= List of people sentenced to more than one life imprisonment =

This is a list of people sentenced to more than one life imprisonment in a single trial, worldwide. The sentence may specify that the life sentences are to be served concurrently or consecutively.

== Prisoners sentenced to more than 20 life sentences ==
Name	Sentence start	Sentence term	Country	Description
Terry Nichols	1995	Life imprisonment without the possibility of parole plus eight 6-year concurrent sentences plus $14,500,000 in restitution plus $450 special assessments (federal)	United States	Convicted of one count of conspiracy to use a weapon of mass destruction resulting in death (in violation of Title 18 United States Code § 2332a) and eight counts of involuntary manslaughter of a federal employee (in violation of Title 18 of the United States Code §§ 1112 and 1114) in federal court (United States District Court for the District of Colorado). Sentenced to determinate life imprisonment for conspiracy to use a weapon of mass destruction and six years concurrently for each count of involuntary manslaughter.
Terry Nichols	n/a	161 consecutive life sentences without the possibility of parole plus 45 years consecutively plus $5,000,000 in restitution plus $1,660,000 in fines (state)	United States	Convicted of 161 counts of murder in the first degree; arson, first degree; and conspiracy by the District Court in and for Pittsburg County, Oklahoma (moved from the District Court in and for Oklahoma County for fairness and safety reasons, but still prosecuted by the District Attorney for that county) for his part in the Oklahoma City bombing of April 19, 1995. Sentenced to 10 years consecutively and a $5,000 fine for conspiracy; 35 years consecutively and a $25,000 fine for arson; and a consecutive sentence of determinate life imprisonment for each count of murder. In addition, he owes $5,000,000 in restitution and a fine $10,000 on each of the 163 counts. This gives Nichols the record for the most consecutive life sentences ever given to a single individual at 162 consecutive life sentences without the possibility of parole when combining his federal and state sentences which are to be served consecutively in that order.
Patrick Crusius	2023	90 consecutive life sentences without parole (federal)	United States	Perpetrator of the 2019 El Paso shooting, in which 23 people were killed and 23 more injured.
Patrick Crusius	2025	23 consecutive life sentences without parole (state)	United States	Perpetrator of the 2019 El Paso shooting, in which 23 people were killed and 23 more injured.
Reynhard Sinaga	2020	88 concurrent life sentences with parole possible in 40 years	United Kingdom	Indonesian-born Manchester resident who was convicted of 136 rapes from 2015 to 2017 of at least 48 drugged victims, a number that according to Greater Manchester Police is most likely much higher. Also the longest officially confirmed sentence ever handed outside the U.S.
Michael J. Devlin	2007	74 life sentences, minimum 2,020 years	United States	Convicted of multiple counts of kidnapping children in 2002 and 2007, armed criminal action, forcible sodomy, child pornography, transporting minors across state lines to engage in sexual activity, attempted murder, and attempted forcible sodomy.
Abdullah Barghouti	2004	67 life sentences plus 5,200 years without parole	Israel	Commander of Hamas' Al-Qassam Brigades and one of its chief bomb makers. Sentenced for the death of 66 Israelis, he is held in solitary confinement and denied visits.
Mongezi Jinxela	2007	55 life sentences plus 1,092 years	South Africa	Serial rapist, convicted of 52 counts of rape, plus 3 counts of being an accomplice to rape.
Anderson Lee Aldrich	2023	55 concurrent life sentences without parole plus 190 years (federal)	United States	Perpetrator of Colorado Springs nightclub shooting in Colorado Springs.
Anderson Lee Aldrich	2023	5 consecutive life sentences without parole plus 2,211 years (state)	United States	Perpetrator of Colorado Springs nightclub shooting in Colorado Springs.
Brenton Tarrant	2020	52 life sentences plus 480 years without parole	New Zealand	Pleaded guilty to the murder of 51 worshippers and seriously injuring 40 others in the Christchurch mosque shootings in 2019. Sentenced to life imprisonment for each murder and preparing for a terrorist act, and an additional 480 years for wounding 40 people.
Boitumelo Galubetse	2013	51 life sentences plus 780 years	South Africa	Serial rapists who operated a taxi and targeted women alone.
Bongani Madlala	2013	49 life sentences plus 780 years	South Africa	Serial rapists who operated a taxi and targeted women alone.
Gary Ridgway	2003	49 life sentences (48 of them without parole) plus 480 years	United States	Serial killer known as the "Green River Killer", who confessed to murdering 71 women between 1982 and 1998. The second most prolific serial killer in U.S. history in terms of number of confirmed victims (behind Samuel Little).
Loi Khac Nguyen	1991	49 consecutive life sentences without parole	United States	Surviving perpetrator of the 1991 Good Guys siege. Convicted of three murders, 11 attempted murders and 35 counts of kidnapping.
Mohammed Abu Warda	2002	48 life sentences	Israel	Hamas militant, helped organize multiple terrorist attacks including the Jaffa Road bus bombings. He was released in 2025 as part of the January 2025 Gaza war ceasefire.
Nkosinathi Phakathi	2024	42 life sentences plus 791 years	South Africa	Convicted of 90 counts of rape, his attacks were carried out between 2012 and 2021.
Abdulkadir Masharipov	2020	40 life sentences plus 1,368 years	Turkey	Abdulkadir Masharipov, an Uzbek national, was handed the equivalent of 40 life sentences plus an additional 1,368 years for perpetrating the 2017 Istanbul nightclub shooting.
James Kevin Pope	2008	40 life sentences plus 60 years	United States	Received 40 convictions of sexual assault for abusing three teenage girls.
Barry Walker	2022	39 life sentences plus 1,710 years without parole	United States	Serial rapist and former physician who practiced medicine in Arkansas. Pleaded guilty and received the maximum sentence for raping at least 31 different minor children ranging from as early as 1997 until as late as 2022.
Mlungisi Mtshali	2013	39 life sentences plus 212 years	South Africa	Serial rapist known as "Birthday rapist", convicted of 70 other charges including: sexual assault, kidnapping and theft.
David Carrick	2023	37 life sentences, minimum 30 years plus 239 days	United Kingdom	Serial rapist and former Metropolitan Police officer who pleaded guilty to multiple counts of rape between 2002 and 2021. Received an additional life term for a second conviction in 2025.
Martin Bryant	1996	35 life sentences plus 1,035 years without parole	Australia	Mass murderer who pleaded guilty to murdering 35 people and injuring 23 others in the Port Arthur massacre, a shooting spree in Port Arthur, Tasmania, Australia on April 28, 1996. Sentenced to the maximum penalty of life imprisonment for each murder, and an additional 1,035 years for wounding 23 people, shooting at 14 other people with the intention to kill, four counts of theft of a motor vehicle, three counts of arson and one of kidnapping.
Billy Joe Godfrey	2015	35 life sentences, minimum 1,050 years	United States	Charged with 35 counts of statutory sodomy in the 1st degree, garnering 35 consecutive life sentences, which is the equivalent of 1,050 years in prison. Godfrey plead guilty to sexually abusing two children between 1995 and 1999. The children were between the ages of eight and 13 at the time of the assaults.
Abbas a-Said	2005	35 life sentences	Israel	Member of the Hamas who was one of the main perpetrators of the Passover massacre.
Nikolas Cruz	2022	34 consecutive life sentences (17 without parole plus a minimum of 380 years)	United States	Perpetrator of the 2018 Parkland high school shooting who plead guilty to killing 17 people and injuring 17 others.
Joseph McCann	2019	33 life sentences	United Kingdom	Serial rapist and pedophile who went on a spree of sexually assaulting 11 victims.
Sinja Mabitsela	2017	32 life sentences plus 275 years	South Africa	One of the balaclava rapists, claims he was forced by his partner Josias Mkansi.
Warren Troy Knoop	2017	32 life sentences plus 170 years	South Africa	Found guilty of 870 charges of child rape, exploitation, sexual assault and child pornography.
Albert Morake	2015	30 life sentences, minimum 1,535 years	South Africa	Serial rapist, convicted of other crimes including: robbery, attempted murder and kidnapping.
Bobby Joe Long	1985	28 life sentences plus 104 years	United States	Serial killer who raped more than 50 women and killed at least 10. The sentence was reduced on appeal from 33 life sentences (26 without parole and 7 with no parole for 25 years). Also sentenced to one death penalty. Executed in 2019.
Donald Harvey	1987	28 life sentences	United States	Hospital orderly who Pleaded guilty to murdering 37 people in Toledo, Ohio between 1970 and 1987, although Harvey has claimed to have killed 87 individuals. Murdered at Toledo Correctional Institution in 2017.
Cedric Maake	2000	27 life sentences plus 1,159 years and 3 months	South Africa	Serial killer known as the Wemmer Pam Murderer and the Hammer Killer. Convicted of 27 murders, 26 attempted murders, 15 rapes and 46 accounts of aggravated robbery, among other charges.
Salvatore Riina	1993	26 life sentences	Italy	Reputed "boss of bosses" of the Sicilian Mafia between 1974 and 1993, nicknamed "The Beast". Served his life sentences in solitary confinement for masterminding the Second Mafia War which caused over 1,000 murders in Sicily until his death in prison in 2017, the day after his 87th birthday.
Andrew Aston	2002	26 life sentences	United Kingdom	Cocaine addict who attacked and robbed 26 elderly and disabled people in their homes over the course of three months. Two victims died.
Shadrack Chauke	2018	25 life sentences plus 254 years	South Africa	Serial rapist, his sentence included 23 counts of rape and 2 counts of attempted murder.
Juan Corona	1973	25 life sentences with a minimum of 7 years to run concurrently	United States	A Mexican-born labor contractor, Corona murdered 25 vagrants and occasional farm workers and buried them in orchards of California between 1970 and 1971. Denied parole 8 times before dying of natural causes in 2019 at California State Prison, Corcoran.
Richard William Huckle	2015	22 life sentences, minimum 25 years	United Kingdom	Sexually abused 23 children in Malaysia over a ten-year period. Murdered at HM Prison Full Sutton in 2019.
Natalie Wagner	2024	21 life sentences plus 800 years	United States	Recorded and sold videos of herself sexually abusing her children, aged 1 and 3, to Snapchat users.
Chester Arthur Stiles	2009	21 life sentences, minimum 140 years	United States	Former Siegfried & Roy trainer who made a video of himself raping and sexually abusing a two-year-old girl in 2003. Sentenced to 21 life sentences on 10 counts of lewdness with a child under the age of 14, 11 counts of sexual assault with a minor under 14, and one count of attempted sexual assault with a minor under 14. 19 charges were tied directly to what was seen in the tape, and three charges pertained to the assault of the 6-year-old girl, who wasn't recorded.
Patrick Wayne Kearney	1977	21 life sentences with a minimum of 7 years to run concurrently	United States	Serial killer who killed 21–43 young men from 1962 to 1977. Sentenced by Superior Judge John Hews to 21 life sentences with a minimum of 7 years to run concurrently. Kearney was denied parole on June 21, 1984; April 29, 1987; July 23, 1990; June 29, 1993; October 30, 1996; January 10, 2002; February 22, 2007; and January 31, 2012. The next time Kearney will be eligible for parole is January 2027.
Hugh Callahan	1975	21 life sentences	United Kingdom	Six Northern Irishmen called the "Birmingham Six" after their arrests and false convictions for the 1974 Birmingham pub bombings. The convictions were quashed by the Court of Appeal and the prisoners released on March 14, 1991.
Gerard Hunter	1975	21 life sentences	United Kingdom	Six Northern Irishmen called the "Birmingham Six" after their arrests and false convictions for the 1974 Birmingham pub bombings. The convictions were quashed by the Court of Appeal and the prisoners released on March 14, 1991.
Patrick Joseph Hill	1975	21 life sentences	United Kingdom	Six Northern Irishmen called the "Birmingham Six" after their arrests and false convictions for the 1974 Birmingham pub bombings. The convictions were quashed by the Court of Appeal and the prisoners released on March 14, 1991.
Richard McIlkenny	1975	21 life sentences	United Kingdom	Six Northern Irishmen called the "Birmingham Six" after their arrests and false convictions for the 1974 Birmingham pub bombings. The convictions were quashed by the Court of Appeal and the prisoners released on March 14, 1991.
William Power	1975	21 life sentences	United Kingdom	Six Northern Irishmen called the "Birmingham Six" after their arrests and false convictions for the 1974 Birmingham pub bombings. The convictions were quashed by the Court of Appeal and the prisoners released on March 14, 1991.
John Walker	1975	21 life sentences	United Kingdom	Six Northern Irishmen called the "Birmingham Six" after their arrests and false convictions for the 1974 Birmingham pub bombings. The convictions were quashed by the Court of Appeal and the prisoners released on March 14, 1991.
Stephan Sterns	2025	21 concurrent life sentences	United States	Convicted of a murder of a 13-year-old girl and 60 counts of child sex crimes against her.

== Prisoners sentenced up to 20 life sentences ==
Name	Sentence start	Sentence term	Country	Description
Bongani Masuku	2019	20 life sentences plus 758 years	South Africa	Gang member accused of 126 crimes including murder, rape and burglary.
Bernardo Provenzano	2006	20 life sentences plus 49 years and 1 month, solitary confinement for 33 years and 6 months	Italy	Member of the Sicilian Mafia, at first Salvatore Riina's right-hand man, then, after Riina's arrest, "boss of bosses". Was 40 years in hiding until his arrest in 2006. Died in 2016 while imprisoned.
Peter Sutcliffe	1981	20 life sentences without parole for 30 years	United Kingdom	Serial killer known as "the Yorkshire Ripper" who murdered 13 people and attempted to murder 7 others between 1975 and 1980. Died in 2020 of COVID-19.
Scott Lehr	1997	18 life sentences without parole for 620 years	United States	Dubbed as the 'Baby Seat Rapist'. Sexual offender and serial killer who murdered 3-5 individuals and has a count of 17 rape convictions. Also received 2 death sentences for 2 of the murders.
Charles Cullen	2006	18 life sentences without parole for 497 years	United States	Nurse who confessed to have killed 40 patients from 1988 to 2003.
Jazzman Rikhotso	2012	17 life sentences plus 164.5 years	South Africa	Serial rapist known as "the Avalon Cemetery Rapist". Rikhotso would prey on females visiting gravesites of loved ones between 2008 and 2010.
Benjamin Geen	2006	17 life sentences without parole for 30 years	United Kingdom	Nurse who injected 17 patients with muscle relaxants between 2003 and 2004. Seven underwent respiratory arrests as a result and two died.
Alexandros Giotopoulos	2003	17 life sentences plus 25 years	Greece	Leader of the Revolutionary Organization 17 November.
David Randitsheni	2009	16 life sentences plus 220 years	South Africa	Serial killer who abducted, raped and murdered children. Hanged himself three weeks after conviction.
Jeffrey Dahmer	1992	16 life sentences without parole	United States	Serial killer known as "the Milwaukee Cannibal" who murdered 17 people between 1978 and 1991. While behind bars, Dahmer was beaten to death by Christopher Scarver in 1994.
Abd al-Hadi Rafa Ghanim	1989	16 life sentences	Israel	Perpetrator of the Tel Aviv–Jerusalem bus 405 suicide attack.
Ahlam Tamimi	2003	16 life sentences	Israel	One of the perpetrators of the Sbarro restaurant suicide bombing. Released in 2011 as part of the Gilad Shalit prisoner exchange and exiled to Jordan. A FBI Most Wanted Terrorist since 2017.
Ricky Wassenaar	2005	16 life sentences	United States	One of two inmates responsible for a 2004 hostage-taking incident in Arizona State Prison Complex – Lewis which is located at Buckeye, Arizona.
Harold Shipman	2000	15 life sentences plus 4 years	United Kingdom	Medical doctor believed to be one of the most prolific serial killers in the world, with more than 218 victims. Died by suicide at HM Prison Wakefield in 2004.
Robert Hanssen	2001	15 consecutive life sentences without parole	United States	FBI agent who spied for the Soviet Union and Russia for 22 years. Died at ADX Florence in 2023.
Lucy Letby	2023	15 life sentences	United Kingdom	Neonatal nurse who was convicted of murdering 7 babies.
Josias Mkansi	2017	14 life sentences plus 185 years	South Africa	One of the balaclava rapists, claims he was innocent and framed by his partner Sinja Mabitsela.
Earl Bradley	2011	14 consecutive life sentences without parole plus 165 years	United States	Convicted of molesting, raping, and sexually exploiting dozens of child patients.
Mzikayise Mkavu	2017	13 life sentences plus 228 years	South Africa	Serial rapist, other crimes include assault, robbery and attempted murder.
Thozamile Taki	2011	13 life sentences plus 208 years	South Africa	Serial killer known as "The Sugarcane Killer" who murdered 13 women.
Leoluca Bagarella	1995	13 life sentences plus 106 years, 10 months, solitary confinement for 6 years	Italy	Member of the Sicilian Mafia, Salvatore Riina's brother-in-law.
Donato Bilancia	1998	13 life sentences plus 30 years in solitary confinement	Italy	Serial killer active in the Italian Riviera.
Michael Wheatley	2002	13 life sentences plus 65 years without parole for 8 years	United Kingdom	Violent robber known as "the Skull-Cracker." Escaped briefly from prison in 2014, but was recaptured.
Beverley Allitt	1993	13 life sentences	United Kingdom	Nurse who fatally poisoned four children and attempted to kill nine others at Grantham and District Hospital in 1991.
Timothy Krajcir	2008	13 life sentences	United States	Serial killer who murdered nine women in Missouri, Illinois and Pennsylvania. Sentence resulting from a plea deal to avoid the death penalty.
Axel Rudakubana	2025	13 life sentences	United Kingdom	Perpetrator of the 2024 Southport stabbings, He was convicted of three counts of murder and ten counts of attempted murder.
Torrens Knight	1993	12 life sentences	United Kingdom	Ulster Defence Association member involved in the Greysteel massacre and the Castlerock killings. Released under the Good Friday Agreement, but his license was suspended after he was convicted of assaulting two women in 2009, and was returned to jail.
Giuseppe Calò	1985	12 life sentences	Italy	Boss of the Sicilian Mafia at Rome as bridge between mafia and political-economical phenomenon. Calò was given 12 life sentences for having ordered a serie of murders and massacres, including Train 904 bombing in December 1984.
James Eagan Holmes	2015	12 consecutive life sentences plus 3,318 years without parole	United States	Mass murderer guilty of perpetrating the 2012 Aurora shooting at a movie theater in Aurora, Colorado. He killed 12 people and wounded 70 others. He was given 12 life sentences (one for each murder), and an additional 3,318 years in prison for numerous counts of attempted murder, one count of possessing an illegal explosive device, and one sentence enhancement of a crime of violence.
Ra Diggs	2015	12 life sentences plus 105 years	United States	Brooklyn-based hip-hop artist who was convicted of charges of racketeering, drug dealing, and three murders.
Bhekithemba Fanozi Nxumalo	2024	12 life sentences plus 75 years	South Africa	Serial rapist active from 2012 until 2021.
Mandisa Ngcobo	2024	12 life sentences plus 55 years	South Africa	Planned attack on a drug business, 15 victims were forced into a small bathroom and set on fire.
Mthobisi Makhathini	2024	12 life sentences plus 55 years	South Africa	Planned attack on a drug business, 15 victims were forced into a small bathroom and set on fire.
Sanele Aubrey Phetha	2024	12 life sentences plus 55 years	South Africa	Planned attack on a drug business, 15 victims were forced into a small bathroom and set on fire.
Joseph James DeAngelo	2020	12 life sentences without parole plus 8 years	United States	The Golden State Killer who was given 11 life terms for murder, 1 life term for kidnapping, and 8 years for a weapons charge.
Valerie Moore	2007	12 life sentences	United States	Perpetrator of the Mizpah Hotel fire.
Joe O'Connell	1977	12 life sentences without parole	United Kingdom	Provisional IRA members captured after the 1975 Balcombe Street siege. All released in 1999 as per the Good Friday Agreement.
Edward Butler	1977	12 life sentences without parole	United Kingdom	Provisional IRA members captured after the 1975 Balcombe Street siege. All released in 1999 as per the Good Friday Agreement.
Harry Duggan	1977	12 life sentences without parole	United Kingdom	Provisional IRA members captured after the 1975 Balcombe Street siege. All released in 1999 as per the Good Friday Agreement.
Hugh Doherty	1977	11 life sentences without parole	United Kingdom	Provisional IRA members captured after the 1975 Balcombe Street siege. All released in 1999 as per the Good Friday Agreement.
Roger Kingsley Dean	2013	11 life sentences plus 12 years without parole	Australia	Perpetrator of the 2011 Quakers Hill Nursing Home fire in Quakers Hill, New South Wales where he worked as a nurse, to cover up his theft of painkillers. 11 patients died and eight others were injured in the blaze.
Charles Juan Proctor	2010	11 life sentences plus 433 years	United States	Serial slasher known as "The Box Cutter". He slashed several women in California. He was convicted of five counts of robbery; three counts each of kidnap for robbery, false imprisonment, and burglary; two counts each of attempted murder and mayhem; and one count each of attempted robbery, attempted kidnap for robbery, assault with a deadly weapon and assault.
Payton Gendron	2023	11 life sentences plus 90 years without parole	United States	Perpetrator of the 2022 Buffalo shooting in which he murdered 10 people.
Soyisiso Nofemele	2012	11 life sentences plus 10 years	South Africa	Child rapist convicted of 12 counts of rape and abduction and 1 count of murder.
Joseph Edward Duncan III	2011	11 life sentences without parole	United States	Convicted of the 1997 murder of Anthony Martinez in California, and the 2005 kidnapping of the Groene family (murdering 4 of them). Duncan's 11 sentences comes from 3 life terms in 2006 from a state court, 6 life terms in 2008 (3 from a state court, and the other 3 from a federal court), and 2 life terms in 2011 from a California court. Died in 2021 while at United States Penitentiary, Terre Haute.
John Justin Bunting	2003	11 life sentences without parole	Australia	Ringleader and main perpetrator of the Snowtown murders.
George Harold Davis	2004	11 life sentences without parole	United States	Opened fire on a group of people outside a bar in downtown Ennis, Montana, then engaged police officers in a high-speed chase and shootout. One man was killed and six others were injured outside the bar. He was given the longest prison sentence in Montana state history.
Juan Manuel Álvarez	2008	11 consecutive life sentences without parole	United States	Drenched his Jeep Cherokee in gasoline before parking it on the tracks on the border of Atwater and Glendale. He bailed out on his suicide attempt but left the Jeep on the tracks. The ensuing derailment sent rail cars into nearby Union Pacific train, killing 11 and injuring 177.
James Ruppert	1975	11 life sentences	United States	Perpetrator of the 1975 "Easter Sunday Massacre", during which he murdered 11 people in his mother's home of Hamilton, Ohio. His sentence was reduced to two life sentences after an appeal in 1982. Ruppert died of natural causes in 2022.
Benjamin Atkins	1992	11 life sentences	United States	Serial Killer known as the Woodward Corridor Killer, who raped and strangled 11 prostitutes in Detroit because of his hate for prostitution. As a child, he was himself raped, and often witnessed his mother while she worked as a prostitute. Died of AIDS-related complications in 1997.
Juan García Abrego	1997	11 life sentences	United States	Drug lord who helped funnel cocaine and marijuana into the United States from Mexico.
Dimitris Koufontinas	2003	11 life sentences	Greece	Main assassin of the Revolutionary Organization 17 November.

== Prisoners sentenced up to 10 life sentences ==
Name	Sentence start	Sentence term	Country	Description
Ahmad Al Aliwi Al-Issa	2024	10 consecutive life sentences without parole plus 1,334 years	United States	Perpetrator of the 2021 Boulder shooting.
Sayfullo Habibullaevic Saipov	2023	10 life sentences plus 260 years without parole	United States	Perpetrator of the 2017 New York truck attack, in which 8 people were killed and 11 more injured.
Dandeny Muñoz Mosquera	1991	10 consecutive life sentences plus 45 years without parole	United States	Chief assassin of the Medellin Cartel, responsible of the bombing of Avianca Flight 203 among others.
Frank Robert James	2023	10 concurrent life sentences plus 10 years without parole	United States	Perpetrator of the 2022 New York City Subway attack in which injured 29 people, including 10 from gunfire. Received life for each person he attempted to murder, and an extra 10 years for a firearms charge.
Dennis Rader	2005	10 life sentences with parole possible after 175 years	United States	Serial killer who is nicknamed the "BTK Killer" murdered at least 10 people between 1974 and 1991 in Kansas.
Robert Joe Wagner	2003	10 life sentences without parole	Australia	One of the perpetrators of the Snowtown murders in which 12 people were killed around the Adelaide, South Australia area in the 1990s.
Robert Bates	1979	10 life sentences	United Kingdom	Member of the Shankill Butchers who tortured and murdered Catholics in Belfast. Some of the victims were not Catholic, but were mistakenly believed to be Catholic.
Xolani Gcelu	2024	9 life sentences plus 158 years	South Africa	Serial rapist, committed several other crimes including kidnapping, robbery and attempted murder.
Jean-Paul Akayesu	1998	9 life sentences, minimum 25 years	United Nations	Found guilty of nine counts of genocide and crimes against humanity by the International Criminal Tribunal for Rwanda. Serves his sentence in a Benin prison since 2020. He was detained in Mali from 2001 until 2020, and before 2001 in ICTR custody in The Hague.
Sean Kelly	1995	9 life sentences	United Kingdom	Member of the Provisional IRA Belfast Brigade who perpetrated the Shankill Road bombing in 1993. The bomb – intended for Johnny Adair and senior members of the Ulster Defence Association – exploded earlier, killing fellow IRA member Thomas Begley and nine unrelated people, and injuring Kelly himself, who lost an eye and the use of his left arm. Released in 2000 under the terms of the Good Friday Agreement.
Dylann Roof	2017	9 consecutive life sentences without parole plus 95 years	United States	Perpetrator of the 2015 Charleston church shooting in which he murdered 9 people. Currently at USP Terre Haute on death row awaiting execution.
Johnathan Doody	2014	9 life sentences	United States	One of two perpetrators of the 1991 Waddell Buddhist temple shooting.
Craig Petties	2013	9 life sentences	United States	Convicted drug trafficker from Memphis, Tennessee.
Robert Bever	2016	9 life sentences, one with parole	United States	One of the perpetrators of the Broken Arrow murders. He was convicted of five counts of first-degree murder and one count of assault and battery with a deadly weapon. He was given life without parole for the murder and one with parole for the assault and battery with a deadly weapon. After trying to attack two staff people, he was given 3 extra life terms.
Thokozani Jiyane	2021	8 life sentences plus 223 years	South Africa	Serial rapist, other crimes include robbery, kidnapping, fraud and assault.
Sibusiso Duma	2009	8 life sentences plus 139 years	South Africa	Taxi driver and serial killer who used his vehicle to procure new victims and sometimes kill them.
Giuseppe Valerio Fioravanti	1981	8 life sentences plus 135 years	Italy	Italian terrorist member of far-right organization Nuclei Armati Rivoluzionari sentenced for Bologna massacre, as well for his multirecord on slander, kidnapping, robbery, battery, home invasion, attempted murder, criminal conspiracy and criminal possession of firearms
Ted Kaczynski	1998	8 consecutive life sentences plus 30 years without parole	United States	Anarchistic terrorist known as the Unabomber, who killed three and injured 23 with parcel bombs. Died in prison at Federal Medical Center, Butner in 2023.
Patrick Magee	1986	8 life sentences without parole for 35 years	United Kingdom	IRA member and perpetrator of the 1984 Brighton hotel bombing, which unsuccessfully tried to kill Margaret Thatcher and her cabinet. Released in 1999 as per the Good Friday Agreement.
George Wagner IV	2022	8 life sentences plus 121 years	United States	One of the perpetrators of the Pike County shootings.
Philip Bruce Cline	1982	8 life sentences plus 15 years	United States	Convicted of murdering 8 people in a fire at the Las Vegas Hilton.
El Shafee Elsheikh	2022	8 concurrent life sentences without parole	United States	Member of 'The Beatles', a terrorist cell of four which was part of Islamic state, as "Ringo". His friend, Alexanda Kotey, who was also part of the group as "George", was also given a life sentence and is incarcerated at ADX Florence. Both were captured in February 2018 while trying to flee the collapse of Islamic State. Other two members of the group, "John" and "Paul" were killed and captured, respectively, in November 2015.
Edmund Kemper	1973	8 life sentences	United States	Serial killer nicknamed "The Co-Ed Butcher."
Alfred Gaynor	2000	8 life sentences	United States	Serial killer from Massachusetts who was convicted of 8 murders, 4 of which in 2000 and the other 4 in 2010.
Michael Lee Cummins	2023	8 life sentences without parole	United States	Perpetrator of the 2019 Sumner County murders in which he murdered multiple members of his own family and his girlfriend's.
Nairi Hunanyan	2003	8 life sentences	Armenia	Perpetrators of the Armenian parliament shooting in 1999, when eight officials were killed, including sitting Prime Minister Vazgen Sargsyan, National Assembly Speaker Karen Demirchyan, and Minister of Urgent Affairs Leonard Petrosyan.
Karen Hunanyan	2003	8 life sentences	Armenia	Perpetrators of the Armenian parliament shooting in 1999, when eight officials were killed, including sitting Prime Minister Vazgen Sargsyan, National Assembly Speaker Karen Demirchyan, and Minister of Urgent Affairs Leonard Petrosyan.
Vram Galstyan	2003	8 life sentences	Armenia	Perpetrators of the Armenian parliament shooting in 1999, when eight officials were killed, including sitting Prime Minister Vazgen Sargsyan, National Assembly Speaker Karen Demirchyan, and Minister of Urgent Affairs Leonard Petrosyan.
Derenik Ejanyan	2003	8 life sentences	Armenia	Perpetrators of the Armenian parliament shooting in 1999, when eight officials were killed, including sitting Prime Minister Vazgen Sargsyan, National Assembly Speaker Karen Demirchyan, and Minister of Urgent Affairs Leonard Petrosyan.
Eduard Grigoryan	2003	8 life sentences	Armenia	Perpetrators of the Armenian parliament shooting in 1999, when eight officials were killed, including sitting Prime Minister Vazgen Sargsyan, National Assembly Speaker Karen Demirchyan, and Minister of Urgent Affairs Leonard Petrosyan.
Michele Greco	1991	8 life sentences	Italy	Boss of the Sicilian Mafia at Palermo, sentenced for the simple fact of lending itself to puppet for Corleonesi.
Scott Evans Dekraai	2011	8 life sentences	United States	Perpetrator of 2011 Seal Beach shooting.
Kendall Francois	2000	8 life sentences	United States	Murdered at least 8 women in upper New York between 1996 and 1998. Francois died in 2014 while at Wende Correctional Facility.
Ronald Dominique	2008	8 life sentences without parole	United States	Serial killer who raped and murdered over 23 men in Louisiana between 1997 and 2008.
Robert Eugene Crimo III	2025	7 consecutive life sentences plus 2,400 years without parole	United States	Perpetrator of the 2022 Highland Park parade shooting.
One L. Goh	2017	7 consecutive life sentences plus 271 years without parole	United States	Perpetrator of the 2012 Oikos University shooting. Died in prison in 2019.
Jeffrey Kollie	1996	7 life sentences plus 265 years	United States	Convicted of armed robbery. The sentence was the longest in the US state of Georgia. They rejected an offer to plead guilty for a 40-year prison sentence.
Ryan Brandt	1996	7 life sentences plus 265 years	United States	Convicted of armed robbery. The sentence was the longest in the US state of Georgia. They rejected an offer to plead guilty for a 40-year prison sentence.
Jared Lee Loughner	2012	7 life sentences plus 140 years without parole	United States	Perpetrator of the 2011 Tucson shooting.
Marshall Lee Gore	1989	7 life sentences plus 110 years	United States	Attacked 4 women in Florida in 1988 murdering 2 of them. Sentenced to death for each of the murders he committed. Executed via lethal injection on October 1, 2013.
Robert Cannon	2006	7 life sentences plus 85 years	United States	Perpetrators of the Deltona massacre. Hunter and Victorino were also sentenced to death for each of the 6 murders in the massacre; these sentences were overturned in 2017 but reinstated in 2025.
Jerone Hunter	2006	7 life sentences plus 35 years	United States	Perpetrators of the Deltona massacre. Hunter and Victorino were also sentenced to death for each of the 6 murders in the massacre; these sentences were overturned in 2017 but reinstated in 2025.
Michael Salas	2006	7 life sentences plus 20 years	United States	Perpetrators of the Deltona massacre. Hunter and Victorino were also sentenced to death for each of the 6 murders in the massacre; these sentences were overturned in 2017 but reinstated in 2025.
Troy Victorino	2006	7 life sentences plus 20 years	United States	Perpetrators of the Deltona massacre. Hunter and Victorino were also sentenced to death for each of the 6 murders in the massacre; these sentences were overturned in 2017 but reinstated in 2025.
Ivan Milat	1996	7 life sentences plus 18 years without parole	Australia	Perpetrator of the Backpacker murders. Died in 2019 of cancer.
Matteo Messina Denaro	2023	7 life sentences	Italy	Boss of bosses of the Sicilian Mafia between 2007 and 2023. Was a fugitive from 1993 until his arrest in January 2023. Later died in prison eight months later of cancer.
Paul Michael Merhige	2011	7 life sentences	United States	Perpetrator of the 2009 Thanksgiving murders.
Michael Morgan McDermott	2002	7 life sentences without parole	United States	Perpetrator of the 2000 Edgewater Technology shooting.
Walter E. Ellis	2011	7 life sentences without parole	United States	Serial killer known as the "Milwaukee North Side Strangler." Died in prison in 2013.
Samuel Sidyno	2000	7 life sentences without parole for 40 years	South Africa	Serial killer who raped and murdered two women and five boys near Pretoria Zoo between 1998 and 1999.
Antoni Imiela	2004	7 life sentences without parole for 8 years	United Kingdom	Serial rapist active over a large area of southern England. Died at HM Prison Wakefield in 2018.
William Edward Wells	2004	7 consecutive life sentences without parole	United States	Serial killer and mass murderer who killed seven people in Florida from 2003 to 2019. Wells was sentenced to one death sentence for the seventh and final murder, while receiving life imprisonment for the other victims.
Todd Kohlhepp	2017	7 consecutive life sentences without parole	United States	Murdered 7 people in South Carolina between 2003 and 2016, 4 of which was at a bike shop.
Reta Mays	2021	7 consecutive life sentences without parole	United States	Murdered 7 elderly veterans at Louis A. Johnson VA Medical Center in West Virginia by injecting patients with lethal doses of insulin.
Efren Saldivar	2001	7 consecutive life sentences without parole	United States	Serial killer who was sentenced for murdering patients while working as a respiratory therapist.
Ahlam Albashir	2024	7 life sentences	Turkey	Perpetrator of the 2022 Istanbul bombing.
Stewart Wilken	1998	7 life sentences	South Africa	Serial killer and necrophiliac known as the "Boetie Boer". Murdered and sodomized ten women and young boys, including his ex-wife's son. Also killed his daughter.
Nikos Metaxas	2018	7 life sentences	Cyprus	Greek Cypriot former army officer who confessed to the Mitsero murders.
Ami Popper	1991	7 life sentences	Israel	Dishonorably discharged IDF soldier who murdered seven Palestinian workers at a bus stop in Rishon Lezion in 1990. His sentence was later reduced to 40 years and he was granted temporary leaves.
John Childs	1978	7 life sentences	United Kingdom	Serial killer sentenced for 6 murders whose bodies haven't still found.
Darrell E. Brooks	2022	6 consecutive life sentences plus 1,067 years without the possibility of parole	United States	Perpetrator of the 2021 Waukesha Christmas parade attack in which he plowed his SUV into the event, murdering 6 and injuring a further 62.
Rayshun Mullins	2009	6 life sentences plus 1,015 years	United States	Serial rapist who attacked 9 women between 2003 and 2004. Convicted on 26 counts, which included rape, kidnapping, robbery and burglary.
Larry Hoover	1973	6 life sentences plus 200 years	United States	Co-founder of the street gang, the Gangster Disciples and life sentenced for murder, extortion, drug trafficking and money laundering.
Linda Hayes	2015	6 life sentences plus 106 years	United States	One of two perpetrators of the Cheshire murders. First given six death sentences and 106 years at a 2010 trial, six of which were changed to life sentences after Connecticut abolished the death penalty.
Chai Vang	2004	6 consecutive life sentences plus 70 years without parole	United States	California National Guard veteran who killed six hunters and wounded another two during a hunting trip to northern Wisconsin. Died on June 10, 2026.
Peter Odighizuwa	2004	6 life sentences without parole plus 28 years	United States	Perpetrator of the 2002 Appalachian School of Law shooting in which he murdered 3 people.
Malcolm George Baker	1992	6 life sentences plus 25 years without parole	Australia	Perpetrator of the 1992 Central Coast massacre in which Baker went on a spree killing at Central Coast (New South Wales), murdering 6 people.
Abdelkrim Belachheb	1984	6 life sentences plus 20 years	United States	Perpetrator of the 1984 Dallas nightclub shooting.
Jason Brian Dalton	2019	6 life sentences without parole	United States	Perpetrator of the 2016 Kalamazoo shootings in which he murdered 6 people.
John Wayne Glover	1990	6 life sentences without parole	Australia	Serial killer of elderly women in Sydney. Hanged himself in prison in 2005.
Lee Boyd Malvo	2006	6 life sentences without parole	United States	Accomplice of John Allen Muhammad in the Beltway Sniper killings. Muhammad was sentenced to death and executed in 2009.
Zacarias Moussaoui	2001	6 consecutive life sentences without parole	United States	French Moroccan who pleaded guilty to conspiring to take part in the 9/11 terrorist attacks.
Terry Blair	2008	6 consecutive life sentences without parole	United States	Serial killer and rapist active in Kansas City, Missouri. Died in May 2024.
Salvatore Lo Piccolo	2007	6 life sentences without parole plus 95 years	Italy	Boss of the Sicilian Mafia at Palermo in Tommaso Natale neighborhood, at first boss Antonio Rotolo's rival, then, after Rotolo's arrest, "boss of bosses". Was 24 years in hiding until his arrest in 2007. He was life sentenced for commanding murders precisely during his short-clash with Rotolo.
James William Miller	1979	6 life sentences without parole for 35 years	Australia	Accomplice of Christopher Worrell in the Truro murders. Worrell died in a car accident before capture, and Miller died in prison of cancer in 2008 after being jailed since 1979.
Ronald DeFeo Jr.	1975	6 life sentences without parole for 25 years	United States	Perpetrator of the Amityville family massacre. Defeo died in 2021.
Elmer Wayne Henley	1974	6 life sentences	United States	Teenage accomplice of serial killer Dean Corll in the Houston Mass Murders, whom he also killed in self-defence.
David Berkowitz	1978	6 life sentences	United States	Serial killer of couples known as "Son of Sam" and "the .44 Caliber Killer."
Michele Anderson	2016	6 life sentences	United States	Perpetrator of the 2007 Carnation murders in which she and her boyfriend murdered multiple members of her family.
Bruce Johnston	1981	6 consecutive life sentences	United States	Philadelphia gang leader convicted of six murders and one attempt. Johnston died in 2002 while at State Correctional Institution – Graterford.
Daniel Gonzalez	2004	6 life sentences	United Kingdom	Mentally ill spree killer. Died by suicide in prison.
Paul Steven Haigh	1991	6 life sentences	Australia	Responsible for the murder of 7 people.
Damian Karlik	2011	6 life sentences	Israel	Russian-Israeli murderer charged for the murder of his former employer and his whole family.

== Prisoners sentenced up to 5 life sentences ==
Name	Sentence start	Sentence term	Country	Description
Jarrod Warren Ramos	2021	5 consecutive life sentences without parole plus 345 years	United States	Perpetrator of the 2018 Capital Gazette shooting.
Happy Mukwevho	2023	5 life sentences plus 222 years	South Africa	Serial rapist, committed several other crimes including kidnapping and robbery.
Jorge Avila-Torrez	2010	5 consecutive life sentences plus 168 years	United States	Former US Marine convicted of raping five people in Virginia. Later convicted and sentenced to a further 100 years for the 2005 kidnapping, rape, and murder of two young girls in Illinois.
Esteban Santiago-Ruiz	2018	5 life sentences without parole plus 120 years	United States	Perpetrator of the 2017 Fort Lauderdale airport shooting in which he murdered 5 people and injured 6 others.
Guillermo Zarabozo	2009	5 life sentences plus 85 years	United States	Accomplice of Kirby Logan Archer.
Donald Neilson	1976	5 life sentences plus 61 years	United Kingdom	Robber, kidnapper and murderer nicknamed "the Black Panther" for the balaclava that he wore during his attacks. Died in prison in 2011.
Demetrius Terrence Frazier	1993	5 life sentences plus 60 to 90 years	United States	Convicted of killing a girl and a woman in Michigan and Alabama respectively. Sentenced to four life terms in Michigan and received both a death sentence and a fifth life sentence in Alabama. Frazier was executed in the Alabama gas chamber on February 6, 2025.
Samir Kuntar	1979	5 life sentences plus 47 years	Israel	Lebanese members of a PLF commando who attempted to abduct an Israeli citizen, Danny Haran, in the 1979 Nahariya attack. Kuntar and al-Abras were captured after sustaining a shootout with Israeli police and soldiers, and subsequently convicted of the murders of two Israeli policemen, Haran and his two daughters, Einat and Yael Haran, who were 4 and 2 years old, respectively. Yael Haran was accidentally suffocated by her mother while hiding in a crawlspace, and Einat Haran died in the shootout with her father. Kuntar and al-Abras always denied having killed Haran and his daughter and claimed that it was the Israeli forces who had actually killed them when they fired on the abductors as they tried to leave. Al-Abras was released in the 1985 Jibril agreement, and Kuntar in the 2008 Israel-Hezbollah prisoner swap. Kuntar was killed in 2015 by an Israeli drone strike in Syria.
Ahmad al-Abras	1979	5 life sentences plus 47 years	Israel	
Marwan Barghouti	2004	5 life sentences plus 40 years	Israel	Leader of the Second Intifada and alleged founder of Tanzim.
Michael Bever	2018	5 life sentences plus 28 years	United States	Michael Bever was involved in his brother's crimes.
Christopher Bryan Speight	2013	5 life sentences plus 18 years.	United States	Perpetrator of the 2010 Appomattox shootings.
Leonard Fraser	1999	5 life sentences plus 25 years without parole	Australia	Serial killer known as "the Rockhampton Rapist." Died in prison in 2007.
Robert Mark Steele	1993	5 life sentences plus 25 years without parole	Australia	Spree killer captured after the 1993 Cangai siege. Hanged himself in prison in 1994.
Christopher Watts	2018	5 life sentences without parole plus 84 years	United States	Killed his wife and children, including his unborn son in August 2018. Pleaded guilty on November 6, 2018, and was sentenced to five life sentences without the possibility of parole. In addition to the life terms, Watts was sentenced to 48 years for unlawful termination of a pregnancy and 36 years in prison for three counts of tampering with a deceased human body.
Chester William Fewins	2020	5 life sentences plus 59 years	United States	Convicted on 3 counts of 1st degree child molestation, attempted 1st degree statutory rape, abuse or neglect of a child under 14, 1st degree statutory rape person under 14, 1st degree statutory sodomy person under 14, tampering with a victim or attempt to tamper with a victim.
John List	1990	5 life sentences without parole	United States	Killed his wife, mother and children in 1971 and became one of the most notorious fugitives in the US until his arrest in Virginia in 1989, after he was featured in America's Most Wanted. Died in prison in 2008.
Lindsay Robert Rose	1998	5 life sentences without parole	Australia	Serial killer and contract killer who murdered 5 people between 1984 and 1994.
Faye Copeland	1999	5 life sentences without parole	United States	Originally sentenced to death along with her husband Ray for the murder of five itinerant workers in their farm, between 1986 and 1989. With ages of 76 and 69 at the time of sentencing, the couple were the oldest prisoners in death row in the United States. After Ray died from natural causes while in death row in 1993, there was growing pressure to pardon Faye or reduce her sentence, as some argued that she had been abused and pressured into helping with the murders by her husband. The death sentence was commuted in 1999, and in 2002 Missouri Governor Bob Holden authorized her release on medical grounds. She died in a nursing home in 2003 from natural causes.
Douglas Crabbe	1983	5 life sentences without parole for 30 years	Australia	Truck driver who deliberately drove his vehicle into a crowded bar in Uluru, killing five.
Lori Vallow Daybell	2023	5 life sentences without parole for 25 years	United States	Black widow who murdered two of her children, and conspired to murder her fourth husband, her lover's first wife, and her nephew-in-law.
Charles Durdle	2023	5 life sentences without parole for 10 years and 2 months	United Kingdom	Sentenced for the captivity, torture, and repeated rape of a woman while he was in breach of an existing Sexual Harm Prevention Order, as well as sending photographs of the rapes to a teenager.
William MacDonald	1963	5 life sentences	Australia	Serial killer known as "the Sydney Mutilator." Died in prison in 2015.
Colin Ireland	1993	5 life sentences	United Kingdom	Serial killer of homosexual men nicknamed "the Gay Slayer." Died in prison in 2012.
Benedetto Santapaola	1993	5 life sentences	Italy	Boss of the Sicilian Mafia at Catania, arrested in 1993 after 11 years hiding and given 5 life sentences for having ordered a serie of murders and massacres, including Circonvallazione massacre which rival boss Alfio Ferlito and 4 policemen were slain in June 1982. Died in March 2026.
John Stanfa	1994	5 life sentences	United States	Boss of the Philadelphia crime family between 1991-1994. Life sentenced for murders during the war with the boss Joey Merlino, as well for kidnapping, extortion and illegal gambling.
Binh Thai Luc	2018	5 life sentences	United States	Perpetrator of the Lei family murders.
Kirby Logan Archer	2008	5 consecutive life sentences	United States	Pleaded guilty to hijacking a fishing vessel and murdering its crew. Was found adrift in said vessel in 2007.
Gwendolyn Graham	1989	5 life sentences	United States	Serial killer who murdered five elderly women in a retirement home of Grand Rapids, Michigan, where she worked as an unlicensed nurse's aide. Her accomplice Cathy Wood, also a worker with the same rank, was sentenced to 40 years in prison.
Lian Bin "Robert" Xie	2017	5 life sentences	Australia	Perpetrator of the 2009 Lin family murders.
Steven Dale Green	2009	5 life sentences	United States	One of the perpetrators of the 2006 Mahmudiyah rape and killings which occurred in Iraq during the Iraq War. Died by suicide in 2014 at United States Penitentiary, Tucson.
Nathaniel Veltman	2024	5 life sentences with parole possible after 25 years	Canada	Perpetrator of the 2021 London, Ontario, truck attack in which he plowed his vehicle into a family of five waiting to cross the road at an intersection, murdering four of them.
Joseph Eaton	2024	4 life sentences plus 290 years	United States	Perpetrator of the 2023 Bowdoin–Yarmouth shootings.
Herman See	2020	4 life sentences plus 221 years	United States	Father convicted on 22 counts of rape against his own daughters. Sentenced along with his wife, Angela Stites (who received 86 years).
Travis Eugene Posey	2025	4 consecutive life sentences plus 220 years without parole	United States	Perpetrator of the 2024 Fordyce shooting.
Dametrius Marquel Sims	2024	4 consecutive life sentences plus 90 years	United States	Lead a group that was involved in at least six robberies targeting restaurants and delivery drivers in Gwinnett County between August and October 2017.
Stanislav Beloruscev	2010–2017	4 life sentences plus 51 years imprisonment	Russia	Serial killer who murdered elderly people and acquaintances in his hometown of Krasnokamsk. Notable for confessing to new crimes over a period of several years.
Raffaele Cutolo	1979	4 life sentences plus 50 years in solitary confinement	Italy	Boss and founder of the NCO, a Camorra suborganization. From 1979, Cutolo was serving life imprisonment under 41-bis regime for masterminding murders inside several prisons and was one of the longest prisoners on Camorra bosses and finally died in 2021 imprisoned.
Renato Vallanzasca	1987	4 life sentences without parole plus 295 years	Italy	Leader of the criminal organization Banda della Comasina who was life sentenced for his multirecord on prison escapes, weapons trafficking, murders, kidnappings and robberies. Vallanzasca is 4th longest prisoner in Italy after Domenico Papalia, Pippo Calò and Raffaele Cutolo.
Pasquale Condello	2008	4 life sentences plus 22 years	Italy	Boss of the Ndrangheta who's serving life imprisonment for heading the Second Ndrangheta War, which left +700 killed in Calabria between 1985 and 1991. Condello was caught in 2008 after 17 years hiding.
Robert Aaron Long	2021	4 consecutive life sentences plus 35 years without parole	United States	Perpetrator of 2021 Atlanta spa shootings, in which 8 people were killed and one more was injured. However, this sentence is for conviction for shooting in Cherokee county, where 4 out of 8 victims were killed.
Nicolai Bonner	2005	4 life sentences plus 34 years	Israel	Homeless serial killer, born in Moldova, who killed four other homeless people, all also originally from the former Soviet Union and who had been drinking partners of Bonner.
Samuel Leonard Boyd	1985	4 life sentences plus 25 years without parole	Australia	Stabbed a woman in 1982, and on April 22, 1983, bashed his flatmate to death with a hammer before driving to a school, taking three teachers hostage and forcing them to abuse each other before killing two of them. Sentenced to five consecutive life sentences without parole, redetermined in 1995 under new laws.
Kristen Gilbert	2001	4 life sentences without parole plus 20 years	United States	Serial killer nurse who injected patients at the Northampton Veterans Affairs Medical Center with epinephrine, inducing heart attacks.
Michael Lupo	1987	4 life sentences plus 14 years	United Kingdom	Serial killer known as "The Wolf Man", who murdered homosexual men in London. Died from AIDS-related complications in 1995.
Nicholas Tartaglione	2024	4 consecutive life sentences without parole	United States	Convicted of 2016 quadruple murder connected to botched drug deal.
Cosmo DiNardo	2018	4 life sentences	United States	One of two perpetrators of the July 2017 Pennsylvania murders.
Daniel Blank	2000	4 life sentences without parole	United States	Dubbed the River Parishes serial killer, Blank had killed a total of six people in Louisiana between 1996 and 1997. He was sentenced to death in 1999 for one of the murders while he received another four life terms without parole between 2000 and 2009 for four of the remaining cases.
Jeremy Strohmeyer	1998	4 life sentences without parole	United States	Molested and killed an unsupervised seven-year-old girl in a Nevada casino's restroom when he was eighteen. Took a plea deal to avoid the death penalty.
Mark Hobson	2005	4 life sentences without parole	United Kingdom	Spree killer who murdered his girlfriend, her twin sister and an elderly couple during an eight-day manhunt. Documents found at his home revealed that the first two killings were premeditated and that he intended to murder more of his girlfriend's relatives.
Samuel Little	2014	4 life sentences without parole	United States	Serial killer who murdered at least 60 people and confessed to murdering 93 people. This convictions is for four of the killings, and Little was not prosecuted for the rest of them. Died in prison in 2020.
Howell Emanuel Donaldson III	2023	4 consecutive life sentences without parole	United States	Serial killer who in 2017 shot dead 4 people in Seminole Heights neighbourhood of Tampa, Florida.
Seth Jameson Frazier	2025	4 consecutive life sentences without parole	United States	One of the four prisoners who conducted a prison escape that led to the murders of four prison employees at a North Carolina prison in 2017.
Bandali Debs	2011	4 life sentences plus 27 years without parole	Australia	Serial armed robber, perpetrator of the Silk–Miller police murders; also killed two sex workers.
James Spyridon Vlassakis	2003	4 life sentences without parole for 26 years	Australia	Perpetrator of the Snowtown murders.
David Birnie	1996	4 life sentences without parole for 20 years	Australia	Perpetrators of the Moorhouse murders. David Birnie hanged himself in prison in 2005, the day before his trial for the rape of another inmate. Catherine Birnie was declared "never to be released" in 2009, and this decision was maintained after amendments to the parole law in 2018 increased the deferral period to six years.
Catherine Birnie	1996	4 life sentences without parole for 20 years	Australia	Perpetrators of the Moorhouse murders. David Birnie hanged himself in prison in 2005, the day before his trial for the rape of another inmate. Catherine Birnie was declared "never to be released" in 2009, and this decision was maintained after amendments to the parole law in 2018 increased the deferral period to six years.
Eric Rudolph	2005	4 life sentences (two of them without parole)	United States	Perpetrator of the 1996 Centennial Olympic Park bombing.
Denis Goldberg	1964	4 life sentences	South Africa	Technical advisor to uMkhonto we Sizwe, convicted at the Rivonia Trial. Released in 1985.
David Johnston	1981	4 life sentences	United States	Brothers of Bruce Johnston and members of his gang.
Norman Johnston	1981	4 life sentences	United States	Brothers of Bruce Johnston and members of his gang.
Barry Mills	2006	4 life sentences	United States	Leader of the Aryan Brotherhood. Died at ADX Florence in 2018.
Waldo Grant	1978	4 life sentences	United States	Serial killer active in New York.
Wayne Boden	1971	4 life sentences	Canada	Serial killer and rapist known as "The Vampire Rapist and Strangler Bill".
Nicholas Browning	2009	4 life sentences	United States	Teenager who murdered his family.
Brandon Tholmer	1986	4 life sentences	United States	Murdered 12–34 people between 1981 and 1983.
Mario Normore	2023	4 life sentences	United States	Murdered 4 people in 2017.
Daron Wint	2019	4 life sentences	United States	Perpetrator of the D.C. mansion murders.
Umar Farouk Abdulmutallab	2012	4 life sentences plus 50 years	United States	The Underwear Bomber, threatened to blow up an airliner by having Semtex sown into his underwear.
Bryan Christopher Kohberger	2025	4 consecutive life sentences plus 10 years without parole	United States	Perpetrator of 2022 University of Idaho murders where he killed four students after he broke into their dorms and slit their throats.
Alex Ewing	2021–2022	4 consecutive life sentences	United States	Serial killer responsible for a 1984 crime spree in the Denver, Colorado area. Sentenced to three life sentences in August 2021 for the triple hammer murder of an Aurora family, and sentenced to one additional life sentence in April 2022 for the hammer murder of Patricia Smith in Lakewood.

== Prisoners sentenced up to 3 life sentences ==
Name	Sentence start	Sentence term	Country	Description
Dudley Wayne Kyzer	1981	3 life sentences plus 10,000 years	United States	Convicted of killing his estranged wife, Diane Kyzer, his mother-in-law, Eunice Barringer, and college student Rick Pyron who just happened to be at the Barringer home on Halloween in 1976. Denied parole 10 times, the most recent being in 2016.
Heather Pressdee	2024	3 life sentences plus 380–760 years	United States	Pennsylvania nurse who murdered 3 people through lethal doses of insulin.
Richard Reid	2003	3 consecutive life sentences plus 110 years without parole	United States	British-born terrorist who tried to detonate a bomb with shoes on American Airlines Flight 63 in 2001.
Lemuel Smith	1977	3 life sentences plus 95 years	United States	Serial killer who murdered Donna Payant, female corrections officer while was serving life imprisonment for previous 5 murders.
Shaun Gallon	2019	3 life sentences plus 94 years	United States	Perpetrator of the 2004 Jenner, California, double murder.
Victor Orena	1992	3 life sentences plus 85 years	United States	Acting boss of the Colombo crime family that declared war to his boss Carmine Persico. Currently, Orena is still serving his 3 life sentences at Federal Medical Center, Devens
Marcel Wayne Williams	1994	3 life sentences plus 70 years	United States	Sentenced to death for the murder of Stacy Rae Errickson and also three terms of life imprisonment plus 70 years for kidnapping, robbing and raping Errickson in the same case. Executed on April 24, 2017.
Sylvia Seegrist	1986	3 life sentences plus 70 years	United States	Paranoid schizophrenic who opened fire in a shopping mall outside Philadelphia, killing three and injuring seven before being disarmed by another shopper.
Rockne Warren Newell	2015	3 life sentences plus 61–122 years	United States	Perpetrator of the 2013 Ross Township Municipal Building shooting.
Ronnie O'Neal	2021	3 life sentences plus 90 years	United States	Perpetrator of the 2018 Riverview murders.
Michael Kanaan	1999	3 life sentences plus 75 years without parole	Australia	Serial killer who murdered 3 people in Sydney in 1998.
John Cribb	1978	3 life sentences plus 45 years	Australia	While under parole for a previous sentence for armed robbery, Cribb broke into a family home of Swansea, New South Wales, and abducted a woman and her two children. Cribb phoned the woman's husband to tell him that he was the woman's long-time lover and that they had run away together. Afterward, Cribb raped the woman and fatally stabbed all captives with a knife, before being arrested after a ten-hour siege. While in awaiting trial, he escaped with another inmate and went on a robbery and raping spree until they were re-captured. Cribb's sentence was increased by thirty years because of crimes committed during this escape.
Arthur Walker	1985	3 life sentences plus 40 years	United States	Brother of US Navy officer John Anthony Walker, convicted of spying for the Soviet Union along with him. Both died in prison in 2014.
Will Hayden	2017	3 life sentences plus 40 years	United States	Two counts of aggravated rape and one count of forcible rape, of two girls over the course of two decades, one of which was his daughter.
Wasim a-Sayed	2025	3 life sentences plus 40 years	Israel	Palestinian serial killer linked to ISIS who murdered three people and attempted to murder two others between 2019 and 2022.
Itzhak Abergil	2022	3 life sentences plus 30 years	Israel	Israeli mafia boss, head of the Abergil crime family, convicted for 3 charges of murder, attempted murder, criminal conspiracy and racketeering.
Natasha Wallen Cornett	1998	3 life sentences plus 25 years without parole	United States	Perpetrators of the Lillelid murders.
Edward Dean Mullins	1998	3 life sentences plus 25 years without parole	United States	Perpetrators of the Lillelid murders.
Joseph Lance Risner	1998	3 life sentences plus 25 years without parole	United States	Perpetrators of the Lillelid murders.
Crystal R. Sturgill	1998	3 life sentences plus 25 years without parole	United States	Perpetrators of the Lillelid murders.
Jason Blake Bryant	1998	3 life sentences plus 25 years without parole	United States	Perpetrators of the Lillelid murders.
Karen R. Howell	1998	3 life sentences plus 25 years without parole	United States	Perpetrators of the Lillelid murders.
Hugo Pastén Espinoza	2022	3 life sentences (with the possibility of parole in 120 years) plus 20 years	Chile	Serial killer responsible for three murders occurred in 2019.
Ashley Coulston	1992	3 life sentences plus 7 years without parole	Australia	Triple murderer and abductor. Also a suspect in the Balaclava Killings of 1979–1980.
Francesco Schiavone	1998	3 life sentences plus 7 years without parole	Italy	Casalesi clan leader who succeeded his murdered boss Antonio Bardellino. Sandokan received several life sentences for Bardellino's murder at Spartacus Trial and for other crimes.
Patrick Nogueira	2018	3 life sentences plus 25 years	Spain	Brazilian 19-year-old who murdered his aunt, uncle and two infant cousins in Pioz, Castilla–La Mancha. The three life sentences were for the murders of the children due to their age, and the premeditation of the uncle's murder hours after the others.
Willie James Pye	1996	3 life sentences plus 20 years	United States	Convicted of kidnapping, burglary, robbery and rape for the death of his ex-girlfriend Alicia Lynn Yarbrough in Georgia. Additionally, Pye received the death sentence in Georgia for the most serious charge of murdering Yarbrough, and he was executed by lethal injection in 2024.
Martin Leach	1984	3 life sentences without parole	Australia	Stabbed two teenage girls in Berry Springs, Northern Territory in a sexually motivated attack.
Dana Ewell	1992	3 life sentences without parole	United States	Arranged the killings of his father, mother and sister with the intention to inherit the family fortune.
Michael Swango	2000	3 life sentences without parole	United States	Physician who admitted to causing four deaths and suspected of sixty poisonings of patients.
Richard Timmons	2004	3 life sentences without parole	United States	Fatally stabbed his stepson and decapitated his wife and son with an ax in Queens, New York.
Ramzi Aouad	2006	3 life sentences without parole	Australia	Convicted in the Darwiche-Razzak-Fahda Family Conflict trial.
Naseam El-Zeyat	2006	3 life sentences without parole	Australia	Convicted in the Darwiche-Razzak-Fahda Family Conflict trial.
Michael Woodbury	2007	3 life sentences without parole	United States	Convicted of murdering three people in a New Hampshire store shooting. Later sentenced to death in 2018 for the murder of a fellow inmate in Florida.
Alec Devon Kreider	2008	3 life sentences without parole	United States	16-year-old student who murdered a classmate and his classmate's parents in their family home. Died by suicide in prison in 2017 at State Correctional Institution – Camp Hill.
Scott Williams	2008	3 life sentences without parole	United States	Serial killer active in North Carolina.
Craig Stephen Hicks	2019	3 life sentences without parole	United States	Perpetrator of the 2015 Chapel Hill shooting.
Peter Dupas	2010	3 life sentences without parole	Australia	Convicted of murder and primarily for being a serious habitual offender.
Aaron Schaffhausen	2013	3 life sentences without parole	United States	Killed his three daughters to spite his ex-wife.
Anthony Wayne Smith	2016	3 life sentences without parole	United States	Former National Football League player and serial killer convicted of three murders between 1999 and 2001; acquitted of a fourth murder in 2008.
Alexis Ramírez Gutiérrez	2026	3 life sentences (with the possibility of parole in 60 years)	Chile	Killed three people in two different brawls.
David Brom	1989	3 life sentences without parole for 56 years	United States	Killed his parents, brother and sister with an axe near Rochester, Minnesota.
T.J. Lane	2013	3 consecutive life sentences plus 37 years	United States	Perpetrator of the 2012 Chardon High School shooting.
Adam Purinton	2018	3 consecutive life sentences	United States	Perpetrator of the 2017 Olathe shooting.
Johnny Johnson	2005	3 consecutive life sentences	United States	Sentenced to death for the murder of Casey Williamson, in addition to three consecutive life sentences for armed criminal action, kidnapping, and attempted forcible rape. Executed in 2023.
Norman Newsted	1985	3 consecutive life sentences	United States	Sentenced to death for the murder of Lawrence Buckley in Oklahoma, plus three consecutive life sentences for a triple murder in Cedar City, Utah. Executed in Oklahoma in 1999.
Michael Ray Soles	1976	3 consecutive life sentences	United States	Sentenced to three consecutive life sentences for the deaths of three victims in the 1976 Wichita Holiday Inn shooting.
Pierre Williams	2008	3 life sentences without parole for 38 years	United Kingdom	Beat his ex-girlfriend and his ex-girlfriend's two children to death with a ball-peen hammer in the victims' own home. After the crimes, he made a paste with their blood and coconut oil, apparently inspired by Biblical sacrifices.
David Bieber	2004	3 life sentences without parole for 37 years	United Kingdom	American fugitive who murdered a police constable and attempted to murder two others in Leeds.
Paul Denyer	1993	3 life sentences without parole for 30 years	Australia	Serial killer known as "the Frankston Killer."
Gregory Brazel	2005	3 life sentences without parole for 30 years	Australia	Confessed to the murders of two prostitutes in 1990 and of a store employee during a robbery in 1982.
Phillip Austin	2001	3 life sentences without parole for 20 years	United Kingdom	Killed his wife and two children.
Ian Brady	1966	3 life sentences	United Kingdom	Serial killer, perpetrator of the Moors Murders along with his girlfriend, Myra Hindley. Died in prison in 2017.
Frederick Pete Cox	2003	3 life sentences	United States	Murdered 3 women and attacked 2 others in 1997 in Orlando, Florida.
Javier Hernán Pino	2015–2017	3 life sentences	Argentina	Serial killer who befriended and deceived five people into trusting him, before shooting them in the head with a silenced pistol and robbing them of their belongings.
Jerry Brudos	1969	3 life sentences	United States	Serial killer known as "the Shoe Fetish Slayer" because of his compulsive attraction to women's shoes. Confessed to four murders but was convicted of only three because the first body was never found. Died of cancer at Oregon State Penitentiary in 2006.
Bernard Pesquet	1982	3 life sentences	France	Serial killer known as "The Landru of Val-d'Oise".
Bernhard Prigan	1953	3 life sentences	Germany	Serial killer known as "The Highway Killer" who killed at least three women between the end of the 1940s and the early 1950s. Unlike today, a total sentence of several life imprisonments was not yet formed.
W. A. Boyle	1974	3 life sentences	United States	President of the United Mine Workers of America, found guilty of hiring hitmen to kill a challenger for his position, Joseph Yablonski, in 1969; Yablonski's wife and daughter were also killed. Died in prison in 1985.
Michele Zagaria	2011	3 life sentences	Italy	Boss of the Casalesi clan from 1998. Zagaria was life sentenced in absentia at Spartacus Trial in 2008 and was caught in 2011 after 16 years hiding.
Ferdinando Cesarano	2000	3 life sentences	Italy	Camorra boss at Neapolitan city of Pompei who was famous for escaping prison climbing down a trapdoor at Salerno prison-court in 1998. Two years later, Ferdinando was rearrested and he's still serving his sentence at harsh 41-bis prison regime for Torre Annunziata massacre.
Jeffrey R. MacDonald	1979	3 life sentences	United States	Medical doctor who murdered his pregnant wife and two daughters.
Amos Earl Robinson	1984	3 life sentences	United States	Serial killer and accomplice of Abron Scott convicted of the 1983 abduction-murder of Carlos Orellana and the prison killings of Arturi Verra and Sang Thanh Nguyen in 1998 and 2004 respectively. He was originally sentenced to death for the Orellana case before the sentence was commuted to life imprisonment.
Abron Scott	1984	3 life sentences	United States	Serial killer and accomplice of Amos Robinson who was convicted of the 1983 abduction-murder of Carlos Orellana and 1983 rape-murders of Lisa Lansen and Barbara Grams. He was originally sentenced to death for the Orellana case before the sentence was commuted to life imprisonment.
Chevie Kehoe	1999	3 life sentences	United States	White supremacist convicted of the murder of a family of three. His accomplice, Daniel Lewis Lee was sentenced to death for the same crime.
Reggie Gross	1989	3 life sentences	United States	Heavyweight boxer incarcerated in South Carolina for murdering three people over a card game.
Keith Hunter Jesperson	1995	3 life sentences	United States	Serial killer known as "The Happy Face Killer."
Chevie Kehoe	1999	3 life sentences	United States	White supremacist convicted of the murder of a family of three. His accomplice, Daniel Lewis Lee was sentenced to death for the same crime.
Sef Gonzales	2004	3 life sentences	Australia	Filipino immigrant who killed his father, mother and sister in North Ryde, New South Wales, and tried to disguise the murders as hate crimes.
Juan Covington	2005	3 life sentences	United States	Serial killer active in Philadelphia.
James Ford Seale	2007	3 life sentences	United States	Ku Klux Klan member convicted for the 1964 kidnapping of Henry Hezekiah Dee and Charles Eddie Moore in Meadville, Mississippi, who were subsequently murdered. The sentence was overturned in 2008, arguing that the statute of limitations had run out, but was later reinstated in 2009. Died in prison in 2011.
Eiken Elam Saimon	2007	3 life sentences	United States	Micronesian national who opened fire on a church congregation in Neosho, Missouri, two days after raping a fourteen-year-old girl.
Manfred Wittmann	1971	3 life sentences	Germany	Serial killer known as "The Staffelstein Killer".
Dudley Wayne Kyzer	1981	2 life sentences plus 10,000 years	United States	Convicted of killing his estranged wife, Diane Kyzer, his mother-in-law, Eunice Barringer, and college student Rick Pyron who just happened to be at the Barringer home in Alabama on Halloween in 1976. Received 10,000 years for the murder of his wife and 2 life sentences for the other two killings.
James Alex Fields Jr.	2019	2 life sentences plus 419 years	United States	Perpetrator of the Charlottesville car attack.
Robert Lee Yates	2000	2 life sentences without parole plus 408 years	United States	Serial killer who Pleaded guilty to 13 murders in order to avoid the death penalty. Was sentenced to two death penalties the following year for other murders, but they will not be carried out until the earlier sentence is completed. However, the two death sentences were commuted to life without parole after the Washington State Supreme Court ruled the death penalty unconstitutional in 2018.
Ramzi Yousef	1995	2 life sentences without parole plus 240 years in solitary confinement	United States	Perpetrator of the 1993 World Trade Center Bombing, bombing of Philippine Airlines Flight 434 and co-conspirator in the Bojinka plot.
Eugene de Kock	1996	2 life sentences plus 212 years	South Africa	South African Police (SAP) colonel during apartheid era who was the leader of the secret Counterinsurgence Unit 10, also known as C10 or "Vlakplaas", which abducted, tortured and murdered hundreds of anti-apartheid activists in the 1980s. Personally found guilty of 89 charges, including six murders. Was granted parole in 2015.
Leslie Alfred Camilleri	1997	2 life sentences plus 183 years without parole	Australia	Victorian prison escapee and perpetrator of the Bega Schoolgirl Murders. Also convicted of the 1992 murder of Prue Bird.
John Timothy Earnest	2021	2 life sentences plus 167 years	United States	Perpetrator of the Escondido mosque fire and Poway synagogue shooting. Earnest was first convicted by the State of California to a life sentence without parole, a separate 121 years-to-life sentence, and a further 16 years. A few months later, he was given life without parole plus 30 years in federal court.
Gabe Parker	2020	2 life sentences without parole for 20 years plus 70 years	United States	Perpetrator of the Marshall County High School Shooting.
Auburn Calloway	1995	2 life sentences without parole	United States	Convicted of attempted murder, attempted aircraft piracy, and interference with flight crew operations after attempting to hijack and crash a McDonell Douglas DC-10-30 operating as Federal Express Flight 705.
Henry Eugene Hodges	1990	2 life sentences plus 70 years	United States	Hodges confessed to murdering at least eight homosexual men, and was ultimately convicted of three murders committed in Georgia and Tennessee. Hodges was given two life terms and 70 years for two of the killings, and also sentenced to death for the third murder.
Ronald A. Baker	2012	2 life sentences without parole plus 65 years	United States	Former Seminole, FL, police officer who repeatedly sexually assaulted his daughter from age 8 until she was 17. He also photographed his sexual assaults.
Alparslan Arslan	2006	2 life sentences plus 60 years	Turkey	Murderer of Mustafa Yücel Özbilgin and one of the bombers of the newspaper Cumhuriyet.
Richard Kuklinski	1986	2 life sentences plus 60 years	United States	Serial killer who lent his services for DeCavalcante crime family and New York City's Five Families.
Naser Jason Abdo	2012	2 consecutive life sentences plus 60 years without parole	United States	Attempted to commit a terrorist attack against a restaurant in Fort Hood, Texas, in 2011.
John Albert Gardner	2010	2 life sentences plus 49+ years (one sentence of 24 years and another of 25 years to life)	United States	Serial rapist and murderer of teenage girls in California.
Jake Thomas Patterson	2019	2 life sentences without parole plus 40 years	United States	Perpetrator of the kidnapping of Jayme Closs.
Matthew James Harris	2000	2 life sentences without parole plus 40 years	Australia	Serial killer. Tried to overdose twice before his arrest.
Ross Ulbricht	2015	2 life sentences without parole plus 40 years	United States	Convicted of a Continuing Criminal Enterprise in United States federal court for operating the Silk Road darknet site. Pardoned by President Donald Trump in 2025.
Michael Boatwright	2018	2 life sentences without parole plus 30 years	United States	Murdered 20-year old rapper and singer-songwriter Jahseh Onfroy, a.k.a. XXXTentacion
Richard Lee McNair	1988	2 life sentences plus 30 years	United States	Killed a man and attempted to kill another during a botched burglary.
Marlon Legere	2006	2 life sentences without parole plus 26 years	United States	Murderer of two NYPD detectives. Evaded the death penalty because it was abolished in the State of New York three months before his trial.
Anders Eklund	2008	2 life sentences without parole plus 22 years	Sweden	Murderer and rapist convicted of killing a 31-year-old woman in 2000 and a 10-year-old girl in 2008.
Adnan Darwiche	2006	2 life sentences without parole plus 20 years	Australia	Convicted in the Darwiche–Razzak–Fahda family conflict trial.
Sarah Marie Johnson	2005	2 life sentences without parole plus 15 years	United States	Murdered her parents Diane and Alan Scott in 2003 when she was 16. Also convicted for enhancing the firearm she used in committing the parricide.
Gerry Kelly	1973	2 life sentences plus 20 years	United Kingdom	PIRA member, convicted when he was nineteen years old, for his part in a plot to detonate four car bombs in London, two of which exploded successfully and injured 200 people. Became a politician for Sinn Féin following his release in 1989, and was one of the leading Republican negotiators of the Good Friday Agreement.
Beh Meng Chai	1984	2 life sentences plus 20 years (all concurrent)	Singapore	Found guilty of the double manslaughter of Teo Keng Siang and Lee Cheng Tiong in the 1980 Jurong fishing port murders. Also received 24 strokes of the cane.
Myra Hindley	1966	2 life sentences plus 7 years	United Kingdom	Perpetrator of the Moors Murders along with her boyfriend, Ian Brady. Died in prison in 2002.
James "Whitey" Bulger	2011	2 life sentences plus 5 years	United States	Boss of the Winter Hill Gang who was 16 years hiding until his 2011 arrest and sentenced for 11 murders with agonizing suffering as well as for racketeering, money laundering, drug trafficking and criminal possession of firearms
Trystan Terrell	2019	2 life sentences without parole	United States	Perpetrator of the 2019 University of North Carolina at Charlotte shooting.
Wayne Lo	1994	2 life sentences without parole	United States	Taiwanese-born perpetrator of the 1992 Simon's Rock College of Bard shooting, in which one student and one professor died, and four students were wounded.
Johnny Avalos	2019	2 life sentences without parole	United States	Raped and murdered five people around the San Antonio area between 2012 and 2015.
Mark Valera	2000	2 life sentences without parole	Australia	Double murderer.
Ward Weaver III	2004	2 life sentences without parole	United States	Double murderer and rapist.
Raymond Glen Bassett	1993	2 life sentences without parole for 34 years	Australia	Spree killer captured after the 1993 Cangai Siege. Sentenced in New South Wales for three counts of accessory to murder, and in Queensland for two murders.
John Sharpe	2005	2 life sentences without parole for 33 years	Australia	Murdered his wife and daughter. Held in solitary due to threats made to him by other prisoners.
Bilal Abdullah	2009	2 life sentences without parole for 32 years	United Kingdom	Perpetrator of the 2007 London car bombs plot and the Glasgow Airport Attack.
Antonio Rotolo	1985	2 life sentences without parole for 32 years	Italy	Boss of the Sicilian Mafia at Palermo in Pagliarelli neighborhood, at first boss Giuseppe Calò's right hand and then, boss Salvatore Lo Piccolo's rival. He was life sentenced for commanding murders precisely during his short-clash with Lo Piccolo.
Lloyd Crosbie	2003	2 life sentences without parole for 30 years	Australia	Murdered his girlfriend and his girlfriend's mother so he could be together with his older brothers in prison.
Ben William McLean	2005	2 life sentences without parole for 25 years	Australia	Killed two Thai prostitutes in Darwin and claimed that the Hells Angels had forced them to commit the crimes.
Phu Ngoc Trinh	2005	2 life sentences without parole for 25 years	Australia	Killed two Thai prostitutes in Darwin and claimed that the Hells Angels had forced them to commit the crimes.
Gerald Mason	2003	2 life sentences without parole for 7 years	United States	South Carolina gas station owner convicted in a notorious decades-long cold case, the murder of two police officers in El Segundo, California, in 1957. Died in prison in 2017.
V. O. Chidambaram Pillai	1908	2 life sentences	India	Tamil shipping magnate and political leader imprisoned for sedition against the British colonial government. During his imprisonment he was subjected to harsh labor despite it not being part of his sentence. Though released in 1912, he found that his company had been liquidated the previous year.
Antonio Correa Cotto	Before 1950	2 life sentences	(United States) Puerto Rico	Incarcerated for two murders in Ponce, after which he led a prison riot and escape. After murdering an unknown number of prison guards and ten other people outside the prison over the course of two years, he was located in a farm by police and killed in a shootout.
Frank Wetzel	1957	2 life sentences	United States	Convicted for the murders of two highway patrolmen when he was driving to Mississippi to break his brother out of death row. His brother was executed two months later. Wetzel died of Alzheimer's disease in 2012, still in prison.
J. J. Jameson	1961	2 life sentences	United States	Originally arrested in 1960 for the killing of a store clerk, Jameson murdered a prison guard and escaped before trial, but was arrested again when he was robbing a grocery store. One of the life sentences was commuted in 1975 by Massachusetts governor, Michael Dukakis. He escaped again in 1985 and wasn't recaptured until 2005.
Ancell E. Hamm	1972	2 life sentences	United States	Member of Bruce Johnston's gang, convicted of murdering two policemen.
Marian Price	1973	2 life sentences	United Kingdom	Provisional IRA Belfast Brigade member, sentenced for her part in the 1973 Old Bailey bombing. Released in 1980.
Manuel Abimael Guzman	1992	2 life sentences	Peru	Leader of the Shining Path between 1969 and 1992, life sentenced for coordinating the Tarata bombing.
Angelo Nuvoletta	2001	2 life sentences	Italy	Camorra boss in Neapolitan city of Marano di Napoli, sentenced for 6 murders including the journalist Giancarlo Siani who was investigating settlings of score among the different Camorra clans.
Domenico Papalia	1977	2 life sentences	Italy	Ndrangheta boss in Calabrian city of Platì, sentenced for 2 murders
Leonard Peltier	1977	2 life sentences	United States	Convicted for the murders of two FBI agents during the 1975 Pine Ridge Indian Reservation standoff. Sentence commuted under president Joe Biden in 2025.
Steven Benson	1985	2 life sentences	United States	Killed his mother and brother, and gravely injured his sister with a car bomb. Died in prison in 2015.
Jack Carlton Reed	1987	2 life sentences	United States	Pilot who smuggled cocaine from Norman's Cay in the Bahamas to Florida on behalf of Colombian drug lord Carlos Lehder. Sentence shortened to time served and released in 2009, shortly before he died.
Dorothea Puente	1988	2 life sentences	United States	Boarding house director who murdered her elderly and mentally disabled boarders in order to cash on their Social Security checks. Died in prison in 2011.
Jens Söring	1990	2 life sentences	United States	Son of a West German diplomat convicted of murdering the parents of his girlfriend, Elizabeth Haysom, a Canadian citizen. Söring and Haysom were arrested in the United Kingdom and extradited to the United States on the condition that neither would face the death penalty. Haysom was sentenced to 90 years in prison in return for testifying against Söring, who denies responsibility. Söring has been released and has been deported to Germany in December 2019.
Christopher Scarver	1994	2 life sentences	United States	Convicted to two life sentences for the prison murders of two other inmates, serial killer Jeffrey Dahmer and Jesse Anderson, who had murdered his wife and tried to incriminate two innocent men. Scarver was already serving a life sentence for murder at the time.
Theresa Knorr	1995	2 life sentences	United States	Tortured and murdered two of her six children and used the others to cover up her crimes.
Robert Joseph Silveria Jr.	1996	2 life sentences	United States	Serial killer and member of the Freight Train Riders of America, nicknamed "the Boxcar Killer". Attributed 9–14 murders, claims 24 himself.
Caleb Fairley	1996	2 life sentences	United States	Clothing store clerk who abducted a mother and her child when they were shopping there, and murdered both after raping the woman.
William Leonard Pickard	1999	2 life sentences	United States	Largest manufacturer of LSD in the US at the time of his arrest.
Rodney Berget	2003	2 life sentences	United States	Convicted of kidnapping and attempted murder in 2003. Executed in 2018 for the 2012 murder of a corrections officer during a failed prison escape attempt at South Dakota State Penitentiary.
Amy Hebert	2009	2 life sentences	United States	Murdered her children, Camille and Braxton, to punish her ex-husband.
V. V. Hamsa	2010	2 life sentences	India	Found guilty of the abduction and murder of progressive Islamic cleric Chekannur Maulavi in Edappal, Kerala in 1993. 9 other people were also charged in this case but found innocent.
Michael Joe Nordman	2012	2 consecutive life sentences	United States	Received one life term for raping a young girl in 1990, and also given a second life term for the 2012 murder of a corrections officer at South Dakota State Penitentiary.
Soh Wee Kian	2013	2 life sentences	Singapore	Found guilty of the brutal manslaughter of Hoe Hong Lin and the stabbing of How Poh Ling.
Richard Valenti	1973–1974	2 life sentences	United States	Serial killer found guilty of killing two teenage girls in 1973, and suspected of murdering a third teenage girl in 1974.
Leo Boatman	2006	2 consecutive life sentences without parole, plus 15 years	United States	Killed four people (including two prisoners) from 2003 to 2019. Sentenced to death for the fourth and final murder, plus the life terms and 15 years for the remaining three victims.
Ahmad Khan Rahimi	2018	2 life sentences without parole	United States	Perpetrator of 2016 New York and New Jersey bombings, in which 35 people were injured.
Alex Murdaugh	2023	2 consecutive life sentences without parole	United States	Killed his wife Maggie Murdaugh and son Paul Murdaugh in 2021.
Harry "Taco" Bowman	1999	2 life sentences plus 83 years	United States	Boss of the Outlaws Biker Gang, sentenced to life for racketeering, drug trafficking, bombing the Hells Angels Oakland and Ventura Clubhouse, criminal possession of guns, multiple assassinations and the attempted assassination of George Christie. Died in 2019 of liver cancer in a prison hospital at FMC Butner.
Gerard Booker	1993	2 life sentences plus 25 years	United States	Part of a four-man group convicted of killing two men in the 1992 Kissimmee carjacking murders. Received life without parole plus 25 years in a federal prison for federal carjacking charges, and an additional life sentence in state prison for state first-degree murder charges.
Alf Catholic	1993	2 life sentences plus 25 years	United States	Part of a four-man group convicted of killing two men in the 1992 Kissimmee carjacking murders. Received life without parole plus 25 years in a federal prison for federal carjacking charges, and an additional life sentence in state prison for state first-degree murder charges.
Jimmy O'Neal Spencer	1984	2 life sentences plus 25 years	United States	Received his first life sentence for burglary due to repeated felony convictions, and later a second life term due to an escape attempt from prison in 1993. Later sentenced to death for a triple murder he committed in 2018 while out on parole.

== Prisoners sentenced to one life imprisonment plus added time ==
Name	Sentence start	Sentence term	Country	Description
Devon Erickson	2021	Life without parole plus 1,282 years	United States	Co-perpetrator of the 2019 STEM School Highlands Ranch shooting, during which 18-year-old student Kendrick Castillo was killed as he and other classmates tackled Erickson to the ground. He was convicted on 46 counts, including first-degree murder, attempted first-degree murder, conspiracy to commit first-degree murder and supplying a juvenile with a handgun.
Bryan Cage	2021	Life without parole plus 1,248 years	United States	Convicted in May 2021 of attempted capital murder of a police officer and numerous child pornography, weapon, and drug offenses.
Ariel Castro	2013	Life without parole plus 1,000 years	United States	Serial rapist who abducted and held three young women captive in his Cleveland, Ohio, home for over a decade. Pleaded guilty to 900 counts of kidnapping and rape in order to avoid a possible death sentence for inducing five miscarriages on one of his victims through violence, poisoning and starvation. Hanged himself in prison, only one month into his sentence. He could have got death penalty plus 9846 years and 6 months if convicted.
Anthony Casso	1998	Life plus 455 years	United States	Underboss of the Lucchese crime family who murdered Frank DeCicco with a car bomb, and shot Roy DeMeo and Vladimir Reznikov in 1983 and 1986. Died of COVID-19 in a prison hospital at FMC Butner in 2020.
Bruce Rykeisedagiquan Chambers	2017	Life without parole plus 245 years	United States	Members of the 64 Brims gang. Chambers shot and seriously injured a 20-year-old man in 2017 during a gang-related armed robbery, which Salaam oversaw and approved, the release said. Chambers was convicted of 14 felonies, while Salaam was found guilty of six.
Ishmael Abdultaliv Salaam	2017	Life without parole plus 100 years	United States	Members of the 64 Brims gang. Chambers shot and seriously injured a 20-year-old man in 2017 during a gang-related armed robbery, which Salaam oversaw and approved, the release said. Chambers was convicted of 14 felonies, while Salaam was found guilty of six.
Carlos Sigears	2024	Life plus 160 years	United States	Convicted of sexual assault of a juvenile in Arkansas.
Carmine Persico	1985	Life plus 139 years	United States	Boss of the Colombo crime family since 1972 who continued controlling the organization from prison until 2019. Persico received his sentence at Mafia Commission Trial.
Carlos Lehder	1987	Life plus 135 years	United States	Colombian drug lord who co-founded the Medellín Cartel and the paramilitary group Muerte a Secuestradores. Sentence reduced to 55 years in 1992 in exchange for testifying against Manuel Noriega.
Peter Scully	2018	Life plus 129 years	Philippines	Australian sex offender charged in 2015 with rape, human trafficking, production and dissemination of child pornography, and torture of 75 children, as well as the alleged murder of an 11-year-old girl. Sentenced to life in prison in 2018, and received an additional 129 years for a second conviction in 2022.
Sante Kimes	1998	Life plus 125 years without parole	United States	Con artist convicted of murdering two people. Died in prison in 2014.
Naveed Afzal Haq	2009	Life plus 120 years	United States	Perpetrator of the Seattle Jewish Federation shooting.
Nathan Dunlap	2020	Life without parole plus 108 years	United States	Perpetrator of the 1993 Aurora, Colorado, shooting. Originally sentenced to death, later commuted to life.
Anthony Corallo	1986	Life plus 100 years	United States	Former boss of the Lucchese crime family, who was convicted for racketeering and loansharking. Died in 2000 at MCFP Springfield.
Vittorio Amuso	1991	Life plus 100 years	United States	Boss of the Lucchese crime family, who was life sentenced for racketeering and 36 murders. Currently, Amuso serves his sentence at Federal Correctional Complex, Butner
John Gotti	1990	Life plus 100 years without parole	United States	Former boss of the Gambino crime family, who planned 19 murders (including Paul Castellano and Tommy Bilotti in 1985), engaged in racketeering, engaged in loansharking, drug distribution and obstruction of justice. Died of throat cancer in the prison hospital at MCFP Springfield in 2002.
Frank LoCascio	1990	Life plus 100 years without parole	United States	Former consigliere of the Gambino crime family, who was co-sentenced to Gotti. Died by natural causes in the prison hospital at Devens in 2021.
Hamdi Quran	2007	Life plus 100 years	Israel	PFLP member convicted for the murder of Israeli Minister of Tourism Rehavam Ze'evi.
Giovanni Tegano	2010	Life plus 100 years	Italy	Boss of the De Stefano-Tegano 'ndrina since 1991. Tegano received life imprisonment in absentia at Olimpia trial in 2001 and finally was caught in 2010 after 17 years on run.
Stephen Caracappa and Louis Eppolito	2006	Life plus 100 years	United States	Two corrupt NYPD detectives which worked both Lucchese both Gambino crime family that's why were nicknamed Mafia Cops. They were sentenced for 8 murders, attempted murder, drug trafficking, money laundering and racketeering..
Ralph "Bucky" Phillips	2006	Life without parole plus 80 years	United States	Fugitive from Erie County jail who shot three New York State Troopers, killing one.
Jacques Plumain	2001	Life without parole plus 62 years	France	Serial killer known as "The Ghost of Kehl"
Allan Baker	1973	Life plus 55 years	Australia	Burglars who became friends in prison and killed a man and a woman after being paroled, and shot at police, wounding an officer before surrendering after a siege. The woman was also abducted, repeatedly raped and tortured by both.
Kevin Crump	1973	Life plus 55 years	Australia	Burglars who became friends in prison and killed a man and a woman after being paroled, and shot at police, wounding an officer before surrendering after a siege. The woman was also abducted, repeatedly raped and tortured by both.
John Travers	1987	Life plus 65 years	Australia	Murderers of Anita Cobby. All except Gary Murphy (life plus 48 years) were originally sentenced to life plus 50 years: Michael Murphy's sentence was ordered to commence on the expiration of a 25-year sentence previously imposed. Travers, Gary Murphy, and Les Murphy have since been sentenced to additional time for other offending prior to the murder and in prison. Michael Murphy died in prison in February 2019.
Michael Murdoch	1987	Life plus 50 years	Australia	Murderers of Anita Cobby. All except Gary Murphy (life plus 48 years) were originally sentenced to life plus 50 years: Michael Murphy's sentence was ordered to commence on the expiration of a 25-year sentence previously imposed. Travers, Gary Murphy, and Les Murphy have since been sentenced to additional time for other offending prior to the murder and in prison. Michael Murphy died in prison in February 2019.
Michael Murphy	1987	Life plus 75 years	Australia	Murderers of Anita Cobby. All except Gary Murphy (life plus 48 years) were originally sentenced to life plus 50 years: Michael Murphy's sentence was ordered to commence on the expiration of a 25-year sentence previously imposed. Travers, Gary Murphy, and Les Murphy have since been sentenced to additional time for other offending prior to the murder and in prison. Michael Murphy died in prison in February 2019.
Gary Murphy	1987	Life plus 50 years	Australia	Murderers of Anita Cobby. All except Gary Murphy (life plus 48 years) were originally sentenced to life plus 50 years: Michael Murphy's sentence was ordered to commence on the expiration of a 25-year sentence previously imposed. Travers, Gary Murphy, and Les Murphy have since been sentenced to additional time for other offending prior to the murder and in prison. Michael Murphy died in prison in February 2019.
Les Murphy	1987	Life plus 66 years	Australia	Murderers of Anita Cobby. All except Gary Murphy (life plus 48 years) were originally sentenced to life plus 50 years: Michael Murphy's sentence was ordered to commence on the expiration of a 25-year sentence previously imposed. Travers, Gary Murphy, and Les Murphy have since been sentenced to additional time for other offending prior to the murder and in prison. Michael Murphy died in prison in February 2019.
Kevin Strickland	1978	Life plus 50 years	United States	Kansas City citizen who was wrongfully life sentenced for a violent robbery that left 3 slaughtered. In 2021, was exonerated because the judge considered the trial wasn't based on physical evidence but on eye-witness testimony
Attina Marie Cannaday	1984	Life plus 50 years	United States	Originally sentenced to death for the kidnap and murder of a man; the sentence was changed because she was only 16 at the time. Paroled in 2008.
Luis Felipe	1997	Life plus 45 years	United States	Founder of the New York chapter of the Latin Kings, convicted of ordering several murders while he was already in prison. Serves his sentence in solitary confinement.
Baldassare Amato	1999	Life plus 45 years	United States	Sicilian mobster of the Bonanno crime family, who was sentenced for having murdered the mobsters Robert Perrino, Joseph Platia and Sebastiano DiFalco. It's believed that he also participated in the boss Carmine Galante's murder, however, this suspicion was never turned into sentence.
Gaetano Badalamenti	1984	Life plus 45 years	United States	Boss of the Sicilian Mafia in the village of Cinisi who headed the Pizza Connection, a network of pizzerias in New York used as fronts for drug trafficking, mainly heroin. Badalamenti was arrested in 1984 and extradited to the U.S., where he was prosecuted and sentenced to life plus 45 years for this case and for the murder of journalist Giuseppe Impastato.
Charles Carneglia	2008	Life plus 45 years	United States	Soldier of the Gambino crime family and in past, boss John Gotti's loyalist. Carneglia was arrested in 2008 at Operation Old Bridge and life sentenced for murder, robbery, kidnapping, extortion, security fraud and drug trafficking
Bruce Burrell	2006	Life plus 44 years	Australia	Convicted of murdering two women though their bodies were never found. Died in prison in 2016.
Granville Ritchie	2020	Life without parole plus 40 years	United States	Ritchie, a Jamaican man, has been arrested first for possessing MDMA, then after he killed 9 year old Felicia Williams, he had possessed 20+ grams of marijuana. He was sentenced to death for her murder. Then, Judge Sisco gave Life without parole for the rape, and then 30 years were added to the aggravated child abuse, and 5 years for each drug possession.
Bernadette McNeilly	1993	Life without parole for 25 years, plus 40 years	United Kingdom	Murderers of Suzanne Capper.
Jean Powell	1993	Life without parole for 25 years, plus 40 years	United Kingdom	Murderers of Suzanne Capper.
Glyn Powell	1993	Life without parole for 25 years, plus 40 years	United Kingdom	Murderers of Suzanne Capper.
Yoon Suk Yeol	2026	Life plus 37 years	South Korea	Former president of South Korea, removed from office for his short-lived martial law declaration and then convicted of leading an insurrection. Sentenced to additional five years' imprisonment on related charges of abuse of power, obstruction of justice, and falsification of official documents; subsequently increased to seven years on appeal. Received 30 more years in prison for treason after the drone operation aimed at provoking North Korea as a justification for the temporary martial law.
Maurice Boucher	2000	Life without parole plus 35 years	Canada	President of the Hells Angels Motorcycle Club at Quebec, jailed from 2000 and life sentenced for efforting to destabilize the Canadian justice with 1997 two prison guards's killing at Quebec.
Somchai Wisetsingh	2004	Life plus 33 years and 4 months	Thailand	Police officer convicted of murdering two British backpackers after an argument.
Yishai Schlissel	2015	Life plus 31 years	Israel	Ultra-orthodox religious extremist convicted of stabbing six people during the 2015 Jerusalem pride parade, killing one of them. Had gone on a previous stabbing rampage in 2005.
Arthur Hutchinson	1983	Life plus 31 years	United Kingdom	Triple murderer who broke into the home of the Laitner family where he stabbed Basil Laitner, 59, Avril Laitner, 55, and their son, Richard Laitner, 28, to death before raping their daughter, Nicola Laitner, 18, at least twice before going on the run. Hutchinson was arrested in 1983 and sentenced by Judge J. McNeil in 1984 to life imprisonment plus 31 years for rape and aggressive burglary. Later, this sentence was changed to a whole life order on December 16, 1994, by Home Secretary Leon Brittan.
Kray Twins (Ronnie and Reggie)	1968	Life plus 30 years	United Kingdom	Twin brothers gangsters who founded of the Kray Firm gang, engaged in armed robbery, extortion, gambling and nightclubs. The Kray were serving life imprisonment for murder until Ronnie died in 1995 by heart attack and Reggie by bladder cancer in 2000.
Sundiata Acoli	1974	Life plus 30 years	United States	Member of the Black Panther Party and Black Liberation Army. Convicted for the death of a New Jersey state trooper during a shooting in which Zayd Malik Shakur was also killed and Assata Shakur was wounded.
Yolanda Saldívar	1995	Life plus 30 years	United States	Murderer of the singer Selena.
Joaquín "El Chapo" Guzmán	2019	Life plus 30 years	United States	Drug lord and disposed leader of the Sinaloa Cartel, who broke out of two Mexican jails and went on the run for over a decade until he was caught in 2016 during Operation Black Swan.
Brian Draper and Torey Adamcik	2007	Life without parole plus 30 years	United States	Murdered classmate Cassie Jo Stoddart in her aunt and uncle's home on September 22, 2006.
Giovanni Strangio	2009	Life without parole plus 30 years	Italy	Italian gunman of the Ndrangheta who masterminded and perpetrated the 2007 Duisburg massacre in which 6 Italian fugitives members at opposite 'ndrina of the Pelle-Vottari were murdered in Germany, whose crime Strangio received life imprisonment plus 30 years in solitary confinement by a Calabrian court.
Mario Trudu	1987	Life without parole plus 30 years	Italy	Italian herder member of the kidnappers gang Anonima sarda. Trudu served his sentence in solitary confinement for two kidnappings turned in killings until his death in 2019
Arthur Hosein	1970	Life plus 25 years	United Kingdom	Kidnapper and presumed murderer of Muriel McKay.
Antonis Daglis	1997	Life plus 25 years	Greece	Serial killer known as "the Athens Ripper." Killed himself seven months after his conviction.
Freddy Horion	1987	Life plus 25 years	Belgium	Thief who was life sentenced for slaughtering a car dealer named Ronald Steyaert and 5 relatives during a violent robbery in June 1979.
Junior Kabunda	2009	Life plus 25 years	Belgium	Serial killer known as "The Monster of Brussels"
Étienne Dedroog	2014	Life plus 25 years	Belgium	Serial killer known as "The Lodgers' Killer" and "B&B Murderer". Sentenced to life by Belgium and 25 years by France.
Juri Sulimov	1994	Life plus 25 years	Estonia	Serial killer who killed 2 prisoners and 1 civilian. Previously sentenced to death but his sentence for the murder of the last victim had been commuted to life. He was also given 15 years for the second murder, 5 years for the first murder, and 5 years for the attempted murder.
Ethan Crumbley	2023	Life without parole plus 24 years	United States	Sentenced to life without parole plus 24 years for the murders of four students in the 2021 Oxford High School shooting.
Esa Åkerlund	2010	Life plus 23 years and 6 months	Finland	Serial killer responsible for the Porvoo triple murder.
John Leonard Orr	1998	Life without parole plus 20 years	United States	Serial arsonist who worked as a fire captain in Glendale, California. Four people died in fires that he caused.
Travis McMichael	2021	Life without parole plus 20 years	United States	Murderers of Ahmaud Arbery.
Greg McMichael	2021	Life without parole plus 20 years	United States	Murderers of Ahmaud Arbery.
Garrett Brock Trapnell	1972	Life plus 20 years	United States	Con man, bank robber and aircraft hijacker skilled at faking insanity to get off previous charges. Died in prison in 1993.
Audrey Marie Hilley	1983	Life plus 20 years	United States	Con woman who poisoned her relatives to cash on their life insurance policies. Convicted of murdering her last husband and attempting to murder their daughter. Died in 1987 from hypothermia suffered during an escape attempt.
Charles Altiéri	1993	Life plus 20 years	France	French drug dealer of the Marseille Milieu who was given life imprisonment in absentia in 1991 for the anti-drug prosecutor Pierre Michel's murder. In 1993, was arrested at Cyprus while he had a false passport and then, extradited to France where he served his sentence until 2014 when was paroled
Rémy Roy	1991	Life plus 20 years	France	Serial killer known as "The Minitel Killer". Rémy Roy was life sentenced for having murdered 3 gay men and attempting murder to 4th between 1990 and 1991 for homophobia reasons.
Joseph-Thomas Recco	1980	Life plus 20 years	France	Serial killer who in 1960 was life sentenced for his godfather's murder and in 1977 was paroled for prison good behavior. But was rearrested in 1980 and life sentenced plus 20 years in preventative detention because his parole had committed 2 massacres in French cities of Béziers and Carqueiranne between late 1979-early 1980
Marcel Barbeault	1976	Life plus 20 years	France	Serial killer in French city of Nogent-sur-Oise who was known as "The Shadow Killer" given that he murdered at night to then vanish without to be seen until was arrested in 1976 and was life sentenced thanks to ballistic analysis matched bullets from his gun to those used in 8 killings and 3 attempting murders committed between 1969 and 1976.
Wayne DuMond	1985	Life plus 20 years	United States	Ex-Marine who raped 17 year-old cheerleader Ashley Stevens in Arkansas, a third cousin of then governor Bill Clinton. Before trial, DuMond was castrated in his own home and his testicles were subsequently flushed down a toilet by a local sheriff. The sentence was reduced to 39 years in 1992, and DuMond was later paroled in 1999.
Erika Sifrit	2003	Life plus 20 years	United States	Murdered two tourists from Virginia in Maryland. Her husband and accomplice was sentenced to 38 years in prison.
Warren Jeffs	2011	Life plus 20 years	United States	Polygamous cult leader found guilty of raping two child brides aged 15 and 12.
Abdul Nasir Amer Hamsah	1996–1997	Life plus 18 years	Singapore	Found guilty of the kidnapping of two policemen and causing the death of a Japanese tourist during a robbery. Also received 30 strokes of the cane
Nizamodeen Hosein	1970	Life plus 15 years	United Kingdom	Kidnapper and presumed murderer of Muriel McKay.
El Sayyid Nosair	1994	Life plus 15 years	United States	Convicted for his part in the New York City landmark bomb plot. Also tried for the assassination of Meir Kahane but acquitted.
Omar Abdel-Rahman	1996	Life plus 15 years	United States	Known as "the Blind Sheikh." Alleged leader of al-Jama'a al-Islamiyya convicted of seditious conspiracy for his part in the foiled New York City landmark bomb plot. Died at Federal Medical Center, Butner in 2017.
Luciano Leggio	1974	Life plus 15 years	Italy	Leggio murdered his predecessor Michele Navarra to become the Corleonesi mafia leader. After years of acquittals, finally the examining judge Cesare Terranova made arresting Leggio and sentencing life plus 15 years for Navarra's murder.
Yigal Amir	1996	Life plus 14 years	Israel	Convicted for the assassination of Yitzhak Rabin.
Brian Cohee	2023	Life without parole plus 13.5 years	United States	Convicted of the murder of Warren Barnes.
Per Kristian Liland	1970	Life plus 10 years	Norway	Convicted of a double axe murder, later acquitted in 1994.
Mehmet Ali Ağca	1981	Life plus 10 years	Turkey	Terrorist sentenced for wounding pope John Paul II. In 2000, was pardoned by Italian president Carlo Azeglio Ciampi and extradited to Turkey where he must serve other 10 years for other crimes. Finally, he was paroled in January 2010.
Frank Calabrese Sr.	1997	Life plus 10 years	United States	Mobster of Chicago Outfit who received life imprisonment in the trial Operation Family Secrets for 18 murders including mobster Anthony Spilotro and his brother Michael as well for racketeering, extortion and loansharking. Calabrese Sr. died in 2012 at Federal Medical Center, Butner
James Charles Kopp	2007	Life plus 10 years	United States	Member of The Lambs of Christ who sniped a physician providing abortions, Barnett Slepian.
Tom Menheniott	1977	Life plus 5 years	United Kingdom	Physically abused and murdered his 18-year-old son, who had learning difficulties, in the Isles of Scilly. The case called into question the way the victim was dealt with by social services and led to questions in the British Parliament and an inquiry.

== See also ==
- List of longest prison sentences
- List of longest prison sentences served
