= Kissimmee carjacking murders =

1992 carjacking and double murder case in Florida

- Location: Kissimmee, Florida, United States
- Date: November 29, 1992; 33 years ago
- Attack type: Carjacking and murder
- Weapon: Gun
- Deaths: Anthony Faiella, 17; Anthony Clifton, 20
- Injuries: Michael Rentas, 20
- Verdict: Guilty
- Convictions: Federal; Carjacking; Conspiracy; Use of firearms State; First-degree murder (2 counts); Attempted murder Kidnapping (4 counts)
- Sentence: Federal: Foster: Life without parole plus 25 years; Booker: Life without parole plus 25 years; Catholic: Life without parole plus 25 years; Henderson: 33 years' imprisonment; State: Foster: Death penalty; Booker: Life imprisonment; Catholic: Life imprisonment; Henderson: Life imprisonment
- Convicted: Jermaine Foster; Alf Catholic; Leondra Henderson; Gerard Booker

The Kissimmee carjacking murders occurred on November 29, 1992, when a group of four youths, aged 17 to 22, carjacked a group of three men and a woman on the city outskirts of St. Cloud, Florida, holding them hostage at gunpoint in the victims' truck and drove it to Kissimmee. After they reached a remote field, the four carjackers forced the three male victims to take off their clothes and lie face down before they shot them in their heads. Two of the male victims, Anthony Clifton and Anthony Faiella, died of fatal gunshot wounds while the third, Michael Rentas, survived his injury. The sole female victim, Tammy George, witnessed the shooting and was not shot by the carjackers.

The four perpetrators were arrested and prosecuted in both Florida state court and federal court. The three adult defendants – Jermaine Foster (born November 3, 1973), Gerard Booker (born October 12, 1970) and Alf Catholic (born July 13, 1971) – were convicted in federal court and sentenced to life without parole plus 25 years for armed carjacking resulting in death. The juvenile offender, Leondra Henderson (born July 8, 1975), received a 40-year federal sentence after pleading guilty and agreeing to testify against his co-defendants. This was the United States's first federal prosecution for carjacking under the Federal Anti-Car Theft Act of 1992, which had taken effect only one month before the crime.

In state court, the four perpetrators were put on trial for first-degree murder. Of all the four, Foster was sentenced to death and he is currently awaiting execution on Florida's death row as of 2026, while Henderson, Booker and Catholic were sentenced to life in prison. Henderson was released in 2020, while Catholic and Booker are serving their life sentences in different state prisons.

== Murders ==
On November 29, 1992, in St. Cloud, Florida, a group of three men and a woman were carjacked by four young men, who forcibly took the group to Kissimmee, Florida, where two of the victims were shot to death.

On the night of November 28, 1992, the four perpetrators – 17-year-old Leondra Lamont Henderson, 22-year-old Gerard Ron Booker, 21-year-old Alf Catholic and 19-year-old Jermaine Alexander Foster – robbed and carjacked three drug dealers at gunpoint in Auburndale, Florida, and stole some money, jewelry, cocaine and the trio's red Ford pickup truck in Polk County, Florida, and they drove the vehicle to Kissimmee in Osceola County, Florida. According to sources, Booker had recruited the other three youths to commit robbery together in order to recoup his recent gambling losses.

By the time the four reached Kissimmee, the truck began to have mechanical problems. They decided to rob a drug dealer, but they changed their plan and chose to steal another truck because they could not find their intended target. Subsequently, the four youths targeted a group of three men and a woman who were drinking at a nightclub in St. Cloud, and one of the men, 17-year-old Anthony Faiella, drove a Nissan Pathfinder truck.

Later, Faiella and his three friends – 20-year-old Anthony Clifton, Clifton's 25-year-old girlfriend Tammy George, and 20-year-old Michael Rentas – left the nightclub in the early morning hours of November 29, 1992, and they drove away in Faiella's truck, with the four men tailing behind them in the stolen truck. After tailing them for some distance, the four men rammed the stolen truck into the Nissan truck, and they came out to confront the four victims at gunpoint, forcing them to drive on, until they stopped at a remote field in Kissimmee.

After reaching the remote field, the four victims were forced out of the truck and taken to the field by their captors. The three male victims were ordered to strip themselves and lie on the ground with their hands on their heads. Afterwards, one of the four culprits, Foster, fired his gun at all the three male hostages in the back of their heads. Both Faiella and Clifton died due to their wounds, while Rentas survived the shooting, because the bullet hit him in his hand and he managed to stay alive by playing dead. George, who was forced to watch the shooting, was left unharmed by the attackers, who all left the scene after the murders. It was further reported that one of the four culprits confessed that they spared George's life because she was African-American just like the four killers, while the three male victims were either white or Hispanic, which initially led to the belief that the shootings were racially-motivated, before it was ultimately concluded that the underlying motive was robbery.

== Federal prosecution ==
=== Federal charges and indictment ===
On December 1, 1992, the police managed to arrest three of the four suspects: Jermaine Foster, Gerard Booker and Alf Catholic, who all confessed to the crime. A day later, Henderson was the fourth and final suspect arrested for the carjacking case.

After their arrests, the four youths were charged in both the federal and state courts with the murders and carjacking, and the case was reviewed by both state and federal officials to determine whether to first prosecute the four in federal courts or state courts. On December 17, 1992, a federal judge ruled that Henderson would be tried as an adult by the federal courts.

On December 18, 1992, a federal grand jury indicted all four suspects in the case. Henderson was indicted on one count of conspiracy to commit carjacking, one count of carjacking, and one count of using a firearm during a violent crime. The other three suspects were each indicted on one count of conspiracy to commit carjacking, two counts of carjacking, and two counts of using a firearm during a violent. It was also decided that the federal authorities would prosecute the four suspects before they would be put on trial in the state courts.

The case was the first prosecution under a federal carjacking statute providing enhanced penalties for offenses resulting in murder. Under the law, using a firearm during a fatal carjacking was punishable by life imprisonment without the possibility of parole. U.S. Attorney Robert W. Genzman described the case as "one of the most heinous cases of armed carjacking."

=== Plea deal of Henderson ===
On January 25, 1993, one of the suspects, Leondra Henderson, agreed to plead guilty to federal carjacking charges in exchange for his testimony against his three accomplices in their upcoming federal trial. This plea agreement took the death penalty off the table for Henderson in his upcoming state murder trial. According to federal prosecutors, they made the plea bargain because Henderson played the smallest role out of the four and he did not shoot any of the victims. Henderson formally entered his plea on February 2, 1993, in a federal trial court.

On May 22, 1993, Henderson was sentenced to 40 years in federal prison for armed carjacking and conspiracy to commit carjacking. Judge Patricia C. Fawsett overrode the prosecution's recommended sentence of 405 months, and she stated that while Henderson's testimony essentially assisted the prosecution's case against his accomplices, it did not diminish his criminal responsibility for the carjacking and murders. Chronologically, Henderson was the last perpetrator to be sentenced.

In July 1995, during a re-sentencing hearing, Henderson's 40-year sentence was reduced to 33 years in federal prison by U.S. District Judge Patricia Fawsett, after Prosecutor Randy Gold and Henderson's lawyer, Assistant Federal Public Defender Joel Remland, sought the reduction on the basis that Henderson substantively assisted the federal prosecution to testify against his co-defendants and provided crucial information to Seminole County authorities to solve a drug-related homicide.

=== Trial of Booker, Catholic and Foster ===
The remaining three suspects – Catholic, Booker and Foster – were scheduled to stand trial for conspiracy, armed carjacking, and weapons charges on February 16, 1993.

On February 25, 1993, a jury found the trio guilty of conspiracy, armed carjacking, and weapons offenses. Following their conviction, they faced the maximum sentence of life in prison without parole under the Federal Anti-Car Theft Act of 1992. At that time, the offense of carjacking did not carry the death penalty under federal law, up until 1994, when the statute was amended to prescribe capital punishment as the maximum penalty for carjacking in federal jurisdictions.

On April 26, 1993, U.S. District Judge Patricia Fawsett sentenced the three defendants to life without parole, plus 25 years' imprisonment. The judge cited that the killings were "cold-blooded and pitiless" to the extent that only the maximum penalty should be meted out for the trio.

== State prosecution ==
=== State murder charges ===
After their trial for the federal carjacking charges, the four youths were slated to stand trial in state court for multiple criminal counts, including murder, and they faced the possibility of a death sentence under Florida state law if found guilty.

On March 4, 1993, an Osceola County grand jury indicted the four youths for two counts of first-degree murder, one count of attempted murder, and four counts of kidnapping. State prosecutors intended to seek the death penalty against three of the four men: Foster, Catholic and Booker. Due to the plea bargain he made with federal authorities, the state agreed to not pursue the death penalty for Henderson.

In August 1993, the trial venue for Foster, Catholic and Booker was expected to be changed to another county from Kissimmee. That month, the trial was scheduled to take place in Orlando, Florida.

=== Henderson's conviction ===
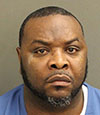
Leondra Lamont Henderson

On November 9, 1993, Henderson pleaded guilty to two counts of first-degree murder, and due to his plea of guilty, he would be sentenced to life in prison with the possibility of parole after 25 years since the death penalty was no longer an option in his case. Henderson faced an additional 15 years in prison for attempted murder. As a condition of his plea, the state prison sentence was set to run concurrently with the federal prison term once it was imposed.

On March 21, 1994, Henderson was sentenced to two life sentences plus 15 years for the charges of first-degree murder and attempted murder.

After his sentencing, Henderson was imprisoned at a state prison in Florida starting from April 26, 1994, and 26 years later, he was paroled and released on December 16, 2020.

=== Conviction of Booker ===
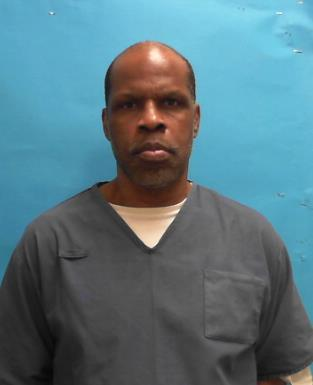
Gerard Ron Booker

Originally, the remaining three suspects – Booker, Foster and Catholic – were to stand trial together in state court. On January 28, 1994, before his trial could begin, Booker pleaded guilty to first-degree murder and kidnapping charges and avoided facing a trial by jury. According to the defense, Booker decided to plead guilty to evade the death penalty, and the prosecution had not agreed to the defense's request to waive the death penalty and secure a plea bargain. Regardless, the plea by Booker did not rule out the death penalty as an option in his upcoming sentencing.

On October 13, 1994, Circuit Judge Gary L. Formet Sr. sentenced Booker to life imprisonment. He agreed that Booker was less culpable than his accomplices and accepted that Booker took responsibility for his actions, and he also considered Booker's troubled upbringing. Booker was the last of the four to be sentenced by the state courts for the carjacking case.

As of 2026, Booker remains incarcerated at the Okeechobee Correctional Institution in Florida.

=== Trial of Foster and Catholic ===
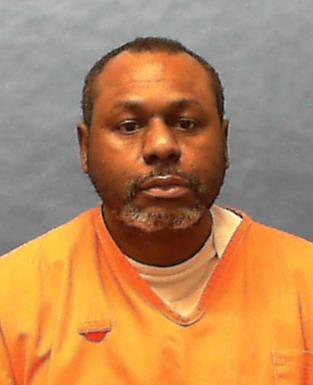
Jermaine Foster

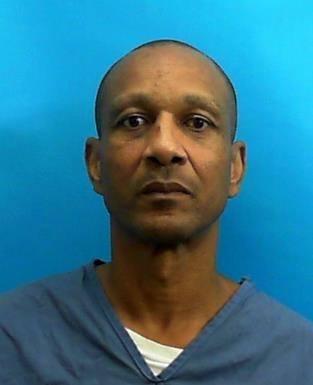
Alf Catholic

After Booker pleaded guilty, Catholic and Foster became the last two suspects put on trial for the murders of Anthony Faiella and Anthony Clifton, plus the carjacking case. Jury selection for the duo's murder trial took place in February 1994.

On February 9, 1994, the jury found Foster and Catholic guilty of two counts of first-degree murder, one count of attempted first-degree murder and four counts of kidnapping. Catholic was also found guilty of using a firearm to commit a crime.

On March 25, 1994, the 12-member jury unanimously recommended to sentence Foster to death, while they voted for Catholic to receive life imprisonment. Circuit Court Judge Gary L. Formet Sr. was scheduled to sentence both men the following month.

On July 25, 1994, Foster was formally sentenced to death by the electric chair, while Catholic was sentenced to life in prison.

As of 2026, Foster is incarcerated on death row at the Union Correctional Institution, while Catholic is imprisoned at the Holmes Correctional Institution.

== Appeals of Jermaine Foster ==
On July 18, 1996, the Florida Supreme Court rejected Foster's direct appeal against his death sentence.

On March 23, 2006, Foster's second appeal was turned down by the Florida Supreme Court.

In August 2017, Foster's re-sentencing case was transferred to the Ocala County State Attorney Brad King by the order of Governor Rick Scott, after Orange-Osceola State Attorney Aramis Ayala publicly announced her opposition to the death penalty. Foster's crime took place in Osceola County and his trial was carried out in Orange County, and due to the changes to the death penalty laws in 2016, Foster's case was up for review for possible re-sentencing by the Orange County courts, before Ayala's opposition stance towards capital punishment led to the transfer of Foster's case to another county for review.

On December 28, 2018, the Florida Supreme Court dismissed Foster's re-sentencing plea, pointing out that the jury had unanimously voted for the death penalty back in his original trial, and Foster himself had already exhausted his mandatory appeals prior to June 24, 2002, the date of a landmark U.S. Supreme Court ruling that validated death sentences imposed by juries rather than judges, and hence he was not entitled to re-sentencing. On that day, James Aren Duckett, an ex-policeman who was on death row for the 1987 rape-murder of a young girl, also lost his appeal for re-sentencing. Duckett was executed by lethal injection on July 28, 2026.

On August 29, 2024, Foster's post-conviction appeal was dismissed by the Florida Supreme Court. On July 16, 2026, the Florida Supreme Court denied Foster's application for a new trial and upheld his conviction and sentence.

== See also ==
- Capital punishment in Florida
- List of death row inmates in the United States § Florida
