= Waldo Grant =

American serial killer (1946–2023)

- Grant in 1977
- Born: November 3, 1946; Bulloch County, Georgia, U.S
- Died: June 6, 2023 (aged 76); Albany Medical Center, Albany, New York, U.S.
- Conviction: Second degree murder (4 counts)
- Penalty: Life imprisonment

Details
- Victims: 4+
- Span of crimes: 1973–1976
- Country: United States
- State: New York
- Date apprehended: January 10, 1977

Waldo Grant (November 3, 1946 – June 6, 2023) was an American serial killer who murdered four young men in New York City between September 1973 and December 1976. In January 1977, he confessed to the killings after being questioned by city police. He was sentenced to life in prison the following year and died in 2023.

== Personal life ==
Waldo Grant was born in Bulloch County, Georgia, on November 3, 1946, as one of Jerome Grant and Mattie Rucker Grant's fifteen children. He was raised in Statesboro, and when he turned 16, he became a self-ordained minister for a black gospel church. In 1971, he moved north to escape a failed marriage, eventually settling into an apartment on Manhattan's Upper West Side. Although his neighbors described him as a quiet loner, he was somewhat-well known throughout Upper West Side's gay community.

== Murders ==
- Phillip Mitchell – On September 13, 1973, Grant murdered 20-year-old Phillip Mitchell by hitting him over the head with a lead pipe. He then dragged Mitchell's body to the roof of 203 West 91st Street. In an attempt to make the murder look like an accident, he threw Mitchell's corpse off the roof and into a rear yard. Grant stated he killed Phillip Mitchell because he demanded money after sex and started rummaging through Grant's closet. However, this claim has not been substantiated. Grant and other residents of the apartment building were questioned about the murder, but no arrests were made.
- George Muniz – Almost two years later, the body of 23-year-old George Muniz was found in a metal trash can in front of a house at 210 West 91st Street, a half of a block away from Grant's apartment, where the murder occurred. He had been stabbed multiple times in the throat and back.
- Harold Phillips – On October 3, 1976, 22-year-old Harold Phillips was beaten to death with a hammer in his own apartment at 27 East 124th Street.
- Harry Carillo – On December 29, 1976, the dismembered body of 16-year-old Harry Carillo was discovered by children playing on a path in Central Park. Grant, who knew the victim for about six months, had cut his naked body into three pieces with a saw and put his remains into three green garbage bags. He then transported Carillo's remains to Central Park using a shopping cart.

== Arrest and imprisonment ==
Since he was the last person to be seen with Harry Carillo, Grant soon became a suspect in his murder. Police questioned him multiple times over the span of two weeks. On January 10, 1977, police brought Grant back for questioning, presenting him with circumstantial evidence which connected him to Carillo's murder. After being questioned for five hours, Grant confessed to Carillo's murder, stating "Harry is very attractive to me and I desire him very much and that was the only way I could get him." A short time later, he confessed to the three other murders, proclaiming that he had an "uncontrollable urge to kill." On June 30, 1978, he was found guilty of the four murders and sentenced to four concurrent life sentences.

According to information supplied via the NYSDOCCS, Grant died at the Albany Medical Center in Albany, New York on June 6, 2023. He was 76.

== See also ==
- Crime in New York City
- List of serial killers in the United States
- List of people sentenced to more than one life imprisonment
