= Mario Normore =

American serial killer (born 1991)

- Born: Mario James Jerrell Normore; April 23, 1991 (age 35); Oklahoma City, Oklahoma, U.S.
- Other names: "Chief"; Butler J. Moe
- Convictions: First degree murder x4 Robbery x12 Carrying weapon, drugs or alcohol in jail x5 Rioting x2 Assault & battery on officer x2 Assault & battery with weapon x2 Malicious injury Assault & battery on juvenile affairs employee
- Penalty: 8 years (2010); Life imprisonment without the possibility of parole x4 (2023)

Details
- Victims: 4
- Span of crimes: July 10 – October 3, 2017
- Country: United States
- State: Oklahoma
- Date apprehended: October 27, 2017

Mario James Jerrell Normore (born April 23, 1991) is an American serial killer and bank robber who committed four murders from July to October 2017 around Oklahoma City, Oklahoma, shortly after being released from prison for a robbery conviction. He pleaded guilty to the crimes in 2023, and was subsequently sentenced to four life terms without parole.

== Early life and convictions ==
Little is known about Normore's early life. Born on April 23, 1991, in Oklahoma City, Oklahoma, he started committing crimes in 2009 and was a member of the Rollin' 20 Crips, a branch of the Crips. In 2010, he was convicted of robbery and given 8 years imprisonment, but released from prison in May 2017. Shortly after said release, he found a job at a recycling plant, where he became acquainted with 27-year-old Bashar Burks.

== Murders ==
On July 10, Normore asked Burks to give him a ride home, to which the latter agreed. Burks and his girlfriend, 30-year-old Ashley Easton, then picked him up, but on the way, Normore and Burks got into some sort of argument. Supposedly believing that Burks was reaching for a firearm, Normore pulled out a gun and shot him in the head, before proceeding to shoot the terrified Easton as well. The car was later found engulfed in flames, with only Burks' body inside. Police initially believed that he had been the victim of a car crash, but after locating his girlfriend's body in a ditch on the following day, it was determined that both were the victims of a homicide.

Normore then enlisted the help of his cousin, Brandon Lee Butler, to help him commit robberies on various banks around Oklahoma City, with Butler acting as the getaway driver. On August 18, the pair went to the home of 20-year-old Searra Howe, an acquaintance of Normore, so they could steal her car. According to Butler, they kidnapped Howe, tied her up and drove to a forest near Jones, where Normore planned to shoot her. Unwilling to kill the woman, Butler offered to "shoot" her, but instead planned to untie Howe and tell her to either run away or play dead as he shot in the air. However, Normore became impatient, took the gun and shot her in the head. Howe was reported missing a day later, but her remains were found only two months later on November 7.

On October 3, Normore went to the apartment of 57-year-old James Steven Knowles, a maintenance man from whom he had rented an apartment. He shot and killed Knowles, then disposed of his body in an unknown location, as it has not been located to this day. Normore would later give conflicting reasons for this murder, telling Butler that he killed Knowles because he was a snitch, while another acquaintance claimed it was because the victim had refused to give him back $20 he owed.

In the final months of the year, Normore reportedly attempted to kill Butler, but failed to do so as his weapon had malfunctioned and refused to fire.

== Arrest, trial, and guilty plea ==
On October 27, Normore was arrested after he was connected to ten robberies committed around the Oklahoma City area, but was not immediately linked to the murders. Almost a year later, authorities linked him to the crimes and charged him with four counts of murder. An initial court hearing was scheduled for December 2017, but was delayed until January 2018. At one such hearing in 2019, Butler - who had accepted to testify as a witness in exchange for immunity from prosecution - said that Howe had begged for her life, but Normore shot her anyway.

On September 23, 2018, Normore and two other inmates at the Oklahoma County Detention Center broke out of their cells, attacking the jail guards and breaking security equipment during a riot. Accounts claimed that Normore tied a shank to his hand, while the other two armed themselves with broom handles. On March 11, 2022, Normore was charged with assault and battery after another attempted jailbreak incident. On this occasion, he had asked one of the guards to give him a tablet, but once the guard opened the bean hole on the door, Normore managed to kick the door open and threaten the guard for his keys. When the guard refused, Normore proceeded to beat him for two minutes before attempting to open the cell door of another inmate. He was prevented from doing so by other security guards who forced him to flee back to his cell, whereupon they locked him in again.

On March 21, 2023, in a bid to avoid getting the death penalty, Normore pleaded guilty to all four counts of murder and the ten robbery counts, citing the testimony of the victims' family members as his decision to spare them further grief. As a result, he was automatically sentenced to four consecutive life terms without the chance of parole. While family members of the victims were unsure about why the new District Attorney Vicki Behenna was reluctant to pursue the death penalty in this case, they were nonetheless relieved that the ordeal was finally over.

== See also ==
- List of serial killers in the United States
- List of people sentenced to more than one life imprisonment
