= Joe Cool murders =

American mass murderer

In September 2007, Kirby Logan Archer and Guillermo Zarabozo were found adrift in a lifeboat off Miami under suspicious circumstances. They were later found to have hijacked the fishing charter vessel Joe Cool, and murdered the vessel's crew.

== Found adrift ==
On September 22, 2007, Archer (born October 24, 1971) and Guillermo Zarabozo chartered the Joe Cool, a 47-foot Miami-based fishing charter, asking to be transported to Bimini. After the vessel failed to return to Miami on schedule, a Coast Guard rescue operation was initiated, and the Joe Cool was eventually found adrift as a deserted ghost ship. Archer and Zarabozo were found nearby in the vessel's lifeboat, with their luggage—with no sign of the vessel's crew: Jake Branam, Kelley Branam, Scott Gamble, and Samuel Kairy.

Archer's account said that the boat was hijacked and that the hijackers let him and Zarabozo go. Zarabozo initially gave a similar account (though he later changed his story, claiming that he was never aboard the Joe Cool and was charged with making a false statement to law enforcement officials as a result). However, investigators suspected that Archer had chartered the vessel in order to flee an Arkansas arrest warrant and seek asylum in Cuba, Zarabozo's native country. Archer had previously been stationed at Guantanamo Bay Naval Base while serving as a military police investigator in the United States Army.

== Arkansas warrant ==
Archer had previously worked as the customer service manager at an Arkansas Walmart, where he was accused of stealing $92,000. Before Arkansas law enforcement officials could arrest him for the alleged theft, Archer fled the state, resulting in the issuance of a fugitive warrant for his arrest. Archer, who was also facing allegations of sexual abuse against young boys in Arkansas (including his own children), made his way to Miami, where he hired the charter boat, paying cash to cover the $4,000 charge for the two-hour trip.

== Arrest, guilty plea and sentence ==
Archer and Zarabozo were formally charged with the murders of the four crew members during the hijacking of the Joe Cool charter boat on October 10, 2007. Prosecutors alleged that Archer hijacked the boat and headed for Cuba to escape the intensifying child molestation and theft investigations in Arkansas. In July 2008, Archer pleaded guilty to first-degree murder, robbery, kidnapping, and hijacking. By pleading guilty, Archer avoided a possible death sentence. On October 14, 2008, Archer was sentenced to five consecutive life terms in prison.

Archer's co-defendant, Guillermo Zarabozo, was tried on the same charges of murder, robbery, kidnapping, hijacking, and weapons charges and was initially found guilty of firearms violations. However, the jury deadlocked on the piracy and murder counts, with some jury members believing Zarabozo's claims that the hijacking and murders had been planned and initiated by Archer without Zarabozo's knowledge. At his retrial, Zarabozo was found guilty on four murder charges on February 19, 2009. On May 7, he was given five life sentences plus 85 years.

Archer is serving his sentence at FCI Jesup.
