= Richard Timmons =

American murderer (born 1965)

Richard Timmons (born 1965) is an American murderer. He brutally murdered his wife and seven-year-old son, by decapitating them with an ax, and his thirteen-year-old stepson by stabbing him to death on June 8, 1997, at his apartment in Queens, New York. In March 2004, after being handed three life sentences, Timmons unsuccessfully sued the city of New York claiming police brutality on the night he was arrested. He also has the notoriety of making Bernard Goldberg's list of 100 People Who Are Screwing Up America.

== Life ==
=== Incident ===
On the night of June 8, 1997, Timmons consumed a large amount of alcohol, crack cocaine, PCP, heroin and other substances before beginning his spree. He first attacked his wife, Annita Stewart, in the bedroom, slashing her head off and leaving it propped on a pillow. He then proceeded to his son Aaron, whose plight was caught on a 911 tape. Aaron is heard crying, "Daddy, please" before Timmons cut his head off. Finally, Timmons attacked his stepson Sharonne and stabbed him to death.

After the attack, Timmons slit his wrists and wrote, "The Lost Boys is your man" on the wall, with his blood. He initially claimed that the rapper Mr. Cheeks (of The Lost Boyz) was to blame for the murders.

He was convicted of first degree murder and sentenced to life without parole. His conviction was affirmed by the New York State Supreme Court, Appellate Division, Second Department. Timmons is incarcerated in Auburn Correctional Facility.

=== Police brutality claim ===
Serving as his own attorney, he lost his civil case against the police, as there was apparently no support for his claim. For example, he admitted that his memory of that night was 'hazy' (due in no small part to the alcohol, PCP, heroin, and possibly other substances that were in his system that night). Moreover, no one at the hospital where one of the beatings purportedly took place had heard anything sounding like someone being beaten that night. Evidence also pointed to the fact that police, far from beating him, actually took Timmons to Burger King, when he complained of being hungry the night they arrested him for the murders.
