= Juri Sulimov =

Convicted Ukrainian-born Estonian serial killer

- Born: March 13, 1967 (age 59); Ukrainian SSR
- Convictions: Murder x3 Theft x1
- Penalty: 10 years imprisonment (first murder, attempted murder); 15 years imprisonment (second murder); Death; commuted to life imprisonment (last murder)

Details
- Victims: 3
- Span of crimes: 1983–1994
- Country: Soviet Union, later Estonia
- States: Harju, Ida-Viru
- Date apprehended: June 9, 1994

Juri Sulimov (born March 13, 1967) is a Soviet serial killer who killed three people, two of them prisoners, between 1983 and 1994. Sentenced to death for his crimes, his sentence would later be automatically commuted to life imprisonment when the death penalty was abolished in the country.

== Early life ==
Juri Sulimov was born on March 13, 1967, in the Ukrainian SSR, but the family moved to Kohtla-Järve when he was 7 years old.

Described as an irritable, violent criminal child by his mother, Sulimov's first recorded offence occurred on May 19, 1983, when the 16-year-old was arrested for theft. Although found guilty, his sentencing was delayed for two years and he was allowed to roam free. Four months later, on August 13, Sulimov was out drinking with a friend when the pair noticed a disabled elderly berry picket waiting at a bus stop. Seemingly disgusted by his physical deformities, the pair attacked the old man, with Sulimov kicking and beating him, while his accomplice used a hammer to strike the man on the head. After the victim stopped showing signs of life, both of them calmly returned home. To their shock, however, the elderly man was brought to the hospital and survived his injuries after several complex surgeries, managing to identify his assailants afterwards. Not long after, Sulimov was taken into custody, and jailed at a remand center until he could stand trial.

== Violent crimes ==
=== Prison murders, incarceration ===
On November 11, Sulimov got into a quarrel with his cellmate, as the latter refused to help clean up the dirty cell. Later in the evening, while the man slept, Sulimov pressed his boots against his head and neck, and used some rope to strangle the man. The rope broke, and so, Sulimov dragged the man from the top bunk down to the floor, grabbed a string of linen and successfully choked the man to death. For this, and the attempted murder he was originally jailed for, Sulimov received a 10-year sentence on April 4, 1984, by the Tallinn District Court. After spending two years in the Rummu Prison, he was transferred to a mental asylum in 1986. On February 16, Sulimov and two other inmates attacked another prisoner in the smoking area, with Juri using a sharpened object to inflict 10 wounds to the man's vital organs, killing him.

Sulimov was found guilty of this killing as well, and was given an additional 15 years imprisonment. Shortly after the verdict was announced, he was sent to a corrective labor colony in the Lithuanian SSR. However, on March 3, 1987, the Vilnius District Court ordered that he be psychiatrically examined, with the prison psychologists ruling that Sulimov was mentally unstable. Shortly after, he was transferred to a closed psychiatric hospital, where he remained until April 29, 1992, when he was taken to the Tallinn Psychoneurology Hospital for further treatment. At a June 1, 1993, court hearing, Sulimov was allowed to spend time in a psychiatric facility with a less strict regime, after examinations proved that he was sane, but suffered from an intellectual disability and possible psychopathic personality, which resulted in poor impulse control. Despite these warnings, Sulimov was sent to a general psychiatric hospital in Ahtme on June 13, 1993, and was allowed to temporarily leave on May 11, 1994.

=== Release, new crimes and final murder ===
On the day of his release, Sulimov got drunk and threatened a passer-by, stealing a bag with loot amounting to 80 kroons. A week later, he was fined 100 kroons for petty hooliganism. In June, he stole five cartridges and ammonite, which he fashioned into two explosive devices and a pistol, but was caught and returned to the psychiatric hospital. On June 14, he was officially released from the Ahtme Psychiatric Hospital, after experts concluded that he had been officially "cured" and capable of understanding the gravity of his actions, and was only to be monitored by a ward psychiatrist in isolated periods.

After his release, Sulimov found a job in the engineering industry, where he aided in developing explosive devices, and even found himself a girlfriend, a fellow drunkard like himself. On July 9, 1994, Sulimov and his girlfriend were invited to a house party by an acquaintance whose wife and children were not at their home in Kohtla-Järve. While in an intoxicated state, the man told his guests to turn down the TV so he could sleep. Irritated by this remark, Sulimov went to the bedroom where the man was sleeping and proceeded to suffocate him with a pillow. His girlfriend stumbled into the room, and after realizing that the man was dying, she unsuccessfully tried to resuscitate him. Understanding that he had killed him, Sulimov poured cologne on the body and lit it on fire with some matches. While the room was burning down, the pair stole several items from the household, amounting to 410 kroons. Not long after the crime scene was discovered, Sulimov was quickly identified as the perpetrator and promptly arrested.

== Sentencing and imprisonment ==
Sulimov was brought to trial, and two years after his initial arrest, he was found guilty on all counts and sentenced to death, the same day as double murderer Aleksandr Roženkov. Sulimov appealed his sentence to the Supreme Court of Estonia, but his appeal was shot down in June of that year. His case was discussed in the press in relation to the application of the death penalty in the country.

When the death penalty punishment was abolished in the country in 1998, Sulimov's sentence was automatically converted to a life sentence. As of 2021, he is still alive and remains one of the oldest serving prisoners in Estonia.

== See also ==
- List of serial killers by country
