= Holmes Correctional Institution =

State prison for men in Bonifay, Holmes County, Florida

Coordinates: 30°45′31″N 85°40′12″W

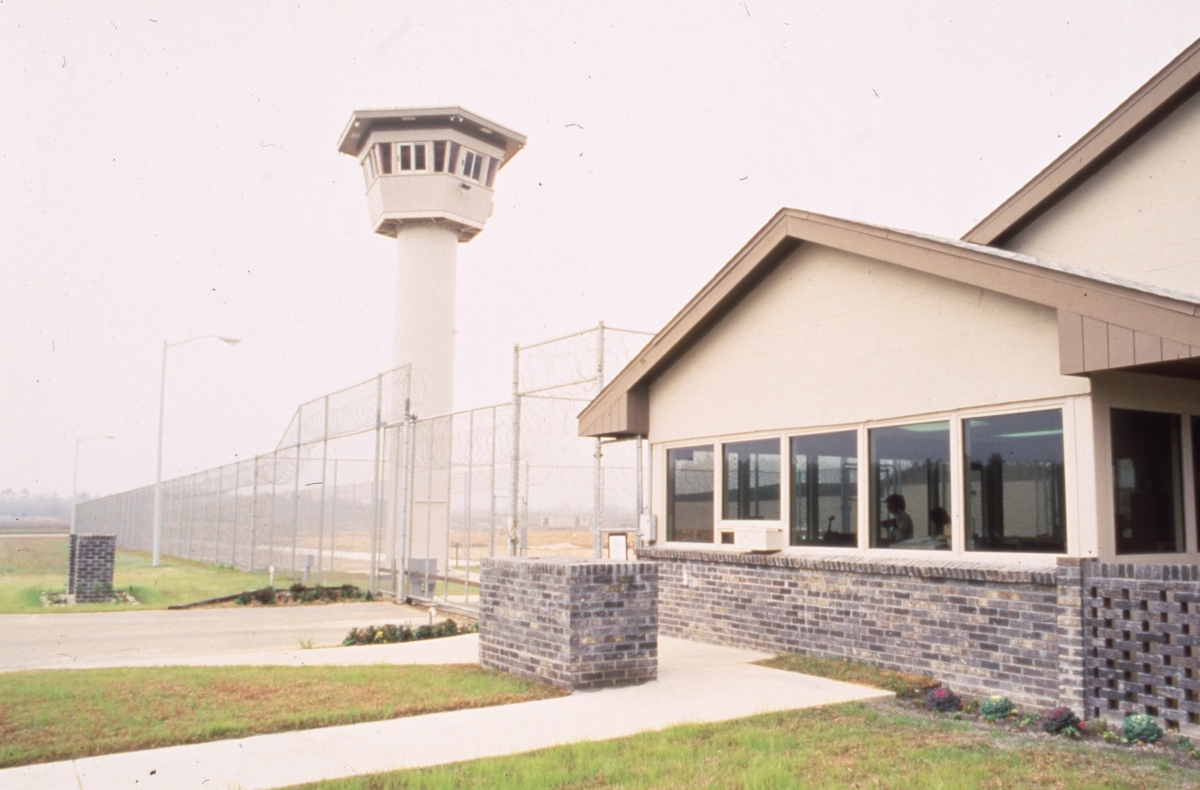
- Close-up view showing entrance, c. 1990
- Interactive map of Holmes Correctional Institution
- Location: 3142 Thomas Drive Bonifay, Florida
- Status: Operational
- Security class: Minimum, medium, and close
- Capacity: 1,650 = 1,322 (main unit) + 328 (satellite unit)
- Population: 1,379 = 1,245 (main unit) + 129 (satellite unit) (December 2023)
- Opened: 1988
- Managed by: Florida Department of Corrections
- Warden: Lorie Lykins
- Website: https://www.fdc.myflorida.com/institutions/institutions-list/107

The Holmes Correctional Institution (HOLCI) is a state prison for men located in Bonifay, Holmes County, Florida, owned and operated by the Florida Department of Corrections. With a mix of security levels including minimum, medium, and close, this facility was opened in 1988 and has a maximum capacity of 1,650 prisoners.

Holmes correctional officer Col. Greg Malloy was killed in an exchange of gunfire in February 2011 as he assisted in the manhunt for local killer Wade Williams.

== Notable Inmates ==
- Sky Bouche, sentenced to 30 years for the Forest High School shooting that injured only one student by shooting through the door.
