= Murder of Madeline Soto =

2024 homicide in Florida, United States

- Location: Kissimmee, Florida
- Date: February 26, 2024
- Victim: Madeline Soto
- Perpetrator: Stephan Michael Sterns
- Charges: First-degree murder; Sexual battery; Possession of child sexual abuse materials; Lewd or lascivious molestation

Madeline Soto, a 13-year-old girl from Kissimmee, Florida, was reported as missing on February 26, 2024, and found dead on March 1, 2024. Her mother's boyfriend, Stephan Michael Sterns (born April 25, 1986), was charged with first-degree murder. In July 2025, Sterns pled no contest to his charges and was sentenced to life imprisonment without parole.

== Disappearance ==
Soto disappeared on February 26, 2024. Staff of her middle school stated that she did not arrive that day. On February 27, the Orange County Sheriff's Office requested the public assist by providing any information they had on her whereabouts.

== Investigation ==
A search for Soto was undertaken by the Orange County Sheriff's Office on February 28. Soto's body was found in a wooded area on March 1. The Kissimmee Police Department took over as it became a homicide investigation. The department released a report in August stating that Soto died of strangulation.

Authorities found video evidence of Sterns discarding items into a dumpster on February 26. Inside, they found Soto's backpack and school-issued laptop. On that same day, Sterns's phone was put through a factory reset, which Sterns claimed to be an accident.

Two days later on February 28, Stephan Michael Sterns gave consent for police to search his phone. The sheriff's office reported on February 29 that they had found pictures and videos of Sterns, who lived in Kissimmee at the time, molesting Soto, dating back to when she was only eight years old, on his phone and Google Drive. Sterns requested that the evidence be thrown out as it had not been acquired with a search warrant.

Sterns was indicted by a grand jury for murder in April 2024.

On June 10, the Ninth Judicial Circuit Attorney's office stated that it would seek the death penalty. Sterns's attorney cited the Fifth, Sixth, Eighth, and Fourteenth Amendments to argue that the death penalty was a form of cruel and unusual punishment.

On July 21, 2025, Sterns pleaded no contest to murder, and guilty on all 60 other sex crime charges. Later that afternoon, Sterns was sentenced to 21 concurrent life sentences in state prison with no possibility of parole.

== Legacy ==
A memorial bench was proposed to be had in a park in St. Cloud to commemorate Soto, with a t-shirt drive being organized to fund the memorial.
