= Rémy Roy =

French serial killer

- Born: 1958 (age 67–68); France
- Other name: "The Minitel Killer"
- Conviction: Murder
- Penalty: Life imprisonment plus 18 years preventative detention

Details
- Victims: 3
- Span of crimes: 1990–1991
- Country: France
- State: Île-de-France
- Date apprehended: 28 November 1991

Rémy Roy (born 1958), known as The Minitel Killer (French: Le Tueur du Minitel), is a French serial killer who killed three gay men between 1990 and 1991. His motive was a self-admitted hatred towards homosexuals. He earned his nickname because he messaged prospective victims using a "pink Minitel" (French: Minitel rose, a term referring to the use of the Minitel, a telephone-based French Videotex, for erotic purposes) and offering to engage in BDSM with victims to lure them.

== Biography ==
Rémy Roy was born in an indeterminate region of France in 1958. He grew up pampered by his parents and studied at a religious school, the Brothers of Saint-Vincent de Paul, but was considered a mediocre student. After graduating, he went to a sailing school and eventually became a skipper, with his profession allowing him to meet people such as Florence Arthaud, Philippe Poupon and Olivier de Kersauson, and even worked with a close companion of Nicolas Hulot. During this time, he also met his future wife, the owner of a local bookstore, whom he later married and moved in with at a house in Villejuif, where they soon had two children together.

According to Roy's wife, he was a kind, generous father who always looked after his family and even volunteered at her bookstore. This changed in 1988, when his wife hired a friend to help out, leaving Roy with nothing to do. Now left with much free time, he decided to open a promotional video company based in his home, but this failed to generate any interest. Due to the failure of his business, Roy became depressed and started spending most of his time in bed eating, causing him to become overweight, weighing 120. Around this time, he started to frequently use Minitel, up to several hours each day.

== Murders and investigation ==
On the afternoon of 11 October 1990, Roy made an appointment with 46-year-old insurance agent Paul Bernard to meet up at a marina in Draveil, near the edge of the Seine. Bernard lived in Issy-les-Moulineaux with his widowed, retired mother and frequently used his Minitel to look for hook-ups to satiate his masochistic tendencies. After allowing Roy to gag him with a scarf, and tie his hands behind his back and his testicles with a string, he was left to suffocate before Roy crushed his head with a large stone. Bernard's naked body was found the following morning by a fisherman, with a pair of pants covering his head. His car was found in a parking lot about a kilometre from the marina. An autopsy determined that he had been asphyxiated or strangled, as there were traces of a tie around his neck.

During the night of 19 to 20 October, Roy went to the house of 48-year-old Gilbert Duquesnoy, an astrologer who lived in Champigny-sur-Marne and practised under the name "Nathaniel the Magician". Like the previous victim, he used the Minitel to look to cruise for people who would indulge in his masochistic tendencies. The pair eventually went to Duquesnoy's office in Paris's 9th arrondissement, where they drank a few glasses of port wine before Roy covered his sex partner's head with a leather hood and tied his ankles and hands behind his back. Now left with nothing to defend himself, Roy proceeded to hit Duquesnoy at least seven times on the head with a hammer, which he then stole along with the glass of wine, his victim's diary and address books, and promptly left the apartment. For some time, Duquesnoy's dachshund followed him, but eventually returned to the apartment. Roy eventually threw the hammer into the Marne and later disposed of the remaining items at the Nogent-sur-Marne station. Approximately two days later, Alain, Duquesnoy's partner, asked some neighbours to go and check on him since he was not answering his phone calls. After entering the apartment, they found the man lying naked on his bed, an open briefcase with sex toys next to him, and the house ransacked.

On 17 November, at about 11 AM, Roy went to the home of 41-year-old Hugues Moreau, the manager of a walling company based in Paris. Soon after, Roy smashed Moreau's skull using a large metal tap before stealing his chequebooks, bank cards and a fax machine. Moreau's wife discovered his body about two hours later, with the man being naked, his limbs bound and a chain tied around his waist. A bag full of BDSM-related items was found next to the bed. While an investigation was going on concerning this murder, Roy bought an underwater camcorder using the money he had stolen from Moreau's apartment.

=== Attempted murder and identification ===
On 8 October 1991, Roy went to the house of 32-year-old Bruno Giraudon, a civil servant living in Villeneuve-Saint-Georges who was looking for a companion and possible lover on Minitel. After drinking and talking for some time, Roy told Giraudon that he was a photographer specializing in the sailing world, and claimed that he was adept at sadomasochistic practices. He then took out his bag and showed some of his equipment as an offer to try it out, but surprisingly, Giraudon refused. Upon hearing this, Roy hit him on the head with a lampstand, causing him to faint. Deciding to leave him for dead, Roy stole his chequebook and identity papers, leaving the accessories behind. Giraudon's friends later found him naked and covered in blood, in an apparent comatose state, and quickly drove him to the nearest hospital. He eventually recovered three days later, and gave a description of his assailant to authorities.

The following month, Roy went to a video store and bought a flatbed editor and a VCR, saying to the clerk that he had a camcorder for underwater filming and wanted an editor that was compatible with it. The price amounted to 14,000 francs, requiring that he provide an ID, for which Roy paid with Giraudon's money and used his identity to present himself. A few hours later, he makes another purchase in another video store using the exact same method, but this time, he was recorded on the store's surveillance cameras. Eventually, investigators managed to obtain the surveillance footage and supplied still images to several editors of newspapers specialised in sailing. This idea led the editor-in-chief of Neptune Yachting, Alain Coroller, to identify the man on the footage as Rémy Roy.

== Arrest, trial and imprisonment ==
On 28 November 1991, Roy was arrested at his home in Villejuif, with investigators finding Giraudon's chequebook and driver's licence in his parka. While incarcerated in Fresnes Prison, he confessed responsibility for the crimes and explained in great detail what had transpired, but denied being gay and claimed that he had killed each victim because he was a homophobe. When interviewed by psychiatrist Jean Martel and psychologist Caroline Legendre, Roy made several revelations about his life that attracted interest: he claimed that he suffered a lot from the absences of his father, who travelled a lot, and was frequently whipped with a leather strap by his mother. As for his homophobia, Roy claimed several incidents led him to develop a seething hatred towards gay men:

- when he was young, he was tied by the arm to a tree branch by some classmates, who then stripped him naked
- at age 13, he went to watch a movie in a theatre, but the man sitting next to him accidentally ejaculated on him while masturbating.
- at age 17, while working as an apprentice repairman at an electronics shop, he was asked by a group of friends to repay them their money, as they thought that he charged too much for his services. When he was unable to pay, they instead told him to expose himself to an elderly man in a gym, which Roy refused to do and instead ran away. Angered by his refusal, the men then tracked him down and collectively gang raped him.

The authorities investigated every single one of these claims, finding that none of them had actually happened and that these were simply sadomasochistic fantasies that Roy falsely presented as memories. He was soon charged with two counts of murder (Bernard and Duquesnoy), one count of manslaughter (Moreau) and the attempted murder of Giraudon. On 26 June 1996, Roy's trial began at the cour d'assises in Créteil. After two days of deliberations, he was found guilty on all counts and sentenced to a life term with 18 years of preventative detention.

== List of known victims ==
| Date | | Identity | Age | Profession | Place |
| Facts | Discovery | Identity | Age | Profession | Place |
|---|---|---|---|---|---|
| 11 October 1990 | 12 October 1990 | Paul Bernard | 46 | insurance agent | Draveil |
| night of 19–20 October 1990 | 22 October 1990 | Gilbert Duquesnoy | 48 | astrologer known as "mage Nathaniel" | Champigny-sur-Marne |
| 17 November 1990 | 17 November 1990 | Hugues Moreau | 41 | manager of a walling company | Paris 16th arrondissement |
| 8 October 1991 | 8 October 1991 | Bruno Giraudon | 32 | civil servant | Villeneuve-Saint-Georges |

== See also ==
- List of French serial killers

== TV documentary ==
- "Rémy Roy, The Minitel Killer" 18 March 2012 and 2 June 2013, in Faites entrer l'accusé presented by Frédérique Lantieri on France 2.

== Radio shows ==
- "In the psyche of serial killers" on 21 April 2016 in Jacques Pradel's L'Heure du crime on RTL.
