= Wasim a-Sayed =

Palestinian murderer

- Born: 1988 (age 37–38); Hebron
- Status: In custody
- Motive: Islamic extremism
- Convictions: Murder (3 counts), attempted murder (2 counts)
- Penalty: Three life sentences plus 40 years

Details
- Victims: 3
- Date: 2019, 2022
- Location: Jerusalem
- Target: Jewish civilians
- Weapon: Knife

Wasim a-Sayed is a Palestinian serial killer who was responsible for three fatal stabbings in the city of Jerusalem in 2019 and 2022. He was captured by Israeli security forces in January 2022 after attempting to cross the Israeli West Bank barrier.

== Early life ==
Sayed was born in Hebron around 1988. He was radicalized to support the Islamic State (IS), a Salafi Jihadist terror group. Sayed was placed under administrative detention from 2015 to 2018 due to security concerns over his ties to IS. According to Channel 13, he later told investigators that "I decided that I will murder Jews, but I won’t tell anyone about it. It will only be between myself and my God. I decided that the Islamic State is my path. I looked for Jewish victims. I wanted to murder a man or a woman, but no children."

== Killings ==
=== Attempted stabbing of an Israeli teenager ===
On January 9, 2019, just three days after his release from jail, Sayed went into the Armon Hanatziv where he approached a 14-year-old Israeli girl in the stairwell of a building with a knife. Sayed lunged forward at the girl's throat. She was saved by her collar and began screaming for help, causing Sayed to flee the scene.

=== Murder of the Kaduri couple ===
The next day, Sayed returned to Armon Hanatziv. As he neared an apartment, he saw a 68-year-old man with a kippah named Yehuda Kaduri unloading his groceries from his car. Yehuda went inside the apartment to place his shopping bags and then walked out to get the remaining supplies. Sayed saw his chance and entered the building, where he walked into Kaduri's room. The knifeman went into the bedroom where he murdered Yehuda's wife Tamar.

As Yehuda walked to the bathroom after placing his groceries in the fridge, he confronted Sayed, who attacked him. Yehuda tried to fight back, but was overpowered and eventually was stabbed to death. Sayed slept inside the apartment for the night and left the following day. The Kaduri's bodies were found a day later, after relatives told police the couple were not answering their calls.

Israel's Police Service launched a major and controversial investigation into the murders. Police initially suspected Kaduri's son Nitai of murdering his parents for financial motives. Nitai and his wife were detained shortly after he was told that his parents had been killed, and then sent to an interrogation room. Nitai later accused the police of using "brutal" tactics and criticized them for a lack of transparency.

=== First arrest ===
On January 12, Sayed was arrested due to his support for IS. Sayed was sentenced to two years in prison and was released in 2022.

=== Arnona murders ===
On the night of March 20–21, 2022, Sayed entered an apartment in the Arnona neighbourhood of Jerusalem and murdered Moldovan foreign worker Ivan Tarnovski, who he thought was a Jew. Another Moldovan national was seriously injured. Police were alerted at around 1:30 am.

Sayed left the scene and was caught by security forces a few hours later as he tried to cross the Israeli West Bank barrier.

== Capture ==
After Sayed was arrested for illegally crossing the border with a knife, it was realized that he was responsible for killing Tarnovski. Further investigations and interrogations linked him to the murder of the Kaduris, to which he admitted his responsibility for.

Sayed said that he had learned how to commit murders via pro-IS videos he found on the internet, and that he had been motivated by the group's terrorist acts.

Sayed was indicted on 18 April on three counts of murder and two attempted murders.

On 3 February 2025, he was sentenced to three life sentences and an additional 40 years in prison by the Jerusalem District Court.
