= Goulburn Correctional Centre =

Supermax prison in New South Wales, Australia

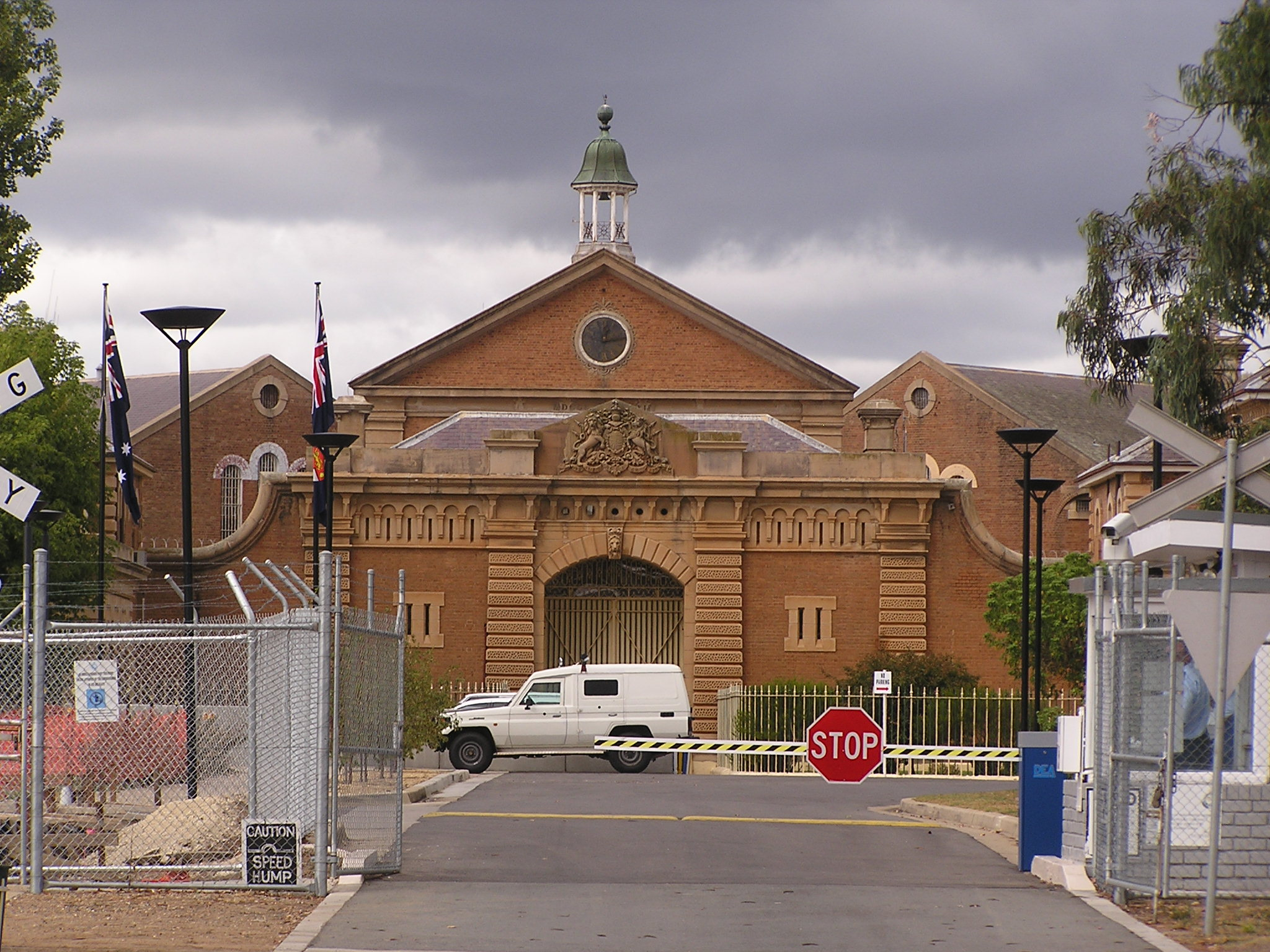
- The hand-carved sandstone gate and façade of the Goulburn Correctional Centre

- Location in New South Wales
- Location: Goulburn, New South Wales, Australia; 34°44′29″S 149°44′26″E
- Status: Operational
- Security class: Minimum security; Maximum security; Supermax
- Capacity: 500
- Opened: 1 July 1884; 142 years ago
- Former name: Goulburn Gaol (1847–1928); Goulburn Reformatory (1928–1949); Goulburn Training Centre (1949–1993)
- Managed by: Corrective Services NSW
- Website: Goulburn Correctional Centre
- Building details

General information
- Cost: A£61,000 (new gaol, 1884); A$20 million (HRMCC, 2001)

Technical details
- Material: Sandstone and brick

Design and construction
- Architect: James Barnet
- Architecture firm: Colonial Architect of New South Wales

Register of the National Estate
- Designated: 1 January 1977

New South Wales Heritage Register
- Official name: Goulburn Correctional Centre complex
- Designated: 2 April 1999
- Reference no.: 00808

The Goulburn Correctional Centre is an Australian supermaximum security prison for males. It is located in Goulburn, New South Wales, three kilometres north-east of the central business district. The facility is operated by Corrective Services NSW. The Complex accepts prisoners charged and convicted under New South Wales and/or Commonwealth legislation and serves as a reception prison for Southern New South Wales, and, in some cases, for inmates from the Australian Capital Territory.

The High Risk Management Centre (commonly called the SuperMax) was opened in September 2001. This was the first such facility in Australia and makes the centre the highest security prison in Australia. Supermax was completely renovated over 9 months and completed in April 2020.

The current structure incorporates a massive, heritage-listed hand-carved sandstone gate and façade that was opened in 1884 based on designs by the Colonial Architect, James Barnet. The complex is listed on the Register of the National Estate and the New South Wales State Heritage Register as a site of State significance.

== History ==
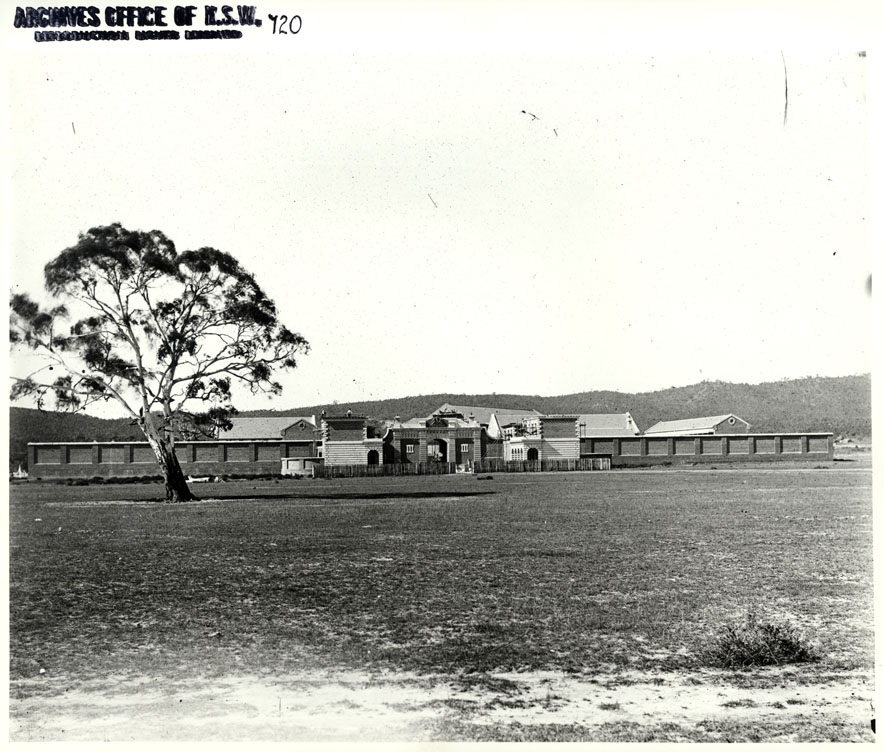
Goulburn Gaol with its now heritage-listed entrance

Goulburn's first lock-up was built around 1830 and gallows were built as early as 1832 when floggings were common. The first Goulburn Gaol was proclaimed on 28 June 1847, attached to the local Courthouse. When the Controller of Prisons first reported to parliament in 1878 Goulburn Gaol had accommodation for 63 segregated and 127 associated prisoners, and held 66 prisoners; inclusive of one female.

The plan for the new prison complex was developed in 1879 as part of a scheme to "bring the Colony from its backward position as regards to prison buildings", in J. Barnet's office under the supervision of William Coles. It was built by Frederick Lemm of Sydney between 1881 and 1884 at a cost of sixty-one thousand pounds. It was formally proclaimed as a public gaol, prison and house of correction from 1 July 1884. The gaol also became a place of detention for male prisoners under sentence or transportation. The new gaol increased the capacity of the gaol to 182 separated and 546 associated prisoners. In the year ended 1884 there were a total of 295 prisoners in custody. The opening of the gaol was part of the public works boom in the town during the 1869- 6 period and boosted employment as well as local industry. In 1893 prison labour was used to build an additional 127 cells to Goulburn Gaol, six exercise yards for 'youthful offenders' and a further yard for prisoners awaiting trial. This extension enabled Goulburn gaol to operate on the principle of restricted association which was gradually being adopted throughout the Colony. The following year additional cells were erected for female prisoners. The '7th class' prisoners were moved into the former women's cells thus preventing contact between these young prisoners and serious offenders. Steam cooking facilities were installed and a 70-foot (21 m) chimney was erected, new workshops were planned to create one of the most complete prison complexes in NSW.

Areas for agricultural cultivation were introduced in 1897-1899 and a bakery was constructed in 1916. In 1957, work commenced on a new cell block outside the walls of the gaol to accommodate prisoners employed at the agricultural area. This wing opened in 1961. During 1966-1967 a new education block and auditorium were completed.

For eighty years up to the 1970s, Goulburn was the establishment within the NSW penal system with a particular role in the reformation of first time and young offenders. It had a long history of agricultural and industrial training and education and built up a strong economic and social association with the town of Goulburn.

The prison was renamed the Goulburn Reformatory in 1928, and became known as the Goulburn Training Centre in 1949. In 1992 the centre was again renamed Goulburn Correctional Centre.

In 1986–1988, the first major redevelopment project was undertaken. It involved the extension of the perimeter walls to include a new industrial and sports area and the construction of a high security segregation unit.

Initially, Goulburn was one of the principal gaols in NSW. Its early prime focus was upon the first offenders where a program of employment, educational opportunities, physical education in addition to the scheme of restricted association was credited for a relatively low level of re-offending.

In 2015, Goulburn attracted controversy after a prisoner who was housed in the maximum security wing escaped after he cut through a gate at the back of a small secure exercise yard attached to his cell, tied bed sheets together to scale a wall, and put a pillow around his waist to avoid being hurt by razor wire. In the same year the Minister for Corrections announced that security would be tightened following a breach when an inmate was caught with a contraband mobile phone that he used to upload pictures and text to a social media website.

In late 2016, a two-year trial of mobile phone jamming equipment at the prison was approved by the Australian Communications & Media Authority; following a successful trial of jamming at the Lithgow Correctional Centre. In November 2021 a five-year permit was granted for the use of mobile phone jamming equipment at the prison.

== High-Risk Management Correctional Centre ==
Opened in 2001 at a cost of A$20 million, the Super Maximum facility is located within the confines of the Goulburn Correctional Centre. Initially called the High-Risk Management Unit (HRMU, also referred to by inmates as HARM-U), it was Australia's first Supermax prison since the closure of the Katingal facility at the Long Bay Correctional Centre in 1978. The facility is the most secure prison within the NSW correctional system, and the inmates are subject to very strict daily regimes, and under intense scrutiny by security. Goulburn HRMCC has received complaints by prisoners, including the lack of natural light and fresh air; access to legal books; the use of isolation and solitary confinement; limited and enclosed exercise; self-mutilation and harsh treatment. A 2008 report by the New South Wales Ombudsman explained that there is "no doubt… that the HRMU does not provide a therapeutic environment for these inmates".

In spite of the security measures inside the HRMCC, in June 2011 it was reported that an unnamed inmate in the centre had allegedly smuggled a mobile phone into the unit and plotted two kidnappings and a shooting. Criminal charges were laid against the inmate and his alleged co-conspirators.

== Heritage listing ==
The Goulburn Correctional Centre is significant for the strength of its original radial plan centred on the chapel, and the strength of the spatial relationships created by the plan. It has a close relationship with Goulburn township. Both town and institution have grown together and are economically and socially interdependent. It has a recorded association with a number of famous and infamous characters. It is also significant because of the way its continuous 110-year history of penal use is embodied in its physical fabric and documentary history.

Goulburn Correctional Centre was listed on the New South Wales State Heritage Register on 2 April 1999 having satisfied the following criteria.

The place is important in demonstrating the course, or pattern, of cultural or natural history in New South Wales.

The Goulburn Correctional Centre has a recorded association with a number of famous and infamous characters, both staff and inmates, including a Victoria Cross winner, bushrangers, larrikins, labour leaders and murderers.

The place is important in demonstrating aesthetic characteristics and/or a high degree of creative or technical achievement in New South Wales.

The Goulburn Correctional Centre is significant for the strength of its original radial plan centred on the chapel, and the strength of the spatial relationships created by the plan. It is significant for the quality, inventiveness and durability of its original masonry, the unusually fine and sturdy roof structures in the chapel and radial wings and the harmonious textures and colours of its original brick, stone, render, slate and iron work. It is located above the junction of the Wollondilly and Mulwarree Ponds, with views to the north and east.

The place has strong or special association with a particular community or cultural group in New South Wales for social, cultural or spiritual reasons.

The Goulburn Correctional Centre has a close relationship with Goulburn township. Both town and institution have grown together and are economically and socially interdependent. Goulburn has become the major judicial and penal centre of the Southern Highlands.

The place has potential to yield information that will contribute to an understanding of the cultural or natural history of New South Wales.

The Goulburn Correctional Centre is significant because of the way its continuous 110-year history of penal use is embodied in its physical fabric and documentary history.

The place possesses uncommon, rare or endangered aspects of the cultural or natural history of New South Wales.

Goulburn was one of the two Maclean-inspired gaols in NSW which best incorporated all that had been learned of penal design in the nineteenth century. The other, Bathurst Correctional Complex, has lost its chapel and been substantially remodelled.

== Notable prisoners ==
The following individuals have been imprisoned at the Goulburn Correctional Centre:

Inmate name	Date sentenced	Length of sentence	Currently incarcerated	Date eligible for release	Nature of conviction / Notoriety	Notes
Malcolm George Baker	6 August 1993	Six consecutive terms of life imprisonment plus 25 years	Died in 2024	No possibility of parole	Central Coast Massacre, 1992	
Stephen Leslie Bradley	10 October 1960	Penal servitude for life	Died in 1968	Indefinite sentence	Sydney Opera House lottery killing, 1960	
Darryl Burrell		20 years	Died in 2012 of cancer		Convicted of armed robbery. Managed to escape briefly after playing soccer for the prison team.	
Leslie Alfred Camilleri		Two consecutive terms of life imprisonment plus 183 years	Yes	No possibility of parole	The Bega schoolgirl murders and the murder of Prue Bird in 1992; held at the prison before being extradited.	
Khaled Cheikho	15 February 2010	27 years	Yes		Conspiring to manufacture explosives for use in the 2005 Sydney terrorism plot	
Moustafa Cheikho	15 February 2010	26 years	Yes		Conspiring to manufacture explosives for use in the 2005 Sydney terrorism plot	
Raymond John Denning					Armed robber and serial prison escapee.	
Mohamed Ali Elomar	15 February 2010	28 years	Yes		Conspiring to manufacture explosives for use in the 2005 Sydney terrorism plot	
Vester Allen Fernando	21 August 1997	Life imprisonment	Yes	No possibility of parole	Sentenced by Justice Allan Abadee in 1997 to life imprisonment without parole plus 10 years for the rape and murder of nurse Sandra Hoare at Wallgett in 1994.	
Sef Gonzales		Three concurrent terms of life imprisonment	Yes	No possibility of parole	The murders of his parents, Teddy and Mary Loiva, and younger sister Clodine.	
Bassam Hamzy					The 1998 shooting murder of Kris Toumazis outside a Sydney nightclub, and was subsequently convicted for conspiring to murder a witness against him. Founder of the Brothers for Life street gang.	
Abdul Rakib Hasan	15 February 2010	26 years	Yes		Conspiring to manufacture explosives for use in the 2005 Sydney terrorism plot	
Robert Lindsay Hughes	16 May 2014	Ten years and nine months with a non-parole period of six years	Released 2022	April 2020	Actor and star of Australian sitcom Hey Dad!, sentenced for two counts of sexual assault, seven counts of indecent assault, and one count of committing an indecent act involving girls from 6 to 15 during the 1980s.	
Sam Ibrahim					A brother of John Ibrahim, pleaded guilty to possession of four prohibited weapons.	
Mohammed Omar Jamal	15 February 2010	23 years	Yes		Conspiring to manufacture explosives for use in the 2005 Sydney terrorism plot	
Stephen Wayne "Shorty" Jamieson	19 September 1990	Life imprisonment plus 25 years	Yes	No possibility of parole	The murder of Janine Balding.	
Michael Kanaan		Three consecutive terms of life imprisonment plus 50 years 4 months	Yes	No possibility of parole	Three murders in Sydney in 1998.	
Bilal Khazal	25 September 2009	14 years	Paroled August 2020	9-year non-parole period	For producing a book whilst knowing it was connected with assisting a terrorist attack.	
Ivan Robert Marko Milat		Seven consecutive terms of life imprisonment plus 18 years	Died from esophageal and stomach cancer on 27 October 2019, at Long Bay Correctional Centre, Malabar, New South Wales	Deceased	The Belanglo State Forest backpacker murders.	
Les Murphy		Life imprisonment with a non-parole period of 34 years	Yes	Unlikely to ever be released	The murder of Anita Cobby.	
Michael Patrick Murphy		Life imprisonment plus 50 years	Died 21 February 2019	No possibility of parole	The murder of Anita Cobby.	
Malcolm John Naden		Life imprisonment plus 40 years	Yes	No possibility of parole	Two murders, an indecent assault on a 12-year-old girl, and the attempted murder of a police officer. At the time of his arrest in 2012, Naden was Australia's most wanted fugitive.	
Ngo Canh Phuong		Life imprisonment	Yes	No possibility of parole	The assassination of Cabramatta MP John Newman.	
George Savvas		25 years	Deceased in 1997	n/a	A wholesale narcotics dealer who escaped from the prison for nine months in 1997.	
Bilal Skaf		31 years' imprisonment	Yes	28-year non-parole period	The Sydney gang rapes in 2000.	
Robert Mark Steele	1993	Life imprisonment	Deceased 1994	No possibility of parole		
John Raymond Travers		Life imprisonment plus 65 years	Yes	No possibility of parole	The murder of Anita Cobby.	
Mark Mala Valera (van Krevel)		Two consecutive terms of life imprisonment	Yes	No possibility of parole	The 1998 murders of David O'Hearn and Frank Arkell.	
Lindsey Robert Rose	3 September 1998	Five consecutive terms of life imprisonment	Yes	No possibility of parole	The murders of Bill Cavanagh, Carmelita Lee, Reynette Holford, Fatma Ozonal and Kerrie Pang between 1984 and 1994.	
Abuzar Sultani		Three consecutive terms of life imprisonment	Yes	No possibility of parole	Murders of Pasquale Barbaro, Mehmet Yilmaz and Michael Davey in 2016.	

== See also ==
- Punishment in Australia
- Bathurst Correctional Complex
