= Aussie (poster) =

Australian poster series by Peter Drew

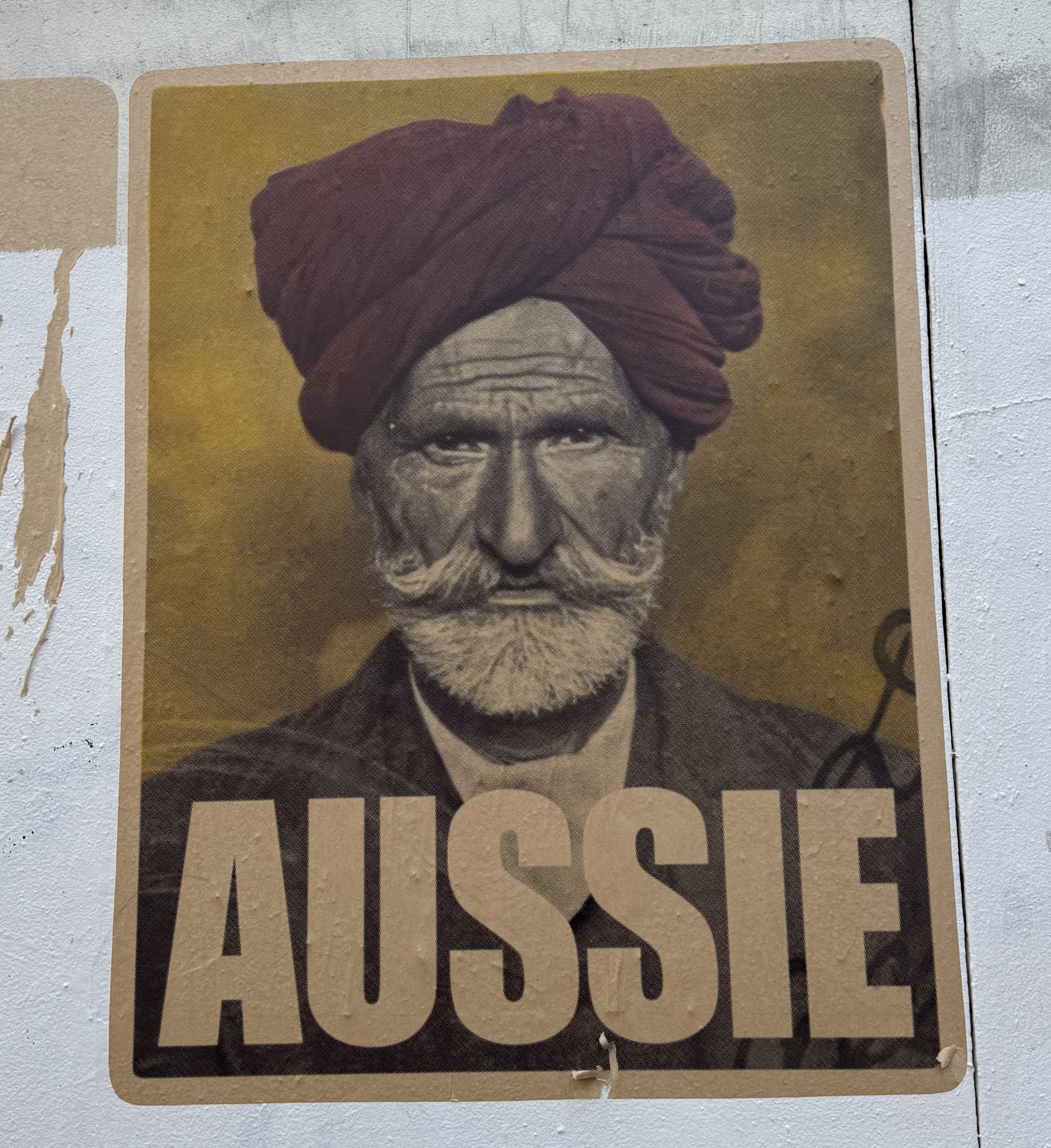
- "Aussie" poster on the corner of Wynyard and Kent Streets in Sydney
- Artist: Peter Drew
- Year: 2016–present
- Medium: Print
- Subject: Immigration and the White Australia Policy
- Website: www.peterdrewarts.com/monga-khan-aussie-posters

"Aussie" is a series of posters by Australian artist Peter Drew that started in 2016 and is plastered around Australian streets. The "Aussie" poster hinges on themes of immigration and the White Australia Policy.

== History and content ==
The "Aussie" series of posters started in 2016 with the first containing an image of Muslim hawker Monga Khan, who immigrated to Australia in 1895. The images used to produce these posters are retrieved from the national archives.

As of 2026, Drew says that around 5,000 posters have been plastered across Australian streets, the works have been installed in Sydney, Melbourne, and Adelaide. Drew has not relied on external funding to support the installation of the works. Some of the posters are held in the Art Gallery of NSW and the National Gallery of Victoria.

Drew sends versions of "Aussie" to schools for use as learning tools each January, exploring themes of Australian identity. Schools students have created similar versions to Drew's posters that contain markers of their own identities.

Drew created a special edition poster in 2020 to account for the COVID-19 pandemic in Australia called "Together Soon Enough".

Following immigration protests such as the March for Australia rally in 2025 in which protestors tore down an "Aussie" poster, Drew was inspired to create a poster depicting the protestors pulling down the poster and adding a question mark to the word "Aussie".

In January 2026, a right-wing influencer copied the "Aussie" poster with pictures of Naveed Akram one of the alleged shooters behind the 2025 Bondi Beach shooting, Bilal Skaf a serial gang rapist who led groups of men to commit Sydney gang rapes and Man Haron Monis, the man behind the Lindt Cafe siege.

== Content ==
Works have included the faces of a Jewish boy who fought in World War II, the grandfather of a politician, in addition to Khan. Drew was inspired to create the series as a result of incidents including the 2014 Lindt Cafe siege, headlines about ISIS, the Coalition's Stop the Boats policy, and attention shifting to One Nation and Reclaim Australia. All of the people featured in the works were subject to the White Australia Policy.

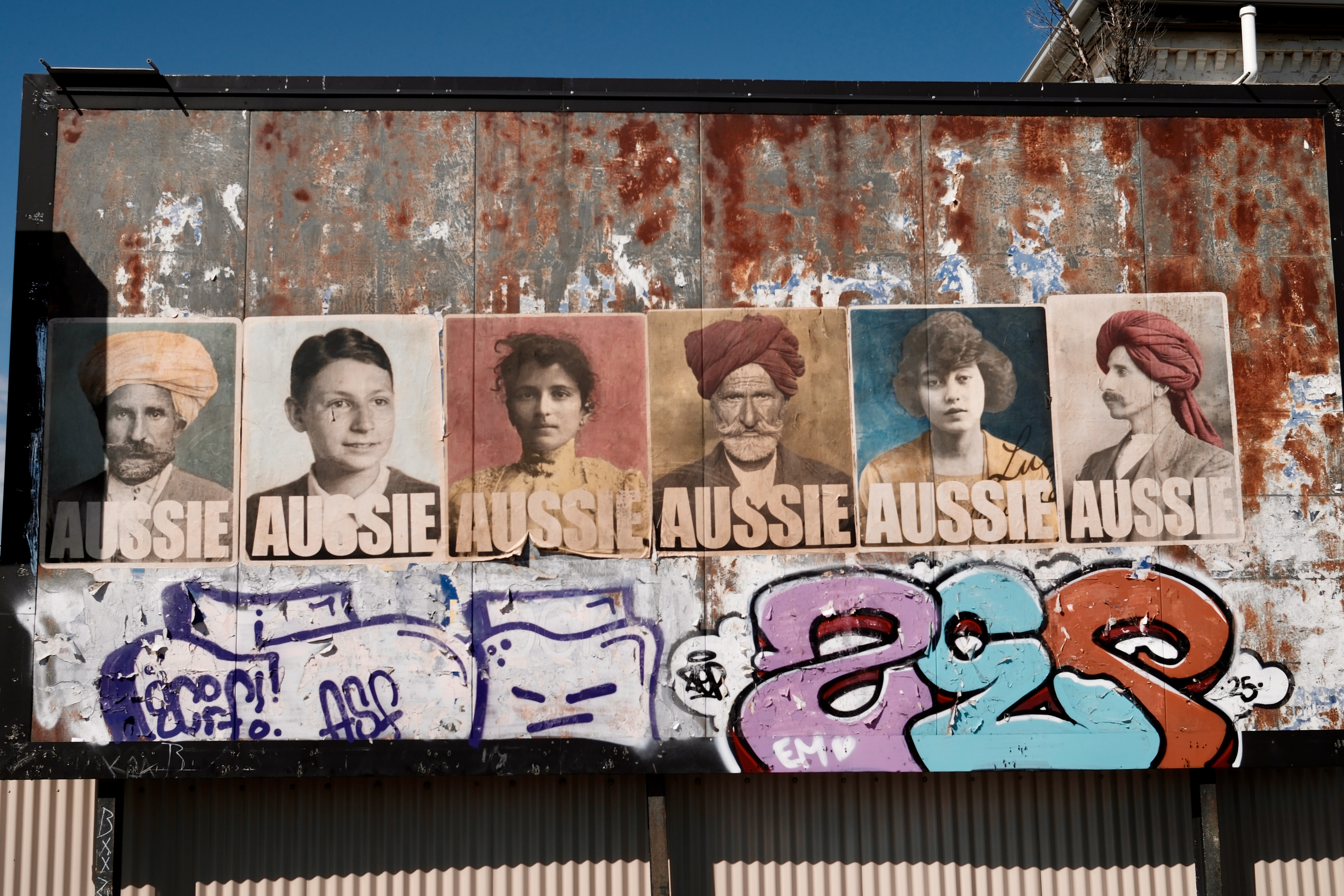
Aussie Posters in Semaphore, South Australia
