= Malcolm George Baker =

Australian spree killer (1947–2024)

- Born: 13 August 1947; Sydney, New South Wales, Australia
- Died: 23 June 2024 (aged 76); Prince of Wales Hospital, Randwick, New South Wales, Australia
- Children: 9
- Conviction: Murder ×6; Attempted Murder x1
- Penalty: 6× life imprisonment without parole plus 12 years

Details
- Date: 27 October 1992; 9:12 p.m. – 10:00 p.m.
- Killed: 6
- Injured: 1
- Weapon: Sawn-off Remington 12-gauge double-barrelled shotgun
- Imprisoned at: Goulburn, Long Bay

Malcolm George Baker (13 August 1947 – 23 June 2024) was an Australian spree killer from Terrigal, New South Wales, who died while serving six sentences of life imprisonment without parole for the shooting massacre of seven people, including an unborn child, in Terrigal, Bateau Bay and Wyong on the evening of 27 October 1992, an event known as the Central Coast massacre.

== Life ==
Baker was born on 13 August 1947 and resided with his parents and two sisters in the Penrith area during his childhood. He stated to authorities that he was exposed to significant domestic violence from both of his parents. Baker left school at the age of 15 and was at some point admitted to a psychiatry unit due to an overdose of sleeping tablets. He moved out of the family home when he was 17 years of age and relocated to the Central Coast. Baker was the father of nine children to six different women.

He worked as a mechanic and a panel beater. At some point prior to his imprisonment, Baker sustained an injury to his back, thereafter he developed a dependence on benzodiazepines.

== Shootings ==
On 27 October 1992, at the Terrigal apartment of his ex-girlfriend Kerry Gannon and her younger sister Lisa Gannon, Baker used his shotgun to smash the front window. Twenty-two-year-old Christopher Gall, a friend of the sisters, was the first person shot, suffering a gunshot wound to the face. Baker then entered the house and shot Kerry Gannon dead. Moving through the house he shot Lisa dead, who was eight months pregnant; later efforts to save her unborn child failed. Their father, Thomas Gannon, 43, who had been visiting for a few days, was found dead in the street.

Baker then drove north to the coastal suburb of Bateau Bay, where he arrived about ten minutes later, at the home of his 27-year-old son David. Baker shot his son through the back of his head. His body was discovered in the back yard of the home he shared with his ex girlfriend and her infant child.

Baker then went to the home of Ross Smith, 35, and Leslie Read, 25, in Wyong, 15 kilometres north of Bateau Bay. Arriving there shortly before 10 p.m., he shot and critically injured Read, then finding Smith in the bathtub shot and killed him instantly. Read died two hours later in hospital. Smith and Baker had had a confrontation about two years prior, over a business deal gone sour.

At 11.00 p.m., Baker walked into Toukley police station, surrendered, and handed over a sawn-off Remington 12-gauge double-barrelled shotgun. He was charged with six counts of murder and one count of attempted murder.

=== Sentencing ===
In the Supreme Court of New South Wales, Baker pleaded guilty to six charges of murder and one charge of attempted murder. On 6 August 1993 at Newcastle Court House, Baker was sentenced by Justice Peter Newman to six terms of life imprisonment without the possibility of parole and one term of twelve years for attempted murder.

| # | Victim | Age | Relationship | Charge | Sentence |
|---|---|---|---|---|---|
| 1 | Kerry Anne Gannan | 23 | Ex-partner | Murder | Life imprisonment without parole |
| 2 | Lisa May Gannan | 18 | Sister of Kerry Gannan | Murder | Life imprisonment without parole |
| 3 | Christopher Gall | 22 | Friend of Gannan sisters | Attempted murder | 12 years imprisonment |
| 4 | Thomas Benjamin Gannan | 43 | Ex-partner's father | Murder | Life imprisonment without parole |
| 5 | David Malcolm Baker | 27 | Son of Baker | Murder | Life imprisonment without parole |
| 6 | Ross Warren Smith | 36 | Former business associate | Murder | Life imprisonment without parole |
| 7 | Leslie Joyce Read | 26 | Partner of Ross Smith | Murder | Life imprisonment without parole |

== Incarceration and death ==
Baker was one of the first six inmates of Goulburn Gaol's High Risk Management Unit upon its creation in 2001. Baker was designated as an Extreme High Security inmate from 23 April 1997 until 3 June 2013, and a High-Risk inmate from 3 June 2013 until 25 August 2016. He spent a significant period of time in segregated custody between 31 July 1996 and 18 August 2012.

Baker suffered a stroke in May 2020 and another in 2021 which rendered him bedridden and fed by percutaneous endoscopic gastrostomy for the remainder of his life whilst incarcerated at Long Bay Prison Hospital. He was transferred to Prince of Wales Hospital for palliative care treatment on 10 June 2024 and died on 22 June 2024, aged 76.
