= Laurie Maher =

Australian former politician

Laurie Maher OAM

25th Mayor of the City of Gosford
- In office 30 September 2005 – 24 September 2007
- Deputy: Craig Doyle
- Preceded by: Malcolm Brooks
- Succeeded by: Jim Macfadyen
- In office 28 September 2010 – 8 September 2012
- Deputy: Craig Doyle
- Preceded by: Chris Holstein
- Succeeded by: Lawrie McKinna

Councillor of the City of Gosford
- In office 24 March 2004 – 8 September 2012

Personal details
- Party: Central Coast First
- Children: Paul Maher, John Maher

Laurence Joseph Maher is an Australian former politician who was the mayor of Gosford City Council and the CEO of Coast Shelter, a non-profit homelessness service assisting people in the Central Coast region of New South Wales, Australia.

== Career ==
Maher founded Coast Shelter in 1992 and held the position of CEO until his retirement in July 2018. In 2009, Maher was presented with an Award for Services to the Aboriginal Community by the Darkinjung Local Aboriginal Land Council.

He served as the mayor of Gosford, serving four terms. Maher was first elected to Council in 2004, elected as Mayor in 2007. Maher retired as mayor in 2012.

In 2011, Maher agreed to a proposed merger of Gosford and Wyong councils, stating the councils would become more effective in dealing with the needs of the regions as a single operation.

In the 2010 Australia Day Honours Maher was awarded the Medal of the Order of Australia (OAM) for "service to the community of Gosford through social welfare and local government organisations".

== Historical sex offences ==
Following a series of complaints made to the Royal Commission into Institutional Responses to Child Sexual Abuse, Strikeforce Eckersly was established by the Nepean Police Area Command in late 2016. On 20 April 2020, it was announced that a ninth man had been charged with historical sex offences, with the Newcastle Herald stating "Strike force investigators issued a Court Attendance Notice (CAN) for the offences of four counts of buggery, three counts of indecent assault on a male, and six counts of sexual assault knowing no consent given to an 81-year-old man on Thursday 5 March 2020."

Maher was named the following day by NBN news as the ninth person to face court over alleged misconduct committed at Mt Penang Training School. The alleged offences took place between 1977 and 1988.

Civic offices
Preceded by Malcolm Brooks	Mayor of the City of Gosford; 2005–2007	Succeeded by Jim Macfadyen
Preceded by Chris Holstein	Mayor of the City of Gosford; 2010–2012	Succeeded by Lawrie McKinna
