= Paul Sheehan (journalist) =

Australian journalist

Paul Sheehan (born 1951) is an Australian former columnist and senior writer for the Sydney Morning Herald, and the Melbourne Age where he has been day editor, chief of staff and Washington correspondent. He generally writes from a conservative viewpoint in the opinion of observers.

== Early life and education ==
Sheehan is a graduate of the Australian National University in Canberra and the Graduate School of Journalism at Columbia University in New York.

== Career ==
Sheehan was a Nieman Fellow at Harvard University. His work has appeared in The New York Times, The New Yorker, The Atlantic Monthly and Foreign Policy.

Sheehan's first book, Among the Barbarians, was published in 1998. The book, written by Sheehan to "lift the veil of intimidation" hanging over critical discussion of multiculturalism and immigration, spent five months on Australian best-seller lists. In 2003, he released his second book, The Electronic Whorehouse, a critical examination of the media in Australia. His third book, Girls Like You (2005), commented on the Ashfield gang rapes, a series of gang rape trials in Australia involving four brothers who had recently migrated to Australia from Pakistan.

== Commentary ==
Sheehan's columns in the Sydney Morning Herald were generally written from a right-wing perspective and were noted for their criticism of the "human rights industry", Muslims in Australia, large-scale immigration and the Australian Labor Party. Other topics covered by Sheehan included criticism of the Australian legal system's handling of sexual assault cases as well as criticism of the neo-conservative ideology.

Paul Sheehan, who suffers from chronic pain, has written an article promoting magnesium-rich "Unique Water" as a pain relief. This was criticised by ABC-TV Media Watch, and may be merely a placebo effect.

On 24 February 2016, Sheehan published a column in the Sydney Morning Herald titled, 'The story of Louise: we'll never know the scale of the rape epidemic in Sydney', which described the horrific rape of a nurse in the Inner City of Sydney in 2002. He subsequently published a retraction of this article on 25 February 2016 in the Sydney Morning Herald. Sheehan left the Sydney Morning Herald in April 2016 without having contributed any further articles.
