= Ashfield gang rapes =

2002 Australian crime spree

The Ashfield gang rapes was a series of attacks involving indecent assault and rape which were carried out in Ashfield, New South Wales, Australia over a six-month period in 2002. Four Pakistani brothers and a Nepali student were convicted and imprisoned for the rapes.

== Perpetrators ==
The Khan brothers were referred to in court reports by their initials only, as two of the brothers were 16 and 17 at the time of the crimes. The fifth defendant, Ram Shrestha, was a Nepalese immigrant and friend of the "K" brothers. As of July 2005, MSK was 26 years old, MAK, 25, MRK, 20, and MMK, 19. As of 2003, Shrestha, also referred to merely by his initials, S, was 25.

The eldest, MSK, was married with a six-year-old son as of 2005. They had grown up in Pakistan and had been brought to Sydney in 2000 by their father, who provided them with a house in Ashfield. He unsuccessfully attempted in court to provide an alibi for his sons, and was facing perjury charges at the time of his death in November 2006.

== Trials ==
News media were banned from reporting on the trials until July 2005 to prevent tainting the jury pool.

In 2003, all five defendants were found guilty of "aggravated sexual assault in company" committed on 28 July 2002. In April 2004, the four brothers were sentenced to a total of 70 years' imprisonment over the 28 July assaults. Ram Shrestha had hanged himself in his prison cell on or about 15 April 2004, a week before the sentencing. In late 2004 three of the brothers appealed against their sentences, but their appeals were rejected in November 2005.

In the March 2005 trial of MSK, MAK, and MMK for the February rapes, MSK divulged the K brothers' 2003 convictions in open court, a fact which had been kept from the jury to ensure a fair trial. Prosecutor Ken McKay suggested MSK's outburst appeared "calculated" to have the trial aborted. The trial was aborted for MAK and MMK, but not for MSK.

MSK initially fabricated evidence that he had "consensual" sex with a 14-year-old, before admitting in late 2005 that he had lied.

MSK, as well as his barrister, argued that MSK's actions were influenced by alcohol and cultural conditioning. MSK apologised to his victim in court and said he understood his actions were wrong now that he better understood "Australian culture." Using culture as an excuse disgusted the father of one victim, who was Muslim.

In April 2006, the New South Wales Supreme Court increased the sentences of three of the brothers. Justice Peter Hidden added a minimum of five years to MSK's sentence and a minimum two extra years to MAK's jail term for the February and 14 July rapes. Their younger brother, MMK, was sentenced to 12 months' imprisonment, to be served concurrently and in juvenile detention, for having sex with an underage girl on the night of one of the rapes, as well as for an indecent assault in November 2001.

In October 2007, it was reported that three of the brothers were facing further rape charges. In March 2009 MRK pleaded guilty to aggravated sexual assault on a 15-year-old girl in 2002; he was due to be sentenced on 20 March 2009.

== Crimes ==
- 20 January: Two sisters, 18 and 16, are taken to one of the brothers’ Ashfield house. MAK indecently assaults the younger one, but she manages to fight him off. MRK robs her.
- 14 February: Three girls are picked up by MMK and MAK and taken to the house, where they are supplied with alcohol. One girl is repeatedly raped by MSK and MAK in one of the bedrooms while her friends are in the lounge room. She alleged MMK also raped her and hit her when she tried to fight him off.
- 28 July: A 13-year-old girl is raped by MMK, MSK then rapes her twice, followed by Shrestha.
- 28 July: HG and LS, aged 16 and 17, are lured, threatened at knifepoint and sexually assaulted at the Ashfield house by the five rapists. One of the victims was told that the other had been killed because she had resisted orders. These are the first girls to come forward, sparking the police investigation against the rapists.

MMK is also alleged to have indecently assaulted a 15-year-old girl, Y, in November 2001, but she did not wish to go to trial. On 12 May 2002, he allegedly indecently assaulted two other girls whom police cannot locate, molesting them while he videotaped them. After one assault, MRK allegedly told one of the victims, "If a Leb wants to fuck you, you fuck them", believed to be an allusion to the Sydney gang rapes by a group of Lebanese-Australian men led by Bilal Skaf.

== Aftermath ==
On 9 February 2007 it was reported that the two eldest brothers had been assaulted in Goulburn Correctional Centre by a gang of eight other inmates. One was taken to Canberra Hospital with critical head injuries. Seven convicts appeared in court via videolink in March 2009 to face charges over the assault.

MRK, the first of the brothers to be eligible, was granted parole by the State Parole Authority in April 2010 and released the following month. Victims called for deporting the perpetrators back to Pakistan, but legal experts considered it "highly unlikely" that revoking the brothers' Australian citizenship would be legal.

MMK was paroled in June 2018, prompting another campaign for the brothers to be stripped of citizenship and deported. Immigration Minister Peter Dutton stated that he would have liked to do so, but it was not possible.

== See also ==
- Sydney gang rapes
- 1995 Okinawa rape incident
