= Bilal Khazal =

Australian Muslim

- Born: Bilal Saadallah Khazal; Lebanon
- Occupation: Former baggage handler
- Employer: Qantas
- Status: Released
- Criminal charge: For producing a book whilst knowing it was connected with assisting a terrorist attack
- Penalty: 14 years in prison, with a non-parole period of 9 years

Bilal Saadallah Khazal (also Belal Khazal) is a convicted Lebanese Australian criminal who served a custodial sentence of fourteen years, with a non-parole period of nine years, for producing a book whilst knowing it was connected with assisting a terrorist attack. Khazal who was a former baggage handler for Qantas Airways at Sydney Airport, and a prominent figure in the Islamic Youth Movement.

== Background and criminal activities ==
Born in Lebanon, the father of two was listed in a Central Intelligence Agency report as a member of Al-Qaeda and it was claimed that he had received training from the Taliban in 1998. He was also a subject of intelligence reports at the time of the 2000 Sydney Olympics. The television program Four Corners has accused him of being a confidant of al-Qaeda's leader Osama bin Laden.

On 25 September 2009 the Supreme Court of New South Wales sentenced Bilal Khazal to 14 years in prison, with a non-parole period of 9 years, for producing a book, titled 'Provisions on the Rules of Jihad', whilst knowing it was connected with assisting a terrorist attack that would happen in Australia. In 2011 the conviction was overturned and Khazal was granted bail by the Supreme Court of New South Wales in Sydney on 7 June 2011, after spending nearly three years in jail. Khazal's barrister, Charles Waterstreet, said that his jail conditions had been "just one step down from Guantánamo Bay".

The Australian Government appealed to the High Court of Australia which, in August 2012, unanimously overturned the earlier dismissal and Khazal's bail was revoked by the NSW Court of Criminal Appeal. While Waterstreet expressed disappointment at the ruling, Nicola McGarrity, a lecturer in terrorism law at the University of NSW, called the High Court ruling unsurprising as it was the only reasonable conclusion based on the evidence. In June 2013 the High Court dismissed an appeal against the severity of Khazal's sentence.

In September 2017, Khazal, having served his nine-year non-parole period, was refused parole after a secret hearing heard that the Australian Government received high-level advice that Khazal's release would put at risk public safety and national security. Khazal is serving his sentence in the Goulburn Correctional Centre's SuperMax.

Khazal was released on 30 August 2020 under a strict control order that includes wearing a tracking device and a curfew.

== See also ==
- List of notable converts to Islam
- Islamist terrorism
