= Peter Drew =

Australian artist (born 1983)

- Born: 1983 (age 42–43); Adelaide, South Australia
- Education: Glasgow School of Art (MFA)
- Known for: Poster art, urban art
- Notable work: "Aussie" series

Peter Drew (born 1983) is an Australian artist, activist, writer, and filmmaker. He is best known for his posters and street art, in particular his "Aussie" series of posters, first posted in 2016. Apart from their placement on walls in city streets, his posters are held in galleries and libraries around Australia. His other poster campaigns have included "Stop the Boats" (2013); "Real Australians Say Welcome" (2015); and "Hugs" (2020–21). His art is also held in public galleries and has featured in exhibitions. His public art has received mixed reactions, and he likes to engage with those who have a negative reaction to it. In April 2026, Drew reprised his 2016 project, sticking up copies of his 2016 "Aussie" series of posters around the country.

== Early life and education ==
Peter Drew was born in Adelaide, South Australia, in 1983. He was raised in a "somewhat conservative" family, and initially disliked political art. As a child, he loved taking risks, such as going into abandoned buildings, and climbing buildings.

He started studying accountancy, but soon dropped out. He spent some time doing little, then enrolled to study psychology and philosophy at university, in a bit to understand the world, and himself. While studying, he started experimenting with art, first painting on canvas, but there was not much of a market for art at that time. He then turned to street art and graffiti, taught by a housemate, before starting to created handmade screen-printed posters.

In 2013 he earned a master's degree from the Glasgow School of Art in Glasgow, Scotland.

== Career ==
Drew has started practising as an artist in 2006, and has also published works on visual arts since 2009. His work has been exhibited since 2007. Themes in Drew's artwork are listed as "memory, nationalism, masculinity, criminality, brown paper, and mythology".

In 2009, he created his first meme, when he was a keen cyclist. Using a stencil, he sprayed a design of a bike next to a car, with the words "This one runs on fat and makes you money" under the bike, and "This one runs on money and makes you fat" on several footpaths in Adelaide. He posted the image to Facebook and it started spreading on cycling blogs, and was printed on t-shirts, coffee mugs, and tea towels.

Before going to study in Scotland, he became known for his "Einstein" and "Adelaide's Forgotten Outlaws" posters. He says it was while he was in Glasgow that he started thinking about his Australian identity, with discussions about the 2013 Australian election taking place among his peers.

In 2013, Drew started his "Stop the boats" campaign, to protest government policy that included the slogan "Stop the boats". During the 2015 refugee crisis, when around 1.3 million people were displaced owing to the Syrian civil war, Libyan Civil War, and war in Iraq, the Australian Government restricted the use of photographs of refugees arriving by boat, and kept them incarcerated in offshore detention centres. In response to the politicisation of migration, which included the "Stop the boats" and demonisation of Muslim men and refugees, in April 2015 Drew launched another campaign, "Real Australians Say Welcome". The wording was inspired by words in the national anthem, "Advance Australia Fair": "For those who've come across the seas, We've boundless plains to share. With courage let us all combine, to Advance Australia Fair". The campaign also included a poster featuring a 19th-century clipper and the words: "Australia says: Stop the Boats! To avoid Aboriginal genocide, stop Great Britain's illegal migration to Australia!", referring to the colonisation of Australia. He uses a glue made of cooked-up flour and water to stick his posters to walls.

In 2016 Drew started creating a series of posters known as his "Aussie" series, that have been posted around Australia. He creates the images from black and white photographs held in the National Archives of Australia (NAA), and, using screen-printing, adds colour to them in order to create posters. The photographs are of people in Australia that were taken during the ""white Australia" policy (1901–1958), for the purpose of those domiciled in Australia prior to the enactment of the Immigration Restriction Act 1901 being granted documents called Certificate of Exemption to the Dictation Test (CEDT), giving them the right of return to Australia after leaving for a period. The photographs provided proof of identity Each poster in this series has the word "AUSSIE" emblazoned across the bottom.

Drew's first posters were of Monga Khan, (Note: This was a policy by which people of colour were not allowed to migrate to Australia between 1901 (federation year) and 1958. The policy was enforced by using a dictation test that was so difficult that not a single person passed it between 1909 and 1958.) a Muslim immigrant and hawker from British India (now Pakistan) who sold local and imported goods in Victoria, Australia. He was one of a generation of settlers now collectively referred to as the "Afghans". Drew chose his image as "a man who was visibly a Muslim, and heroic", following a wave of Islamophobia in Australia following the Lindt Cafe siege. Drew started a crowdfunding campaign to raise enough to fund 1000 posters, an amount which was quickly exceeded. He decided to use the extra funds to publish a book consisting of historical fiction works commissioned from artists and writers. The resulting book, The Legend of Monga Khan, an Aussie Folk Hero, includes stories, poems, and artworks about Monga Khan. The book was co-edited by Royce Kurmelovs and includes a foreword by Nici Cumpston, curator at the Art Gallery of South Australia. There were 36 contributors to the book, which is 140 pages long and available as an ebook. The book launch took place at The Boroughs bookstore in East Brunswick, Melbourne, on 15 March 2016.

He followed up with looking for images in the archive showing people who evoked empathy, in particular children, which reflected "sorrow and heartbreak". He says that he wanted to show the absurdity of the idea that such people are a threat, and that they had to have special exemption papers based on their perceived race. His aim is to invoke curiosity in people observing the posters on walls as they walk or drive past, leading to the question "Who is that person?".

In 2016–2017, Drew made a short film called Broken Hill (originally titled The Khalik Family Kite), about the Shamroze family, who are descendants of the "Afghan" cameleer Shamroze Khan.

In January 2017, he was working on his "Real Australians Seek Welcome", featuring 250 designs: one for each Indigenous language group, focusing on the original inhabitants of the continent, Aboriginal Australians. He said that after that, he wanted to create art that would encourage tourism to his home state, based on vintage posters of the 1930s.

In July 2018, he was preparing to visit the United States (the "stupid country") to generate discussion about its gun laws with his posters. He said that he wanted to learn more about political entrepreneurship, in which offensive comments play an important role; for this, he created a "Please be offensive" poster.

In 2018, Drew appeared on a panel discussing national identity at the Adelaide Festival of Ideas.

In 2019, Drew published a memoir, entitled Poster boy : a memoir of art and politics. The book was launched at Imprints Bookshop in Hindley Street, Adelaide, on 7 August 2019. An extract from the book was published in The Monthly on 20 August.

In 2020 Drew created a poster for the South Australia Nature Festival, picturing Boomer Beach at Port Elliot.

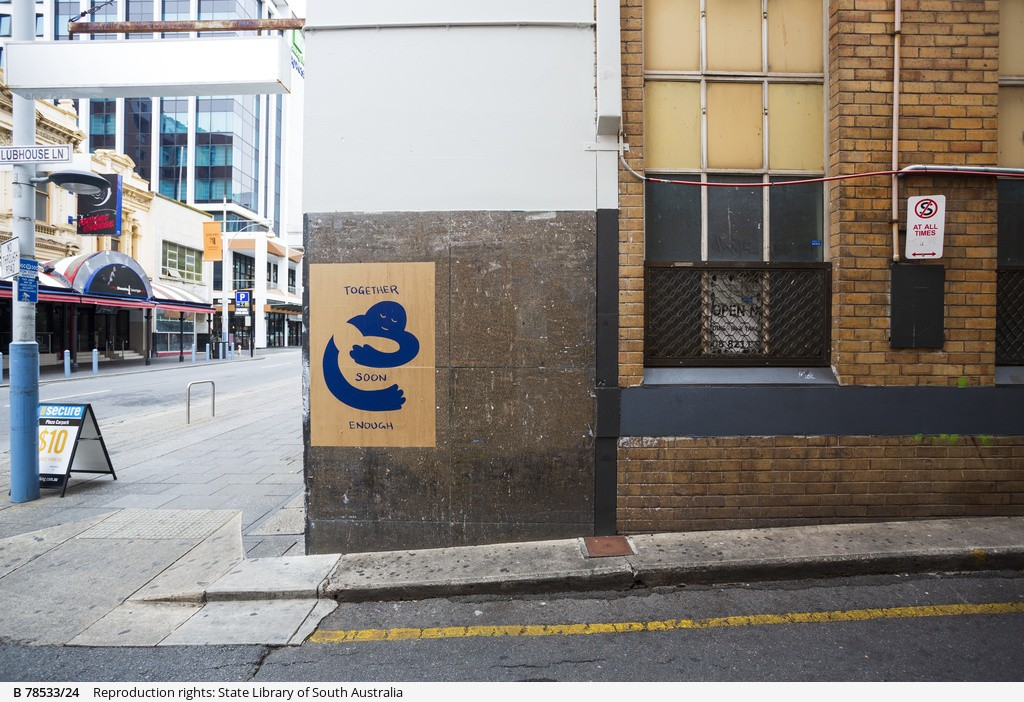
Corner of Clubhouse Lane and Hindley Street, Adelaide, May 2021, showing "Together soon enough" poster by Drew

During the COVID-19 pandemic in Australia (2020–21), Drew created his "Hugs" series of posters, offering with symbols and words of hope. One design posted around Adelaide city centre and suburbs has a design showing an abstract figure leaning forward in a hug, with the words "Together soon enough". He sent the posters to anyone anywhere "who had a wall to paste them up on".

In early 2025, Drew created a series of self-portraits, for an exhibition called The Narcissist, shown at Peter Walker Fine Art in Adelaide in March. He had previously undergone a "self-transformation" by undertaking bodybuilding exercises, which he had posted on Instagram, evoking a range of responses from his followers. He said that his purpose in doing this was "to gently raise the question: do you think this culture of activism has an element of narcissism?"

In late 2025, the 10th anniversary of his "Aussie" series, at a time when "march for Australia" protests were taking place across the country in 2025, Drew is creating new designs. He says that his new posters "defend our right to be patriotic, and not let the other side claim that space". His plans for 2026 include the printing and posting of around 1000 new posters, and he aims to make around 500 available for purchase on his website to help fund his trip around Australia, after starting in Adelaide in the summer. He plans to visit all capital cities and some rural locations, documenting his journey on Instagram; he will also ask his followers to suggest places to put up his posters.

As of September/October 2025, Drew estimated that he had himself put up around 800 posters around Adelaide, and 3,000–5,000 around the country.

"Aussie" posters in the Garden of Unearthly Delights at the 2026 Adelaide Fringe

In 2026, Drew reprised his 2016 project, sticking up new posters of his original set around Australia. One set were put up on the Bondi Art Wall at Bondi Beach.

== Meaning and impact ==
According to Drew:

When you address the public through the street you're entering into a tradition that emphasises our fundamental freedom of expression, over the value of property... I enjoy examining our collective identities and my aim is always to emphasise the connections that bind up, rather than the fractures that divide us.

His work has an ironic element: "The posters I made are almost ironically instructive. They're almost fascistic, you know? I hope people can see the humour in that". He has also said that his posters are his way of expressing his love for Australia, and they are meant as a positive message, not to contradict others' negative messaging. Drew sees himself as an artist first and foremost: "I see everything I do as art disguised as propaganda. Without spiritual aspiration, political art is little more than a visual commentary on power". He says that when asked what he believes makes an Aussie, he references a speech made by prime minister Bob Hawke in 1988:

The commitment is all. The commitment to Australia is the only thing needed to be a true Australian.

Jane Lydon, Wesfarmers Chair of Australian History at the University of Western Australia, wrote, in an essay about the role of public art in shaping perceptions of asylum seekers:

The posters represent a form of public art aiming to challenge forms of exclusion and particularly Australia's restrictive culture of securitisation... They arouse forms of visual citizenship — an active mode of engagement in which an imagined political community is produced by all participants, including the viewer.

In April 2015, when Drew was in Melbourne sticking up posters, his wife uploaded a "Real Australians Say Welcome" poster to the website The Design Files, which, she told him "every young, aspiring creative in Australia dreams of being featured on". The following day, an ABC journalist phoned him and his poster started receiving an "avalanche of attention" from other artists and designers and illustrators, some of whom re-created and enhanced the slogan. News outlets and other platforms, including SBS, The Guardian, BuzzFeed, Mashable, Junkee, and ABC News ran stories. #RealAustraliansSayWelcome trended across social media platforms, becoming another.

In 2024, his "AUSSIE" series was used in schools to encourage discussion about the question "What does a real Aussie look like?".

In September 2025, Gurmesh Singh, a National Party MP in the Parliament of NSW, announced in parliament that he had contacted Drew after seeing one of his posters. He had looked in the archives and found a photograph of his great-grandfather, an Indian farmer who settled on the Mid North Coast of New South Wales in the late 1800s. Singh said that it distressed him and many others in the Indian Australian community to see Drew's posters being torn down.

Drew's posters have brought both positive and negative responses from the public, in some cases including counter-posters and graffiti. At one of the 2025 "March for Australia" rallies, one participant tore down one of Drew's posters. Drew responded by creating a poster depicting the incident, with the caption "AUSSIE?" and posting it on social media – questioning whether this kind of behaviour is part of Australian culture. He has said "Typically, we react with fear and anger towards the sort of people who tore down the posters, but I think they are lost and in need of help". He said that the reaction at the March for Australia rallies gave him the impetus to produce more posters. He says of his art: "If it didn't upset anybody, then it wouldn't really have any bite to it. But to be honest, I still want to win over those people who don't agree with my work".

In February 2026, a 21-year-old "influencer", a Scotch College graduate from a wealthy family who has links to the neo-Nazi group National Socialist Network, stuck up copies of the "Aussie" series with pictures of Donald Trump, as well as Bondi shooting terrorist Naveed Akram, Man Haron Monis, and other criminals. They were condemned by Melbourne Lord Mayor Nick Reece, who called them "sick and "absolutely abhorrent". The posters were removed within an hour and Victoria Police were investigating. Drew, referring to this reaction, said "There's a real sort of angry nihilism to it... They're just wanting to get under people's skin".

Drew's work has been compared to England-based activist-artist Banksy. As of August 2026, Drew had upwards of 88,000 followers on Instagram, doubling the number he had around a year earlier.

== Exhibitions ==
Drew's work has been exhibited at major arts institutions around Australia, including the Art Gallery of South Australia and the National Gallery of Australia (AGSA), but is best known for his posters on the city streets. Sticking up posters is actually illegal in many jurisdictions; Drew has been fined three times, in South Australia, New South Wales, and in Canberra.

For the 2017 History Festival in South Australia, an exhibition of posters entitled Posters Empowering Community: A Historical Snapshot of SA Poster Artmaking was held at the Kerry Packer Civic Gallery Exhibition at the University of South Australia. Drew's work was included in the exhibition.

In 2020, an exhibition entitled Flags 1 was held at AGSA, with works featuring the Australian flag blended with photographs from the NAA. In May–June 2022, an exhibition of Drew's works entitled Flags 2 was held at the Jan Murphy Gallery in Fortitude Valley, Brisbane.

An exhibition entitled Aussie: Posters by Peter Drew was held at the National Museum of Australia in Canberra from 11 May to 24 September 2023.

== Collections ==
Drew's works are held in galleries and libraries around Australia, including the National Library of Australia, the State Library of South Australia, the State Library of New South Wales, the Art Gallery of South Australia, Museums Victoria (including the NGV), Art Gallery of New South Wales, QAGOMA, and the Victorian Immigration Museum.

== Personal life ==
Drew's birth family holds conservative beliefs. His younger brother wore a MAGA cap to the family Christmas celebrations, while his elder brother lived with his parents and "spends his days as an online troll".

He married Julie.

== Publications ==
- Kurmelovs, Royce; Cumpston, Nici; Drew, Peter (2016), The legend of Monga Khan : an Aussie folk hero, Peter Drew Arts, ISBN 978-0-9954388-0-4
- Drew, Peter (2019), Poster boy : a memoir of art and politics, Black Inc, ISBN 978-1-76064-133-7
