= Monga Khan =

Muslim immigrant (c.1870–1930)

Monga Khan (Potwari: مونگا خاں; c. 1870 – October 1930) was a Muslim immigrant and hawker from British India (now Pakistan) who sold local and imported goods in Victoria, Australia. He has become widely known owing to his image being used on a series of posters created by Australian artist Peter Drew, known as the "Aussie" series.

== Early life ==
Monga Khan was born around 1870 in a Muslim family in what was then British India, now Pakistan.

He was originally from Bathroi, a village in Dadyal Tehsil of Mirpur District in present-day Azad Kashmir, Pakistan. (Note: The first translation of his place of birth as the village of Batrohan, near the Punjabi city of Ambala (in what is now Haryana), was by Crystal Jordan in her early research of Monga Khan prior to 2015. Later in 2016 Jordan corrected Monga's place of birth to Bathroi, Mirpur, Kashmir; however, Batrohan has been mentioned in other places and documents since that time.)

== Life in Australia ==
Khan travelled to Australia in search of work, although he was not one of the many men from South Asia who were indentured or brought to work in Australia in the late 19th century, that generation of settlers now collectively referred to as the "Afghans".

Khan arrived in the colony of Victoria in 1895. He worked as a hawker in and around Melbourne, Ballarat, Beaufort, and Ararat. He was known for helping other fellow hawkers in plying their trade. He, like other hawkers, often stayed at a farm in Trawalla, where he camped with Vosile Khan, Ludda Khan, and Zaan Khan, who were believed to be his relatives. The men would pick up their goods from the Trawalla railway station and carry them to the farm on their backs. They were also observed to smoke hookah and slaughter their animals for meat in their traditional way.

In 1908, Khan suffered from illness and returned to British India aboard the SS Omrah to meet his wife and family. In March 1914, he briefly suffered a period of economic hardship and applied for insolvency at the Ararat Court of Insolvency.

In 1916, he was again suffering from a bout of illness and was planning a journey home, due to which he applied for a Certificate of Exemption to the Dictation Test (CEDT). Because Khan had arrived in Australia prior to the introduction of the Immigration Restriction Act 1901, better known as the White Australia policy, when he wished to return to India he obtained a Certificate of Exemption to the Dictation Test (CEDT), which proved he had been domiciled in Australia before 1901. This enabled him to leave Australia and be re-admitted on his return, unlike many immigrants who arrived after 1901 and were not able to prove they had been domiciled in Australia before that time.

== Death ==
Khan became ill and died of cerebral thrombosis in 1930 in Ararat Hospital. He was buried on 27 October at the Ararat Cemetery.

== Legacy ==
A photograph of Khan created in 1916 (as recorded in the National Archives of Australia) was first used in the year 2016 by Australian artist Peter Drew, as part of his "Aussies" poster series. The poster featured an image of Khan with the word "Aussie" written underneath.

According to Drew, the purpose of the artwork was to draw attention to the Australian Government's recent immigration policies, and symbolically reimagine the discourse on Australian identity. The project was followed by the fictional book and ebook The Legend of Monga Khan: An Aussie Folk Hero, which included illustrations, poems and short stories inspired by Khan's life.

== See also ==
- Mirpuri diaspora
- "Afghan" cameleers in Australia
- Dervish Bejah
- Dost Mahomet
- Hassan Musa Khan
