= Mount Penang Juvenile Justice Centre =

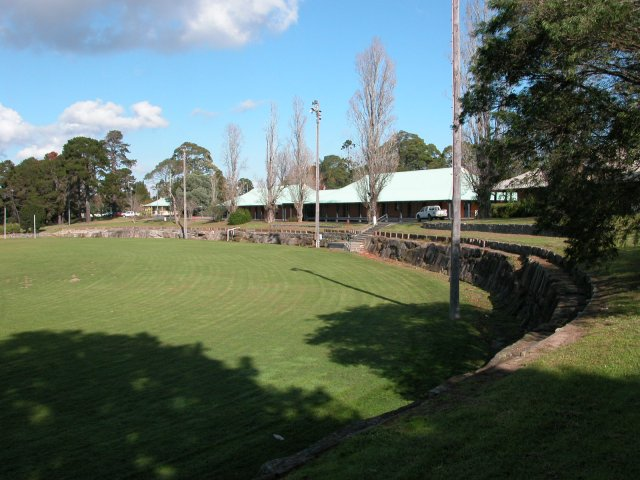
- Mount Penang Parklands

- Location within New South Wales Location within Australia
- 33.4281°S 151.3005°E
- Location: Pacific Highway, Somersby, Central Coast, New South Wales, Australia

History
- Built: 1912–

Site notes
- Architect: James Nangle
- Owner: Minister for Community Services

New South Wales Heritage Register
- Official name: Mount Penang Parklands; The Farm Home for Boys; Girrakool; Kariong Juvenile Detention Centre; Mt Penang Parklands
- Type: state heritage (landscape)
- Designated: 19 September 2003
- Reference no.: 1667
- Type: Historic Landscape
- Category: Landscape – Cultural
- Builders: Department of Public Works and Services

The Mount Penang Juvenile Justice Centre is a heritage-listed former juvenile detention centre, now a parkland and redevelopment precinct known as Mount Penang Parklands. It is situated on the Pacific Highway at Somersby, Central Coast, New South Wales, Australia. It was designed by James Nangle and built from 1912 by the New South Wales Public Works Department.

It was also known as The Farm Home for Boys, Girrakool and Kariong Juvenile Detention Centre. It was added to the New South Wales State Heritage Register in September 2003. Today, Mount Penang Parklands is a redevelopment precinct containing parks and gardens, a high school, an events park, commercial and office space and residential development.

== History ==
=== Indigenous and early colonial use ===
The area and surrounding Central Coast are the traditional lands of the Darkinjung language group of Aboriginal people. "Kariong" is said to be an Aboriginal word meaning "meeting place".

A 1994 Aboriginal sites study for the City of Gosford area included the Mount Penang site. Evidence of pre-European sites found are associated with the Hawkesbury Sandstone formations, being rock engravings, grinding groove sites and shelters with both art and occupation deposit. Common motifs found at rock engraving sites include, what appear to be kangaroos and marine animals such as whales, fish and eels. Human forms have also been recorded throughout the region. Some rock platforms contain many motifs, while other sites may only a small number of engraved figures.

European colonisation of the Gosford district began in the 1820s, with the main points of entry being Brisbane Water in the east and Mangrove Creek, a tributary of the Hawkesbury River, in the west. Most of the development subsequently occurred in the eastern or coastal sector.

Early settlement of the district can be divided into two phases:

1. The pioneering era, 1821–31, when the district's resources were exploited and little development took place.
2. The developing era, 1832–43, when considerable growth occurred in population and industry.

In the 1830s, a government township was laid out at the head of Brisbane Water, on land between Erina and Narara Creeks. It was described as the township of Port Frederick, in honour of Frederick Hely, who was Superintendent of Convicts and had a large property on Narara Creek. When the survey plan was sent to Governor Gipps for approval, it was returned with the notation "to be called Gosford".

Early industry include timber getters (forest oak, ironbark and red cedar), lime burners (from shells from the many Aboriginal middens or large natural deposits around the shores) and ship builders of Brisbane Water. This activity continued into the 20th century. Early economic activity included small farms and grazing properties. Citrus orchards were planted on farms from 1880 where timber getters had cleared the land, and climate and soils were suitable. As roads were developed, farming spread to Somersby Plateau. In 1897, the district produced 3% of NSW's citrus crop, increasing to 21% by 1921 and 34% by 1928. Market gardens and passionfruit were also increasing in popularity.

Other early townships in the district were at East Gosford, Kincumber and Blackwall (near Woy Woy), where the main shipbuilding yard was located. Until the 1880s the district's timber and other produce went to Sydney by boat, since few land routes were available.

The railway, which was completed in 1887, provided opportunities for commencement of tourist activities in the area. Large numbers of tourists used trains to travel to Woy Woy and Gosford for fishing, hunting and sight seeing trips. Guest houses were developed to accommodate this rising demand for overnight or holiday accommodation. Railway access encouraged other industries, including dairying in the districts around Wyong.

=== Juvenile Justice Centre ===
The Mount Penang Juvenile Justice Centre was the largest centre of its type in the Southern Hemisphere, accommodating 170 male juvenile offenders. The centre was set out on an open plan, with the detainees housed in dormitories and attending schooling and vocational technical training on site during the week. The principle of rehabilitation through the combination of education and physical labour is a doctrine that the centre had adopted throughout its history. Indeed, the initial building phase between 1912 and 1922 relied on the physical labour of the inmates for the construction of the centre's major buildings, many of which are still in use today.

The site maintains a link with the earliest days of juvenile reform in NSW when male offenders were housed on retired navy ships in Sydney Harbour and on work farms in the Sydney district. Some of the earliest buildings were designed to resemble lighthouse cottages, in keeping with the nautical background of the school. The centre also provides a tangible marker of the reform system for boys spanning most of the twentieth century.

==== The Nautical School Ships, 1866–1911 ====
In 1866, the Destitute Children Act, better known as the Industrial Schools Act was passed through the Parliament of New South Wales in an effort to control wayward or destitute children. The Act was initiated following the findings of an 1859 Select Committee on the condition of the working classes in Sydney. The committee estimated that there was up to 1,000 destitute children in Sydney alone, and recommended the establishment of reformatory schools to get them off the streets.

The schools were designed on Industrial Schools in England which removed children who were homeless, involved in crime or neglected in some way and place them in reformatories, separating them from the bad influences that they were under. Once "saved", the children could then be given a rudimentary education, taught the basics of a trade and be apprenticed out to start their lives as useful citizens.

A response to the 1866 Act was the establishment of the Nautical School Ships, the first of which was the Vernon. Encouraged by Henry Parkes, the then Premier of New South Wales the ex-navy sailing ship was converted into a training ship to house up to 500 boys. The Vernon was legally an Industrial School, and as such was intended to house children who had not been convicted of criminal offences, but were instead found to be destitute, neglected, or in moral danger.

No Reformatory School for young offenders, was created at the same time. As a result, it became common practice for children who were believed to have committed crimes to be sentenced by magistrates to the Vernon. The ships combined a system of education and military-style discipline, based on a reformist vision. Social philanthropists supported the principle of removing a child from a bad family environment in order to ensure the child's moral reform. From 1878 to 1895, military-style drills were introduced under the guidance of Superintendent Frederick William Neitenstein.

The days on board were divided in two, with lessons taking up one half of the day and drill taking up the other half. The boys were under constant supervision, with inspections being a means to ensure they stayed on the right path. The boys were further controlled through a class system of seven grades, with each grade carrying privileges and work routines. Boys worked on a marks system to advance to higher grades, receiving the extra privileges that went with them. By encouraging advancement, the system was designed to maintain discipline and ensure self-reliance, both seen as being essential to reform.

In 1890, the Sobraon, a second training ship built in 1866, replaced the Vernon. Both ships were anchored off Cockatoo Island in Sydney Harbour. The Sobraon remained there until 1911. Whilst moored off Cockatoo Island, the boys of the Vernon and the Sobraon maintained a small farm to supply themselves with fresh food, a tradition carried on at Mount Penang.

==== The Establishment of Mount Penang, 1912 ====
In 1905, the Neglected Children and Juvenile Offenders Act was passed to replace the former Industrial and Reformatory Schools Acts of 1866. The Gosford Farm Home for Boys was built under this new Act. In the early 1900s, the Government Surveyor recommended the Mount Penang site as a possible location for a Government sanatorium; however, this was never acted upon. During the same period, the Government looked for a site on which to construct a new centre for juvenile delinquents.

The new centre would be based on similar principles as the Brush Farm in Eastwood, where hard physical work and a basic school education would combine to assist in the rehabilitation of delinquent boys. The centre would also take the boys from the nautical training ships, which had become outdated and expensive to operate by the early 1900s.

On 1 July 1912, a party of approximately 100 boys aged between ten and sixteen began clearing a site at Mount Penang near Gosford, in order to build a new State-controlled farm for wayward boys. The farm was to replace the former Nautical School Ships and the small Brush Farm. All the boys in the working party were formerly of the Sobraon, and were supervised by the former probation officer of the Nautical School Ship, Herbert Charles Wood.

The site was situated on the lip of a reasonably flat summit of a sharp escarpment, three miles west of the town of Gosford. The site was isolated from main population centres, a requirement that had worked against the Brush Farm site at Eastwood, which had been encroached upon by residential development. It was the combination of these factors of inaccessibility and isolation that led the committee appointed to locate a new site for the training of male juvenile delinquents to choose Mount Penang for their site. This decision was also influenced by the perceived need for agricultural labourers in New South Wales, which made a rural site with agricultural potential attractive.

The chosen location of Mount Penang was one a track to Sydney, which went via Mangrove Mountain and Wisemans Ferry. Although remoteness worked in favour of the choice of the Mount Penang site for the farm, it created serious problems during the construction of the complex.

==== The Construction Phase, 1912–22 ====
Access to the proposed site at Mount Penang provided the first obstacle that needed to be overcome. The only access to the building site was via a steep track, with gradients of between 1:8 and 1:11. With all the equipment and stores being bought in by bullock, bricks were ruled out as the main building material, due to the difficulties of transportation and associated costs. From the inception of the project, a building committee was established to oversee the construction and to work through any potential difficulties. As an alternative to bricks, the Committee recommended the use of local hardwood and sandstone for the works, the latter quarried on site. The building committee architect, James Nangle, recommended the use of concrete for the buildings, to reduce cost and overcome the problem of transport.

James Nangle had worked as an architect in Sydney since 1891, being employed in the design of residential, commercial and industrial projects. His work with the Department of Public Instruction on the design of portable classrooms made him well qualified to sit on the Building Committee for Mount Penang. Nangle's association with the department was further strengthened through his teaching in the technical education branch from 1890 to the late 1930s. From 1913, he was the Superintendent of the Branch, being instrumental in its move towards a more vocationally orientated approach.

The Minister of Public Instruction approved the plans, with a budget set at £12,000 for the main structures. Work commenced on the first day of July 1912, with the boys providing the labour, another cost-cutting measure. To begin with, the boys were accommodated in military-style bell tents while they worked on the construction of their own dormitories. The boys were split into work parties under the supervision of tradesmen who could provide assistance and guidance to the boys.

The first buildings constructed were those most essential to the institution: dormitories, a dining room, staff quarters, offices, a kitchen, store rooms for supplies and equipment, and accommodation for the tradesmen and Clerk of Works. The Minister of Public Instruction laid the foundation stone of No. 1 Dormitory in December 1912. By September 1913, No. 1 Dormitory was completed, as had the Assistant Superintendent's residence and four weatherboard cottages for the married staff members. These cottages still stand along the entrance road to the complex.

The first schoolmaster at Mount Penang, George Walpole, kept a diary of his time there, which included the construction phase in 1912. Walpole noted that the concrete mix for the works was made up of three portions of crushed stone, two portions sand and one portion cement mixture, all of which was mixed by the boys before being tipped into prepared boxing or formwork to create the walls. As two groups mixed the concrete, another would convey it to the site. A fourth team lifted the boxing from the day before, up the scaffolding for the next day's operation.

In their spare time, mainly on Sundays when no construction work was undertaken, the boys developed a sports ground under Walpole's supervision, which was dedicated in 1912. The ground was developed adjacent to the building site, at the front of the dormitories, but at a lower level. To the north of the building site, a team of boys opened up a mile-long drain using a road plough, and sank a well 3.65 m (12 ft) deep to tap an underground stream for fresh water. By 1914, Mount Penang was dealing with all boy delinquents who had been institutionalised in NSW through the Children's Courts. In the Superintendent of Gosford Farm Home's Report to the Minister for Public year 1915, he set out the principle of the Farms' work ethic thus:

"Habits of steady industry are acquired, which are carried outside the boundaries of the institution and characterise the future conduct of many lads who, before, were inclined to settle down to any form of work and herein lies the secret of reformation in many cases. Boys frequently are bad, or delinquent, not from natural bent, but simply because they are lazy and have never been forced to work steadily at any occupation requiring the expenditure of a certain amount of energy."

In 1915, the Superintendent reported that a second dormitory of concrete, a concrete reservoir, a store and office had all been completed. The two dormitories were built either side of the Household block, with the officers' dwelling behind. This arrangement allowed for a suitable system in which to classify the inmates as well as providing constant supervision.

Other works on the site during this period included: the construction of a windmill to pump water from a fresh water stream below the escarpment; five galvanised tanks for water storage; a carpentry workshop, a 300-yard (270 m) trolley line for transporting the sandstone from the quarry to the site; and a bullock team and wagon, two horses, two spring carts and one dray. The buildings were all roofed with corrugated iron. During this period a permanent dam and concrete reservoir was completed, supplying the site with constant fresh water. Construction work continued at the site until 1922.

The northern, curved part of The Avenue, along which several of Mt. Penang Boys Home's main buildings are located, is thought to have been laid out c. 1912 as part of the initial detention centre development. The southern, straight part of The Avenue is thought to have been laid out slightly later, when attention turned to site landscaping. A row of brush box trees (Lophostemon confertus) was planted on each side. It appears that the road had been constructed and the trees planted by 1938. It functioned as one of two main entry ways into the site off what is now the Central Coast Highway. The Avenue is now the site's main entry drive.

The Superintendent at Mount Penang during its formative years was Frederick Stayner. Stayner began teaching in 1884, and had been appointed to the Sobraon by the Department of Public Instruction in March 1894. From the Sobraon he was transferred to the Carpentarian Reformatory at Brush Farm, Eastwood, before moving with the boys to Mount Penang in 1912. His experience and training from the two former institutions was instrumental in the development of Mount Penang.

Under Stayner's leadership, a number of significant administrative operations were implemented at the farm. The first major change was the introduction of an honour system, where extra privileges were awarded to the boys if they behaved within the guidelines set by the centre. As an incentive, the boys could shorten their time at the centre by advancing to probation based on the centre's honour system. Stayner organised the disciplinary system along a military line, and teachers carried and used canes without the direct authority of the Superintendent. The emphasis of the centre was to be on the character development of the boys as opposed to an unnecessarily harsh regime. Competitive sports were introduced, giving the inmates a sense of teamwork and providing them with a regular exercise program.

Schooling was provided to the inmates. On arrival at the centre, boys were assessed to determine what level of education they had achieved. Each boy was required to reach a fourth class standard of primary school, regardless of age. Initially, the school operated in any building, or verandas, available to them. In the first years, schooling was conducted in the converted end of the new dormitory until a school building was erected behind the main complex. The syllabus was based on the 1905 Primary Syllabus, which was supplemented after 1935 with visits from lecturers from the University of Sydney.

==== Consolidation, 1923–40 ====
In 1923, the State Government passed the Child Welfare Act, repealing and consolidating a variety of provisions that existed in legislation relating to the care and management of children under State protection. The Act was designed to place a much greater emphasis on children's health, welfare and rehabilitation under the direction of the newly created Child Welfare Department, with Walter Bethal, who had been instrumental in setting up Mount Penang, as secretary. The new Act dealt with juvenile offenders who had come through the Children's Courts up to the age of sixteen, or those between sixteen and eighteen on minor charges in the adult system. The distinction reflected the Government's recognition of the need for more lenient treatment of young people under State care, away from the harsh environment of the NSW criminal justice system. Under the new system, the Gosford Farm Home was classified as an Industrial School, with the schooling component being controlled by the Department of Education.

Between 1923 and 1940, the living conditions and amenities at the centre gradually improved. An ongoing building program ensured that the boys continued to get building experience that could be used on their release, while at the same time upgrading their present conditions. In 1936, electric lighting and a hot water system were installed, which was followed in 1937 by a refrigeration service. By the end of 1937, the centre comprised four dormitories, a recreation hall that catered for concerts and movies, a dining and kitchen block, a hospital, a bathing and sanitary block, as well as a variety of outbuildings including a dairy and accommodation for single and married staff.

Due to the relatively poor quality of the soil at Mount Penang, a farm was established on Government land at Narara, about 16 km from the centre. Here, thirty-one boys were transferred to clear the land and prepare it for cultivation. A vegetable garden at Narara provided for the requirements of both the Narara and Gosford centres. The Narara farm was closed in April 1934 following the opening of a much larger institution at Berry in the same year. All the while, pasture improvement was being undertaken at Gosford, with sufficient milk being produced for the centre's purpose. As farm training was now offered elsewhere, more emphasis was made on vocational training at Gosford from this time.

As part of this program, further interaction with the local community in Gosford was encouraged. The institution wanted to make the local community more aware of the Farm Home, thereby gaining a level of acceptance. This was to be achieved through a number of initiatives. For example, sporting teams were organised at the centre to play in the local competitions, including football, cricket and athletics, which helped promote a positive self-image in the boys and improved relations with the local community.

Further involvement came through the public use of the Recreation Hall to view the latest movies on the centre's own screen. The boys were also employed on community projects in and around Gosford. Maintenance, gardening and small construction jobs could be carried out by the boys, which helped develop a sense of civic pride and responsibility amongst the inmates.

Despite these initiatives, some problems were inevitable considering the nature of the institution. As early as 1923, an inquiry was conducted by the Children's Court into allegations of mistreatment of the boys at Mount Penang. Part of the findings of the 1923 report was that there had been undue severity in some punishments at Mount Penang, and it recommended a lessening of the use of the cane by officers working there.

A second inquiry in 1934 investigated the punishment regime more closely, and found that it was common practice for more senior boys to administer punishment on junior inmates. Until 1934, this type of punishment often went unsupervised by staff and was open to serious abuse. One example of these forms of punishment had the offender being required to fight up to five other boys, with or without gloves. The fight continued until it was deemed that offender had received sufficient punishment.

In 1925, the newly formed Main Roads Board began construction of the Pacific Highway. This work, completed in 1930, made road travel to the Gosford area much easier than previously. Further improvements, such as replacement of the Hawkesbury River car ferries with a new road bridge in 1945, led to a rapid increase in the numbers of day trippers to the Central Coast.

==== Mount Penang Training School for Boys, 1944–1960 ====
In May 1944, a new sub-institution was opened at Mount Penang by the then Minister for Education and Child Welfare, Clive Evatt. Built at an initial cost of £25,000, it was originally designed as a maximum-security sub-institution for unresponsive boys. After 1948 it became a privilege cottage, representing a shift in governmental policy in child welfare. The changes in government policies generally sought to move away from the authoritarian structures and harsh discipline that was associated with reform schools, towards a more open, family-style environment. It was an earlier example of the same kind of thinking that had led to the establishment of the Gosford Farm Home for Boys, establishing a smaller scale, more personalised type of institution.

In 1944, a new Superintendent, Vincent Heffernan, was appointed. Heffernan had been an executive officer of the National Emergency Service during the war years and bought with him a new sense of purpose for the centre. Heffernan noticed that by the mid-1940s the centre was in a dilapidated state, both physically and ideologically. The honour system that had been introduced under Stayner had deteriorated, and discipline had become more and more rigid. The pastures were in poor condition, as were the pigs and cattle. Of further concern was the state of the workshops and the schoolhouse.

Between 1944 and 1947, Heffernan set about reinvigorating the Institution; buying new equipment for the trade rooms, establishing a boot shop to supply shoes, upgrading the pastures, and raising the pigs and cows to stud standard. A new dairy and stock shed were constructed as part of the upgrade. The construction of new recreational facilities, including new playing fields, bowling greens and a tennis court, as well as extensive landscaping and planting began during this period. From the 1940s, Mount Penang began to show their livestock, winning a number of prizes at local events and the Royal Easter Show in Sydney.

In May 1948, the new Minister for Education, Bob Heffron, opened the converted detention cottage as a privilege cottage, renamed McCabe Cottage in 1976, in line with the new government thinking. The building was redecorated internally, and boys were allowed their own room. Although still supervised, the atmosphere was more relaxed than in the main centre. Adjacent to the cottage, two residences were built to house visiting families, further reinforcing the reformation ideal. McCabe Cottage represented a new level of privilege at the centre. From the opening of Mount Penang, boys had had an opportunity to improve their position at the centre by showing that they could be trusted. The remote location of McCabe Cottage from the main centre at Mount Penang reinforced the trust that the boys had gained from the Institution.

A 1950s survey of the former inmates of McCabe Cottage, found that of sixty-two boys who had passed through it, seven had been returned to the main institution, thirty-eight had been discharged and fourteen were still in residence. Only one of the discharged boys had been re-admitted and one had absconded. It seemed that the Cottage was working in the rehabilitation of the boys and helping them make a successful adjustment to life in the community. In 1976, McCabe cottage became a Pre-discharge Unit for the Justice Centre.

In 1946, the name of the Institution was changed from The Farm Home for Boys, Gosford, to Mount Penang Training School for Boys, Gosford. The reason behind the name change was that the new name more clearly represented the idea that a varied program of planned training was required for the re-education and rehabilitation of delinquent youth. The application of the name "Mount Penang" was favoured over some of the other established names for the area, such as Kariong, as it had not been applied to any other institution or building.

Since the 1940s the greatest development in Gosford has been the growth of urbanisation in the eastern sector, brought about by road and rail improvements, an upsurge in secondary industries and State planning policies which see Gosford as part of an expanding Sydney region. In recent times, the expansion of metropolitan Sydney, the availability of private and public transport and improved road systems have combined to change the development of Gosford from a rural community prior to World War II, to that of a city containing some secondary and service industries related to the tourist trade. Agriculture and horticulture continue in the mountain areas, but are in declining importance to employment and production.

==== 1960–2000 ====
In the 1960s, five new buildings were erected behind the administration building, and a new sports ground was built. The new buildings housed an assembly hall, a gymnasium, a new kitchen/dining room, a laundry and boiler house and a storeroom. The sports ground was defined on its northern boundary by this new collection of buildings.

After 1970, gaps with dead or removed trees were not filled along the avenue. Several trees were removed in the avenue's south, with road widening, creation of the link road to Old Mount Penang Road to the east, driveways for the fire station etc.

In 1975, the new Superintendent of Mount Penang, Laurie Maher, implemented a building program aimed at improving the centre itself, as well as the morale of the boys and staff. The first project in 1975 was internal modifications to the dormitories, with new and upgraded bathroom and toilet facilities being installed, providing more privacy for the boys. In 1975, a storeroom within the administration block was converted into a holding room.

In the late 1970s and early 1980s, as well as renovations, a number of new buildings were constructed on the site. A new Officer's Dining Room was built in 1976 adjacent to the boys' dining rooms. In 1978, a new office block was built, which included offices for the Superintendent, Deputy Superintendents, Salary Officer, a police interview room, a conference room and general office. A new hospital block and nurses quarters, to replace the original 1920s hospital, was built during this phase, as was a new store and amenities building to the north of the gymnasium.

In 1978, a 50m swimming pool was added to the recreational facilities at Mount Penang, constructed on the site of a disused bowling green. The former clubhouse associated with the bowling green then converted to a teacher's staffroom.

In 1980, the school program was returned to the Education Department, after having been controlled by the Child Welfare Department since 1953. A number of new programs were introduced into the school at this time, including a new program for boys who rebelled against the traditional methods and a remedial program for one-on-one teaching. In 1991, the school program was updated to a secondary level, having operated at a primary level since its beginning. Further to these changes, the school's name was changed to "Girrakool". It had been found that former inmates were reluctant to use certificates which had Mount Penang inscribed on them due to the attached stigma. The new name eliminated this concern. The school itself was now a collection of demountable schoolrooms, with the two original buildings serving as a library and cultural centre.

A large proportion of the detainees at Mount Penang, often the majority, were men and boys of Aboriginal identity. This is not always clear in the documentary evidence of the history of the place, but it remains a vivid recollection of former detainees and their families. The centre was also often used as a place for immediately housing Aboriginal children removed from their families before they were assigned and relocated to other institutions.

Because of this, Mount Penang has close associations with the Kinchela Boys Home. The distinctively Aboriginal history of the Centre reflects the changing methods used to try to control the state's Aboriginal population, the very limited socio-economic roles allowed to Aboriginal people within the broader community, and the changing philosophies of managing a dispossessed people during the course of the 20th century.

In 1990, the centre's Vocational Training Unit was relocated to a former Roads & Traffic Authority (RTA) depot on the western extreme of the site. In 1991, the Kariong Juvenile Justice Centre was opened. In 1999, the Frank Baxter Detention Centre opened. This Juvenile Justice Centre was a purpose-built high security centre for those detainees with a history of escape or who had proved to be difficult to control in other centres, as well as those who had committed more serious offences on one edge of the former site.

In 2009, arson led to the loss of the former Paint Shop in the western precinct. It was reported at this time that other buildings in the western precinct were in a neglected state.

In 2015, the remaining correctional facility, then known as the Kariong Juvenile Correctional Centre, closed.

=== Redevelopment post-2000 ===
==== Mount Penang Gardens (2003) ====
Mount Penang Gardens in 2003, becoming a tourist attraction on the Central Coast. Designed by Anton James of JMD (James, Mather Delaney) landscape architects. The gardens comprise 12 themed gardens feature a variety of permanent and changeable garden areas modelled around a cascading water fountain, bottle trees (Brachychiton rupestris) from Queensland, an obelisk water feature and an outdoor amphitheatre. The amphitheatre is an event space. Around it are the Bottle Tree Garden, Puddle Garden, Rock Garden and Display Garden, which are available for hire for events.

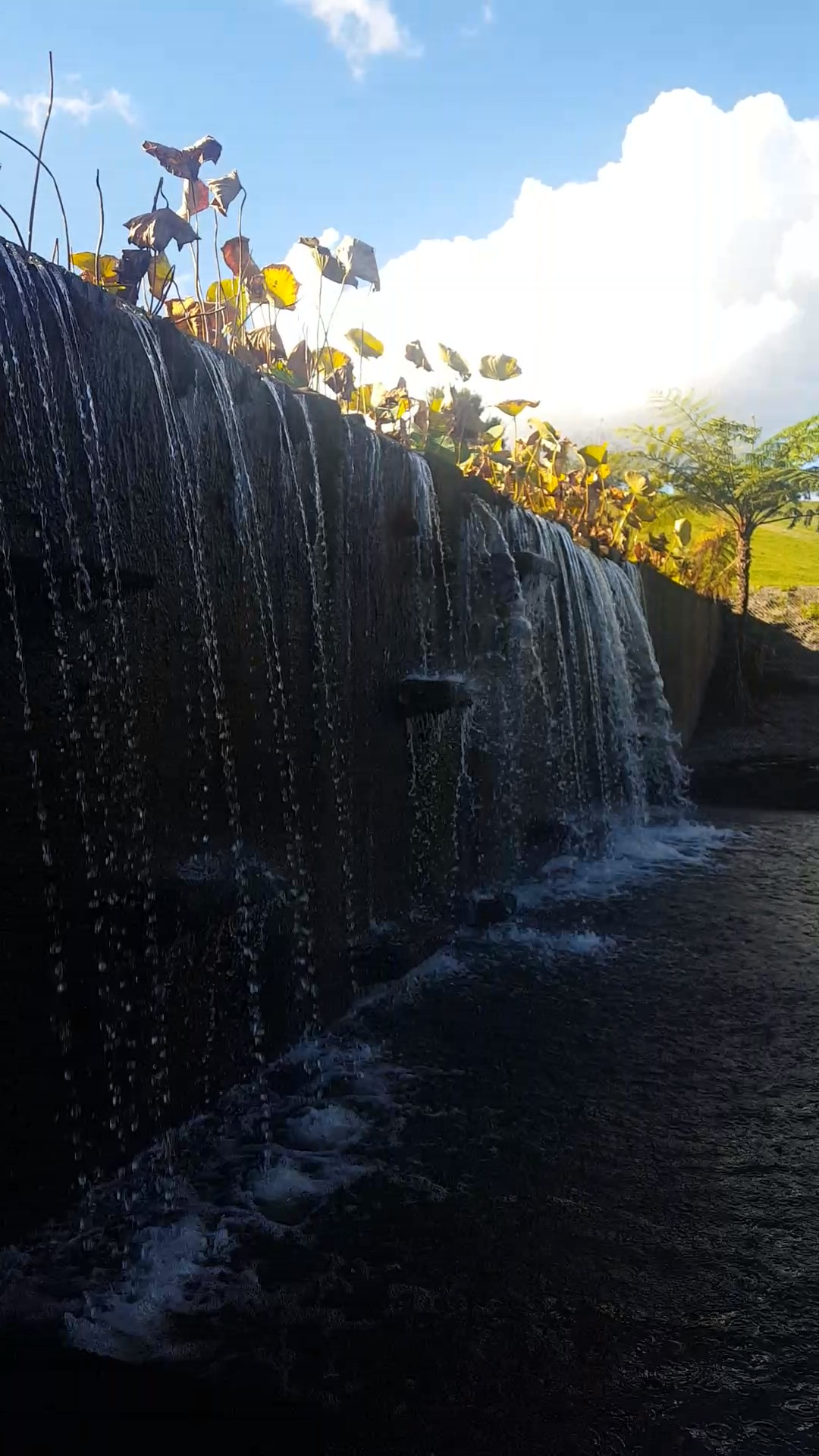
Waterfall, Mt. Penang Gardens

Themed gardens include the Pond Garden; Entry Garden; Heath Mounds; Misty Mountains; Bamboo/Grass Gardens; Colour Field Garden; Bottle Tree Garden; Display Garden; Gondwana Garden; Rock Garden; Drylands/Arid Garden; Dragon Garden; Little Oasis; Grass/Sedge Garden; Cascade Garden and Puddle Garden. Fissure gardens feature specialised plants: Pandanus or screw pines; rainforest; lithophytes (rock-dwellers) and epiphytes (tree-dwellers); Barefoot/fissure and Wind fissure. Water Gardens including the Lower Pond and the water cascades feeding it. Landmarks include an Obelisk, Queensland bottle trees and Wondabyne sculptures (see below).

==== Sculpture installations in Mt. Penang Gardens (2004) ====
Wondabyne Quarry was the source of a fine-gained Hawkesbury sandstone used to create some 20 sculptures in the Wondabyne 1 and Wondabyne 2 international sculpture symposia conducted on the banks of the Hawkesbury River in 1986. 12 of these sculptures since 2004 have stood in the sculpture garden on the banks of Mt Penang Parklands' upper lake. The others are towards the Baxter and Kariong Detention Centres on the Parklands' northeast boundary. The sculptures were positioned as per the plan of artist, Bruce Copping, above the upper lake in the Botanic Gardens.

The International Sculpture Symposium movement was spearheaded by Karl Prantl in Austria in 1959. The first international sculpture symposium took place in an abandoned stone quarry in St. Margarethan, Austria. Sculptors from around the world joined to produce a permanent public artwork from local stone, a dynamic which would provide the model for many symposia to follow. Since then international sculpture symposia have been held in numerous towns and cities around the world, including Lindabrunn, Austria and Hagi, Japan, a town known for its pottery.

The first Sculpture Symposium in Australia was held at Wondabyne near Gosford in New South Wales in 1986. Wondabyne is well known for its history of stone quarrying. The Wondabyne rail stop was named after Mt Wondabyne, located adjacent to the station across the bay, known as Mullet River or Mullet Creek. It was originally built in 1889 for quarry use only and known as Mullet Creek Station. It was later renamed Hawkesbury Cabin station, then finally Wondabyne. The stone for the Wondabyne Sculptures was sourced from the Wondabyne Quarry which is now owned by Gosford Quarries.

The Wondabyne Sculpture Symposium held in 1986, featured sandstone sculptures by Bruce Copping and 11 other sculptors from 6 nations. The symposia was undertaken along the foreshore area near the railway stop at Wondabyne. In 1994, Gosford Council decided that it was in the best interest of public to relocate these sculptures due to access and liability issues at the original site. It was then decided the more desirable and accessible site was the new Mt Penang Parklands. The cache is hidden in the bushland area of the park and is a stone's throw from the Wondabyne Stone Sculptures.

==== National Aboriginal and Islander Dance Association HQ and commercial development (2007) ====
In February 2007, NAISDA, the National Indigenous Dance College, opened their new premises at Mt. Penang Festival Parklands site. In 2007, approval was given to build a Parklands Post Office, Family Tavern, Brewery & Hunter Wines Promotion Centre on The Avenue.

==== Kariong High School (2008) ====
In 2008, approval was given for construction of a new Kariong High School and landscaping in the parkland's south, facing the Pacific Highway. With approval for the high school on the former Events Park site, the Festival Development Corporation needed to re-establish the events function elsewhere on the site. In 2009, approval was given for two event park stages proposed (1) for the 2009 Flora Festival in September; (2) for a permanent events park layout further north and inside the Parklands site, away from the highway.

==== Mount Penang Event Park ====
Central Coast Region Development Corporation (CCRDC) owns the Mount Penang Parklands and is charged with securing ongoing management of public open spaces and community facilities at Mt. Penang, protecting and enhancing the broad Mt. Penang Parkland precinct including its remnant bushland and habitat areas. CCRDC gained a $45,000 grant from the NSW Government, through the Destination NSW 2011/12 "Regional Tourism Product Development Program" to electrify the Mount Penang Event Park.

The infrastructure project cost $61,000 and will enable new business opportunities, support and enhance regional tourism. Installation of permanent electrical services was effected between March and September 2013. The Corporation expects to attract a variety of new major events, and provide enhanced services to existing event organisers. Capable of accommodating up to 25,000 people, the Mount Penang Event Park is a prime location for events on the Central Coast.

== Description ==
Mount Penang Parklands is located west of the sandstone plateau of Penang Mountain. The area and surrounding Central Coast are the traditional lands of the Darkinjung language group of Aboriginal people. "Kariong" is said to be an Aboriginal word meaning "meeting place". Archaeological excavations on Mt. Penang have revealed evidence of cultural Aboriginal sites associated with Hawkesbury sandstone plateaux, such as rock engravings, grinding groove sites and shelters. Common motifs found at rock engraving sites include kangaroos, whales, fish and eels.

The Kariong area features temperate rainforest. Trees in the Mt. Penang Parklands vicinity support hollow-dependent native fauna species including nocturnal mammals such as possums and gliders, microbats and some bird species such as parrots, cockatoos and wood ducks. Mature native trees would have been logged in the area in the 19th century.

For most of the 20th century, the site of the Mt. Penang Parklands was part of a much larger area that accommodated an institution for the care, control and rehabilitation of delinquent and destitute boys. It is now being redeveloped by the NSW Government. The Parklands are made up of six key areas: Event Park, Retail/Commercial Park, Mt Penang Gardens, Sports Park, Future Business Park and Bushland.

The landscape characteristics of the site derive from its bushland setting, originally separated from suburban development; its location on a broad, ridgetop plateau with gentle slopes suitable for farming; availability of water supply through its central drainage swale and underground stream; the curving configuration of the eastern side of the ridge, with its steep rock benches downslope, creating a broad, amphitheatre effect; the excellent views outwards from the site from northeast, through east, to southwest; the diverse but pleasant views across and within the site created by the curving roadway, the spines of old buildings, the man-made dam and the grazing paddocks; the pastoral, almost Arcadian, rural landscape with old buildings and mature trees; direct access to an almost intact Hawkesbury sandstone plant community, with a good range of shrubs and herbaceous plants as understorey; he boundary or perimeter plantings of mature pines, poplars, coral trees and brush box; the remnant stands or scattered specimens of ancient scribly gums; the unexpected, but pleasant, informal "courtyards" created by the progressive placement of buildings over time; and the spaciousness around the buildings created by the numerous playing fields.

The original buildings and most of the buildings that followed have been designed by the Government Architect, operating through the Department of Public Works and Services. A member of the original building committee was the prominent architect, James Nangle, who also proved influential during the design and construction of the buildings.

The first buildings were designed so that the inmates could build them under the supervision of skilled artisans and tradesmen. The steep escarpment made the transport of building materials very expensive and James Nangle chose site-mixed concrete, using cement, sand and crushed sandstone as an economy measure. The sand may have been made from finely crushed sandstone. The concrete does not appear to have been reinforced and was poured in shallow timber forms, lifted in stages. Other materials used were timber and corrugated iron, with the majority of the early staff cottages null of weatherboard.

The first dormitories and administrative buildings were constructed in the colonial era, with wide verandas, steeply pitched roofs and regular punctuation of windows and door openings. Plan forms were simple rectangles. The houses were bungalows with a similar character.

The later houses are of mass concrete and show a superimposed Federation influence. These were introduced between the Colonial houses so that the styles alternated.

Later buildings used brick as the principal building material, but continued to utilise the same simple shapes and motifs and, even though built over several decades, were very consistent within themselves and blended with the earlier structures. The 1980s buildings, which are located between re residences and the dormitories, utilised the same elements as the original Colonial buildings and serve as an important visual and physical link between the dormitories running along the ridge and the "Carinya" dormitory and the maintenance building further to the west.

Whilst many of the education buildings, which are standard Department of Education demountable classrooms, depart from the themes outlined above, they are generally placed in discrete groups which are screened from the main buildings by vegetation.

All buildings are single-storeyed, giving the site a low and spread out appearance. Ornamentation is almost totally lacking on all the buildings, which therefore rely on form and play of light and shade for total effect. Further unity is provided by the grouping of buildings by function, which is both an operational characteristic and a response to the topography.

The McCabe Cottage complex is an architectural departure from the other buildings on the site. It is seated on the opposite side of the site and both the main building and the two detached cottages are excellent examples of 1940s Functionalist architecture. The contrast of this highly contrived architectural style with the main complex is dramatic but is moderated by its remote location, such that it stands as a separate entity.

The farm buildings are also departures from the mainstream buildings. Of these, the barn is an excellent example of organic vernacular architecture, utilising the same characteristic mass concrete material as the main buildings. The others are utilitarian structures that follow modular construction patterns. The siting of the buildings in their farm paddock setting gives them considerable importance in the landscape.

Dating of items is difficult, firstly because of the lack of accurately dated site plans showing the built elements at any given point in time and, secondly, because of the lack of adherence to recognised architectural styles of the various periods, with the exception of the McCabe Cottage complex. It appears that construction on the site was not an ongoing continuous process but, rather, several buildings were constructed at a time and were separated from previous and following periods of construction by many years. This pattern could be explained by availability of funding.

Mount Penang remains intact enough to demonstrate the evolution of juvenile justice systems in 20th century NSW.

== Heritage listing ==
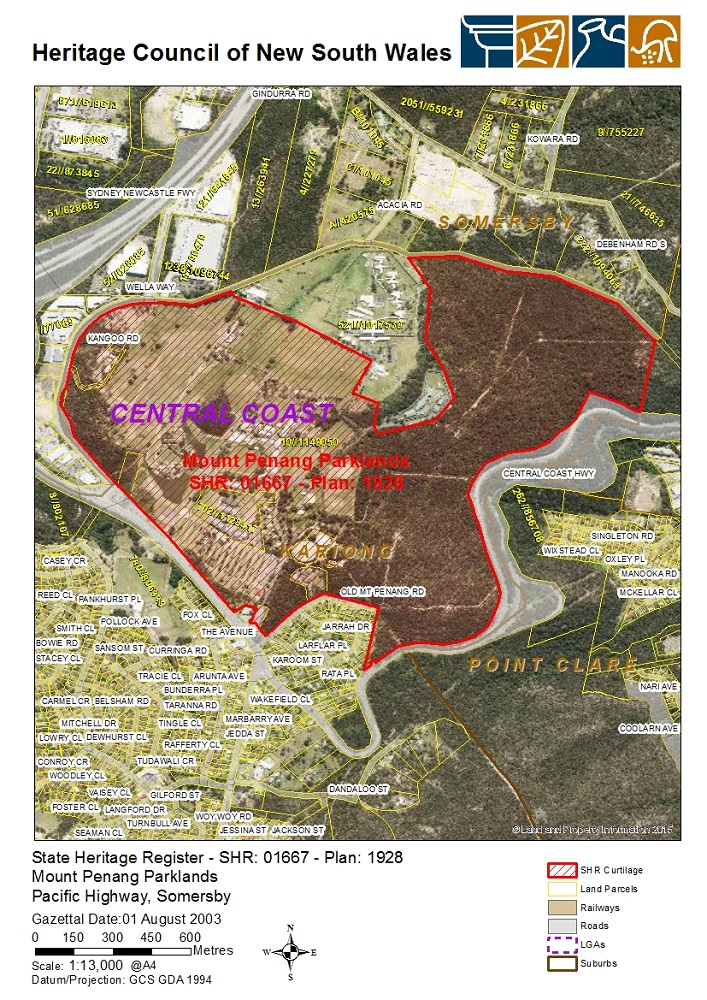
Heritage boundaries

The Mount Penang Juvenile Justice Centre has been the most important juvenile detention centre in NSW for most of the twentieth century and is a direct continuation of the nineteenth-century system of reformatory training ships. The design of the early buildings, their configuration and the layout of the site itself, as well as its agricultural and pastoral features, its remnant dairy and its landscaping collectively and individually illustrate juvenile penal philosophies and practices of the period and their subsequent evolution over eighty-five years of operation. The location of the centre is a feature in the historical expansion of the city of Sydney into its rural hinterland and its operations are an element in the development of Gosford and the Central Coast.

Mount Penang also has significance for the local Aboriginal people both pre and post-contact, and during the time when Mt Penang was used as a juvenile detention centre and accommodated a number of Aboriginal detainees for whom the site would have profound associations.

The centre has notable aesthetic qualities associated with its site and the available views, and layout of the low-scale buildings and the landscaping. The earlier buildings are attractive, human-scaled structures, which, while of an institutional character, utilise colonial homestead architecture appropriate to their setting and construction techniques of particular interest. The earlier buildings reproduce these forms to reinforce the characteristic appearance of the complex, whilst the McCabe Cottages group is an excellent example of the Inter-War Functionalist architectural style.

The siting and relationship of buildings to each other and to the sports fields, paddocks and vistas are all components of the operational requirements and practices of the centre. These provide technical information regarding juvenile detention and reformatory practices. Mount Penang is very important to the many boys and young men who were detained there over the course of nearly a century. For most detainees, Mt Penang is a place where the unforgettable occurred – experiences that strongly influenced the course of their lives.

The place is significant to the many men and women who lived and worked at the former detention centre. For many of these people, it is a place of substantial personal and professional achievement. Mt Penang is also important to the local community as a landmark of historical and aesthetic importance. The place has functioned as a community meeting point, with many links between the wider community and the detainees and staff.

Mount Penang Juvenile Justice Centre was listed on the New South Wales State Heritage Register on 19 September 2003 having satisfied the relevant criteria.
