= Central Coast massacre =

Spree shooting by Malcolm George Baker

- Location: Central Coast, New South Wales, Australia
- Date: 27 October 1992; 9:12 p.m. – 10 p.m.
- Attack type: Mass murder, spree shooting
- Weapon: Sawed-off Remington 12-gauge double-barrelled shotgun
- Deaths: 6
- Injuries: 1
- Perpetrator: Malcolm George Baker

The Central Coast massacre was a shooting spree killing that occurred on the evening of 27 October 1992 on the Central Coast, New South Wales, Australia when 45-year-old motor mechanic Malcolm Baker killed six people and an unborn child, and injured one other person. On 6 August 1993, Baker was sentenced to life imprisonment for each of the six murders.

== Background ==
Baker had dated one of his victims, 23-year-old Kerry Gannon, for several years. She broke off the relationship about six weeks before the shootings. It was reported that a court had ordered Baker not to contact Gannon after their break up. Channel Nine television reported that authorities had revoked Baker's weapons permit and confiscated a cache of weapons from him weeks prior after he allegedly harassed Gannon.

== Shootings ==
The shootings started at 9:12 p.m. at the Terrigal apartment shared by Kerry Gannon and her 18-year-old sister Lisa Gannon, who was pregnant. Both were shot dead and their bodies were discovered inside the apartment. Their father, Thomas Gannon, 43, who had been visiting for a few days, was found dead in the street. Twenty-two-year-old Christopher Gall, a friend of the sisters, was severely injured, suffering a gunshot wound to the face.

Baker then drove to Bateau Bay, where he arrived about ten minutes later, and shot dead his 27-year-old son David. His body was discovered in the back yard of the home he shared with his wife and baby.

Baker then went to a house in Wyong, 15 kilometres north of Bateau Bay. Arriving there shortly before 10 p.m., he shot dead Ross Smith, 35, and critically injured Leslie Read, 25, at the home they shared. Read died two hours later in hospital. Smith and Baker had had a confrontation about two years prior, over a business deal gone sour.

Lisa Gannon was due to give birth to her child in December. Efforts to save her baby failed.

At 11.00 p.m., Baker walked into a police station, surrendered, and handed over a sawn-off Remington 12-gauge double-barrelled shotgun. Baker was charged with six counts of murder and one count of attempted murder.

Baker was sentenced to life imprisonment in 1993. He died in jail on 22 June 2024, at the age of 76.
