= Coast Shelter =

Australian non-profit organisation

- Central Coast Emergency Accommodation Services Ltd.
- Predecessor: Rumbalara Youth Refuge
- Formation: 1992; 34 years ago
- VAT ID no.: ABN 46 095 999 287
- Purpose: Homelessness and domestic and family violence
- Headquarters: Gosford
- Region served: Central Coast, New South Wales
- Services: Accommodation and support for people experiencing homelessness or domestic & family violence
- Interim CEO: Lee Shearer
- Budget: Revenue of $1 million or more
- Website: coastshelter.org.au
- Formerly called: Gosford Emergency Accommodation Services

Coast Shelter (registered as Central Coast Emergency Accommodation Services Ltd.) is a non-profit organisation supporting homeless young people, adults and women and children experiencing domestic & family violence in the Central Coast region of New South Wales, Australia. Coast Shelter is the largest regional Specialist Homelessness Service in NSW and provides a range of accommodation and other services to those experiencing hardship in the local community.

The organisation was founded in 1992 as Gosford Emergency Accommodation Services. The service's predecessor was the Rumbalara Youth Refuge established by Gosford City Council in 1985. Since its founding, the organisation has assisted over 16,000 individuals.

== History ==
Coast Shelter started operations from the site of the Rumbalara Youth Refuge in Gosford, New South Wales. Rumbalara was built by Gosford City Council in 1985 and had a dual purpose: four beds were for homeless youth and two beds were for students who were able to return home on weekends. Council also ran a service for homeless adults in a separate council property. In December 1991, funding cuts led the council to close the service, however Laurie Maher approached Jim Grainger of the Catholic Church's Centacare Broken Bay to take over operation of the site. The move was approved by the New South Wales Department of Family and Community Services. In 1992, Maher established the new organisation, Gosford Emergency Accommodation Services.

Over the years, the organisation auspiced other crisis accommodation services in the Central Coast region and were commissioned to run additional services. Today, Coast Shelter operates nine crisis accommodation services, two community centres, and provides other forms of support for people experiencing or at risk of homelessness or domestic & family violence.

The NSW Government's "Going Home Staying Home" reforms in 2014-15 dramatically altered the funding and operation of crisis accommodation services across the State and led to significant changes within the organisation. Ultimately, Coast Shelter secured the management of the majority of its sites along with additional crisis accommodation services in the region.

== See also ==
- Homelessness in Australia
- Yfoundations
