= Long Bay Correctional Centre =

Building in Sydney, Australia

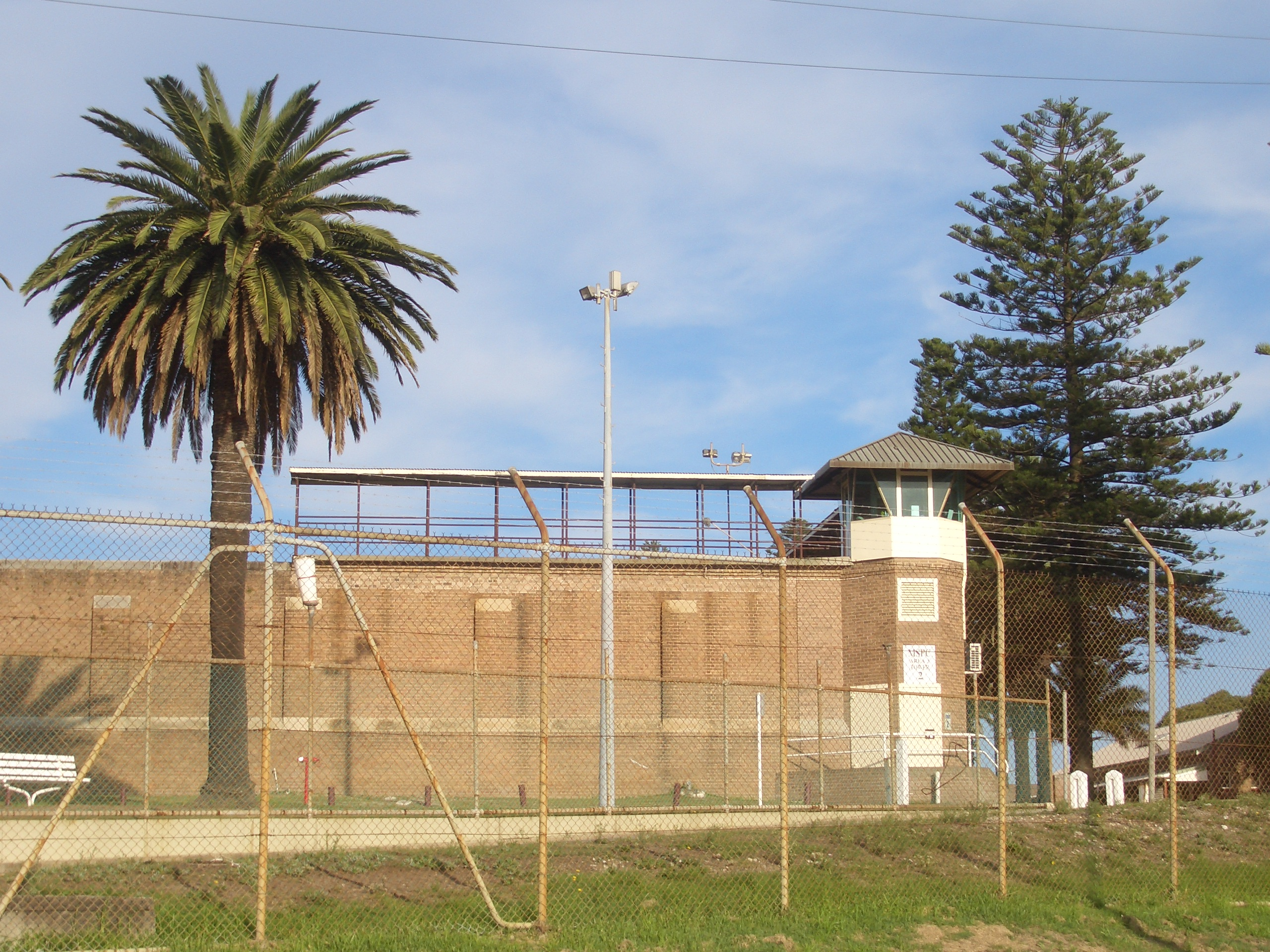
- A watchtower on the correctional centre north-western perimeter wall
- Interactive map of Long Bay Correctional Centre
- Location: Malabar, New South Wales; 33°58′10″S 151°14′45″E
- Status: Operational
- Security class: Maximum, minimum (males)
- Capacity: As of 2016, 1,200 inmates: 130 LBH (hospital); xxx MSPC (special programs); 65 SPC (protection unit)
- Opened: August 1909 (State Reformatory for Women); 1 June 1914 (State Penitentiary for Men)
- Managed by: Corrective Services NSW
- Website: Long Bay Correctional Centre
- Building details

Technical details
- Material: Sandstone and brick

Design and construction
- Architect: Walter Liberty Vernon
- Architecture firm: Colonial Architect of New South Wales

New South Wales Heritage Register
- Official name: Long Bay Correctional Centre; Long Bay Gaol; Long Bay Jail; Long Bay Industrial Correctional Centre; Assessment Prison
- Type: State heritage (complex / group)
- Designated: 2 April 1999
- Reference no.: 810
- Type: Gaol/lock-up
- Category: Law enforcement
- Builders: Public Works Department

The Long Bay Correctional Complex, commonly called Long Bay, is a correctional facility comprising a heritage-listed maximum and minimum security prison for males and females and a hospital to treat prisoners, psychiatric cases and remandees. The complex is located in Malabar, New South Wales, Australia and is approximately 14 kilometres (8.7 mi) south of the Sydney CBD. It is contained within a 32-hectare (79-acre) site. The facility is operated by Corrective Services New South Wales, a department administered by the Government of New South Wales.

The Complex accepts sentenced and unsentenced prisoners under New South Wales and/or Commonwealth legislation and comprises three separate facilities including the Long Bay Hospital (a maximum security institution for medical and psychiatric cases); the Metropolitan Special Programs Centre (a maximum/minimum security institution); and the Special Purpose Centre (a maximum security institution for inmates requiring special protection).

Designed by Walter Liberty Vernon, the complex is listed on the New South Wales State Heritage Register. The prisons' yards are built in a panopticon style.

== History ==
=== Indigenous history ===
Before the 1780s, local Aboriginal people in the area used the site for fishing and cultural activities - rock engravings, grinding grooves and middens remain in evidence. In 1789, Governor Philip referred to "a long bay", which became known as Long Bay. Aboriginal people are believed to have inhabited the Sydney region for at least 20,000 years. The population of Aboriginal people between Palm Beach and Botany Bay in 1788 has been estimated to have been 1500. Those living south of Port Jackson to Botany Bay were the Cadigal people who spoke Dharug, while the local clan name of Maroubra people was "Muru-ora-dial". By the mid-nineteenth century the traditional owners of this land had typically either moved inland in search of food and shelter, or had died as the result of European disease or confrontation with British colonisers.

=== Colonial history ===
One of the earliest land grants in this area was made in 1824 to Captain Francis Marsh, who received 4.9 hectares (12 acres) bounded by the present Botany and High Streets, Alison and Belmore Roads. In 1839 William Newcombe acquired the land north-west of the present town hall in Avoca Street.

Randwick takes its name from the town of Randwick, Gloucestershire, England. The name was suggested by Simeon Pearce (1821–86) and his brother James. Simeon was born in the English Randwick and the brothers were responsible for the early development of both Randwick and its neighbour, Coogee. Simeon had come to the colony in 1841 as a 21 year old surveyor. He built his Blenheim House on the 1.6 hectares (4 acres) he bought from Marsh, and called his property "Randwick". The brothers bought and sold land profitably in the area and elsewhere. Simeon campaigned for construction of a road from the city to Coogee (achieved in 1853) and promoted the incorporation of the suburb. Pearce sought construction of a church modelled on the church of St. John in his birthplace. In 1857 the first St Jude's stood on the site of the present post office, at the corner of the present Alison Road and Avoca Street.

Randwick was slow to progress. The village was isolated from Sydney by swamps and sandhills, and although a horse-drawn omnibus was operated by a man named Grice from the late 1850s, the journey was more a test of nerves than a pleasure jaunt. Wind blew sand over the track, and the bus sometimes became bogged, so that passengers had to get out and push it free. From its early days Randwick had a divided society. The wealthy lived elegantly in large houses built when Pearce promoted Randwick and Coogee as a fashionable area. But the market gardens, orchards and piggeries that continued alongside the large estates were the lot of the working class. Even on the later estates that became racing empires, many jockeys and stablehands lived in huts or even under canvas. An even poorer group were the immigrants who existed on the periphery of Randwick in a place called Irishtown, in the area now known as The Spot, around the junction of St. Paul's Street and Perouse Road. Here families lived in makeshift houses, taking on the most menial tasks in their struggle to survive.

In 1858 when the NSW Government passed the Municipalities Act, enabling formation of municipal districts empowered to collect rates and borrow money to improve their suburb, Randwick was the first suburb to apply for the status of a municipality. It was approved in February 1859, and its first council was elected in March 1859.

Randwick had been the venue for sporting events, as well as duels and illegal sports, from the early days in the colony's history. Its first racecourse, the Sandy Racecourse or Old Sand Track, had been a hazardous track over hills and gullies since 1860. When a move was made in 1863 by John Tait, to establish Randwick Racecourse, Simeon Pearce was furious, especially when he heard that Tait also intended to move into Byron Lodge. Tait's venture prospered, however, and he became the first person in Australia to organise racing as a commercial sport. The racecourse made a big difference to the progress of Randwick. The omnibus gave way to trams that linked the suburb to Sydney and civilisation. Randwick soon became a prosperous and lively place, and it still retains a busy residential, professional and commercial life.

Today, some of the houses have been replaced by home units. Many European migrants have made their homes in the area, along with students and workers at the nearby University of NSW and the Prince of Wales Hospital.

=== Long Bay Gaol history ===
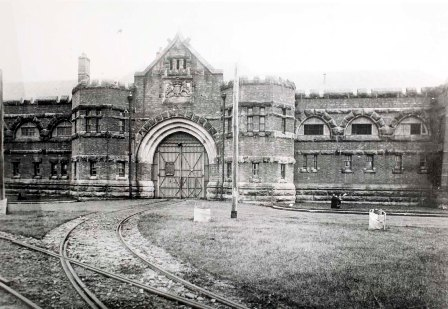
Long Bay Gaol, c. 1900

Long Bay was opened due to the imminent closure of Darlinghurst Gaol. The State Reformatory for Women was opened in 1909 and the State Penitentiary for Men was opened beside it in 1914. Gallows were in operation at the complex from 1917 to 1939. The reformatory became part of the prison in the late 1950s, known as the Long Bay Penitentiary. After the Silverwater Women's Correctional Centre (formerly known as Mulawa) was opened in 1970, the women's prison was vacated and converted into a medium security prison for men.

A report on prison reform released in 1946 found overcrowding at Long Bay. It recommended that sewerage replace pan systems in major gaols and that prisoners should have two more hours each day out of their cells.

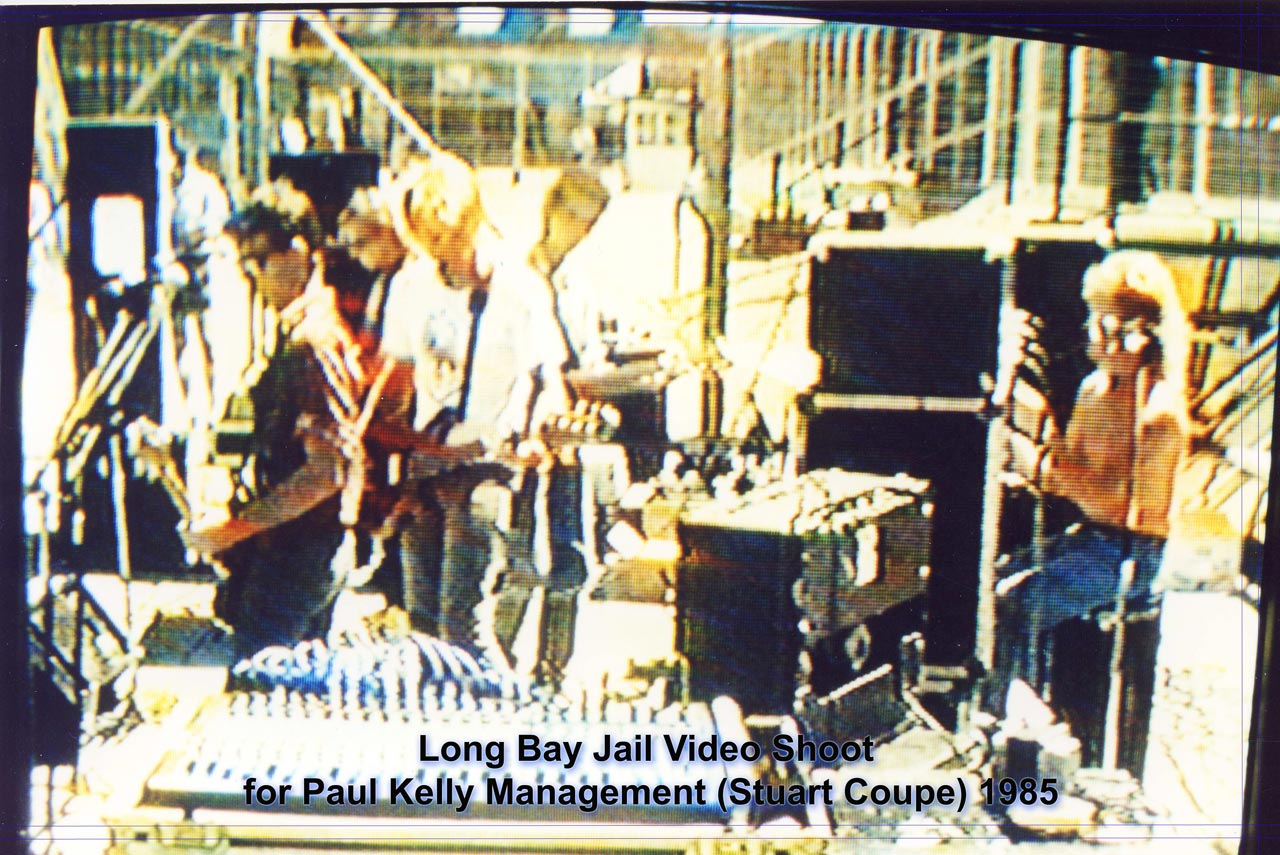
Paul Kelly & the Coloured Girls, Long Bay Gaol, Christmas Eve, 1985

On Christmas Eve (24 December) 1985, Australian musician Paul Kelly performed at Long Bay.

A significant public health case arose in July 1990 when a mentally ill, HIV-positive prisoner was being escorted in the exercise yard. The prisoner took a syringe filled with his blood and stabbed a probationary prison officer. The prison officer was diagnosed with the virus five weeks later and died in 1997, aged 28.

In the late 1990s the facility was redeveloped to offer special treatment units which offer programs for sex offenders; those with intellectual disabilities; drug and alcohol abuse; or the use of violence.

Australian serial killer Ivan Milat spent the rest of his life in prison at Long Bay until his death on 27 October 2019.

=== Katingal facility ===
In 1975, a prominent supermax prison block was completed, known as Katingal. It was constructed to house prisoners classified by Corrective Services as 'intractable', replacing the intractable section at Grafton Gaol, though also ended up being used to house prisoners on protection, something it was not originally designed for. A high level of secrecy surrounded the design of the prison, and the Corrective Services Advisory Council, a group formed to advise the Minister of Corrections on matters concerning prisons, criticised the fact they were not advised about the construction until it was too late to make substantial changes. No psychologists, psychiatrists or medical staff were consulted in planning the facility, and the fact it did not have any medical facilities was considered a deficiency.

It was considered to be inescapable and dubbed as an "electronic zoo" by prisoners due to its electronically controlled confinement with artificial lights and air, depriving inmates from almost all contact from the outside world. The facility with its 40 prison cells had electronically operated doors, accompanied by several surveillance cameras, which were to supplement the existent security facilities within the unit. The unit had no natural light or windows, and was serviced by an air-conditioning system. Two yards were constructed, one for exercise and one considered a workshop, which were "small, elevated and [had] high concrete walls on all sides". The workshop was too small for any work or industry, and the prison offered no work or meaningful programs. Several "blind spots" that were not corrected during the initial design and construction of the facility led to a single escape by inmate, Russell "Mad Dog" Cox, an armed robber and hostage-taker, who escaped after cutting through a bar on the roof of one of the exercise yards. He remained on the run for 11 years.

The facility became the centre of mainly critical media attention, and was heavily criticised by Justice John Nagle during proceedings of the Nagle Royal Commission (1976–1978) who recommended its immediate closure. The recommendation that Katingal be closed was accepted, but only after a campaign lasting months.

On 17 March 1989, Michael Yabsley, Minister for Corrective Services, announced that Katingal would be reopened as a correctional facility. When it was realised that the redevelopment of the site would cost double the A$8 million allocated, plans were put on hold until a feasibility study was completed on the entire Long Bay prison complex. Demolition of Katingal began in March 2006.

== Description ==
The former male penitentiary comprised six two-storey cell wings, a debtors' prison, workshop, hospital and observation ward, all arranged around three sides of the complex with a "sterile zone" between them and the perimeter wall. The kitchen block stood in the centre facing the entrance block. The Penitentiary incorporated 352 single cells of size 3.96x2.13m and three punishment cells.

Four of the six wings had back-to-back cells opening directly to the outdoors.

The same palette of materials was used by Vernon throughout the dual prison establishment. Walls are predominantly of brick, good quality "commons" of a drab brown colour, with plain or rusticated sandstone dressing around windows and doors, and roofs of corrugated iron.

The exception is the entrance block, which evokes a medieval castle gatehouse in Federation Gothic style. Technological advances such as electric lighting, reinforced concrete floors and the new tramway were made full use of in the design.

=== Condition ===
As at 8 November 2000, most of the external brickwork of the cell wings have been painted and unsympathetic alterations and additions have occurred over the years. However, most of the original construction remains intact. All buildings appear to be in good condition.

=== Modifications and dates ===
The workshop, kitchen and observation ward have been demolished and the back-to-back cell wings have been disused for some time.

- c. 1920s the penitentiary was reported as overcrowded, receiving 70% of all gaol entries and functioning as a remand centre. The overflow was accommodated by timber huts erected between the male and female prisons, and part of the women's prison in 1945.
- 1962 penitentiary absorbed the old reformatory.
- 1978 observation ward demolished. Christmas Day 1978, workshops were burnt down during a riot.
- 1993 after a series of name changes, the penitentiary, together with the former reformatory, was renamed Reception and Industrial Centre.
- 2008 forensic hospital established outside the prison wall on western "corner" of site. The pharmacy was established in the ground floor of this hospital.

== Current divisions ==
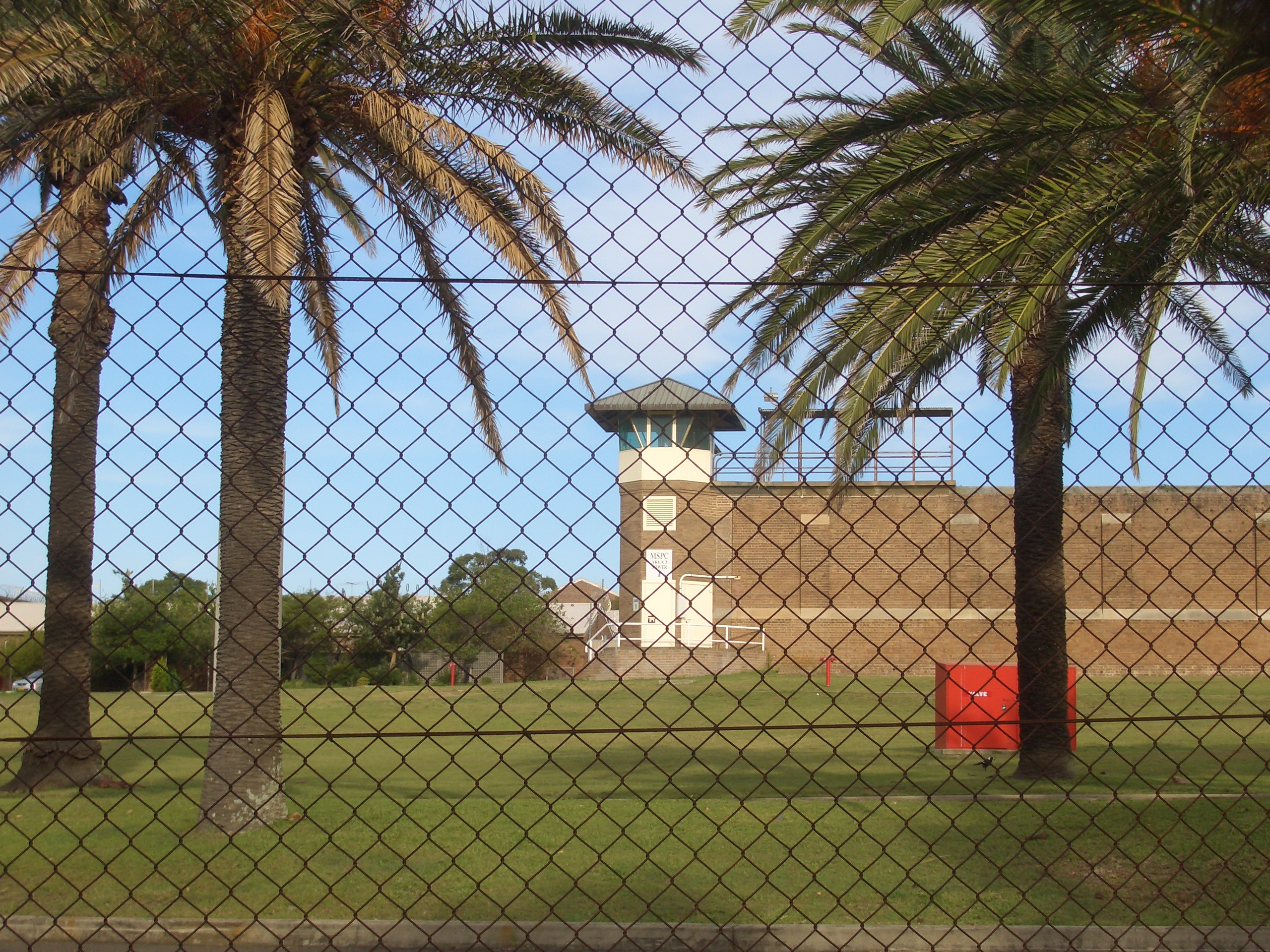
Long Bay Correctional Centre

As of May 2016 it was reported that the prison held approximately 1,200 prisoners, with capacity estimated as 1,000, resulting in overcrowding of the correctional centre.

=== Long Bay Hospital ===
The new Long Bay Hospital is a maximum security facility which holds a total of 120 inmate patients in four wards. It is jointly administered by Corrective Services NSW and NSW Health's Justice Health and Forensic Mental Health Network (Justice Health). The hospital became operational in July 2008, replacing the old Long Bay Hospital which was completely demolished in October 2008. The site of the old Long Bay Hospital is now the Long Bay Forensic Hospital, which took its first patients in late November 2008.

It was again in the news in 2015, when David Dungay, an Aboriginal man, died aged 26 in the hospital. Dungay had diabetes and schizophrenia, and died after being held down by five officers who had asked him to stop eating biscuits, while being injected with a sedative by a prison nurse. A coronial inquest in November 2019 found that none of the officers should face disciplinary action, saying that their "conduct was limited by systemic efficiencies in training", but the professional conduct of the nurse should be reviewed by the Nursing Board.

=== Metropolitan Special Programs Centre ===
Until recently called the Malabar Special Programs Centre, the Metropolitan Special Programs Centre (MSPC) is a maximum through to minimum security facility which houses many types of inmates. It is the second largest gaol in terms of inmate population in New South Wales. It holds remand inmates, medical transients (inmates undertaking medical treatment), inmates with short sentences and inmates undertaking therapeutic programs. The programs areas of the gaol comprises the Violent Offenders Therapeutic Program (VOTP), Developmentally Delayed Program, Lifestyles Unit (for HIV-positive inmates), which has been unused and empty since 2002, the Kevin Waller Unit for at-risk female inmates (currently used as an assessment unit for aged male inmates), Acute Crisis Management Unit (ACMU) for active suicidal and self-harmers, Multi Purpose Unit or Segregation (high risk inmates on segregation orders and inmates requiring non association for safety) and CUBIT (CUstody Based Intensive Therapy) sex offender program.

A large part of the maximum security area is a transit area where prisoners await a bed in their gaol of classification, or stay whilst obtaining medical treatment/surgery, or are held on remand whilst awaiting trial. 'Metropolitan Medical Transit Centre/LBH2' was a maximum security facility used to hold inmates who had been discharged from Long Bay Hospital or were awaiting medical appointments. Since closure in January 2006 the MSPC now undertakes the role of housing inmates receiving medical treatment. The MMTC re-opened in 2009 but now holds general population remand and medical transit inmates.

=== Special Purpose Centre ===
The Special Purpose Centre (SPC) is a maximum security facility which holds inmates requiring special, or strict, protection. As of 2001, the SPC had the capacity to hold up to 65 inmates who are placed in this unit as selected by an Interdepartmental Committee that includes senior police and correctional personnel who authenticate the information supplied by the prisoners to ensure that protection is warranted. Many of these prisoners are informers who never return to mainstream prison population and are only ever referred to by a number (such as CP01, Commissioners Pleasure 01). Corrective Services NSW advises that there are, however, numerous examples of inmates who make the transition from the SPC to other centres. The identities of inmates housed in this location are not disclosed and staff working there must sign confidentiality agreements.

This centre is often referred to as the "bomb shelter" or "super grass" by other inmates and houses police informants, inmates with bad debts and anyone else the commissioner of corrective services deems to be at risk and unable to be managed in standard protective custody.

== Notable prisoners ==
The following individuals have served all or part of their sentence at the Long Bay Correctional Centre:

Inmate name	Date sentenced	Length of sentence	Currently incarcerated	Date eligible for release	Nature of conviction / notoriety	Notes
Jai Abberton	10 Sep 2012	15 months with a minimum non-parole period of nine months	Time served	n/a	Assaulting police and causing grievous bodily harm; a member of the Bra Boys surf tribe.	
Robert Adamson	c. 1964		Time served		Theft; later a renowned Australian poet.	
Rodney Adler	16 Feb 2005	4½ years with a minimum non-parole period of 2½ years	Released (13 Oct 2007)	n/a	Knowingly disseminating false information; obtaining money by false or misleading statements; and being intentionally dishonest and failing to discharge his duties as a director of HIH Insurance.	
Darcy Dugan		Life imprisonment	Deceased 22 Aug 1991		Bank robber and a notorious prison escape artist.	
William Kamm	14 Oct 2005	15 years	Released on parole	November 2014	Multiple convictions of aggravated sexual assault in his capacity as a religious group leader.	
Salim Mehajer	2021				Various charges	
Archie McCafferty	c. 1973	Four consecutive terms of life imprisonment plus 14 years	Deported to Scotland, 1997	n/a	A serial killer and arguably one of Australia's most violent prisoners, also convicted for the manslaughter of a fellow prisoner.	
Milton Orkopoulos	25 Aug 2009	13 years; eight months with a minimum non-parole period of nine years	Yes	Jan 2018	Sexual assault of a minor, indecent assault and supplying heroin and cannabis; a former Australian Labor Party politician.	
René Rivkin	30 May 2003	Nine months of weekend detention	Deceased 1 May 2005	n/a	Insider trading; former Australian stockbroker and entrepreneur.	
Roger Rogerson	2 Sep 2016	Life imprisonment	Deceased 21 Jan 2024		Murder, drug trafficking, perverting the course of justice; a former police detective.	
Carmen Rupe			Deceased 14 Dec 2011	n/a	A New Zealand-born entertainer, cultural identity, and transgender activist.	
Bilal Skaf	16 Sep 2005	38 years with a minimum non-parole period of 32 years	Yes	11 Feb 2033	A leading perpetrator of the Sydney gang rapes whose original sentence of 55 years was reduced on multiple appeals.	
Neddy Smith		Life imprisonment	Deceased 8 Sep 2021		Armed robbery, murderer and heroin dealer, accused of being a hitman, served life.	
Simon Townsend	c. 1960s	One month	Time served	n/a	A conscientious objector of the Vietnam War, journalist and television presenter	
Robbie Waterhouse	c. 1992	Eight months' periodic detention	Time served	n/a	Lying to the Racing Appeals Tribunal; a bookmaker and racing identity.	

One of the killers of Dr Victor Chang, Chiew Seng Liew, a Malaysian citizen, was in Long Bay jail. He was released into the custody of waiting immigration officials and was deported to Malaysia.

== Cultural depictions ==
Long Bay Gaol has featured in several books and music:

- Hope Album 1993 A Pioneering Music Rehabilitation Program Produced by Vincent Ruello Published through Warner Chappell Music
- Australia's Hardest Prison: Inside the Walls of Long Bay Gaol (2014), a non-fiction work by James Phelps
- Long Bay (2015), a novel by Eleanor Limprecht telling the story of Rebecca Sinclair, who was sentenced to three years' Hard Labour for manslaughter after conducting an abortion, and was one of the gaol's first inmates in 1909.
- Permission to Lie (2011), a collection of short stories by Julie Chevalier set in prisons in Australia and the United States. Seven of the stories are set in Long Bay Gaol.

== Heritage listing ==
Long Bay Correctional Centre was listed on the New South Wales State Heritage Register on 2 April 1999. It is considered to be "the most complete expression" of the philosophy of Frederick Neitenstein, a prison reformer who was appointed appointed comptroller-general of New South Wales prisons in 1896.

== See also ==
- Punishment in Australia
