= Sydney gang rapes =

2000 Australian crime spree

The Sydney gang rapes were a series of gang rape attacks committed by a group of up to 14 youths led by Bilal Skaf against Australian women and teenage girls (two with Italian parents, one with Greek parents and one Aboriginal Australian girl), as young as 14, in Sydney, New South Wales, Australia, across several days in 2000. The crimes, described as ethnically motivated hate crimes by one columnist, were covered extensively by the news media, and prompted the passing of new laws. In 2002, nine men were convicted and sentenced to a combined total of more than 240 years in prison for their roles in the gang rapes. Although fourteen individuals were initially suspected, there was only sufficient evidence to convict nine. During sentencing, Judge Michael Finnane described the rapes as events that "you hear about or read about only in the context of wartime atrocities".

== Attacks ==
Date	Week day	Event
10 August 2000	Thursday	Attackers offered a ride and a portion of cannabis to two teenage girls aged 17 and 18. The women were taken by the attackers to Northcote Park, Greenacre, where more collaborators were waiting. The women were then forced to fellate eight males.
12 August 2000	Saturday	A 16-year-old girl was brought to Gosling Park, Greenacre, by 17-year-old Mohammed Skaf, who she believed was her friend. At the park she was raped by Mohammed's brother Bilal Skaf and one other man, with twelve other men present who she said were "standing around, laughing and talking in their own language". The second man held a gun to her head and kicked her in the stomach before she was able to escape.
30 August 2000	Wednesday	Another woman was approached by attackers at the Bankstown railway station, who proposed she join them in smoking some cannabis at another location. She agreed and went with them. However, she was taken to three separate locations by the men and raped 25 times by a total of fourteen men in an ordeal that lasted six hours. After the attacks, the woman was hosed down with a fire hose. The woman, who was known during the trial as 'C' to protect her identity, later told her story to 60 Minutes. She told of how the attackers called her an "Aussie Pig", asked her if "Leb cock tasted better than Aussie cock" and explained to her that she would now be raped "Leb-style".
4 September 2000	Monday	Two girls, both 16, were taken by the attackers from Beverly Hills railway station to a house in another suburb, where three men repeatedly raped them over a period of five hours. One of the victims was told that "You deserve it because you're an Australian". Due to a plea bargain and the victims not testifying in person, several aggravating factors – kidnap, threats to kill and knife use – were dropped from the prosecution of this crime, without the victims' knowledge.

== Further attempted attacks ==
A further series of gang rapes were said to have been attempted but thwarted. Four of the attackers were also convicted for an attack on Friday 4 August 2000 when they approached a fourteen-year-old girl on a train where she was threatened with violence, punched twice, slapped, and told that she would be forced to perform fellatio on several men and that she was going to be raped.

== Attackers ==
- Bilal Skaf, who was 18 years old at the time, led and orchestrated the three August 2000 attacks. He was initially sentenced to a total of 55 years' imprisonment but had his sentence for these attacks reduced by the New South Wales Court of Criminal Appeal to 28 years, with no parole for the first 22 years. However, on 28 July 2006, Acting Justice Jane Mathews added another ten years to his sentence for his role in the 12 August rape. His original conviction over this attack had been quashed in 2004 and a retrial ordered after it was revealed that two jurors had conducted their own investigations at Gosling Park. Bilal is eligible for release on parole from 11 February 2033. In March 2003, Skaf was charged with sending mail containing white powder to a corrections department official from prison in an apparent hoax terrorist act. In April 2015, he was attacked by two other inmates in jail and sustained "serious facial injuries".
- Mohammed Skaf, who was 17 years old at the time, the younger brother of Bilal Skaf, was sentenced to 32 years for his role in the gang rapes but also had his sentence reduced on appeal to 19 years with a non-parole period of 11 years. However, on 28 July 2006, he received an additional 15 years, with a minimum of seven and a half years over the Gosling Park attack. He was then eligible for release on parole from 1 July 2019. Skaf showed no remorse for his crimes, making sexually inappropriate remarks to female staff at the Kariong Juvenile Justice Centre where he was incarcerated and continued to blame his victims for initially agreeing to go with him because "they came out with us as soon as I asked them." His parole was denied in February 2020, with The State Parole Authority mentioning that "it appears that he still blames the victims for his offending, has no victim empathy and refuses to take responsibility for his actions". His parole was denied again in November 2020. Mohammed Skaf was released under "strict parole" conditions on 6 October 2021. The release on parole means he can be under "heavy surveillance" for 26 months. He will be monitored electronically for 24 hours a day, and he has been banned from some areas in Western Sydney.
- Belal Hajeid, who was 20 years old at the time, was convicted and imprisoned for 23 years with a non-parole period of 15 years. Hajeid later had his sentence reduced on appeal.
- Mohammed Sanoussi, who was 18 years old at the time, was convicted of gang rape and sentenced to 21 years in prison, with a non-parole period of 12 years, for his involvement in the assaults that occurred on 10 and 30 August. Sanoussi later had his sentence reduced to 16 years on appeal. Shortly after Sanoussi's conviction, his brother and cousin were banned from visiting him in prison for three months after a rowdy clash with staff at the Kariong Juvenile Justice Centre where he was incarcerated. Shouting broke out when staff removed the visitors after they had tried to pass newspaper clippings to the brothers about their sentencing the previous day. Sanoussi remained behind bars when denied parole for a second time in October 2011. Parole applications were rejected on three occasions. He has been on weekend leave since October 2012 and day leave since May 2013. On 5 September 2013, Sanoussi was granted parole with strict conditions but was not immediately released. The next day, his parole was revoked. Upon release, Sanoussi was to live at his family's home. However, late on 5 September it became known that his two brothers, who also lived there and are linked to the Brothers for Life gang, had been charged, with two others, with a violent assault. The State Parole Authority met and decided that "...the previously approved accommodation was not suitable in light of the new information." On appeal, Judge Terence Christie conceded that his brother's crimes had nothing to do with Sanoussi and that he should be released. Sanoussi was paroled on 10 October 2013. Among other conditions, he is not to have contact with his two brothers without permission.
- Mahmoud Sanoussi, who was 17 years old at the time, brother of Mohammed Sanoussi, was sentenced to 11 years and three months' imprisonment with parole available after six and a half years. He unsuccessfully appealed against his sentence in 2005. He was released on parole in May 2009 but had his parole revoked in March 2010 for his drug use.
- Mahmoud Chami, who was 20 years old at the time, was sentenced to 18 years with a non-parole period of ten years. Chami unsuccessfully appealed against his sentence in 2004. He was released to parole in April 2013.
- "H" (Identity sealed: H has had his name suppressed under court order because of his "intellectual and mental disabilities"), then 19, was sentenced to 25 years with a non-parole period of 15 years. 'H' later had his sentence reduced on appeal. A parole hearing was held in October 2013, and he was released in February 2014 under strict parole conditions.
- Tayyab Sheikh, who was 16 years old at the time, was initially sentenced to 15 years' imprisonment with a non-parole period of nine years for his role in the 30 August rape. He was retried and sentenced to eight years and six months' imprisonment, with a non-parole period of four years and six months. He was released from prison in late June 2007.
- Mohammed Ghanem, who was 19 years old at the time, was the final person to be sentenced and was imprisoned for 40 years with a non-parole period of 26 years for two counts of rape. Ghanem, like his co-offenders Bilal Skaf and Mohammed Skaf, showed no remorse for his actions, effectively opting to "tough it out" at the Kariong Juvenile Justice Centre, where he was detained while awaiting trial.

== Racial controversy ==
The conservative commentator Miranda Devine said the crimes were racially motivated hate crimes. She also asserted that much of the media had attempted to "airbrush" the racial element out of reporting on the crime spree; she quoted a victim that all mention of the overtly racist statements made by the perpetrators had been "censored" from their official statements by prosecutors to avoid complicating attempts to negotiate guilty pleas with the accused. The Sydney Morning Herald reported that the rapists had stated to a victim during the attack, "You deserve it because you're an Australian" and "I'm going to fuck you Leb-style".

== New laws ==
The gang rapes led to the passage of new legislation through the Parliament of New South Wales, increasing the sentences for gang rapists by creating a new category of crime known as "aggravated sexual assault in company".

Also, in the course of one of the trials, the defendants refused counsel, as they believed that "all lawyers were against Muslims". This led to the contentious prospect of the defendants being able to cross-examine the witnesses, including the victims, a situation that was averted by further legislation being put through the state parliament.

Actions taken by government ministers, including Premier of New South Wales Bob Carr, who publicly identified the perpetrators' background, led to controversy. Ethnic community group leaders, including Keysar Trad of the Lebanese Muslim Association, complained that Carr was smearing the entire Lebanese Muslim community with the crimes of a few of its members and that his public comments would stir up ethnic hatred.

The first court case heard under the new sentencing regime concerned the Ashfield gang rapes of girls by Pakistani and Nepalese immigrants in Ashfield on 28 July 2002.

== Role of technology in coordination of the attacks ==
The attackers used SMS and mobile phones to orchestrate the attack and to phone ahead to other attackers to co-ordinate transport of rape gang members to the locations where women were being held. Authorities later released some of this material, recovered from the rapists' mobile phones.

The attackers texted violent anti-Christian messages, such as, "When you are feeling down... bash a Christian or Catholic and lift up" and sexually degrading texts like, "I've got a slut with me bro, come to Punchbowl".

== See also ==
- Ashfield gang rapes
- 1995 Okinawa rape incident
