= Bilal Skaf =

Lebanese Australian serial gang rapist (born 1981)

- Skaf's mugshot, December 2000
- Born: 14 September 1981 (age 45); Sydney, New South Wales
- Other name: Elie Skaf
- Occupation: State Rail Authority employee
- Known for: Sydney gang rapes
- Children: 1
- Parent(s): Mustapha Skaf; Baria Skaf
- Relatives: Mohammed Skaf (brother)
- Status: Held in prison
- Conviction: Aggravated sexual intercourse without consent
- Penalty: 31 years' imprisonment

Bilal Skaf (Arabic: بلال سكاف) (born 14 September 1981) is an Australian serial gang rapist who led groups of men to commit gang rape attacks against women and girls in Sydney in 2000.

For his crimes, Skaf is serving a 31-year prison sentence with a non-parole period of 28 years, and will be eligible for parole in 2033. He was originally sentenced to 55 years with a 40-year non-parole period, but that was modified several times upon appeal.

== Early life ==
Skaf's mother, Baria, worked as a cleaner and aged care worker, and his father, Mustapha, worked for State Rail Authority in Sydney, gaining a good reputation among his colleagues. Bilal attended Strathfield South High School in Enfield, New South Wales, and left school at 14. He worked as a spray painter before his father used his own good employment record to get his son on the State Rail payroll. That was despite Bilal having been convicted for shoplifting, theft and carjackings.

== Gang rapes ==
In 2000, Bilal Skaf led a gang that engaged in a series of gang rapes in Sydney against women and girls as young as 14 years. In 2002, nine men, including Skaf, were sentenced to a total of more than 240 years' jail.

Skaf was engaged at the time of his arrest and although his fiancée stood by him during his trial, she ended their engagement soon after his conviction. Skaf's response was to sketch cartoons depicting his former fiancée being raped and murdered. Since he was first charged in November 2000, Skaf has remained unrepentant. During his trial, he claimed he was involved only in cases of consensual sex, laughed when his verdict was read and swore at the judge when he received his sentence.

On 16 September 2005, the New South Wales Court of Criminal Appeal reduced Skaf's 55-year sentence to a maximum of 28 years, with parole available after 22 years. NSW Attorney General Bob Debus decided that the government would seek leave for an appeal to the High Court of Australia against the sentence reduction. An earlier appeal had already reduced his sentence to 46 years, after a successful appeal against one of his convictions.

On 3 February 2006, the High Court refused leave to appeal, arguing that the New South Wales Court of Criminal Appeal had been left with no choice because of the many errors by the trial judge in sentencing Skaf to 46 years. That meant he could be freed at the age of 42 in 2023. A further appeal led to a 31-year sentence being imposed. Skaf will now be eligible for release on 11 February 2033.

== Family ==
Bilal Skaf is the brother of Mohammed Skaf, also a gang rape attacker sentenced to 32 years' jail for his part in the attacks. Bilal and Mohammed are the sons of Mustapha and Baria Skaf, who emigrated to Australia from Lebanon in the 1970s.

In 2019, his brother Mohammed Skaf began his application for release to parole where Margaret Cunneen SC, who prosecuted the men, together with their lawyer Omar Juweinat urged that he be granted parole.

== Prison life ==
Bilal Skaf began his sentence in Sydney's Long Bay Correctional Centre but was soon moved to maximum security in Goulburn Gaol after prison officers uncovered plans by fellow inmates to inject him with HIV-infected blood.

In March 2003, he was charged with writing a threatening letter to Corrective Services NSW Commissioner, Ron Woodham. The letter had been found in an internal prison mailbox. The letter said: "Don't take this as a threat but if all Muslims aren't released by January 2003 Australia and citizens will be in danger of bombing". White powder had been put into the letter.

While awaiting a court appearance for the letter incident, in July 2003, drawings of gang rape were discovered in Skaf's prison cell. The drawings depicted violence and rape against his former fiancée, who had ended their relationship in March 2003. After she had cut all ties with Skaf, she was subjected to threatening phone calls and letters. She now says he can "rot in hell".

According to prison guards, Skaf thought that he would be given a hero's welcome by Lebanese inmates such as the gangland murderer Michael Kanaan. Instead, he was targeted by them for bringing disgrace to their community.

According to Commissioner Woodham, Skaf has not shown remorse for his crimes. He also says Skaf has warned prison officers to be careful outside of work, as they may be shot.

In April 2015, Skaf was attacked by two other inmates in jail and sustained "serious facial injuries".
