= Life imprisonment in Australia =

Life imprisonment is the most severe criminal sentence available to the courts in Australia. Most cases attracting the sentence are murder. It is also imposed, albeit rarely, for sexual assault, manufacturing and trafficking commercial quantities of illicit drugs, and offences against the justice system and government security.

As of 2022, there are 418 prisoners in Australia serving a life sentence.

== Offences and minimum terms ==
=== Mandatory life imprisonment ===
The death penalty in Australia fell into disuse in 1967, and between then and 1985, each jurisdiction abolished it and (in most cases) replaced it with mandatory life imprisonment. Only Queensland had already abolished the death penalty prior to 1967.

Mandatory life imprisonment was subsequently abolished in New South Wales in 1982, Victoria in 1986, Tasmania in 1995, and Western Australia in 2008, though it was reintroduced in New South Wales in 2011 for the murder of a police officer.

When the death penalty was abolished in the Australian Capital Territory in 1973, there were no offences subject to mandatory life imprisonment; even so, life imprisonment can be imposed.

Life imprisonment remains mandatory for murder in South Australia, the Northern Territory, and Queensland.

=== State and territories ===
The criminal law and prisons are primarily administered by state and territory governments within Australia's federal system. As such, there is considerable divergence of which offences can attract life sentences across Australia.

The minimum non-parole period on a life sentence varies between jurisdictions, and between different crimes attracting the penalty. A life sentence in Western Australia, for a crime other than murder, attracts a minimum non-parole period of seven years, while the equivalent term in Queensland is 15 years. For murder, the minimum non-parole period on a life sentence in the Australian Capital Territory is 10 years, as it is in Western Australia (except when committed during an aggravated home burglary, in which case it is 15 years).

In South Australia, Queensland and the Northern Territory, the minimum non-parole period for a life sentence for an offender convicted of murder is 20 years. In Queensland, if the offender has been convicted of the murder of a police officer, the minimum non-parole period is 25 years, and in the case of multiple/serial murder or where the offender has a prior conviction for murder, the minimum non-parole period is 30 years. In the Northern Territory, exceptional circumstances can reduce the minimum 20 year non-parole period, but conversely, the minimum non-parole for murder in circumstances of aggravation is 25 years. In South Australia, a guilty plea discount can reduce up to 25% of the minimum non-parole period of 20 years.

The minimum non-parole term for a life sentence in Victoria is 30 years, unless a court considers it not in the interest of justice to set such a term.

New South Wales is the only Australian state or territory to provide for a mandatory life without parole sentence, specifically where the offender has been convicted of the murder of a police officer.

Following a string of high-profile 'coward punch' related deaths, in 2014 the Queensland government created a new offence of unlawful striking causing death, the maximum penalty for which is life imprisonment.

The Criminal Code of Queensland, Western Australia and the Northern Territory also provide for life imprisonment for aircraft hijacking, aiding a suicide, terrorism and for perjuring to procure a conviction of an offence punishable by life imprisonment. The Criminal Code of the Northern Territory also provides for life imprisonment for terrorism and aircraft hijacking, as well as for most other serious violent offences.

Every state and territory except Tasmania provides for life imprisonment for some drug offences, though Tasmanians remain subject to Commonwealth law, which allows for life imprisonment for some drug offences. Primarily, these offences are manufacturing, trafficking or cultivating commercial quantities of controlled drugs and procuring children to do so, and in Queensland, supplying any quantity of particular drugs to children under 16.

Child sexual abuse offences can also attract a life sentence in New South Wales, Queensland, South Australia and the Northern Territory. In Queensland, if child sexual abuse was committed by a repeat offender, a life sentence is mandatory and cannot be mitigated or varied under any law. Other offences capable of attracting a sentence of life imprisonment are rape, arson, incest, riot (under aggravated circumstances), piracy and destroying sea walls (Queensland) and treason (Tasmania).

In Queensland, the law also provides a maximum punishment of life imprisonment for aircraft hijacking, burglary or unlawful entry into a dwelling (under aggravated circumstances or by means of a break), armed robbery, violent robbery, attempt to commit armed robbery, attempt to commit violent robbery, conspiracy to bring false accusation against another where an innocent person is convicted and punished with life imprisonment for a crime he or she did not commit, rape, aggravated sexual assault, manslaughter, attempted murder, stupefying (poisoning or drugging) with the intent to commit another indictable offence, disabling with intent to commit an indictable offence (choking, suffocating or strangulating or rendering or attempted to render any person incapable of resistance), and most other serious violent offences.

The Australian Capital Territory and Victoria are the only Australian jurisdictions to explicitly prohibit the imposition of life imprisonment without parole on children.

Prisoners serving life sentences in Australia (2022)
- Most serious offence: Number of prisoners
- Homicide offences: 392
- Sexual assault offences: 17
- Illicit drug offences: 3
- Offences against justice: 3
- Total: 418

=== Commonwealth legislation ===
Under Commonwealth legislation, there are 68 offences that can attract life imprisonment.

Sixty three such offences are within the Criminal Code Act 1995, including the setting or placing of explosive and lethal devices; treason, treachery and espionage offences; terrorist acts, as well as preparing or planning terrorist acts and financing terrorism; incursions into foreign countries with the intention of engaging in hostile activity and related preparatory conduct (including accumulating weapons, providing or participating in training, giving or receiving goods and services and allowing use of buildings and vehicles to support such offences).

Further offences in the Criminal Code that allow for life imprisonment include crimes against humanity (genocide, war crimes), the murder of UN personnel and various drug offences including the manufacturing, trafficking, importing and exporting of commercial quantities of controlled drugs and plants, cultivating commercial quantities of controlled plants, and procuring children to facilitate similar drug offences.

The Crimes (Aviation) Act 1991 provides for life imprisonment for hijacking offences, destruction of aircraft with intent to kill and prejudicing safe operation of an aircraft with intention to kill, and the Crimes Act 1914 provides for life imprisonment for piracy.

== Notable life sentences with non-parole periods ==
The longest overall non-parole period for a single murder is 45 years and six months, being served by South Australian Michael Barry Fyfe. Fyfe had 28 years added to the 17.5 year sentence he was already serving when he stabbed to death fellow inmate and former police officer Joe Tilley in the kitchen of Yatala Prison in January 1995.

The longest non-parole period imposed for a single murder is 35 years, being served by Melbourne CBD gunman Christopher Wayne Hudson (Victoria).

The longest non-parole period imposed on a woman is 32 years, being served by South Australian Angelika Gavare, who murdered and dismembered pensioner Vonne McGlynn in November 2008 for financial gain, and Victorian Cai Xia Liao, who repeatedly stabbed Mai Mach and her four-year-old grandson Alistair Kwong with gardening shears in a vicious attack.

Notable prisoners serving at least one life sentence with a specified non-parole period:

Name	State	Convictions	Sentence	Non-parole period	Age at sentence	Date of sentence	Notes
Anthony Rawlins	Queensland	Murder ×1	Life imprisonment with hard labour	Undetermined	39	15 February 1956	Deceased; died on 17 April 2010 aged 82. Denied all applications for parole whilst incarcerated. At the time of his death whilst incarcerated at Wolston Correctional Centre, he was the oldest and longest serving prisoner in Australia.
William MacDonald	New South Wales	Murder ×4	Penal servitude for life	Undetermined	39	24 September 1963	Deceased; died on 12 May 2015 aged 90. Known as the 'Sydney mutilator' in the media and 'Old Bill' in prison. At the time of his death whilst incarcerated at Prince of Wales Hospital, he was the oldest and longest serving prisoner in New South Wales. He declined to attend a court hearing in 2000 to determine his eligibility for parole, claiming he was institutionalised with no desire to live outside of prison.
Terry Mark Hitchins	NSW	Murder x2	2x Penal servitude for life	24 years	16	15 July 1981	Deceased; died on 26 May 2022 aged 57 years and 9 months from a drug overdose whilst incarcerated at South Coast Correctional Centre after over 40 years and 10 months imprisonment. Hitchins received two sentences of penal servitude for life with Justice John Slattery ordering: "serious consideration be given to prisoner Hitchins spending the rest of his time in prison". In 1993, Hitchins' sentence was redetermined to "two minimum terms of twenty-four years penal servitude" with an additional term of "for the remainder of his natural life" and an eligibility for parole date set as 14 July 2005. Hitchins refused to undertake any counselling or pre-release programs whilst incarcerated and his applications for parole were denied, citing Justice Slattery's recommendation he never be released. Hitchins murdered two taxi drivers, Raymond Savage and John Collins, 14 days apart; one by burning him alive whilst trapped in the boot of his taxi, the other by violent stabbing.
Jaymes Todd	Victoria	Murder; rape; attempted rape; sexual assault	Life Imprisonment	35 years	20	September 2019	
Reginald John Little	New South Wales	Murder x4, arson	Penal servitude for life plus 14 years	28 years	24	25 November 1976	On Christmas Day, 25 December 1975, Little set fire to the Savoy Hotel at Kings Cross, causing the deaths of 15 people and injuries to a further 25. Little was sentenced to life imprisonment without parole which was re-determined to a non-parole period of twenty-eight years in 1996. He was released on parole from Silverwater jail on 12 May 2010.
Adrian Ernest Bayley	Victoria	Murder; rape	Life Imprisonment	35 years	41	June 2013	
William Patrick Mitchell	WA	Murder x4	Life Imprisonment	Undetermined	24	1993	In 2024, the West Australian government forbade Mitchell from applying for a non-parole period to be set for a further 6 years.
Garry Francis Newman	SA	Murder	Life Imprisonment	29 years	50	April 2010	
Ernest Fisher	WA	Murder	Life Imprisonment	18 years	67	August 2018	
Brett Peter Cowan	QLD	Murder; indecent treatment of a child under 16; interference with a corpse	Life Imprisonment	20 years	44	March 2014	Sentenced over the murder of Daniel Morcombe
Jack Brearley	WA	Murder	Life Imprisonment	22 years	24	June 2025	
Brodie Palmer	WA	Murder	Life Imprisonment	18 years	30	June 2025	
Dieter Pfennig	SA	Murder ×2; abduction ×2; rape	2× life imprisonment	60 years	44	1992: 25* years; 2016: additional 35 years	*1994 'Truth in sentencing' legislation reduced an initial 38 year non-parole period to 25 years. Pfenning has the longest non-parole period of any Australian prisoner: he will be 103 before he becomes eligible for parole.
Michael Fyfe	SA	Murder; attempted murder; causing grievous bodily harm; causing death by dangerous driving; assaulting a police officer ×2; several assaults; assault occasioning actual bodily harm; escape lawful custody	Life imprisonment	45 years and 6 months	In custody since age 25	In custody since May 1987	Fyfe's total non-parole period is the longest of any Australian prisoner convicted of a single murder.
Angelika Gavare	SA	Murder	Life imprisonment	32 years	35	November 2011	Gavare's non-parole period is, equal with Cai Xia Liao, the longest imposed on a female by any Australian court.
James Miller	SA	Murder ×6	6× life imprisonment	35 years*	40	March 1980	Deceased; died of cancer in October 2008. *Miller applied for a non-parole period to be determined in 1999, which was approved and imposed in February 2000.
James Gargasoulas	Victoria	Murder ×6; reckless conduct endangering life ×27	6× life imprisonment	46 years	27	February 2019	Gargasoulas received the longest non-parole period resulting from a single trial of any Australian prisoner.
Carl Williams	Victoria	Murder ×3; conspiracy to murder	3× life imprisonment	35 years	36	May 2007	Deceased; killed in prison April 2010
Keith Faure	Victoria	Murder ×2	2× life imprisonment	19 years	54	May 2006	
Malcolm Clarke	Victoria	Murder	Life imprisonment	25 years	49	December 2004	
Steven James Hunter	Victoria	Murder	Life imprisonment	35 years	47	20 November 2012	Originally sentenced to life without parole for the murder of Sarah Cafferkey, 11 days after being released from prison on parole for sentences of kidnapping and intentionally causing injury. Hunter's sentenced was reduced on appeal to life with a non-parole period of 35 years on account of his guilty plea. Hunter had previously been imprisoned for the 1988 murder of a teenage girl which he was sentenced to 16 years imprisonment with a non-parole period of 13 years.
Nicola Spina	Victoria	Murder x2; false imprisonment	2× life imprisonment	25 years	54	August 2003	Deceased, died in prison in 2011 of a heart attack
John Sharpe	Victoria	Murder ×2	2× Life imprisonment	33 years	38	August 2005	
Brent Quarry	Victoria	Murder; causing injury intentionally; causing injury recklessly	Life imprisonment	24 years	32	February 2004	
Michael Lane	Victoria	Murder	Life imprisonment	24 years	48	June 2003	
Gregory Brazel	Victoria	Murder	Life imprisonment	27 years	48	March 2003	
Lloyd Crosbie	Victoria	Murder ×2	2× life imprisonment	30 years	20	March 2003	
Andrew Mark Norrie	Victoria/NSW	Murder	Life imprisonment	14 years and 6 months (Victoria); life imprisonment (NSW)	39/24	December 2001	In New South Wales, Norrie was sentenced to life imprisonment without parole by Justice Mervyn Finlay in 1987. Upon a change in NSW legislation, Norrie was entitled to apply for a non-parole period to be set. On 22 August 2006, Justice Andrew Bell redetermined his sentence of life imprisonment and prohibited Norrie from applying for parole for the subsequent 20 years.
Peter Knight	Victoria	Murder	Life imprisonment	23 years	48	November 2002	
John Horrocks	Victoria	Murder; attempted murder, conduct endangering life	Life imprisonment	23 years	39	October 2000	
Truong Phuc	Victoria	Murder; kidnapping	Life imprisonment	23 years and 8 months	40	June 2000	
Dean Williamson	Victoria	Murder	Life imprisonment	24 years	30	March 2000	Deceased; died by suicide in 2000 at Barwon Prison
Robert Parsons	Victoria	Murder	Life imprisonment	25 years	55	May 1999	
Manuel Adajian	Victoria	Murder ×2; attempted murder; armed robbery	2× life imprisonment	25 years	42	May 1998	
Lindsay Beckett	Victoria	Murder ×2	2× life imprisonment	35 years	24	August 1998	
Christopher Hudson	Victoria	Murder; attempted murder ×2; intentionally causing serious injury	Life imprisonment	35 years	30	September 2008	Hudson received the longest non-parole period for a single murder of any Australian prisoner.
Cai Xia Liao	Victoria	Murder ×2; intentionally causing injury; false imprisonment	Life imprisonment	32 years	45	December 2015	Liao's non-parole period is, equal with Angelika Gavare, the longest imposed on a female by any Australian court
Massimo Sica	QLD	Murder ×3	3× life imprisonment	35 years	42	July 2012	
Valmae Beck	QLD	Murder; rape	Life imprisonment	14 years and 6 months	44	1988	Deceased, died of heart failure May 2008
Tracey Wigginton	QLD	Murder	Life imprisonment	13 years	25	January 1991	Wigginton was released on parole in January 2012
Ashley Paul Griffith	QLD	Repeated sexual conduct with a child ×15, rape ×28, indecent treatment of a child under 16 under 12 under care ×190, making child exploitation material ×67, producing child abuse material outside of Australia ×4, distributing child abuse material outside Australia, using a carriage service for child pornography, possession of child exploitation material	Life imprisonment	27 years	46	December 2024	
Jessica Stasinowsky	WA	Wilful murder	Strict security life imprisonment	24 years	21	March 2008	
Valerie Parashumti	WA	Wilful murder	Strict security life imprisonment	24 years	19	March 2008	
Catherine Birnie	WA	Murder ×4; aggravated sexual assault; deprivation of liberty	4× strict security life imprisonment	20 years	35	March 1987	*Though becoming parole eligible in 2007, every serving Attorney General since has invariably stated Birnie will be denied parole during their tenure.
David Birnie	WA	Murder ×4; aggravated sexual assault; deprivation of liberty	4× strict security life imprisonment	20 years	36	February & March 1987	Deceased; died by suicide in October 2005
Dante Arthurs	WA	Murder, unlawful detention	Life imprisonment	13 years	23	November 2007	Arthurs was refused parole in 2019
'F' (an unidentified child)	WA	Wilful murder	Life imprisonment	12 years	16 (15 at time of offence)	August 1992	'F' was released from prison in 2014 after serving 22 years, with a subsequent parole term of five years
Douglas Crabbe	NT	Murder ×5	5× life imprisonment	30 years*	38	October 1985	*Changes to NT sentencing laws resulted in a non-parole period being set in December 2004. Crabbe was transferred to a Western Australian prison in 2005, and despite being parole eligible from 2013, successive Attorney Generals have indicated they will not approve his release
Bradley Murdoch	NT	Murder; deprivation of liberty; aggravated unlawful assault	Life imprisonment	28 years	47	December 2005	
Evelyn Namatjira	NT	Murder	Life imprisonment	15 years	46	December 2012	
Ben William McLean	NT	Murder ×2	2× life imprisonment	25 years	20	May 2005	
Phu Ngoc Trinh	NT	Murder ×2	2× life imprisonment	25 years	19	May 2005	
James O'Neill	Tasmania	Murder	Life imprisonment	Undetermined	28	Convicted November 1975	*O'Neill was denied parole after applications in 1991 and 2005. He is now Tasmania's longest serving prisoner See also: Disappearance of the Beaumont children
Joseph Butler	QLD	Sexual assault against minors under 16	At Her Majesty's Pleasure	Indefinite	~ 31	June 1970	Incarcerated 'At Her Majesty's Pleasure' with the orders to remain imprisoned "until the Governor in Council is satisfied on the report of two medical practitioners that it is expedient to release". Butler is considered intellectually disabled and incapable of controlling his pedophilic urges.
Edward Pollentine	QLD	Attempted rape x2; carnal knowledge against the order of nature x4; indecently dealing with a girl under the age of 16 years 2; abduction x2; indecently dealing with a boy under the age of 16 x4	At Her Majesty's Pleasure	Indefinite	25	24 July 1984	Incarcerated 'At Her Majesty's Pleasure'. Sentenced with the orders to remain imprisoned "until the Governor in Council is satisfied on the report of two medical practitioners that it is expedient to release".
Errol George Radan	QLD	Sexual assault against minors under 16 x7; Carnal knowledge against the order of nature x1	At Her Majesty's Pleasure; in addition to or in lieu of 12 years imprisonment with hard labour	Indefinite	45	31 May 1984	Deceased; died aged 83 on 26 October 2022 whilst incarcerated at Princess Alexandra Hospital's Secure Unit. Radan had been incarcerated at Wolston Correctional Centre under a term of 'At Her Majesty's Pleasure' and was to remain imprisoned "until the Governor in Council is satisfied on the report of two medical practitioners that it is expedient to release".

== Notable life sentences without the possibility of parole ==
In the most extreme cases, the sentencing judge will refuse to fix a non-parole period or will place the prisoner on an indefinite imprisonment order, which means that the prisoner will spend the rest of their life in prison unless they successfully petition the applicable governor or territorial administrator for a Royal prerogative of mercy, which is exceptionally rare.

In New South Wales for example, where most life sentences are ordered without the fixing of a non-parole period, the mandatory sentence for murder is life imprisonment. A sentencing judge must be satisfied beyond reasonable doubt that the level of the offenders culpability is at such an extreme level that the community's interest in the combined effect of deterrence, retribution and punishment can only be served by the imposition of life sentence.

The most life sentences without the possibility for parole in each Australian state and territory are:

Most sentences and longest incarcerated
State	Name	Life sentences	Longest Serving Prisoner	Incarceration Commenced
Tasmania	Martin John Bryant	35	Martin John Bryant	1996
South Australia	John Justin Bunting	11	John Justin Bunting and Robert Joe Wagner	2003
New South Wales	Roger Dean	11	Allan Baker	1974
Victoria	Julian Knight	7	Raymond Edmunds	1986
Australian Capital Territory	Allen Douglas Thompson	6	Allen Douglas Thompson	1984
Western Australia	Anthony Robert Harvey	5	Anthony Robert Harvey	2019
Northern Territory	Martin Leach	3	Martin Leach	1984
Queensland	Rebecca Louise Mahony	2	Barrie John Watts	1990

Notable prisoners serving a sentence of life imprisonment without the possibility of parole include:

Indicates cases where imprisonment is still ongoing

Name	State	Conviction	Sentence	Age at sentence	Sentence start date	Notes
Lian Bin (Robert) Xie	NSW	Murder ×5	5× life imprisonment	53	13 February 2017	When sentencing, Justice Elizabeth Fullerton ordered: "on counts 1 to 5 inclusive on the indictment, you are convicted of the murders of Min (Norman) Lin, Yun Li (Lily) Lin, Yun Bin (Irene) Lin, Henry Lin and Terry Lin. On each count, you are sentenced to imprisonment for life."
Leonard Keith Lawson	NSW	Murder ×2, Rape x1	Penal servitude for life	34	1962	Deceased; died whilst incarcerated at Grafton Gaol on 29 November 2003, aged 76. At the time of his death, Lawson was the longest serving prisoner in the New South Wales corrections system. In 1954, he was the last prisoner sentenced to death for sexual assault and rape (later commuted to a 14-year prison sentence). An application in the Supreme Court of New South Wales to set a non-parole period for the 1962 murders was refused in 1994.
Stephen Leslie Bradley	NSW	Murder	Penal servitude for life	34	10 October 1960	Deceased; died whilst incarcerated at Goulburn Correctional Centre on 6 October 1968, aged 42. Bradley was sentenced by Justice Sir John Clancy for the murder of schoolboy Graeme Thorne (8) in July 1960. Justice Clancy made no comment when sentencing and whilst 'visibly upset' ordered: "the sentence of the Court is that you are sentenced to penal servitude for life".
Kwang Kyung Yoo	NSW	Murder ×3	3x Life imprisonment	49	19 February 2024	When sentencing, Justice Ian Harrison ordered: "These killings were horrific and violent acts, senselessly cruel and cynical, perpetrated without a trace of human compassion or consideration for the dignity of the Cho family... you are convicted of the murders of Min Kyung Cho (41), Hyun Soo Cho (39) and Benjamin Cho (7). On each count, you are sentenced to imprisonment for life".
Barry Gordon Hadlow	QLD	Murder	Life imprisonment with hard labour	48	1990	Deceased; died aged 65 on 13 July 2007 at Princess Alexandra Hospital's Secure Unit whilst incarcerated for life at Wolston Correctional Centre for the 1990 murder of Stacy-Ann Tracy in Roma. Hadlow had previously served a 22-year sentence (released on parole in 1985) for the 1963 murder of Sandra Dorothy Brown in Townsville. Hadlow was sentenced in 1991 to "life imprisonment with a recommendation that he never be released".
Richard William Leonard	NSW	Murder x2	Penal servitude for life	24	3 May 1995	When sentencing, Justice Jeremy Badgery-Parker ordered: "the objective seriousness of the two crimes taken together is such that no penalty would fit the case other than the imposition of the maximum sentence... You were convicted by the jury for the murder of Stephen Dempsey and you have pleaded guilty to the murder of Ezzedine Bahmad. In respect to each of those crimes, you are sentenced to penal servitude for life."
Robert Mark Steele	NSW	Murder x5	x5 Life imprisonment plus 12 years	22	1993	Deceased; died by suicide on 22–23 December 1994 whilst incarcerated at Goulburn Correctional Centre.
Stanley James Fyffe	NSW	Murder	Life imprisonment	35	12 April 2002	See Anthony John Hore sentencing remarks.
Anthony John Hore	NSW	Murder x2	Life imprisonment	22	29 July 1988	In July 1988 Hore was sentenced to a term of penal servitude for life plus 14 years for the murder and robbery of a man in Newcastle in 1987 whilst on probation. This was redetermined to a minimum term of 13 years with an eligibility for parole date of 13 December 2000. In March 2000, whilst incarcerated at Silverwater Correctional Complex for the 1987 murder, Hore and his accomplice, Stanley Fyffe, murdered fellow prisoner Stephen Anthony Moore. When sentencing, Justice Graham Barr ordered: "The murder of the deceased was an execution of the coolest kind. It was carefully planned. The deceased, a man of small build, was lured under some pretext to the place of execution. He was there swiftly and efficiently put down by three strong men. His injuries were horrific. The murder was an act of great depravity... you are sentenced to imprisonment for life". An appeal of his and Fyffe's life sentences was dismissed in March 2005.
Malcolm John Naden	NSW	Murder ×2, aggravated indecent assault, shooting with intent to murder and break, enter, and steal x14	Life imprisonment plus 40 years	39	14 June 2013	When sentencing, Justice Derek Price ordered for the murders of Lateesha Naden and Kristy Scholes in 2005, the shooting with intent to murder of Senior Constable MacFadyen in 2011 as well as all other counts: "Mr Naden you have been sentenced to life imprisonment. You will not be released on parole at any time during your life sentence."
Vincent Stanford	NSW	Murder; aggravated sexual assault	Life imprisonment plus 15 years	26	13 October 2016	When sentencing, Justice Robert Hulme ordered: "The offender is convicted in respect of the aggravated sexual assault and murder of Stephanie Clare Scott. For the aggravated sexual assault, the offender is sentenced to imprisonment for 15 years. I decline to nominate a proportion of that sentence as a non-parole period as there is no utility in doing so. For the murder, the offender is sentenced to imprisonment for life."
Justin Laurens Stein	NSW	Murder	Life imprisonment	33	26 August 2024	When sentencing, Justice Helen Wilson ordered: "Some instances of murder are so grave that the maximum penalty is the only appropriate penalty" and "for the murder of Charlise Mutten, on or about 12 January 2022, Justin Laurens Stein is sentenced to imprisonment for life."
Peter James Johnson	NSW	Murder x2; attempting to use bank accounts x3; dishonestly obtaining monies from the bank accounts x12	Life imprisonment plus 12 months	53	29 March 2007	When sentencing, Justice Anthony Whealy determined for the murders of Ian and Anna Hughes at their South Maroota home in September 2005 that "the offender is to remain in prison for the term of his natural life."
Roger Dean	NSW	Murder ×11; recklessly causing grievous bodily harm ×8; larceny as a clerk ×2	11× life imprisonment plus 21 years	37	1 August 2013	When sentencing, Justice Megan Latham stated: "on counts 1 to 11 inclusive on the indictment, you are convicted of the murders of Dorothy Sterling, Dorothy Wu, Alma Smith, Lola Bennett, Ella Wood, Urbana Alipio, Caesar Galea, Doris Becke, Reginald Willaim Green, Verna Webeck and Neeltje Valkay. On each count, you are sentenced to life imprisonment."
Bronson Matthew Blessington	NSW	Murder; abduction; rape; robbery ×2	Life imprisonment plus 25 years*	16	September 1990	When sentencing, Justice Peter Newman ordered: "In the case of the two youths Elliott and Blessington, I find this to be a difficult task, difficult because of their extreme youth, difficult in terms of the principles of law which I have to apply. To sentence prisoners so young to a long term of imprisonment is, of course, a heavy task. However, the facts surrounding the commission of these crimes are so barbaric that I believe that I have no alternative other than to impose upon both young prisoners, even despite their age, a life sentence. So grave is the nature of this case that I recommend that none of the prisoners in this matter should ever be released." Blessington was aged 14 at the time of the murder, his sentence was despite Australia being signatory to the Convention on the Rights of the Child, which explicitly prohibits imprisonment without the possibility of release as a punishment for children.
Matthew James Elliott	NSW	Murder; abduction; rape ×2; robbery ×2	Life imprisonment plus 25 years*	18	September 1990	*See Bronson Blessington sentencing remarks. Elliott was aged 16 at the time of the murder, his sentence is despite Australia being signatory to the Convention on the Rights of the Child, which explicitly prohibits imprisonment without the possibility of release as a punishment for children.
Stephen Wayne Jamieson	NSW	Murder; abduction; rape ×2; robbery ×2	Life imprisonment plus 25 years*	23	September 1990	*See Bronson Blessington sentencing remarks. While this order had no legally binding effect at that time, legislative changes passed through New South Wales parliament since have effectively extinguished any possibility of Jamieson receiving a determinate sentence or release on parole.
Phuong Canh Ngo	NSW	Murder	Life imprisonment	43	November 2001	When sentencing, Justice John Dunford ordered: "I am satisfied that the prisoner should remain under sentence for the remainder of his life... Phuong Canh Ngo for the murder of John Newman I sentence you to imprisonment for life."
Anthony Peter Sampieri	NSW	Kidnapping, sexual intercourse with a child under 10, indecent assault and wounding	Life imprisonment	56	12 February 2020	Deceased; died aged 57 of liver cancer whilst imprisoned at the Prince of Wales Hospital's Correctives Annex on 28 March 2021. When sentencing, Acting Justice Peter Conlon ordered: "My assessment is that each of the offences are so grave as to warrant the imposition of the maximum penalty... accordingly, I sentence you to life imprisonment."
Bruce Allan Burrell	NSW	Murder x2; Kidnapping	Life imprisonment plus 44 years	53	23 December 2005	Deceased; died aged 63 at the Prince of Wales Hospital's Correctives Annex on 4 August 2016 whilst incarcerated at Lithgow Correctional Centre. When sentencing in June 2006, Justice Graham Barr ordered: "for the [1997] murder of Kerry Patricia Whelan I sentence you to imprisonment for life. Your sentence will be taken to have commenced on 23 December 2005." Burrell was also sentenced in 2007 to a term of 28 years for the 1995 murder of Dorothy Davis.
John Walsh	NSW	Murder x4 and grievous bodily harm with intent to murder	3x Life imprisonment without parole and x2 Imprisonment plus 27 years	70	7 August 2009	When sentencing in 2009, Justice Lucy McCallum ordered for the murder of his wife and two grandchildren and intent to murder his daughter at Cowra on 29 June 2008: "For the murder of JH [granddaughter] you are convicted and sentenced to imprisonment for life. For the murder of KH [grandson] you are convicted and sentenced to imprisonment for life. For the offence of causing grievous bodily harm to SW [daughter] with intent to murder SW, you are convicted and sentenced to imprisonment with a non-parole period of 12 years... For the murder of JW [wife], you are convicted and sentenced to imprisonment with a non-parole period of 15 years" In 2018, Justice McCallum again sentenced Walsh for the offence of murdering a fellow inmate at Long Bay Correctional Centre with a sandwich press on 2 January 2017: "For the murder of Frank Townsend, you are convicted and sentenced to imprisonment for life."
Glen Patrick McNamara	NSW	Murder; supplying of a prohibited drug in an amount not less than a large commercial quantity	Life imprisonment plus 12 years	57	September 2016	When sentencing, Justice Geoffrey Bellew ordered: "In respect of the offence of the murder of Jamie Gao, the offender Glen Patrick McNamara is sentenced to life imprisonment."
Roger Caleb Rogerson	NSW	Murder; supplying of a prohibited drug in an amount not less than a large commercial quantity	Life imprisonment plus 12 years	75	September 2016	Deceased; died whilst incarcerated on 21 January 2024. When sentencing, Justice Geoffrey Bellew ordered: "In respect of the offence of the murder of Jamie Gao, the offender Roger Caleb Rogerson is sentenced to life imprisonment."
Mark Mala Valera	NSW	Murder ×2	2× life imprisonment	21	December 2000	When sentencing, Justice Timothy Studdert ordered: "Mark Mala Valera for the murder of David John O'Hearn I sentence you to imprisonment for life. For the murder of Francis Neville Arkell, I also sentence you to imprisonment for life. I do not set a non parole period for either sentence".
Sef Gonzales	NSW	Murder ×3	3× life imprisonment	24	September 2004	When sentencing, Justice James ordered: "I have noted that the prisoner did not plead guilty, that he did not provide any assistance to the authorities and, on the contrary, persistently endeavoured to mislead them, and that he has not shown any contrition... On the three charges of murder I sentence the prisoner to concurrent sentences of imprisonment for life".
Andrew Peter Garforth	NSW	Murder	Life imprisonment plus 30 years	29	July 1993	
Crespin Adanguidi	NSW	Murder ×3	3× life imprisonment	27	June 2005	When sentencing, Justice Graham Barr ordered: "I am satisfied that the level of the offender's culpability is so extreme that the community interest in retribution, punishment, community protection and deterrence can only be met through the imposition of the maximum sentence for each offence... For the murder of Shiquin Zhu I sentence you to imprisonment for life. For the murder of Pin Shen I sentence you to imprisonment for life. For the murder of Christy Bo Shen I sentence you to imprisonment for life."
Ramzi Aouad	NSW	Murder ×2	2× life imprisonment	25	November 2006	Darwiche–Razzak–Fahda family conflict. Originally sentenced to three terms of life without parole, for three murders; successfully appealed against one murder conviction in April 2011
Allan Baker	NSW	Murder; conspiracy to murder; malicious wounding with intent to prevent lawful apprehension ×2	Life imprisonment plus 55 years hard labour	26	June 1974	See Kevin Crump sentencing remarks.
Kevin Garry Crump	NSW	Murder; conspiracy to murder; malicious wounding with intent to prevent lawful apprehension ×2	Life imprisonment plus 55 years hard labour	25	June 1974	When sentencing, Justice Robert Taylor ordered: "You have outraged all accepted standards of the behaviour of men. The description of 'men' ill becomes you. You would be more aptly described as animals, and obscene animals at that... I believe that you should spend the rest of your lives in gaol and there you should die. If ever there was a case where life imprisonment should mean what it says – imprisonment for the whole of your lives – this is it. If, in the future, some application is made that you be released on the grounds of clemency or mercy, then, I would venture to suggest to those who are entrusted with the task that the measure of your entitlement should be on the grounds of clemency or mercy you extended to this woman [Morse] when she begged for her life". Crump's sentence was reduced to one term of life without parole plus 55 years on appeal in 1997
John Raymond Travers	NSW	Murder; taking with intent to hold for advantage; assault; robbery; wounding; inflicting actual bodily harm with the intent to have sexual intercourse; stealing a car	Life imprisonment plus 50 years	20	July 1987	Murder of Anita Cobby
Michael Patrick Murphy	NSW	Murder; taking with intent to hold for advantage; assault; robbery; wounding; inflicting actual bodily harm with the intent to have sexual intercourse; stealing a car	Life imprisonment plus 50 years	34	July 1987	Murder of Anita Cobby. Deceased; died in his cell whilst imprisoned at Long Bay Hospital on 21 February 2019 of complications of chronic viral liver disease.
Gary Stephen Murphy	NSW	Murder; taking with intent to hold for advantage; assault; robbery; wounding; inflicting actual bodily harm with the intent to have sexual intercourse; stealing a car	Life imprisonment plus 50 years	29	July 1987	Murder of Anita Cobby
Leslie Murphy	NSW	Murder; taking with intent to hold for advantage; assault; robbery; wounding; inflicting actual bodily harm with the intent to have sexual intercourse; stealing a car	Life imprisonment plus 48 years	23	July 1987	Murder of Anita Cobby
Michael James Murdoch	NSW	Murder; taking with intent to hold for advantage; assault; robbery; wounding; inflicting actual bodily harm with the intent to have sexual intercourse; stealing a car	Life imprisonment plus 50 years	20	July 1987	Murder of Anita Cobby
Malcolm George Baker	NSW	Murder ×6; attempted murder x1	6× life imprisonment plus 12 years	45	August 1993	Central Coast massacre. Deceased; died whilst incarcerated at Goulburn Correctional Centre on 22 June 2024
Samuel Leonard Boyd	NSW	Murder ×4; wounding with intent to murder	4× life imprisonment plus 25 years	29	January 1985	The life sentence for the conviction of wounding with intent to murder was reduced to 25 years on appeal in 1994
John Ernest Cribb	NSW	Murder ×3; rape ×3; kidnapping ×2; false imprisonment ×2; armed robbery ×9; escaping lawful custody	3× life imprisonment plus 45 years	28	May 1979	Deceased; died incarcerated at Goulburn Correctional Centre on 21 February 2018
Adnan Darwiche	NSW	Murder ×2; attempted murder; discharging a firearm with intent to do grievous bodily harm	2× life imprisonment plus 26 years	30	November 2006	Darwiche–Razzak–Fahda family conflict
John Wayne Glover	NSW	Murder ×6; attempted murder; robbery with wounding; robbery; indecent assault ×4; assault	6× Life imprisonment	58	November 1990	Deceased; died by suicide whilst incarcerated at Lithgow Correctional Centre on 9 September 2005
Matthew James Harris	NSW	Murder ×3; armed robbery	2× life imprisonment plus 40 years	31	1 December 1998	Originally sentenced to 40 years for each count of murder and 3 years for armed robbery with a non-parole period of 25 years; sentence increased on appeal in December 2000. In the Court of Criminal Appeal, Justice Andrew Bell ordered: "thereof the respondent should be sentenced to concurrent sentences of imprisonment for life, I would decline to fix a non parole period."
Michael Kanaan	NSW	Murder ×3; malicious wounding with intent to do grievous bodily harm ×4; discharging firearm with intent to prevent lawful apprehension; accessory to the fact after malicious wounding	3× life imprisonment plus 50 years and 4 months	26	31 October 2001	When sentencing, Justice Greg James ordered: "For each of the crimes of murder, the offender is sentenced to life imprisonment. For the offence of malicious wounding with intent to cause grievous bodily harm, the offender is sentenced to 25 years imprisonment. I decline to set a non-parole period."
Lindsay Robert Rose	NSW	Murder ×5; robbery ×2; conspiracy to pervert the course of justice; kidnapping; robbery while armed; maliciously destroying property by fire; malicious wounding; larceny; supplying a prohibited drug	5× life imprisonment plus 39 years	43	September 1998	When sentencing, the trial judge ordered: "This prisoner has indicated no contrition or remorse; he had admitted to the violent murder of five people, murders of revenge and gangland style and of opportunity. A submission was made for him that he should be entitled to 'see the light at the end of the tunnel': a light, I suppose, that to some extent can be compared to that which he extinguished so brutally in each of his victims. I am not prepared to accede to that submission. There is simply no warrant for leniency in this case even taking into account the burden of custody under protection and the 'positive' advanced for him - assistance to authorities - if given the weight sought, would result in a sentence disproportionate to the criminality."
Mark Lewis	NSW	Murder ×2	Life imprisonment x1 plus 18 years	58	June 2000	Deceased; died whilst incarcerated at Long Bay Prison Hospital on 19 February 2024, aged 86.
Naseam El-Zeyat	NSW	Murder ×2*	2× life imprisonment*	26	November 2006	Originally sentenced to three terms of Life imprisonment, for three murders; successfully appealed against one murder conviction in April 2011
Ivan Robert Marko Milat	NSW	Murder ×7; attempted murder; false imprisonment; robbery	7× life imprisonment plus 18 years	51	July 1996	Backpacker murders. Deceased; died incarcerated at Long Bay Correctional Centre's hospital on 27 October 2019
Katherine Mary Knight	NSW	Murder	Life imprisonment	46	November 2001	When sentencing Justice Barry O'Keefe ordered: "A crime of the kind committed by the prisoner calls for the maximum penalty the law empowers the court to impose. An examination of the cases referred to by counsel supports the view that I have formed, namely that the only appropriate penalty for the prisoner is life imprisonment and that parole should never be considered for her. The prisoner should never be released."
Leonard John Warwick	NSW	Murder ×3; exploding an explosive device which destroys or damages a building with intent to murder ×2; placing an explosive substance into a vehicle with intent to murder; maliciously placing an explosive substance near a building with intent to damage the building; maliciously, by an explosion, causing grievous bodily harm ×13	3× life imprisonment plus 100 years	73	September 2020	Deceased; died whilst incarcerated on 14 February 2025. When sentencing, Justice Peter Garling ordered: "I decline to fix any non-parole periods for any of these offences. That is because, in light of the three sentences of life imprisonment without parole, there is no utility in fixing, and therefore it is inappropriate to fix, any non‑parole periods for the other offences" and "The effect of these sentences is that you will spend the rest of your life in prison and will not be released."
Erin Trudi Patterson	Victoria	Murder ×3; attempted murder	3× Life Imprisonment plus 25 years	50	2 November 2023	Patterson's initial sentence in September 2025 included a non-parole period of 33 years. An appeal by the Victoria DPP resulted in the quashing of the non-parole period. In making this decision, Justices Peter Kidd, Stephen McLeish and Lesley Taylor of Victoria's Court of Appeal ordered that "the features of the offending... lead each of us to conclude that this is a case of such shocking criminality that it is inappropriate to fix a non-parole period."
Julian Knight	Victoria	Murder ×7; attempted murder ×46	7× life imprisonment, non-parole period 27 years.	21	November 1989	The original sentence included a finite non-parole period, however with judicial parole guidance this amounted to de facto life imprisonment without parole.: In 2014 the Parliament of Victoria legislated that Knight could only be granted parole if imminently dying or seriously incapacitated to the extent he could do no physical harm to any person and demonstrably posed no risk to the community. The Victorian Charter of Human Rights and Responsibilities was suspended for the purpose of this provision.; See also: Hoddle Street massacre
Michael Cardamone	Victoria	Murder; incitement to murder; breaching a prescribed condition of parole	Life imprisonment plus 8 years and three months	50	25 August 2017	When sentencing, Justice Lex Lasry remarked: "Your conduct in relation to the murder of Ms Chetcuti was extraordinarily vicious, callous and thoroughly unprovoked, the crime you committed was quite simply horrifying, depraved and disgusting." Justice Lasry then ordered: "on charge one, the murder of Karen Chetcuti, you are sentenced to be imprisoned for life. On charge 2, the charge of incitement to murder Eddie George, you are sentenced to be imprisoned for eight years. On the summary charge of breaching your parole, you are sentenced to the maximum penalty of three months' imprisonment" and "the total effective sentence is life imprisonment. I decline to set a minimum period." Cardomone tortured and then murdered his neighbour, Chetcuti, by burning her alive and then drove over her corpse in his car.
Leslie Alfred Camilleri	Victoria	Murder ×3	2× life imprisonment plus 28 years	29	April 1999	When sentencing, Justice Frank Vincent ordered: "You may never be released from prison. However, I consider that my duty is clear. Through your own actions, you have forfeited your right ever to walk among us again. You are sentenced to imprisonment for life on each count without the possibility of release on parole." In December 2013, Camilleri was sentenced to a further 28 years prison for his third murder conviction
Ashley Mervyn Coulston	Victoria	Murder ×3; armed robbery ×2; false imprisonment ×2; recklessly endangering life ×2; intentionally causing injury; assault; using a firearm to resist arrest	3× life imprisonment plus 7 years	38	September 1995	
Bandali Michael Debs	Victoria and New South Wales	Murder ×4	4× life imprisonment	49	February 2003	Sentenced by Justice Philip Cummins to two life sentences in February 2003 for the 1998 shooting murders of Victorian police officers Sergeant Gary Silk and Senior Constable Rodney Miller. Sentenced by Justice Stephen Kaye in June 2007 to an additional life sentence in Victoria for the murder of sex-worker Kristy Harty in 1997. Sentenced by Justice Robert Hulme in February 2012 for the murder of Donna Hicks in New South Wales in 1995.
Raymond Edmunds	Victoria	Murder ×2; rape ×6; attempted rape ×2; indecent assault ×3; assault causing bodily harm ×2; attempt to escape lawful custody and false imprisonment	2× life imprisonment plus 54 years 5 months	42	April 1986	Sentenced to 2× life plus 30 years for two murders and rapes in October 1986; received an additional 12 months for attempted prison escape in 1992, and 23 years and 5 months for further rapes in 2019
Paul Steven Haigh	Victoria	Murder ×6, armed robbery	6× life imprisonment + 60 years	23	November 1980	Haigh was convicted of the murder of an inmate in 1993 and sentenced to a further term of life imprisonment with a minimum term of 15 years
Peter Norris Dupas	Victoria	Murder ×3	3× life imprisonment	47	August 2000	First life imprisonment sentence imposed in August 2000, with Justice Frank Vincent ordering for the murder and mutilation of psychotherapist Nicole Patterson at Northcote on 19 April 1999: "At a fundamental level, as human beings, you [Dupas] present for us the awful, threatening and unanswerable question – how did you come to be as you are?" and "The sentence of the Court is that you be imprisoned for the rest of your natural life and without the opportunity for release on parole." The second life sentence was imposed in August 2004, with Justice Stephen Kaye ordering "for the murder of Margaret Josephine Maher at Somerton on 4 October 1997, you be imprisoned for the rest of your natural life and without the opportunity for release on parole." The third life sentence was originally imposed in August 2007, with Justice Philip Cummins ordering for the murder of Mersina Halvagis on 1 November 1997 at Fawkner Cemetery: "Your presence at the cemetery was typical of your evil: cunning, predatory and homicidal." and "you have no prospect of rehabilitation: none. You do not suffer from any mental illness. Rather, you are a psychopath driven by a hatred of women. For the murder of Mersina Halvagis, I sentence you to life imprisonment. I refuse to set any minimum term. Life means life". Dupas challenged and was awarded a retrial for Halvagis' murder; after being found guilty a second time, Justice Elizabeth Hollingworth ordered in 2010: "You are now aged 57. As a result of your own depraved conduct, in this case and others, you will live out the rest of your days in prison."
Robert Arthur Selby Lowe	Victoria	Murder; kidnapping	Life imprisonment plus 15 years	57	December 1994	Deceased; died whilst incarcerated at Hopkins Correctional Centre in 2021, aged 84. When sentencing, Justice Philip Cummins ordered: "What you did was every child's fear and every parent's nightmare" and "You are sentenced to imprisonment for life on the count of murder, with no minimum term. Life means life."
Stanley Brian Taylor	Victoria	Murder; intentionally causing serious injury ×2; causing an explosion; burglary; car theft; theft	Life imprisonment plus 13 years	50	August 1988	Deceased; died October 2016
John Justin Bunting	South Australia	Murder ×11	11× life imprisonment	37	October 2003	
Robert Joe Wagner	South Australia	Murder ×10	10× life imprisonment	31	October 2003	Wagner's application for a non-parole period to be set was denied in May 2019
Mark Errin Rust	South Australia	Murder ×2; rape; assault; gross indecency	2× life imprisonment plus 12 years	39	April 2004	Rust is subject to an Indefinite imprisonment order by the South Australian Government.
Rebecca Louise Mahony	QLD	Attempted murder; rape ×13; indecent treatment of a child under 16 ×6; assault occasioning bodily harm while armed and in company ×3; unlawfully procuring a child under 16 years to commit and indecent act; taking a child for immoral purposes; making child exploitation material; deprivation of liberty; common assault; stupefying in order to commit an indictable offence; torture; unlawfully wounding another	2× life imprisonment plus 80 years	32	December 2011	Mahoney's co-conspirator Andrew Shenfield was initially sentenced to life without parole, but his sentence was reduced to 18 years prison on appeal. Mahoney also appealed her sentence, but was denied and the original sentence upheld.
Barrie John Watts	QLD	Murder, rape, abduction	Life imprisonment plus 18 years	37	February 1990	
Dennis William Sore	QLD	Murder	Life imprisonment	43	February 2023	
Anthony Robert Harvey	WA	Murder ×5	5× life imprisonment	25	18 July 2019	When sentencing, Judge Stephen Hall ordered: "Anthony Robert Harvey, has been convicted on his pleas of guilty of five counts of murder. The State submits that the appropriate sentence in each case is imprisonment for life with an order that the offender never be released." Harvey is the first person in Western Australia to receive a 'never to be released' order for the murder of his wife, three children and mother-in-law at Bedford in 2018.
Benjamin Glenn Hoffmann	NT	Murder ×3; manslaughter; recklessly endangering life ×3; threatening to kill; drug possession	3× life imprisonment plus 15 years	48	October 2022	
Martin Leach	NT	Murder ×2; rape; assaulting a police officer	3× life imprisonment plus 3 months	25	May 1984	Deceased; died on 7 August 2024 whilst incarcerated aged 65.
Andrew Christopher Albury	NT	Murder	Life imprisonment	22	July 1984	
William Turner	NT	Various sexual assaults, including sexual assaults against children	Indefinite imprisonment plus nine years	52	May 2008	
Martin John Bryant	Tasmania	Murder ×35; attempted murder ×20; grievous bodily harm ×3; wounding ×8; aggravated assault ×4; unlawful setting fire to property; arson	35× life imprisonment plus 1,652 years	29	November 1996	Port Arthur massacre
Allen Douglas Thompson	ACT	Murder ×6	6× Life imprisonment	24	October 1984	Thompson received four life sentences for the 1984 murders of Radmila Milosevic, her partner Tony Baker and their two children Daniel and Lisa. In 1986, Thompson was sentenced to a further two life sentences for murdering his girlfriend Mirjana Milosevic and Ljiliana Milosevic (sisters of Radmila) in 1981.
Abuzar Sultani	NSW	Murder ×3	3× Life imprisonment	32	December 2021	When sentencing, Justice Desmond Fagan ordered: "For each of the murders of Michael Davey at Kingswood on 30 March 2016, Mehmet Yilmaz at St Marys on 9 September 2016, and Pasquale Barbaro at Earlwood on 14 November 2016, Abuzar Sultani is sentenced to imprisonment for life".
Siar Munshizada	NSW	Murder ×3	3× Life imprisonment	33	December 2021	When sentencing, Justice Desmond Fagan ordered: ""For each of the murders of Michael Davey at Kingswood on 30 March 2016, Mehmet Yilmaz at St Marys on 9 September 2016, and Pasquale Barbaro at Earlwood on 14 November 2016, Siar Munshizada is sentenced to imprisonment for life".
Patricia Margaret Byers	QLD (incarcerated in South Australia)	Murder, attempted murder	Life imprisonment plus 12 years		1999	
Lloyd Clark Fletcher	QLD	Murder, rape, abduction	Life imprisonment, indefinite sentence	40	1998	
Wayne Edward Butler	QLD	Murder	Life imprisonment	57	13 February 2001	When sentencing, Justice John Helman ordered: for the murder of Celia Douty in 1983: "For this savage crime you will spend the rest of your days in captivity. Parole will always be out of the question."
Daniel James Holdom	NSW	Murder x2	x2 Life imprisonment	44	30 November 2018	When sentencing, Justice Robert Hulme ordered: "I am satisfied beyond reasonable doubt that [Holdom's] culpability is so extreme, and that his crimes are of a level of heinousness, that no objective or subjective factors mitigates the need to impose the ultimate sentence... For the murder of Karlie Jade Pearce-Stevenson the offender is sentenced to imprisonment for life. For the murder of Khandalyce Kiara Pearce the offender is sentenced to imprisonment for life."
Michael Allan Jacobs	NSW	Murder of Police Officer	Life imprisonment (mandatory sentence)	49	4 October 2013	When sentencing, Justice Richard Button ordered: "Because of his possession of a handgun on the morning of 2 March 2012, one life - that of Senior Constable David Rixon BM VA - has been irrevocably taken. Another life - that of Michael Jacobs - has been ruined. you are convicted of the offence of murder. I sentence you to imprisonment for life."
Robert Theo Sievers	NSW	Murder	Life imprisonment	58	18 December 2002	Deceased; died whilst incarcerated at Long Bay Prison Hospital on 12 May 2023, aged 81. When sentencing, Justice Brian Sully ordered for the stabbing murder of Michelle Campbell in July 2000: "for the crime of murder of which you have been convicted and for which you now stand for sentence, you are sentenced to life imprisonment." Sievers had previously been convicted and sentenced to life imprisonment for the 1980 murder of his estranged wife; that sentence was redetermined by Justice James Wood to 12.5 years with an additional term of 5 years in 1992.
Daryl Francis Suckling	NSW	Murder	Penal servitude for life	60	2 September 1996	Deceased; died whilst incarcerated at Long Bay Prison Hospital on 30 August 2021, aged 84 for the murder of Jodie Larcombe in 1987. Appealing his conviction in 1999, orders were reaffirmed that Suckling's "sentence imposed is to be served for the term of the appellant's natural life".
Vester Allan Fernando	NSW	Murder x2; Aggravated sexual assault x1	Life imprisonment plus 40 years	27	21 August 1997	Sentenced by Justice Allan Abadee in 1997 to life imprisonment without parole plus 10 years for the rape and murder of nurse Sandra Hoare at Wallgett in 1994. His appeals of his sentence, represented by the Aboriginal Legal Service to both the Court of Criminal Appeal and High Court of Australia, were both refused. Fernando was subsequently sentenced by Justice Roderick Howie to a term of 30 years imprisonment with a non-parole period of 22 years for the stabbing murder of his cousin, Brendan Fernando, whilst both were incarcerated at Lithgow Correctional Centre in 1999. Vester Fernando is considered one of New South Wales' most dangerous prisoners and is currently imprisoned at Goulburn Correctional Centre's Supermax.
Walter Ciaran Marsh	NSW	Murder	Life imprisonment	49	19 May 2010	When sentencing, Justice Derek Price ordered: "for the murder of Michelle Beets, you are convicted. I sentence you to imprisonment for life." Marsh appealed his life sentence and was refused by the Court of Criminal Appeal in 2015.
Daniel Leslie Miles	NSW	Murder; Escape from lawful custody	Life imprisonment	29	25 April 2005	Miles murdered Yolande Adivira Michael at Sefton whilst an escapee from prison in 1999. When sentencing, Justice Paul Stein presiding in the Court of Criminal Appeal re-sentenced Miles, ordering: "I would propose that the sentence imposed by Justice Hidden be quashed and in lieu thereof the respondent should be sentenced to imprisonment for life." At the time of the murder of Yolande Michael, Miles was an incarcerated at John Moroney Correctional Centre where he was serving an 18-year sentence with a non-parole period of 12.5 years for the murder of Donna Newland in 1990.
David Lionel John Coulter	NSW	Murder	Life imprisonment	42	15 March 2004	When sentencing, Justice Greg James ordered for the murder of Hannah Richter, aged 11: "The offender has never denied his guilt, though he has consistently claimed not to remember the mutilation. He has expressed his remorse and pleaded guilty on the first listing of the matter in the Supreme Court... I sentence you to life imprisonment to date from 15 March 2004, the date on which you went into custody."
Allan Geoffrey O'Connor	NSW	Murder x3	3x Life imprisonment	61	28 June 2015	When sentencing, Justice Robert Hulme ordered: "Allan O'Connor did not simply intend to kill – he intended to blast every essence of life from each of his victims by discharging his shotgun at their chest or head at close range, thereby to cause the most horrific injuries imaginable... For each of the murders of Rebecca Webb, Stephen Cumberland and Jacob Cumberland, the offender is convicted. Upon each conviction he is sentenced to imprisonment for life."

== See also ==
- Punishment in Australia
