= Crime Investigation Australia =

Television series

- Genre: Crime/Factual
- Presented by: Steve Liebmann; Matt Doran
- Country of origin: Australia
- Original language: English
- No. of seasons: 4
- No. of episodes: 44

Production
- Executive producer: Graham McNeice
- Running time: 60 minutes; some episodes 90 minutes (including commercials)

Original release
- Network: Crime + Investigation (Pay TV); Nine Network (free-to-air)
- Release: 2005 – 2009
- Release: 2018 – 2023

Crime Investigation Australia is an Australian true-crime series that first premiered on pay TV provider Foxtel's Crime + Investigation (originally Crime & Investigation Network) in August 2005. The series was also rebroadcast on the free to air Nine Network, and made its debut there on 14 August 2007. The original host of the series was Steve Liebmann and is currently on Channel 7 with host Matt Doran.

== Production ==
The series was produced by Graham McNeice who resided in Moore Park, New South Wales and was director of Shadow Productions, until his death in 2024. In a 2008 interview, McNeice said the impetus for the series was to provide an element of local content to a channel (CI) that is dominated by American and European crime stories. Foxtel announced that the series would be "rested" for 2010, however, it never returned.

The series included interviews from victims, families, investigators, lawyers, and journalists. The crimes were further reviewed using original media and police audio and video footage alongside re-enactments and interviews shot in the same locations where the crimes took place.

== Episodes ==
=== Series 1 ===
1. No More Grannies – The Granny Killer
2. Kid for Ransom/Tears for Daniel
3. Death in a Heartbeat/The Body in the Bag
4. Ivan Milat: The Backpacker Murders
5. Contract to Kill/The Mornington Monster
6. The Moorhouse Horrors/The Call Girl Killing
7. The Killer Punch/The Will of Death
8. The Anita Cobby Murder
9. Snowtown: Bodies in the Barrels
10. The Kimberley Killer
11. The Wanda Beach Murders/The Beaumont Children Mystery
12. The Greenough Family Massacre
13. The Disappearance of Donald Mackay
14. The Body in the Sports Bag
15. The Assassination of John Newman
16. The Butchered Boys

=== Series 2 ===
1. The Killing Fields of Truro
2. No Mercy: The Killing of Virginia Morse
3. The Night Caller: Eric Edgar Cooke
4. Headless Body: The Kim Barry Murder
5. The Gonzales Family Murders
6. Thrill Kill: The Janine Balding Murder
7. Hunt for a Killer: The Claremont Murders
8. The Devil Inside – John Ernest Cribb
9. The Predator: Leonard John Fraser
10. Evil Heart: The Murder of Donna Wheeler/The Disappearance of Trudie Adams

=== Series 3 ===
1. The Girls Who Knew Too Much (Juanita Nielsen and Sallie-Anne Huckstepp)
2. Bloodsport – The Bondi Gay Murders
3. A Killer Amongst Us – The Norfolk Island Murder
4. Night of Terror: The Bega Schoolgirls
5. Murder of Innocence – Sian Kingi
6. Date with a Serial Killer: Rodney Cameron
7. Cop Killer – The Winchester Assassination
8. Michael Kanaan: Shoot to Kill
9. Buried Alive: Luckman and Reid
10. Mystery of the Homestead Murders

=== Series 4 ===
1. Cangai siege
2. Kerry Whelan – Wife for ransom
3. Body in the suitcase – Karlie Pearce-Stevenson and Khandalyce Pearce
4. Catching A Killer - The Claremont Murders.
5. Almost a perfect murder – Bill & Pamela Weightman
6. Murder & Mayhem – George Brown and Fine Cotton
7. On Borrowed Time – The Michael McGurk Assassination
8. Hero To Hitman – Lindsey Rose

== Reception ==
The show was generally well received. Michelle Nagy in her Editorial Review of the program writes:

”Crime Investigation Australia presents an impressive package, using re-enactments, montages of real evidence, locations, maps, photos and real footage – not to mention leading Australian anchor Steve Liebmann, who lends weight and integrity to the series."

Similarly:

“...McNeice's films skilfully dramatise the stories behind these cases, though in disturbing the past he sometimes creates a sense of dismay... McNeice, with his just-the-facts method, unashamedly gives us criminality, violence, gritty realism, horror and psychopathology. There is no apology and no shame here, which is what makes it such riveting TV."

A recent review by David Knox explains that:

"...it shies away from emotive, sometimes even racist, sensationalism of other players. CIA has also triggered viewers to come forth with new information – surely a measure of success for any in this genre."

Another review states:

"Crime Investigation Australia has all the hallmarks of a pay-TV documentary – lots of stock footage, dodgy re-enactments, eerie music and talking heads – but nevertheless tells an engaging tale."

The re-enactments featured on the show are often explicit, as for example the Anita Cobby episode in which the moment of the murder is replayed over and over again. There are also inaccuracies and anachronisms, for example in the Beaumont Children Mystery episode where the hairstyles and hair lengths of the child actresses playing Jane and Arnna Beaumont do not match photographs of the real children and Jane is wearing a 2006-era pink "Speedo" female child's swimsuit instead of a period-accurate little girl's swimsuit.

== Revival ==
In 2018, Channel 7 began re-broadcasting some but not all of the original episodes originally hosted by Steve Liebmann on Foxtel and Channel 9. It was re branded Crime Investigation Australia: Most Infamous. This new series is hosted by Matt Doran. Doran revised the original series with new information and updates on particular cases and new episode voice narration for each episode to replace Steve Liebmann's voice used in the previous episodes during their Foxtel and Channel 9 airing. It is listed as a separate series from Crime Investigation Australia and is still available on 7 Plus In Australia.

In 2022, Season 4 of Crime Investigation Australia premiered on Channel 7 with new crimes investigated, again with Doran as host.

Episode 4 was aired on 19 April 2023, later than all other S04 episodes that aired in 2022. This episode hiatus was to coincide with the premiere Two part drama series shown on Channel 7/7 Plus titled The Claremont Murders in April 2023 which airing on the 10 and 17 April 2023 respectively. This Episode 4 is an additional, updated episode with further case developments than the Claremont episode from Season 2, Episode 7 which was released in 2008, 15 years earlier.

== See also ==
- List of Australian television series
- Crime in Australia
