= Allan Baker and Kevin Crump =

Two Australian criminals

Allan Baker
- Born: 16 January 1948
- Status: Incarcerated
- Convictions: Murder, rape and conspiracy to murder
- Penalty: Life imprisonment plus 30 years hard labour

Details
- Victims: Ian James Lamb (43), Virginia Gai Morse (34)
- Span of crimes: 3 – 13 November 1973
- Injured: Snr Cst. Bill Millward
- Weapons: .308 rifle, .222 rifle
- Date apprehended: 13 November 1973, Woodville, New South Wales
- Imprisoned at: Clarence Correctional Centre
- Maximum Security

Kevin Garry Crump
- Born: 1 October 1949
- Died: 23 November 2023 (aged 74); Wuuluman, New South Wales, Australia
- Convictions: Murder, rape and conspiracy to murder
- Penalty: Life imprisonment plus 30 years hard labour

Details
- Victims: Ian James Lamb (43), Virginia Gai Morse (34)
- Span of crimes: 3 – 13 November 1973
- Injured: Snr Cst. Bill Millward
- Weapons: .308 rifle, .222 rifle
- Date apprehended: 13 November 1973, Woodville, New South Wales
- Imprisoned at: Wellington Correctional Centre
- Maximum Security

Allan Baker and Kevin Crump are an Australian duo of rapists and double murderers who were sentenced to life imprisonment in 1974. Baker is serving his sentence at Clarence Correctional Centre whereas Crump died incarcerated at Wellington Correctional Centre in 2023.

== Crimes ==
Crime locations in New South Wales & Queensland

Allan Baker and Kevin Crump were convicted criminals who met in prison while serving sentences for such offences as breaking and entering and larceny. After they were released, they met up and opted for a life of robbing for a living and murder.

Their new life began on 3 November 1973 when, while driving a stolen vehicle, Baker used a .308 rifle to murder Ian James Lamb, 43. Lamb was sleeping in his car next to the road to save accommodation costs while he was in the area to look for seasonal work. The pair did not know Lamb, and the murder has been described as a thrill killing. After Lamb died, they stole $30, some clothes, and petrol, then moved the car.

Three days later, Baker and Crump camped near the home of Brian and Virginia Morse in Collarenebri, where Baker had previously worked as a migrant farm labourer. After watching the house for two days, they abducted 34-year-old Virginia Morse when her husband and three children left the property. They also refueled at the farm’s bowser.

The men drove via back roads towards Queensland, stopping at hotels and garages along the way and buying beer and petrol with the $30 they had stolen from the Morse homestead. They drove mainly at night to avoid detection. During the journey, Morse sobbed and pleaded for her life. The men stopped south of the Queensland border, tied Morse to a tree and took turns raping her repeatedly. They then threw her back in the car and continued on their journey.

When they stopped by the Weir River near Moonie, they bound Morse's hands in front of her with handkerchiefs. They raped and tortured her repeatedly before Crump shot her between the eyes in an execution style killing on the 8th of November 1973 using a .222 rifle. After interfering with the body, they rolled her corpse into the river, burnt her clothes, and drove back to their campsite.

== Arrest ==
On 13 November, ten days after Lamb's murder, Baker and Crump headed towards the Hunter Region, intending to commit a burglary. However, after their stolen vehicle was spotted near Maitland, the pair took flight from the scene. A police vehicle responding to the attempted burglary intercepted their vehicle en route and a high speed chase ensued. The police car was rammed and run off the road and the chase taken up by a second police unit. A police officer in this vehicle was seriously wounded when the fugitives shot him in the face. The chase culminated at a police roadblock at Woodville, where the pair ran off, shooting at police as they fled into the bush. An intensive ground and air search of the area followed and the two men were arrested in a nearby river three hours later.

After their capture, Crump tried to evade responsibility for Morse's murder in his police statement. "I was forced to kill Mrs. Morse by Baker because he wanted me to be in as deep as him. He said he was going to kill me if I didn't. I admit that I was prepared to kidnap Mrs. Morse and even to sleep with her, but once again, as with Mr. Lamb, I did not want to be a part of her death... It was a choice of either me or Mrs. Morse."

Even though there was compelling evidence that Crump had murdered Morse, he was not charged with this crime, as she had been murdered in Queensland, outside the jurisdiction of the Government of New South Wales. He was charged with the murder of Lamb and with rape and conspiracy to murder Morse.

== Trial ==
Baker and Crump were tried in the Supreme Court of NSW before Justice Robert Lindsay Taylor. At their trial, they pleaded not guilty to the four charges of murdering Lamb, conspiracy to murder Morse, maliciously wounding a police officer with intent to prevent lawful apprehension and shooting at police with intent to prevent lawful apprehension. It took the jury an hour and 45 minutes to convict Baker and Crump on all charges. Baker showed no emotion at the verdict, while Crump appeared to stare at the floor and shudder.

Details of the torture Morse endured at the hands of Baker and Crump were suppressed during the trial as the information was deemed too graphic and disturbing for the public.

=== Sentencing remarks ===
Justice Taylor sentenced both men to two terms of life imprisonment on the charges of murder and conspiracy to murder; plus 15 years for each of the two counts of malicious wounding. The Justice's sentencing remarks are often revised and delivered by other Justices in similar cases and are widely quoted when the case of Baker and Crump is re-reported in the Australian media:

"You have outraged all accepted standards of the behaviour of men. The description of 'men' ill becomes you. You would be more aptly described as animals, and obscene animals at that... I believe that you should spend the rest of your lives in gaol and there you should die. If ever there was a case where life imprisonment should mean what it says – imprisonment for the whole of your lives – this is it. If, in the future, some application is made that you be released on the grounds of clemency or mercy, then, I would venture to suggest to those who are entrusted with the task that the measure of your entitlement should be on the grounds of clemency or mercy you extended to this woman [Morse] when she begged for her life"

— Justice Robert Taylor, 1974

== Parole, legislation and court appeals ==
In 1997, Crump successfully applied to the Supreme Court of NSW to convert his life sentence into a minimum term and an additional term. Peter McInerney sentenced Crump to a minimum term of 30 years and an additional term for the remainder of his life.

In response to this determination, the Parliament of New South Wales passed legislation that was intended to ensure that ten named individuals remained incarcerated for the rest of their lives. The people named in Parliament were Baker and Crump, together with Michael Murphy, Leslie Murphy, Gary Murphy, John Travers and Michael Murdoch, who were convicted of the murder of Anita Cobby; and Stephen Jamieson, Matthew Elliot and Bronson Blessington, who were convicted of the murder of Janine Balding. The legislation required the Parole Board to give substantial weight to the recommendations, observations and comments made by the original sentencing court.

Baker challenged this legislation in the High Court of Australia, arguing that it was invalid and incompatible with the integrity, independence and impartiality of the Supreme Court. In October 2004, the High Court rejected his challenge, holding that there was nothing repugnant to the notion of judicial power in requiring significant weight be given to a past judicial recommendation.

The effect of the 1997 determination by McInerney was that Crump had some prospect, however minimal, of being released on parole after November 2003. In 2001, the Parliament of NSW passed further legislation that was intended to ensure that Baker, Crump and other never-to-be-released prisoners could only ever be released on their deathbeds or if they were so incapacitated that they would pose a threat to nobody. In 2003, Crump sought parole; however, this was rejected by the Parole Board due to the 2001 legislation. In May 2012, the High Court rejected Crump's challenge to the 2001 legislation despite the ad hominem component of legislation apparent in the Second Reading Speech.

In February 2016, the NSW Court of Criminal Appeal dismissed Crump's application for leave to appeal the 1997 sentence determination of McInerney.

== Media ==
The crime was depicted in an episode of the documentary series Crime Investigation Australia.

== See also ==
- Murder of Anita Cobby
- Murder of Janine Balding
- Murder of Ebony Simpson
- Murder of Lauren Barry & Nichole Collins
- Murder of Sian Kingi
