= Murder of Janine Balding =

Australian murder case

- Janine Balding
- Date: 8 September 1988
- Venue: Minchinbury
- Convicted: Matthew James Elliott (aged 16); Bronson Matthew Blessington (aged 14); Stephen Wayne 'Shorty' Jamieson (aged 22); Wayne Lindsay Wilmot (aged 15); Carol Ann Arrow (aged 15)
- Convictions: Murder
- Sentence: Life imprisonment plus 25 years
- Publication bans: Four of those convicted were minors at the time of the offence, and their names suppressed

Janine Kerrie Balding was a homicide victim who was abducted, raped and murdered by a homeless gang of five (four youths and an adult) on 8 September 1988 in Sydney, New South Wales, Australia. Balding's murder is often compared to the 1986 murder of Sydney nurse Anita Cobby.

== Early life ==
Balding was born on 7 October 1967 and lived in Wagga Wagga, New South Wales before moving to Sydney and gaining employment as a teller at a branch of the then State Bank of New South Wales on George Street. She was due to marry her fiancé Steven Moran in March 1989. The couple had purchased a house in Berkeley Vale, approximately 90 km (56 mi) north of Sydney, and rented out that house to help finance their wedding.

== Abduction and murder ==
A month before her twenty-first birthday, she was abducted from a Sutherland railway station car park by a group of homeless persons consisting of four males and one female.

These persons were Bronson Blessington, Matthew Elliott, Stephen 'Shorty' Jamieson (born 29 December 1965), Wayne Wilmot and Carol Ann Arrow.

Blessington had met Jamieson and Elliott at a homeless shelter named 'The Station' in the Sydney CBD earlier that day and had proposed "Why don't we get a sheila and rape her?", a quote which became notoriously known through Australian news media. The idea was agreed to. Arrow and Wilmot joined in. The victim, who was to be picked at random, became Balding. The gang of five had earlier approached another woman—Christine Moberley—at the same car park, but she became concerned and quickly locked herself in her vehicle and drove home where she told her partner that the offenders were talking with another woman near a motor vehicle there. That person was Janine Balding. Upon being alerted to these incidents, police immediately attended the main Sutherland railway station car park, not realising that the earlier encounters had happened in an overflow dirt car park on the opposite side of the rail line. Janine Balding had been abducted from that overflow car park in the intervening period.

She was driven in her vehicle to the side of the F4 Freeway at Minchinbury in Sydney's west, and during that time was partially stripped of her clothing and raped at knifepoint by Blessington, Jamieson, and Elliott. Arrow and Wilmot were in the car but did not rape her. On arrival at Minchinbury, she was again raped. She was then dragged from her vehicle, gagged with a scarf, hog-tied, then lifted over a fence and carried into a paddock by Blessington, Jamieson, and Elliott. She was then held down and drowned in a dam on the property.

== Convictions ==
- Matthew James Elliott, aged 16 at the time of the murder
- Bronson Matthew Blessington, aged 14 at the time of the murder
- Stephen Wayne 'Shorty' Jamieson, aged 22 at the time of the murder
- Wayne Lindsay Wilmot, aged 15 at the time of the murder
- Carol Ann Arrow, aged 15 at the time of the murder

All five members of the group were arrested and charged with Balding's murder. After weeks of deliberations and testimonies, Elliott, Blessington and Jamieson were each given life sentences plus 25 years. Wilmot was sentenced to seven-and-a-half years in jail while Arrow was released on a good behaviour bond, as the pair did not physically participate in the rape and murder.

The sentencing of Blessington and Elliot became a topic of extreme controversy, because at the time they committed the murder and were sentenced, they were aged 14 and 16, respectively—becoming the youngest killers in Australia to be convicted and given the maximum sentence for murder.

In sentencing the defendants, Justice Newman said:

"To sentence people so young to a long term of imprisonment is of course a heavy task. However, the facts surrounding the commission of these crimes are so barbaric that I believe I have no alternative other than to impose upon [these] young prisoners, even despite their age, a life sentence. So grave is the nature of this case that I recommend that none of the prisoners in the matter should ever be released."

This trial was the first in Australian legal history where DNA evidence was tendered - leading to convictions based in part on that evidence. DNA samples were conveyed to a laboratory in the United Kingdom, which at the time was a world leader in DNA analysis, profiling and comparison. The two scientists from that laboratory who processed the DNA samples were brought to Australia to give evidence in relation to their analyses. Given its significance in being the first time DNA evidence was tendered in an Australian court, the presiding Judge acceded to a request from the Crown Prosecutor that Police witnesses who were involved in the prosecution case be allowed to be in court prior to giving their evidence, to witness this history-making production of DNA evidence. Defense counsel did not object.

In 2007, Elliott and Blessington were granted an additional appeal based on a staple missing from their files. Essentially, it was argued, because the Crown indictment was not stapled to the court file, it was not "fixed" to the court file as required by law and the judgement was therefore not technically finalised. The High Court of Australia subsequently rejected this ground of appeal.

In an article published in The Sydney Morning Herald, the crime was classified as a thrill killing.

== Sentences ==
Defendant	From	Convictions	Notes
Stephen Wayne Jamieson		Murder	Sentenced to life imprisonment plus 25 years
Matthew James Elliott		Murder	Sentenced to life imprisonment plus 25 years
Bronson Matthew Blessington		Murder	Sentenced to life imprisonment plus 25 years
Wayne Lindsay Wilmot		Accessory to murder	Sentenced to nine years and four months' imprisonment (later extended by six months for escaping lawful custody, and served 7½ years before being paroled. Currently incarcerated for multiple parole violations).
Carol Ann Arrow		Accessory to murder	Sentenced to a three-year good behaviour bond plus 19 months of time served in custody

== Imprisonment ==
Stephen Jamieson is currently housed in Lithgow Correctional Centre in maximum security. Jamieson has spent time in Long Bay, Goulburn and Lithgow.

Bronson Blessington is currently housed in South Coast Correctional Centre in maximum security. Blessington had spent time in Minda Juvenile Centre prior to his 18th birthday after that he has spent time in Long Bay, Maitland, Goulburn, Kempsey and Nowra.

Matthew Elliott is currently housed in Lithgow Correctional Centre in maximum security. Prior to his 19th birthday he had spent time at the Minda Juvenile Centre after that he has spent time in Goulburn, Special Purpose Unit (Long Bay), Cooma, Junee and Lithgow.

Wayne Wilmot is currently being held on remand after being charged on 21 June 2024 by NSW Police's Sex Crimes Squad with breaching a court order. Wilmot had previously been due for release in 2019 but the NSW Government blocked his release due to nature of his crimes outside and inside prison, failing to understand the concepts of his crimes and fears that he is too dangerous to be released. His release was rejected in 2019, 2021 and 2023. He was finally released under strict supervision in June 2024, but less than two weeks later he was re-arrested after a search of his phone found that he had been searching online for child abuse material. Wilmot has spent time in Sliverwater, Lithgow, Goulburn, Metropolitan Special Program Centre (Long Bay) and Junee.

== Further developments ==
In 1998, Wilmot returned to prison for seven years after an attempted abduction and rape of a young girl in Western Sydney just two years after being released for time served over the accessory to murder of Balding. Wilmot was then linked to an earlier attack on a 19-year-old woman at Leightonfield, New South Wales after undertaking a DNA testing program for prisoners.

In 2003, the NSW Innocence Project (a joint project by the NSW Police Force, the Office of the Director of Public Prosecutions and the Privacy Commissioner) used the latest DNA techniques to review the DNA evidence of the crime. This was done because Jamieson denied taking part in the murder, and one of the murderers had claimed that it was 'Shorty' Wells (rather than 'Shorty' Jamieson) who had committed the murder.

In February 2025 NSW Supreme Court Justice Ian Harrison ordered that unknown DNA profiles, that began appearing on the bandana used to gag Miss Balding when she was murdered, be compared against the DNA profile of Mark 'Shorty' Wells. Wells had been questioned by Homicide Squad detectives in 1988 and admitted that he was with the group that abducted Miss Balding. A homeless person at that time, he was considered an unreliable witness and was never charged with any crime against Miss Balding. When called as a witness at the murder trials Wells denied any involvement. The fight to have further testing done on the bandana was instigated by lawyer and former NSW politician Peter Breen, with the Crown resisting such a move on behalf of the NSW Police Commissioner and the NSW Attorney General. Mr Justice Harrison rejected the Crown's arguments stating that laws governing forensic procedures did not preclude it. The tests will be performed by the NSW Forensic and Analytical Science Service.

The DNA results demonstrated that Jamieson's DNA was not found in a rectal swab taken from the victim at autopsy, and neither was the DNA of Wells. Police Minister John Watkins announced that the NSW Innocence Project would be suspended. Arrow subsequently stated that Jamieson was one of the murderers.

Janine's mother Beverley co-wrote, with journalist Janette Fife-Yeomans, a book entitled The Janine Balding Story – A Journey Through A Mother's Nightmare, in which she relates how her family coped with the loss of Janine, of the police investigations and the lengthy trials. In October 2013—shortly after what would have been Janine's 46th birthday—and after suffering from and battling two and a half years of depression, Beverley Balding died after a short stay in hospital. She is buried alongside her daughter in the Wagga Lawn Cemetery.

In late October 2014, the United Nations Human Rights Committee ruled that the sentences of Blessington (14 when the crime was committed) and Elliott (16) breached the International Covenant on Civil and Political Rights and the UN Convention on the Rights of the Child. The Committee asked the Australian Government to "review the case and remedy the human rights breach".

In February 2016, Blessington lodged an appeal to be released from prison given he was only 14 at the time he committed the murder. Blessington claimed "he found God", that he was remorseful for his actions and was a changed man. Despite these claims, Janine's family reported that nearly three decades on from the murder, it had not received any formal apology or letter from Blessington expressing such remorse and did not believe he had changed.

== Media ==
An episode of the documentary series Crime Investigation Australia was devoted to the case.

== See also ==
- Allan Baker and Kevin Crump
- Bega schoolgirl murders
- List of kidnappings (1980–1989)
- List of solved missing person cases (1950–1969)
- Murder of Ebony Simpson
- Murder of Sian Kingi
- Thrill killing
