= Andy Albury =

Australian murderer (born 1961)

Andrew Christopher Albury, born 20 November 1961, is an Australian murderer serving two consecutive sentences of life imprisonment without parole.

== Crimes ==
Albury was convicted of murdering Gloria Pindan on 25 November 1983. Pindan, a 29-year-old indigenous woman, was murdered after a random encounter with the drunken Albury. Her body was found stripped with 28 external injuries, some inflicted with a broken beer bottle.

Albury also confessed to the killing of Patricia Carlton who was fatally assaulted on the night of 30 September 1983, but later recanted the confession (stating it was coerced) at the trial of Kelvin Condren. Condren was convicted and served seven years before his conviction was quashed. It was later revealed Condren had been arrested for drunkenness and had been detailed in the police watchhouse at the time. Condren was later awarded $400,000 for the false conviction.

In 1990, Albury confessed to committing eleven other murders but an investigation concluded that the confession was fictional. In the same judgement, Dr. Wake, the medical director of Northern Territory Prisons, is quoted as saying: 'Albury enjoys his reputation of being a "monster" and cleverly invokes voices, the written word and behaviour patterns to perpetuate the idea that he is quite mad"'. In 1990, he received a consecutive sentence of detention in hospital for life after assaulting and attempting to strangle a fellow inmate.

On 12 November 2004, the NT Supreme Court approved an application by the NT director of public prosecutions for Albury's sentence to be altered to remain in prison for the rest of his natural life.

In February 2014, former Northern Territory Detective Sergeant Les Chapman, who arrested Albury in 1983, claimed that Albury had boasted to him of killing 14 other people in a spree while he moved from Townsville to Mount Isa between 1970 and 1982.
