= John Walsh (murderer) =

Australian serial killer (born 1939)

- Born: 1939 (age 86–87); Northern Ireland, United Kingdom
- Known for: Familicide
- Spouse: Jean Walsh (dec.)
- Children: 3
- Status: Imprisoned at Long Bay Correctional Centre
- Motive: Undeterminable
- Convictions: (4) Murder, (1) grievous bodily harm with intent to murder

Details
- Victims: 5 (1 survived)
- Span of crimes: 2008–2017
- Country: Australia
- State: New South Wales
- Weapons: Axe, hammer, knife and drowning
- Date apprehended: 30 June 2008 at Hay, New South Wales

John Walsh (born 1939) is an Irish−Australian mass-murderer convicted of the murder of three immediate family members in 2008 and a fellow inmate whilst imprisoned at Long Bay Correctional Centre in 2017.

Walsh's pleaded guilty in the Supreme Court of New South Wales to four counts of murder and one count of grievous bodily harm with intent to murder and was sentenced to three sentences of life without the possibility of parole as well as two additional sentences totalling 27 years for his crimes. He is considered one of Corrective Services New South Wales' most dangerous prisoners and is never to be released from prison.

== Life ==
Walsh was married to Scottish-Australian Jean Walsh (born 1955) and had three children; 2 sons and 1 daughter (Shelly Walsh) with one son (Scott Walsh) having died from suicide in 2002. John Walsh was described during sentencing to have "had regular employment throughout his adult life".

At the time of the murders, John and Jean Walsh lived at Brougham Street, Cowra in the Central West region of New South Wales.

=== Cowra murders ===
On 29 June 2008, Walsh's daughter, policewoman Shelly Walsh, who was stationed at Parkes, left her two children Kevin Hodges (aged 7) and Jamie Hodges (aged 5) in the care of her parents which was her regular arrangement whilst she worked nightshift. Shelly Walsh had divorced from her husband and the father of her children, former policeman Darrell Hodges, who lived in Newcastle.

During the night of 29–30 June, John Walsh without warning killed his wife and two grandchildren from a mixture of individual bludgeoning, stabbing, and drowning. He also killed the families pet dog in the bathtub. After killing his wife and grandchildren, Walsh typed a note on his computer which stated "Sorry that it had to end this way" and "I would like to have a go at Shelly's ex, I may even yet". At around 09:00am on 30 June, he went to his grandchildren's primary school and told staff that the children were sick and would probably not be able to attend school for a few days. He also withdrew $800.00 from an ATM and filled his car with petrol and returned to the house.

On Shelly Walsh's return to the house on the afternoon of 30 June, John Walsh made his daughter a cup of tea and attempted to kill her from behind by striking her head with an axe when she discovered her daughter was deceased in her and her elder brothers bunk bed. John Walsh stated to his daughter during the act that "I am doing this because I love you. When I am done with you lot I am going to Newcastle to kill your ex-husband. We are all better off this way. This is the way it has to be." Shelly Walsh was able to escape the house to a neighbours property where she contacted police. Shelly Walsh had suffered three lacerations to the head that required sutures. She also had a depressed fracture of the skull, underneath which the lining of the brain was torn. Part of her skull was replaced with titanium plates.

John Walsh left the house before police arrived and was later arrested on the same day by police at a motel in Hay, which was the opposite direction to Newcastle. After his arrest, Walsh told police that he regarded his wife’s death as “a mercy killing” but that “the other two are murder”.

At a hearing of the Supreme Court of New South Wales on 10 July 2009, Walsh plead guilty to the murders and intent to murder. At his sentencing on 7 August 2009, Justice Lucy McCallum in her judgement described the crimes as he "killed his young grandchildren when they had been entrusted to his care. He intended to kill them and planned their murders with grim attention" and that "the killings remain unexplained. The only reason stated by the offender for killing Jamie Hodges and Kevin Hodges is the baseless and arrogant assertion that his daughter would not have been able to care for them on her own. His acts were wicked in the extreme."

Justice McCallum sentenced John Walsh to two terms of life imprisonment without parole for the murders of his grandchildren and a term each of imprisonment for the murder of his wife and causing grievous bodily harm with intent to murder for his daughter.

On a 2013 televised episode of A Current Affair, Shelly Walsh was interviewed by Tracey Grimshaw and revealed she had visited her father in prison. During the visit, she asked him why he murdered their family and she stated "he just shrugged his shoulders and said 'I don't know why myself' – that was it, that was the answer". Upon leaving, the last words she said to him were "you won't be seeing me again". Jean Walsh, Kevin and Jamie Hodges were all buried together at Cowra General Cemetery after a funeral service attended by Commissioner of Police Andrew Scipione and over 200 mourners.

=== Long Bay murder ===
Whilst incarcerated within Long Bay prison's Kevin Waller Unit for aged and frail inmates, Walsh on the evening of 2 January 2017 beat his cell mate, Frank Townsend, in the head with a sandwich press for not turning their shared cell's television off. Townsend later died from cardiac arrest attributed to his injuries at St Vincent's Hospital.

At a hearing of the Supreme Court on 10 August 2018, Walsh pleaded guilty to the murder of Townsend. On 23 August of the same month, Walsh was again sentenced by Justice McCallum to life imprisonment without parole, stating: "The offender appears to acknowledge that he is dangerous. As already noted, he said he “works in cold rage” and that his mind “works without you even having to think about it".

Justice McCallum remarked during sentencing that she was "satisfied that the offender is not the least bit remorseful" and acknowledged that despite her now tasked with sentencing for the murder of Townsend, "the two life sentences I imposed in 2009, the offender has no entitlement to be released on parole at any time" whatever the case.

=== Health ===
Before his arrest in 2008, Walsh had a pronounced limp as a result of hip replacement surgery; he also had three titanium screws in his right shoulder due to separate surgery and is blind in one eye as a result of radiotherapy treatment also received before his arrest. He also suffers from partial deafness. In 2016, he was the victim of a serious assault in prison as a result of which he suffered a traumatic pneumothorax and facial fractures.

== Victims ==
#	Victim	Age	Relationship	Charge	Sentence
1	Jean Walsh	52	Wife	Murder	Imprisonment with a non-parole period of 15 years
2	Jamie Hodges	5	Granddaughter	Murder	Life imprisonment without parole
3	Kevin Hodges	7	Grandson	Murder	Life imprisonment without parole
4	Shelly Walsh	−	Daughter	Grievous bodily harm with intent to murder	Imprisonment with a non-parole period of 12 years
5	Frank Townsend	71	Cell mate	Murder	Life imprisonment without parole
