= Matthew James Harris =

Australian serial killer

- Born: 30 June 1968 (age 58); Wagga Wagga, New South Wales, Australia
- Conviction: Murder × 3
- Penalty: 2 × life imprisonment + 40 years

Details
- Victims: 3
- Span of crimes: 1 October – 3 November 1998
- Country: Australia
- State: New South Wales
- Date apprehended: 1 December 1998

Matthew James Harris (born 30 June 1968) is an Australian serial killer from Wagga Wagga, New South Wales, currently serving two sentences of life imprisonment plus 40 years' imprisonment without the possibility of parole for the murder of three people in and around Wagga Wagga in October and November 1998.

== The crimes ==
=== Robbery of Trang Nguyen: 20 June 1998 ===
Harris, along with Kenneth Scott Frazier, forced their way into Vietnamese immigrant Trang Nguyen's house, threatening her with a knife in front of her three children. They robbed her of $58 which they used to buy alcohol.

=== Murder of Peter Wennerbom: 1 October 1998 ===
Harris was friends with Elaine de Jong, who was the sister of 62-year-old Peter Wennerbom. On 1 October 1998 Harris forced his way into Wennerbom's house. He strangled Wennerbom to death. He later told police "He was an old man, there was no, no resistance at all. I had total, you know, control over the situation, he, he couldn't do anything".

=== Murder of Yvonne Ford: 17 October 1998 ===
On 17 October 1998 Harris went to the house of 33-year-old Yvonne Ford, who had a mild intellectual handicap. Harris later said he "Just went there...I was probably out on one of me walks and I probably had a few drinks, in the area so I just went went to the house, ended up there". Ford let him in, and after some time he made a sexual advance towards her. He later said "We struck up a bit of a friendship, as, just, just driving her around, and I obviously could tell she was lonely, she was slightly handicapped. I didn't come, I didn't come around here for sex, I didn't come around here for anything, I just came around to say Hello, I live nearby, but then these thoughts started entering my head that I wanted to kill her."' As they sat in the bath together, Harris strangled her and held her under the water for 3 or 4 minutes. "It could have been her, it could've been anybody. She was just unlucky...I just thought she would be easy, to target, she wouldn't put up a fight or ... she would be relatively easy to kill". Asked how he felt after the murder he said "powerful, angry, just anger, pure anger. Not, not that she, there was no sex or anything, I was angry at the world. This is why this whole thing has happened, has started, and it was just my total anger building up from, I don't know, from the day I was adopted, it's just all built and built and, and something has set, set me off and I, I killed her".

=== Murder of Ronald Galvin: 3 November 1998 ===
On 3 November 1998 Harris strangled his neighbour, Ronald Galvin. The following evening he borrowed Elaine de Jong's car and drove Galvin's body to nearby Uranquinty. His only explanation of this murder was "... I think it was just a lot of anger I was getting rid of and it was being projected on him".

== Suicide attempts ==
Harris overdosed twice on heroin a few days after Galvin's murder and in the early hours of 1 December 1998, the day of his arrest.

== Sentencing ==
On 3 December 1999 Harris pleaded guilty to the murders and the robbery of Trang Nguyen. On 7 April 2000 NSW Supreme Court Justice Virginia Bell sentenced Harris to 3 concurrent terms of 40 years' imprisonment with non-parole periods of 25 years in relation to the murders and 3 years' imprisonment in relation to the robbery, making him eligible for parole on 30 November 2023. She declined to sentence him to life imprisonment without parole due to his confessions and guilty pleas, and psychiatric evaluations finding that Harris had avoidant, schizoid and schizotypal personality disorder and could possibly be rehabilitated with psychological counselling.

On 2 May 2000 the matter was mentioned in the New South Wales Parliament where it was noted that "Harris in a police record of interview said "... to murder and to keep murdering and to get away with it was an achievement ... I'd still be going if I hadn't been caught."" and that the sentences were "far too lenient".

The Director of Public Prosecutions appealed against the murder sentences on the basis that they were inadequate. On 20 December 2000 the NSW Court of Criminal Appeal upheld the appeal and quashed Harris's sentences in relation to the murders of Ford and Galvin, substituting them with life sentences without parole. Justice Wood, Chief Judge at Common Law, noted that "I am of the view that the criminality of the respondent, and the level of his dangerousness, are such that, notwithstanding the principles there discussed, it is necessary for the Court to intervene".
