= Murder of Stacey Mitchell =

2006 homicide in Australia

Stacey Mitchell (17 June 1990 – 18 December 2006) was a British-born girl living in Australia who was murdered at the age of 16, on 18 December 2006, by couple Jessica Stasinowsky and Valerie Parashumti. She was bludgeoned with a concrete block and strangled with a chain. Her corpse was found in a wheelie bin shortly afterwards. Stasinowsky and Parashumti had known Mitchell for three days, and claimed they murdered her because they found her irritating.

== Murder ==
Stacey Mitchell was born in Dorset, England, but emigrated to Australia at the age of 10. At the age of 16, she ran away from her family home and stayed with 19-year-old Parashumti and 21-year-old Stasinowsky.

Parashumti was accused by Stasinowsky of flirting with Mitchell. She planned to kill Mitchell to prove to Stasinowsky she was not attracted to her. The three of them spent the evening drinking whisky before Parashumti hit Mitchell over the back of the head with a concrete block. Stasinowsky then strangled her with a dog chain. As she lay dying, the two women kissed over her body and filmed her on a mobile phone. Earlier attempts to kill Mitchell by Stasinowsky included putting broken glass in her drink and spilling oil on the bathroom floor.

== Trial ==
The two women were tried at the Perth Supreme Court. During the trial they "smiled, giggled and whispered at each other". Parashumti's lawyer stated that she had a severe personality disorder and had grown up with an abusive father. She had also had an obsession with the vampire subculture, and a penchant for drinking people's blood since the age of 10. Parashumti's father had previously been in prison for beating his wife.

Both women pleaded guilty, and revealed that after Mitchell's death, they had visited a hardware store to look for a chainsaw and some spades. In 2008, both women were sentenced to strict security life imprisonment, with a 24-year minimum term. Stasinowsky subsequently appealed her sentence. Her appeal was unanimously rejected by the WA Court of Appeal. David Ross John Haynes, who also lived with them, was sentenced to two years' imprisonment for being an accessory. Although he had been fully aware of the plan to kill Mitchell, he agreed to go to his bedroom and listen to music.

== Imprisonment ==
It was discovered in 2009 that the two women were continuing their relationship in prison, reportedly spending up to 90 minutes together on weekdays, and seven hours a day on weekends. Parashumti was consequently moved to a separate prison. They attempted to maintain contact by sending letters, using fellow inmate Catherine Birnie as a go-between. In 2012, three prison officers were injured following their intervention in a fight involving Parashumti and another inmate. In 2013 Parashumti attempted to escape from prison, but failed to leave the grounds. It was reported she would consequently face a police charge.

== Other charges ==
In 2014, 20 charges against Stasinowsky, which pre-dated the murder, were dropped.
