= Paul Steven Haigh =

Australian serial killer (born 1957)

- Born: 5 September 1957 (age 69)
- Conviction: Murder (7 counts)
- Penalty: Life sentence without the possibility of parole

Details
- Victims: 7
- Span of crimes: 1978–1991
- Country: Australia
- State: Victoria
- Date apprehended: 1979

Paul Steven Haigh (born 5 September 1957) is an Australian convicted serial killer currently serving six sentences of life imprisonment without the possibility of parole for the murder of six people in the late 1970s. He also murdered a fellow inmate in 1991.

== The Killings ==
Shortly after getting paroled for armed robbery, 21 year old Haigh in the need for money, robbed and fatally shot shop employee Evelyn Abraham, 58. He later robbed and killed 45-year-old pizza shop owner Bruno Cingolani in 1978. Getting paranoid Haigh decided to kill people he believed knew about his crimes. He shot and killed his friend Wayne Smith 27 then later shooting Smith's ex-girlfriend Sheryle Gardner 31 as she sat in her car. Discovering Ms Gardner's son Danny Mitchell, 10, was also in the car he shot and killed him.

Haigh stabbed his girlfriend Lisa Brearley 19, to death after allowing another man to rape and sodomise her.

In 1991 he was convicted of killing sex offender Donald George Hatherley in a jail cell at Pentridge Prison.

== Appeals ==
Haigh has claimed that he has borderline personality disorder and thus deserved a lighter sentence, but this is an unsubstantiated claim. An appeal was rejected on 13 December 2012.

== See also ==
- List of serial killers by country
