= Murder of Celia Douty =

1983 murder on Brampton Island, Australia

Celia Douty
- Born: February 11, 1943; Wellesbourne, Warwickshire, England
- Died: September 1, 1983 (aged 40); Brampton Island
- Cause of death: Murder
- Other name: Tasha
- Occupation: Resort worker

Celia Natasha "Tasha" Douty (February 11, 1943 – September 1, 1983) was a British-born Australian resort worker who was murdered on Brampton Island in Queensland, Australia. The crime remained unsolved until 2001, when Sydney motor industry finance Business Manager, Wayne Butler, was found guilty. It was the first murder in Australia to be solved using DNA profiling. The prosecution relied heavily on DNA evidence and it became a case study for the use of the technique in court.

== Murder ==
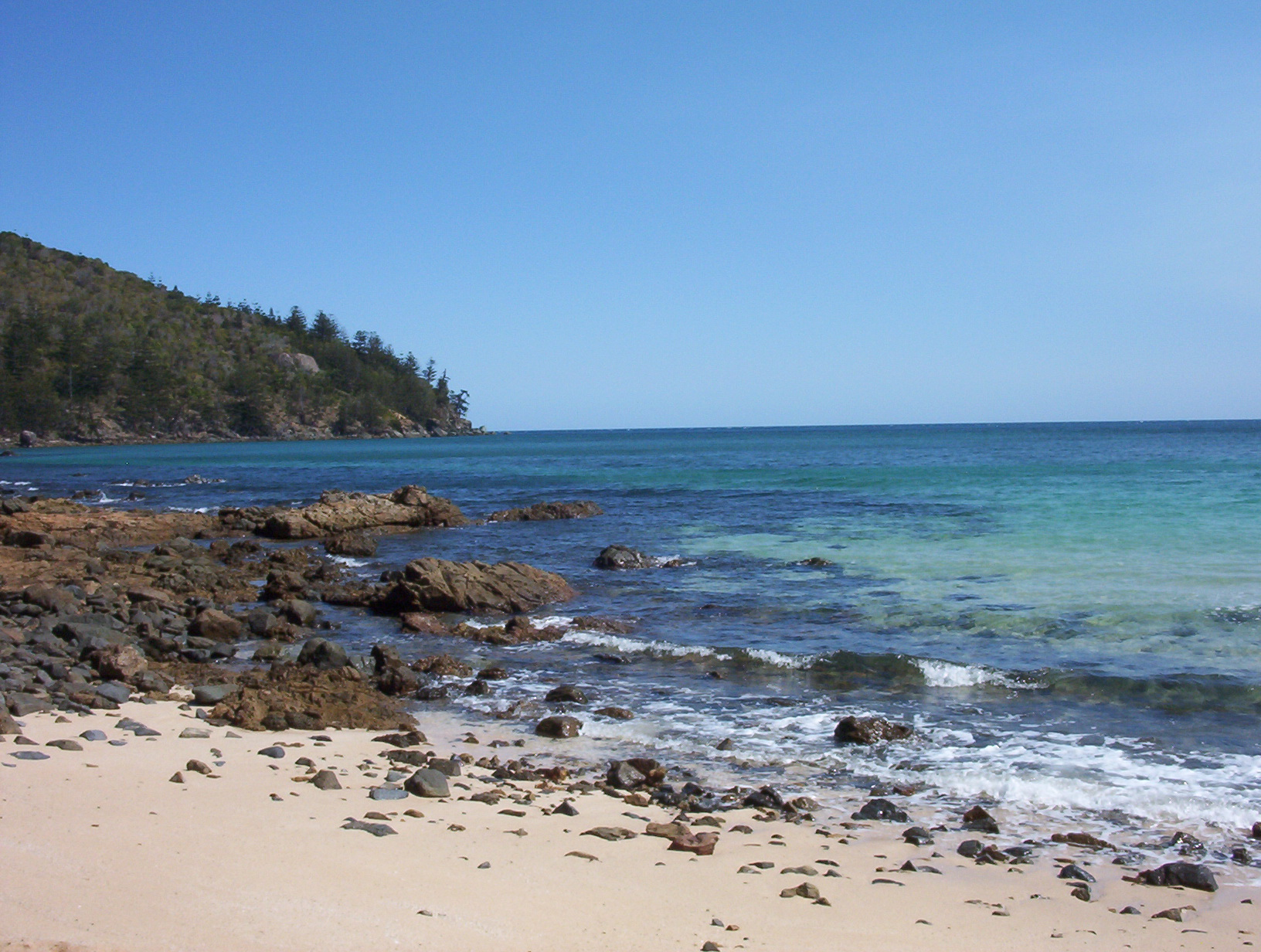
Dinghy Bay on Brampton Island, where police found Tasha Douty's body.

Tasha Douty was working as a waitress at the resort on Brampton Island in the summer of 1983. On 31 August, she took the ferry to the nearby town of Mackay for a dental appointment and spent the night there. The following day, she travelled back to the island. Police began searching for Douty when she failed to show up for work on 2 September.

It is known that Douty went straight from the ferry to her room to drop off the things she had bought which included presents for her younger son's upcoming 19th birthday. Taking the new red towel she had just purchased she headed to secluded Dinghy Bay. Butler had been following her but lost her at this time. Unfortunately, he knew her destination and asked a member of staff for directions. It is estimated that she reached the beach at about 10.40 but when the 11 o'clock plane flew in, she was no longer on the beach. She was found in scrub behind the beach, her body covered with the red towel which had blood and semen on it. Douty's clothes and personal possessions, including a handbag, were missing and were never found. She had been beaten on the head with a stone.

== Investigation ==
There were no witnesses to the crime and no confession was forthcoming. Police set about interviewing more than 300 guests and visitors on the private island. The Queensland government offered a $30,000 reward for information leading to a conviction, but no-one came forward to claim it.

Witnesses on the ferry back from Brampton Island on 1 September reported overhearing an argument between a couple in which a woman complained that she had been left alone for several hours on the island, and the man was heard to say that he did not realise the island was so large. However, the police were unable to identify the couple in question. A breakthrough then came when a man told Queensland police "I think I know that man who was having an argument with his wife on the Brampton Island ferry when that woman was murdered. He's my brother Wayne and he lives in Sydney".

Wayne Butler was originally arrested in 1988 for Douty's murder, but was released because of insufficient evidence. Butler's wife divorced him and in October 1997, went to a police station in Sydney and told officers, "My ex-husband has committed a murder. He killed a girl on a beach in Queensland. I couldn't say anything while we were married. Now we're divorced and I want you to know the truth". Although Butler had long been a suspect, it was not until DNA testing techniques were advanced enough to establish the probability that the semen stain on the towel was his, that he was charged.

== Trial ==
=== Conviction ===
Butler was tried for the murder in 2001. His former wife, Vija Samite Duffey, told the court that on the day of Douty's murder, Butler had been away for four hours. She said that this was not unusual and his behaviour was not different on his return.

The court was also told that DNA evidence had confirmed that semen stains on the red towel covering Douty's body came from Butler and that the chances of another person having the same profile were 1 in 23 × 10^{15}. Dr Kary Mullis, who won a Nobel Prize for his work on DNA replication, advised the defence throughout the trial, but was not called to testify.

The defence suggested that the DNA evidence had been contaminated in the laboratory, but the claim was rebutted by the prosecution after they demonstrated that this was not possible. Butler was not called to give evidence. He was found guilty by the jury after only 90 minutes of discussion, after which Supreme Court Judge Justice John Helman jailed Butler for life without the possibility of release on parole, saying: "For this savage crime you will spend the rest of your days in captivity. Parole will always be out of the question".

=== Appeals ===
On 31 July 2001, Wayne Butler unsuccessfully appealed his conviction. His appeal was based on the grounds that the original verdict was unsafe and unsatisfactory, and that the judge failed to uphold the submission that there was no case to answer.

Butler was given a second chance to appeal in 2005, lodging a plea for pardon with Governor of Queensland Quentin Bryce. Butler's application was based upon new evidence by forensic scientist and blood group specialist Professor Barry Boettcher, who said, "I can't say Wayne Butler is innocent. All I can say is that the laboratory results are wrong." A hearing for the second appeal was due in early 2007. The appeal was eventually heard by the Court of Appeal in 2009, and it was dismissed on 1 May 2009. Justice Patrick Keane did not regard Professor Boettcher's views as apt to cast doubt on the integrity or competence of John Tonge Centre staff - "There has never been any suggestion that the semen found on the red towel might reasonably be thought not to be that of the killer. I am satisfied there is no reasonable doubt Mr Butler's semen was on the red towel". President of the Queensland Court of Appeal Margaret McMurdo and Judge of Appeal Catherine Holmes agreed.

== See also ==
- Brampton Island
- DNA
- Genetic fingerprinting
