= Bega schoolgirl murders =

Criminal case

Lauren Barry
- Born: Lauren Margaret Barry; 11 October 1982; Bega, New South Wales, Australia
- Died: 6 October 1997 (aged 14); Fiddler’s Green Creek, Victoria, Australia
- Cause of death: Stabbing
- Known for: Murder victim

Nichole Collins
- Born: Nichole Emma Collins; 14 November 1980; Bega, New South Wales, Australia
- Died: 6 October 1997 (aged 16); Fiddler’s Green Creek, Victoria, Australia
- Cause of death: Stabbing
- Known for: Murder victim

The Bega schoolgirl murders refer to the abduction, rape, and murder of two Australian schoolgirls, 14-year-old Lauren Margaret Barry and 16-year-old Nichole Emma Collins of Bega, New South Wales, Australia on 6 October 1997. They were abducted by Leslie Camilleri and Lindsay Beckett, both from the New South Wales town of Yass. The men subjected the girls to repeated rapes and sexual assaults on five or more occasions, while driving them to remote locations throughout rural New South Wales and Victoria. Over a twelve-hour period, the girls had been driven several hundred kilometres from Bega to Fiddler's Green Creek in Victoria, where they were stabbed to death by Beckett under the order of Camilleri.

== Background ==
The girls were reported missing on the day of their disappearance, and a massive manhunt consisting of family, friends, police, and community volunteers searched the area, but failed to locate any sign of them. Police investigations lasting several weeks eventually led to Camilleri and Beckett, career criminals with over 200 criminal convictions between them. Camilleri, who claimed he was innocent of any crime and insisted Beckett acted alone, was facing existing charges relating to other sexual assaults against minors at the time of the murders.

== Perpetrators ==
=== Leslie Camilleri ===
Leslie Camilleri
- Born: Leslie Alfred Camilleri; 31 May 1969 (age 57); Liverpool, New South Wales, Australia
- Height: 6 ft 1 in (1.85 m)
- Convictions: Theft, murder × 3
- Penalty: 3 x Life imprisonment without parole

Leslie Alfred Camilleri (born 31 May 1969) was born to a family of six children in Liverpool, New South Wales. He did not meet his biological father until he was 13 years old. A psychiatric report prepared in 1993 spoke of Camilleri's deprived childhood, and "a pattern of theft and vandalism which have been his reaction to social ostracism, leading to frustration, which because of poor impulse control has ended in explosive outbursts of destructive behaviour".

Camilleri was considered "uncontrollable" as a child, and spent a large part of his childhood in juvenile detention. He escaped the institution and, between the ages of 10 and 12, lived as a street kid in King's Cross, Sydney. Camilleri was eventually taken before the children's court by police and ordered to return to the institution, where he remained until he was 15.

Four days before the abduction of Rosamari Gandarias in Canberra, and three weeks before the Bega murders, Camilleri appeared in the District Court of New South Wales on trial for charges relating to sexual offences against his de facto daughter. The trial was aborted after two days, and Camilleri was released from custody on bail. Camilleri had 146 prior convictions for offences such as dishonesty, theft, and willful damage. At the time of the murders, he lived in Yass. Camilleri had known Beckett for a period of two to three years, and would often associate with him to steal cars.

In 2012, Camilleri appeared in the Melbourne Magistrates Court via videolink from HM Prison Barwon to be charged with murdering 13-year-old schoolgirl Prudence "Prue" Bird, who disappeared from her Glenroy home in February 1992. Camilleri had made admissions in a police interview, but there was a dispute over the alleged motive and how the murder was effected. On 5 December 2013, Camilleri was sentenced to an extra 28 years' imprisonment for the murder of Bird.

=== Lindsay Beckett ===
Lindsay Beckett
- Born: Lindsay Hoani Beckett; 27 March 1974 (age 52); New Zealand
- Status: In custody
- Conviction: Murder × 2
- Penalty: Life imprisonment × 2; with a non-parole period of 35 years

Lindsay Hoani Beckett (born 27 March 1974) was born in New Zealand, and lived in the Bay of Plenty town of Ōpōtiki before moving to Australia. At the time of the murders, Beckett lived in Yass, and had come to associate with Camilleri, who was five years his senior, in criminal pursuits. It would be Beckett who would eventually break and confess to police about the Bega murders, leading them to the bodies of the victims.

It was claimed Camilleri exerted a strong influence over Beckett. In sentencing Beckett to life imprisonment, Justice Vincent described him as having "quite a low IQ," and as someone "who had fallen under the influence of an older individual of much stronger personality." In 2010, Beckett was moved to another jail after love letters from a former security guard were discovered in his cell. Beckett was 23 at the time of the murders. He will be 59 when eligible for parole in 2033.

== Events ==
=== Abduction of Barry and Collins ===
On 3 October 1997, a campsite was set up by the father of Nichole Collins at White Rock, near Bega, for his teenage daughter to invite friends over for the coming Labour Day weekend. The campsite was located three kilometres (1.9 miles) from the Collins’ home. The girls would regularly call at the house while camping to change clothing, shower, and eat. Collins's father regularly called at the campsite to check on the children, and did so on the day the girls disappeared. At about 9:00 p.m. on 5 October, Collins, wearing her high school jacket, and her younger friend, Barry, left the campsite and walked off for a nearby party.

Nearby, Camilleri and Beckett were riding in a Ford Telstar belonging to Camilleri's de facto partner. Camilleri had an argument hours earlier with his partner, and talked to Beckett about his feelings of depression. The two men were consuming beer and injecting each other with crystal meth and heroin while driving aimlessly. According to Beckett, Camilleri spotted the girls walking single file along the Bega-Tathra Road in Evan's Hill, and stopped to offer them a lift. At approximately 10:00 p.m., after a brief discussion, the girls entered the car willingly. A pink portable television, which had earlier been taken by Camilleri and Beckett from a friend in place of a drug-related debt, was removed from the back seat of the vehicle, and discarded at the side of the road to provide room for the girls to sit. The television would later become important evidence, implicating the two men in their subsequent crimes.

Beckett told police the group travelled to Tathra Beach, and spent some time there before returning to the campsite at White Rock. On the road leading to the campsite, Camilleri was agitated at the car bottoming out on the uneven gravel road, and became angry at the girls. The rear doors of the vehicle had been previously locked using the vehicle's child locks and there were no window winders, preventing the rear doors from being opened by passengers inside. Camilleri produced a knife, and told the girls they would be stabbed if they tried to escape. Beckett also produced a knife, and went along with Camilleri in threatening the girls.

"Whilst Les (Camilleri) was going off, he pulled his knife out of a pocket in the driver's door. This was a black handled pocketknife with a serrated edge. Les turned around to the girls and showed them the knife. He told them to shut up and not to say anything. Les said if they did not do what he said, he would stab them. During this, Les told me to get my knife. I got my knife out of the glove box. I have a black-handled knife with a jagged edge. I showed the girls I had a knife, too. I said to the girls to do as Les says."

Camilleri reversed away from the campsite and drove onto Old Wallagoot Road.

=== Assaults ===
Rather than being returned to the campsite as earlier promised, the girls were driven to a rubbish dump off Old Wallagoot Road, not far from their homes in Kalaru, where they were both sexually assaulted. The girls were then driven further south, passing through the town of Merimbula, until the car stopped at Beowa National Park, and the girls were further assaulted. A black rubber flashlight belonging to Barry and a tampon were later located at the scene by police.

The group continued through the town of Eden, where the men again assaulted the girls in an area south of the town. Camilleri then ordered Beckett to drive, and he drove towards Orbost before turning off and eventually stopping at Wingan Point in Victoria, at which point the girls were again assaulted. Camilleri slept, but later woke up and realised where he was. Beckett recalled in his statement to police,

"I drove down the highway and just before Cann River, Les woke up. He wanted to know where we were. I told him we were in Victoria heading to Orbost. Les cracked the shits and was abusing me. He was saying he wanted to go to Sydney. He kept saying 'the bridge'. I took this to mean he wanted to throw the girls off the bridge, because he had spoken about this before. There are some bridges on the way to Sydney on the Hume Highway which have great drops."

The girls began to question the men, asking if they were going to be murdered. Camilleri assured the girls they would only be tied up so the men could make their escape. During this time, Beckett recalled Camilleri repeating the words, "They can't go back", referring to his intention to murder the girls to avoid detection for their crimes.

=== Double murder ===
The final stop, at about 8 o'clock the following morning, was at Fiddler's Green Creek, located just south of the Victoria/New South Wales border. The girls' hands were bound, and they were then ordered along a remote bush track over rugged terrain to the creek. After the group walked alongside the creek for several hundred metres, Camilleri ordered the girls to remove their clothing and wash their bodies thoroughly to remove any evidence of the prior sexual assaults. Afterwards, the girls were then ordered to lie on their stomachs before being retied and gagged. They were then separated by a distance of approximately 30 metres (98 feet) as Camilleri and Beckett discussed what to do next. Camilleri demanded Beckett drown the girls, but Beckett protested, saying it was unfair that he had to kill both. Beckett eventually complied when an argument occurred, and Camilleri threatened to stab him if he did not comply.

==== Murder of Lauren Barry ====
Beckett attempted to first drown Barry, who was tied up near the creek. After a struggle, he became angry when his knee became wet. He reached for his knife and stabbed Barry in the neck, accidentally cutting his thumb. Beckett described the scene to police as follows:

"I went over to Lauren and dragged her down to the water. I held her head under the water. She was struggling, and she knocked me into the water. One of my knees, I think the left, went into the water. This pissed me off a little bit, and I opened my knife; it was in my left hand, and I stabbed Lauren in the left side of the neck. I said in my interview that it was the right side of the neck with my right hand, but I am been thinking since. It wasn't my right thumb which was cut, but my left. After a couple of seconds after I stabbed her, she stopped moving."

==== Murder of Nichole Collins ====
Beckett then ran up the embankment towards Collins, who was tied to a tree and out of view of Barry, who now lay dying in the creek bed. Beckett slashed Collins throat several times, then began to punch and kick her when he realised she had not died instantly from the knife wounds.

"After I stabbed Lauren, I ran up the bank to where I tied Nichole up. She must have heard what I had done to Lauren, because when I got to her, she said, ‘you're going to kill me, aren't you?’ I said, ‘shut up,’ and walked around to her left side, and I cut her throat two or three times. This was across her throat. The knife was in my left hand. Nichole was sitting down when I cut her throat.

After this, she was thrashing around on the ground. She was trying to scream, but nothing was coming out. I think I kicked her because she wouldn't keep still. And then I put my foot on to her to keep her still. This didn't work, so I stabbed her in the throat. I aimed and stabbed at the hard thing in her neck. I pushed the knife all the way in, but she still wouldn't keep still, so I worked out where her heart would be, and I stabbed her on the left side of the chest.

She still didn't stop moving, so I stabbed her in the front of the chest. I was aiming for her heart. I needed two hands to get the knife through her chest. She kept moving, so I kicked her in the head a couple of times. She still kept moving, but she was slowing down. I waited until she stopped moving, which didn't take long."

After the murders, Camilleri, who was not present during the murders and was waiting in the car, asked Beckett, "Did you see the demon?" The pair quickly left the crime scene with Beckett driving, and returned to New South Wales.

=== Disposal of evidence ===
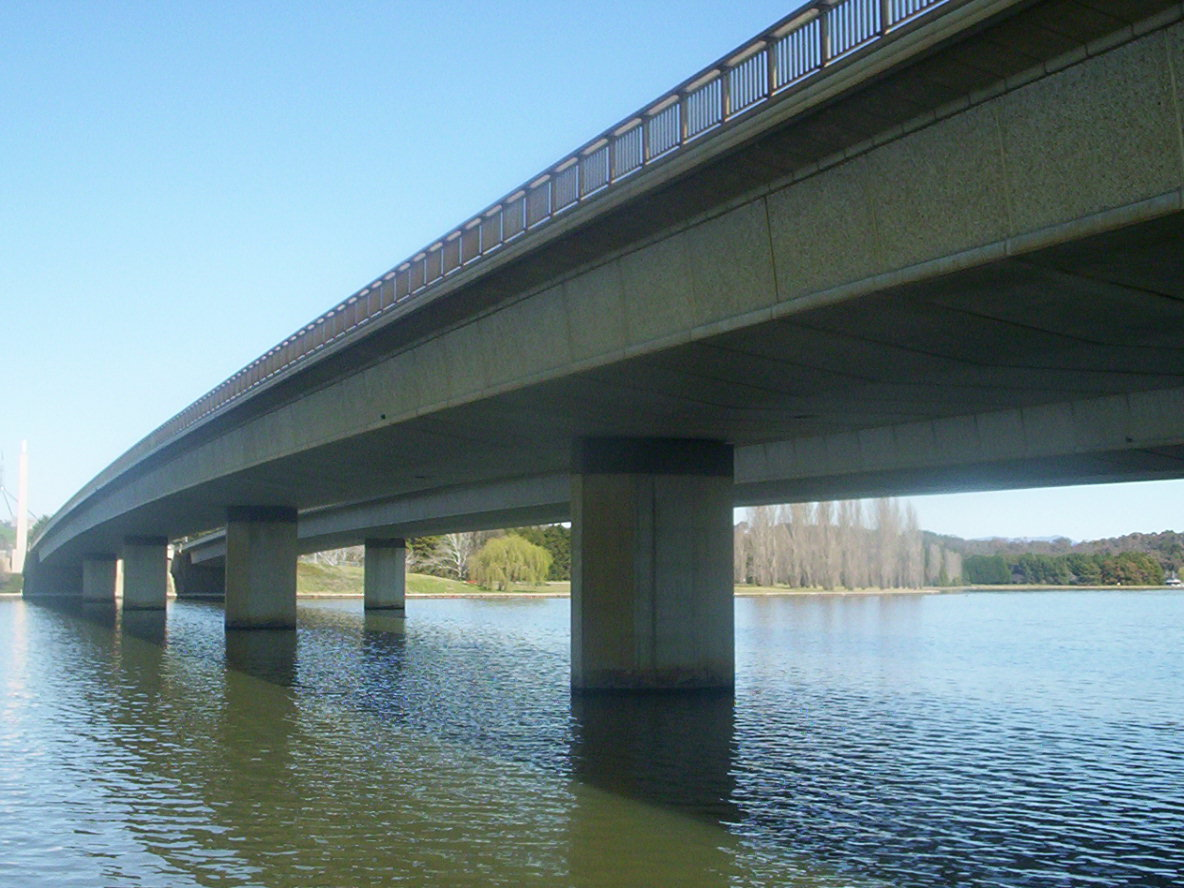
Commonwealth Avenue Bridge over Lake Burley Griffin, Canberra.

Camilleri drove from the murder scene while Beckett slept in the vehicle. Beckett woke as the pair approached Canberra. They stopped at Theodore Lookout on the Monaro Highway, and burned their blood-stained clothing, ropes, and gags used to restrain the girls. The pair later threw their knives from the Commonwealth Avenue Bridge into Lake Burley Griffin before returning to their homes in Yass.

On 8 October 1997, Camilleri and Beckett drove to Sydney, and stayed with Camilleri's brother for several days. While in Campbelltown in Sydney's south-west, they spent six hours cleaning their vehicle at a car wash, going as far as removing the vehicle's seats and carpets to clean them thoroughly. The pair then returned to Canberra to destroy further evidence, before returning to Bega on an unsuccessful search for the discarded portable television which Camilleri believed would lead police to them. The television was earlier removed by a local council worker.

== Arrests ==
On 25 October 1997, police located a car earlier stolen by Beckett in Canberra. Inside the vehicle, police discovered maps of the Bega area and items belonging to Beckett. Members of the Australian Federal Police arrested Beckett on 27 October on car theft charges and remanded him in custody. Police interviewed Camilleri the following day. Both men denied any knowledge of the girls' abduction and murder, and denied discarding a television set by the roadside. However, Camilleri admitted travelling with one that he had dropped at a St. Vincent De Paul store.

On 12 November, Beckett made a full confession to police, and agreed to guide them to the crime scene at Fiddler's Green Creek, where the girls' remains were discovered. Camilleri, who was at this time also remanded in custody for breaching bail conditions, was awaiting trial at Goulburn Correctional Centre. He was again interviewed by police and informed of Beckett's confession. Camilleri again denied any involvement in the murders, implicated Beckett as the lone killer, and insisted he was in a drug-induced stupor for most of the time the girls were in the car, stating:

"We picked up the girls and went to the beach. I shot up heroin behind the shed. While the girls were drinking, I was trying to OD. We drove around with the girls. I was asleep most of the time. Beckett later told me he had dropped both girls off at home. I remember waking up and seeing the girl. We were parked in the bush. I asked Beckett where we were, and he said Victoria on the main road somewhere. I went off my head. I told him to go home, get the fuck out of here. Then I saw him walking out of the bush. He had blood all over him. Told me he cut his finger."

Police later charged Camilleri and Beckett with multiple counts of abduction, rape, and murder.

== Trials ==
=== Leslie Camilleri ===
The trial of Camilleri began on 15 February 1999 and ran until 10 April. A total of 70 witnesses were called. Prosecution evidence included a shirt belonging to Barry containing semen matching Camilleri's DNA profile. The shirt was discovered at the rubbish dump in Old Wallagoot Road, where the pair had first taken the girls. Police recovered evidence from almost every location the pair had taken the girls and assaulted them. Beckett was called to give evidence against his co-accused, and spent five days in the witness box. Camilleri continued his claims that he was in a stupor when the girls were with them in the car, and that he barely remembered them, hoping to lay the entire blame for the murders on his associate, Beckett.

Camilleri was found guilty by the Supreme Court jury, and on 27 April 1999, was sentenced to life imprisonment for the murders, never to be released. In sentencing Camilleri to life imprisonment, never to be released, the judge remarked

Using the control which you clearly had over your weaker willed but equally evil companion [Beckett], you instructed him to perform acts that, in a somewhat perverse way, it could be said that you probably did not possess the courage to perform yourself. … It is terrible to contemplate the prospect that, as a consequence of the order which in my view justice and a proper appreciation of sentencing principles would require in your case, you may never be released from prison. However, I consider that my duty is clear. Through your own actions, you have forfeited your right ever to walk among us again.

Camilleri was 28 at the time of his crimes and 29 when sentenced. He appeared before the Supreme Court in 2001 to appeal his sentence; the appeal was unsuccessful. He later appealed to the High Court in May 2002, and again his appeal was dismissed. Camilleri has received numerous death threats from other prisoners and remains in protective custody.

In December 2012, Camilleri pleaded guilty to murdering 13-year-old Prue Bird in February 1992. Camilleri was ordered to serve an additional 28 years, receiving a reduction in sentence because of his guilty plea.

=== Lindsay Beckett ===
On 26 June 1998, Lindsay Hoani Beckett, who confessed to the murders, appeared in the Supreme Court of Victoria, where he was arraigned and pleaded guilty to the murders of Lauren Barry and Nichole Collins. On 20 August 1998, Beckett was sentenced to life imprisonment with a non-parole period of 35 years. At the time of Beckett's sentencing, his non-parole period was the longest ever given to a Victorian prisoner. After sentencing, the mother of one of the schoolgirls yelled to Beckett, "I hope you rot in hell!" as he was led from the courtroom to begin his sentence.

== Legislative change ==
As a result of this case, the Bail Act 1978 was amended in the Bail Amendment Act 1998 (NSW).

== Media ==
An episode of the documentary series Crime Investigation Australia was devoted to the case.

The murders were depicted in an episode of the documentary series Crimes That Shook Australia.

== See also ==
- List of kidnappings
- Disappearance and murder of Prue Bird
- Murder of Anita Cobby
- Murder of Janine Balding
- Murder of Ebony Simpson
- Allan Baker and Kevin Crump
- Murder of Sian Kingi
