= Murder of Peter Aston =

Australian torture murder

On 4 May 1982, Australian Army personnel Robin Reid, then aged 34, and Nicole Louise Pearce (birth name Paul Wayne Luckman), 17, kidnapped two 13-year-old boys, Peter Aston and Terry Ryan, on the Gold Coast, Queensland. Reid and Pearce then drove the boys at gun and knife point to Kingscliff, New South Wales, where they were beaten, tortured, and sexually assaulted, before Aston was ultimately murdered.

== Kidnapping and murder ==
Teenage friends Peter Aston and Terry Ryan were out exploring and wandering, and decided to try hitchhiking their way down the Gold Coast Highway. They observed two males, one clearly younger (Pearce) and one slightly older (Reid), apparently working on their parked vehicle, as the hood was open and the two appeared to be looking inside. Aston and Ryan approached the vehicle and introduced themselves, before asking where the strangers were headed, and if they could possibly hitch a ride further down the road. Reid is said to have agreed "immediately", promptly closing the hood of the car and requesting for one of the boys "sit in the front" passenger seat while the other sat with Pearce, in the back. Ryan would later recount that this request seemed very strange, to both Aston and himself, at the time; the boys simply did what they were told, thinking nothing major of it.

Not long down the road, the two boys realised Reid was not taking the agreed-upon route. When they eventually questioned his driving, Ryan immediately "had a shotgun" aimed at his head by Pearce, who told him to be quiet. At the front of the car, Reid held a knife to Aston, ordering him to do as he was told, as well. Reid continued driving with one hand, holding the knife to Aston in the other, while both boys were repeatedly beaten and roughed-up; Ryan later said he was struck with the butt of the shotgun a couple of times, causing him to nearly lose consciousness. Reid continued driving further, eventually crossing the Queensland-New South Wales border, into the beachside town of Kingscliff, where they forced the two boys out of the car and down a secluded beach track.

Reid and Pearce then reportedly placed painful toe clamps on the boys' feet to immobilise them and restrict their movements. The two men are said to have laughed and mocked at the struggling boys throughout the ordeal. Their hands were also tied behind their backs. Apparently, the men focused the majority of their energy on Aston while Ryan was forced to watch, though he was repeatedly beaten and kicked as well. Aston, however, was violently beaten, kicked, punched, sexually assaulted, struck with a shovel, had his ear lobes "pierced" a number of times with a leather punch, and had lit cigarettes pressed onto his skin before being stabbed in the head and partially scalped, according to Ryan's own testimony. The more the boys yelled for them to stop, the more angry the men would become; Reid and Pearce are said to have grown so tired of Aston's screaming that they ripped all of his clothes off and essentially "stuffed what would fit" into his mouth and throat, to silence him. However, he did not suffocate. Ryan, fearing his own torture and death was imminent, admitted to feeling as if joining the deranged men would be his only ticket to safety. Feigning a sick interest in the sadistic attack, Ryan was told by Pearce and Reid to begin beating his friend with the shovel. Regrettably, Ryan complied out of fear, though he reportedly did not deliver the killing blow.

In spite of all of his injuries sustained during the attack, Aston was still clinging to life; he was eventually covered in sand by Pearce and Reid, essentially buried alive in a shallow grave, as the medical examiner would later find sand in the boy's airways. By this point, Ryan had reasoned with the attackers enough that they eventually drove him home, dropping him a few blocks from the actual house and leaving.

== Arrest and trial ==
Reid and Pearce's committal hearing was held at Tweed Heads Court on 4 August. The case was transferred to the Sydney Supreme Court.

Reid and Pearce were convicted and sentenced to life imprisonment.

== Aftermath ==
Pearce underwent gender transition in 1990. Pearce was released in 1998.

As of June 2014 Reid has been refused parole six times.
