= Murder of Charlise Mutten =

2022 murder of an Australian girl

- Date: 11–12 January 2022
- Location: Mount Wilson, New South Wales, Australia
- Cause: Gunshot wound
- Deaths: Charlise Mutten
- Convicted: Justin Stein
- Verdict: Guilty
- Convictions: Murder, interfering with a corpse
- Sentence: Life imprisonment without the possibility of parole
- Publication bans: Initial suppression of victim name

Charlise Mutten was a nine-year-old Australian girl who disappeared from the Wildenstein Estate wedding venue at Mount Wilson in the Blue Mountains area of New South Wales, Australia on 13 January 2022, and was subsequently found murdered when her body was retrieved at a location approximately one hour's drive from where she is believed to have died.

Mutten went to the Blue Mountains for a summer holiday in December 2021 to stay with her mother, Kallista Mutten, and her mother's fiance, Justin Stein, over the Christmas period. Previously, she had lived with her grandmother in Coolangatta, Queensland since the age of five. During this period, her mother served a prison sentence for killing a passenger in a traffic collision while driving under the influence of methamphetamines. Kallista Mutten met her partner, Justin Stein, while in prison and later became engaged to him. After Justin was released from prison, he and Kallista invited Charlise to visit them at his parents' home and business venue, the Wildenstein Estate.

The child's body was discovered on 18 January, about 65 km from Mount Wilson. Stein was subsequently found guilty of her murder and sentenced to life imprisonment without the possibility of parole.

== Family background ==
Charlise Mutten had lived with her maternal grandmother at Coolangatta since she was five years old. Her parents had split up soon after she was born and she did not have ongoing contact with her father. Her mother Kallista had been jailed for three years after being convicted of dangerous driving occasioning death and driving with an illicit substance in her system. Her mother's fiancé, Justin Stein, was released on parole in November 2020 from a six-and-a-half year sentence for drug possession in 2016. His family owns the Wildenstein Estate. The couple corresponded for the last two years of Kallista's prison sentence, and were engaged soon after her release. They had been engaged for 13 months at the time of Charlise's disappearance.

== Disappearance ==
Mutten was allegedly last seen on the afternoon of 13 January; however, her disappearance was not reported to police until the next day. A wide search by emergency services over five days failed to find her. Neighbours told police they saw a car leaving the resort without headlights at about 4.30 am on 14 January.

== Body discovered and murder charge ==
On 18 January, police discovered the child's body in a barrel near the Colo River, about one hour from Mount Wilson. Stein was arrested at his home in Surry Hills and charged with murder. On 13 January he had tried unsuccessfully to launch a boat at several locations after buying five 20 kg bags of sand. His vehicle was subsequently tracked to Colo River using GPS and CCTV records. The vehicle, a red Holden Colorado ute towing a boat, was sighted at Marsden Park, Drummoyne, Windsor and near the Colo River. A large object in the tray of the ute was no longer present after the ute left the Colo River.

Police allege that Mutten was killed on either 11 or 12 January when she was left alone with Stein while her mother stayed overnight at a caravan park in Lower Portland. Police confirmed that Charlise died from a gunshot wound from a small-calibre firearm.

== Legal proceedings ==
Stein was initially held on remand at Silverwater prison.

In December 2022, police laid additional charges against Stein, alleging he "improperly interfered with a corpse". Stein was also charged with firearms offences, possessing child abuse material and break and enter.

On 19 May 2023 at Penrith Local Court, Stein pleaded not guilty to domestic violence-related murder and improperly interfering with a corpse or human remains. On 19 June 2024, he was found guilty of murder. On 26 August 2024, Stein was sentenced to life imprisonment without the possibility of parole.

== Media identification ==
The Mutten case has highlighted a New South Wales law which is harsher than in every other state. From the time that the accused is charged with a crime involving a child, the child’s name, and any information identifying them, can no longer be reported. This is despite the child's name being widely circulated during the earlier search for her. In Mutten's case, a senior family member had to give the media permission to identify her.

== See also ==
- List of solved missing person cases (2020s)
