= Lloyd Crosbie =

Lloyd Maurice Crosbie
- Born: 16 April 1982 (age 44); Wangaratta, Victoria
- Conviction: Murder
- Penalty: 2 x Life imprisonment; non-parole period 30 years

Lloyd Maurice Crosbie (born 16 April 1982 in Wangaratta, Victoria) is a convicted Australian double murderer, currently serving two consecutive sentences of life imprisonment for the murders of his girlfriend, Melissa Joy Maahs, 18, and her mother, Kaye Lucy Maahs, 54 in the Victorian town of Morwell on 18 August 2001.

Crosbie, who often spoke of "killing somebody" to be reunited with his older brothers in prison, was nineteen at the time of the murders. He was sentenced to two consecutive sentences of life imprisonment in the Supreme Court of Victoria in 2003 and will be eligible for parole in 2031, aged 49.

== Early life ==
Crosbie was born the youngest of five children in a family home that was often the scene of domestic violence. His parents separated when he was five years old and Crosbie was at times placed into foster care. He would often spend times with his older brothers killing dogs, cats and other animals and watching violent films.

Crosbie's older brother resides as an inpatient at a psychiatric hospital after being found not guilty of murder due to mental impairment. Another brother is currently serving a lengthy prison sentence for attempted murder. Crosbie spoke regularly of killing somebody to be "reunited" with his brothers.

During August 2000, police attended at Crosbie's home when neighbours alerted them of Crosbie smashing his belongings. Police arrested Crosbie and escorted him to the Latrobe Regional Hospital where he was treated by a psychiatrist after making alarming statements. A police officer who escorted Crosbie to the hospital made the following notes,

"Listening to Crosbie he was a very angry and disturbed person. He feels like the world is against him. He has a deep hatred for all those that have caused him grief in the past. I believe that he could cause serious injury to someone in the future. He appeared fixated with the idea of killing someone in an effort to be reunited with his two brothers. All members (of the police force) should be made aware of his thoughts and treat Crosbie with extreme caution."

During 2000, Crosbie met Melissa Maahs and commenced a relationship. After a short time they moved in together at Crosbie's father's premises in Morwell. From 5 November 2000 they shared a Ministry of Housing home in Buna Street, Morwell, until 8 April 2001 when the couple moved in to share with Melissa's mother Kaye in Dayble Street.

== Double murder ==
On 18 August 2001, at approximately 3am, Crosbie sat awake watching a movie. His girlfriend Melissa lay sleeping beside him in the couple's bed. Without warning, Crosbie removed a skinning knife from a scabbard and proceeded to stab his girlfriend three times to the head while she lay sleeping. Melissa woke and began to scream and fight off her attacker.

Crosbie then attacked Melissa's mother Kaye in the hallway of their home as she came to her daughter's assistance. Realizing Kaye was not dead, he attacked her further using two porcelain ornaments, smashing them both; a frying pan, buckling it; and an iron.

Crosbie alternated between attacking Melissa and Kaye many times over, and would have sexual intercourse with Melissa's dead body, using pornographic magazines on her back while defiling her. After murdering the two women, Crosbie then disturbed the contents of the house to make it appear as if a burglary had occurred.

Crosbie escaped the murder scene in a taxi, travelling to Morwell railway station and purchasing a ticket to Wangaratta. A male relative later found the bodies of the two women when he visited their home after not hearing from them for two days. Crosbie disposed of the murder weapon in a creek in Wangaratta.

== Guilty plea ==
On 20 August 2001, police attended to Crosbie's father's home in relation to the murders. Crosbie made full admissions to his crimes. He could not offer police any reasonable explanation for the murders, saying of his girlfriend Melissa's murder,

"I don't know. I don't. I just did and I've been thinking about it ever since fucking Saturday morning. Wouldn't have a clue ... It's got me thinking all this time, about what normal reason she's the only girl that's ever loved me. Why the fuck would I wanna hurt her?"

Professor Paul Mullen, Professor of Forensic Psychiatry at Monash University spoke of Crosbie's sexual sadism in a pre-sentencing report,

"Crosbie states that his relationship with Melissa Maahs was the closest and most personally rewarding relationship of his life. Similarly he describes his prior relationship with the mother, Mrs Kaye Maahs as one of affection and closeness. The dreadful killings appear to have emerged not out of anger, resentment or jealousy, but in the context of a fear of increasing closeness and a fear that he would inevitably lose these relationships which he valued. The killings themselves would appear to have elements not just of extreme brutality but of active sadism involving sexual excitement linked to the murderous acts."

Crosbie pleaded guilty to both murders and was sentenced on 11 March 2003 in the Supreme Court of Victoria to two consecutive terms of life imprisonment with a non-parole period of 30 years. Crosbie later appeared in court seeking to suppress the fact that he had sex with the body of Melissa Maahs after he murdered her. His request was denied; he resides in protective custody while imprisoned due to threats on his life from fellow prisoners.

He will be eligible for parole on 20 August 2031, aged 49.
