= R v McLean & Trinh =

Australian murder trial of Ben William McLean and Phu Ngoc Trinh

R v McLean & Trinh is the Australian murder trial of Ben William McLean and Phu Ngoc Trinh. It was tried in the Supreme Court of the Northern Territory in Darwin, Northern Territory. They were convicted of the murders of two Thai prostitutes, Phuangsri Kroksamrang and Somjai Insamram, whose bodies were found in Adelaide River near Darwin on 1 March 2004. They were convicted on 19 March 2005 and given a two consecutive sentences of life imprisonment, with a non-parole period of 25 years.

== Crime ==
On 1 March 2004, the bodies of Thai prostitutes Phuuangsri Kroksamrang and Somjai Imsamram were found in the Adelaide River near Darwin. Two suspects, Ben William McLean and Phu Ngoc Trinh, were named as suspects and charged with the murders.

== Initial plea ==
They initially pleaded not guilty to the murders.

== Claims that Hells Angels had forced them to kill the women ==
In August 2004, the two suspects changed their plea to guilty to manslaughter on the basis that they claimed that the Hells Angels motorcycle gang, which is the largest motorcycle gang in Darwin, and is reputed to be associated with organised crime in Darwin, had forced them to kill the women in return to them owing money for drug-related debts.

This claim caused great concern amongst motorcyclists worldwide, and had worldwide news coverage from New Zealand, United States, Thailand, England, Taiwan and other countries with an interest in the case.

The Crown prosecutors did not accept the plea to a reduced sentence, and attempted to prosecute them for murder.

== Admission that the claims had been a lie ==
On 7 March 2005, the accused admitted that they had lied about the Hells Angels being involved, saying that he had lied so as to protect his friend. The friend, however, continued to state that the allegations against Hells Angels were correct.

== Verdict ==
After deliberation, the two were found guilty of the murders, and sentenced to two consecutive terms of life imprisonment with a minimum non-parole period of 25 years. Justice Mildred, who tried the case, stated that there was no evidence that the Hells Angels motorcycle gang had any involvement, and noted that both suspects had changed their stories many times during the case's progress, hence their statements could not be deemed to be reliable.
