= 2007 Melbourne CBD shootings =

2007 shooting in Melbourne, Australia

Coordinates: 37.81859°S 144.959568°E

- Location: Melbourne, Victoria, Australia
- Date: 18 June 2007; 8:15 a.m. (AEST)
- Weapon: Llama Mini-Max (.40 S&W)
- Deaths: 1
- Injuries: 2
- Perpetrator: Christopher Wayne Hudson

The 2007 Melbourne CBD shooting was an incident that occurred in the Melbourne central business district, Australia on 18 June 2007. Three people were shot, one fatally, by Christopher Wayne Hudson, 31, a member of the Hells Angels Motorcycle Club, who opened fire on two men and a woman during an argument on the corner of William Street and Flinders Lane at about 8:20 a.m. Hudson fled from the scene and went into hiding for two days, before turning himself in to police on 20 June 2007 in Wallan, north of Melbourne.

In May 2008, Hudson pleaded guilty to the murder of Brendan Keilar and was sentenced that September to life imprisonment with a minimum of 35 years before becoming eligible for parole.

== Christopher Hudson ==
Christopher Wayne Hudson
- Parent: Terry Hudson
- Convictions: Murder; Attempted murder × 2 Intentionally causing serious injury
- Penalty: Life imprisonment 35-year non-parole period

Christopher Hudson was a full member of the Hells Angels Motorcycle Club, having defected from rival group The Finks in 2006. Shortly afterward, he was involved in a kickboxing tournament on the Gold Coast and was shot in the chin. In the days before the killing of Brendan Keilar, Hudson had fired at police in Campbellfield after a night of car driving with Collingwood footballer Alan Didak. On 28 June, Didak was interviewed by police about this incident. Didak claimed that he was intoxicated at the time, was not in control of the situation and was concerned for his safety.

== The shootings ==
Hudson spent the night of 17 June 2007 drinking at the Spearmint Rhino in King Street. Early in the morning of 18 June, he brutally bashed Autumn Daly-Holt, a workmate of his girlfriend, 24-year-old Kara Douglas. He then called Douglas, who arrived to pick him up around 7:30 a.m. Hudson dragged her out onto the street by her hair. At the corner of William Street and Flinders Lane, two male bystanders, 43-year-old solicitor Brendan Keilar and 25-year-old Dutch backpacker Paul de Waard attempted to assist Douglas. Hudson pulled a gun and shot all three. Keilar was fatally wounded in the head. De Waard and Douglas were shot in the upper body. Douglas later had a kidney removed as a result of her injuries. Douglas, from Sydney, had been staying in the Punt Hill apartments on Flinders Lane. Hudson fled the scene as Keilar died in the street, dumping his weapon and jacket in a nearby construction site on Flinders Street between Queen and Bond Streets, where they were found by a construction worker about an hour later. The Rialto Towers were evacuated amid reports that the gunman had fled into the tower, sparking a level-to-level search.

His car was discovered abandoned on Flinders Lane between Swanston and Elizabeth Streets. The black Honda CRV with New South Wales registration plates was revealed to be one vehicle owned by the gunman. His other vehicle was a black Mercedes-Benz sedan, later found in Richmond.

Still high from a drug binge, Hudson fled to a Hells Angels safehouse north of the city. At 5:00 p.m. on 20 June, he surrendered himself to Victorian Police at Wallan, walking into the police station without incident. Homicide squad detectives transferred him to Melbourne where he was charged with murder and other offences in an out-of-court hearing.

== Aftermath and trial ==
Hudson was to appear in the Melbourne Magistrates' Court, but was unable to make it due to an injury to his forearm that required surgery. The magistrate ordered that Hudson be remanded into custody. The formal charges were: one charge of murder in relation to Brendan Keilar, two charges of attempted murder in relation to Kara Douglas and Paul de Waard, one charge of intentionally causing serious injury in relation to Autumn Daly-Holt and one charge of unlawful imprisonment. He was later also charged with nine offences in relation to the shooting incident involving Collingwood Magpies player Alan Didak.

In May 2009, allegations came to light that Hudson had been tortured by members of the Hells Angels for bringing unwanted police attention to the group. The claimant alleges a club tattoo was burned from his forearm with a blowtorch before he surrendered to police. The story arose after police raided the Angels' clubhouse in Sydney and took possession of a Harley-Davidson motorcycle apparently owned by Hudson. This story was denied by Victoria Police and was further discredited when Hudson's stepmother sent a recent photograph, clearly showing the club tattoo, to the ABC program Media Watch.

Paul de Waard returned to the Netherlands to recover from his injuries. In October 2007, he revealed on a television interview that he was still undergoing extensive rehabilitation. He also made an appearance on the Dutch television show In de schaduw van het nieuws (In the shadow of the news) on 21 November 2009.
