= Lindsey Robert Rose =

Australian serial killer

- Born: Lindsey Robert Lehman; 2 May 1955 (age 71); Sydney, Australia
- Other name: Lindsey Lehman
- Occupations: Fitter and turner, paramedic, private investigator, criminal
- Children: 1
- Criminal charge: Murder x 5
- Penalty: 5 x life imprisonment without parole

Details
- Span of crimes: 1984–1994
- Date apprehended: 10 April 1997

Lindsey Robert Rose (né Lehman; born 2 May 1955) is an Australian serial killer from New South Wales, currently serving five sentences of life imprisonment without the possibility of parole for the murder of five people between 1984 and 1994.

== Early life ==
Lindsey Robert Rose was born Lindsey Robert Lehman on 2 May 1955 at North Sydney, New South Wales, Australia. He was raised by his mother, who had separated from Rose's father before Rose was born. He became Lindsey Rose after his mother remarried.

Rose grew up in Sydney's Western Suburbs and completed an apprenticeship as a fitter and turner before joining the New South Wales Ambulance Service in 1976. He was notably one of the first responders at the Granville Train Disaster in 1977. Rose left the ambulance service and became a licensed private investigator in 1979. His criminal career commenced soon thereafter.

== Criminal career ==
=== Cavanagh/Lee murders ===
On 20 January 1984 Rose shot and killed Edward John "Bill" Cavanagh and Cavanagh's girlfriend, Carmelita Lee, at their home in Sydney's Hoxton Park. Rose later told investigators that he'd murdered Cavanagh as revenge for the alleged beating of one of Rose's friends a few years earlier. He murdered Lee so as to not leave a witness.

Cavanagh ran a trucking business and it was alleged that he was involved with the Calabrian mafia, including the notorious drug lord, Robert Trimbole.

=== Holford murder ===
On 19 January 1987 Rose broke into the West Ryde home of wealthy businessman, William "Bill" Graf, intending to commit a burglary. He was surprised on the premises by Graf's de facto, Reynette Holford. Rose stabbed Holford multiple times with a screwdriver and a vegetable knife. He then tied her up, made his escape and Holford died from her injuries.

=== Pang/Ozonal murders ===
On 14 February 1994 Rose shot and killed Fatma Ozonal and then shot and stabbed Kerrie Pang to death at Pang's massage parlour, "Kerrie's Oasis" in Gladesville. Ronald Waters was offered payment of $500 to assist Rose by knocking on the door and gaining access to the premises, as Pang would have recognised Rose, he did not know how things were going to turn out. Ronald Waters never received this payment.

The murder of Pang had been arranged by her de facto partner Mark Lewis. Lewis was later found guilty of both murders and sentenced to life imprisonment (without the possibility of parole) for the murder of Pang plus 18 years for the murder of Ozonal. Waters pleaded guilty to being an accessory after the fact to the murders and was sentenced to 18 months periodic detention.

Evidence at Lewis's trial indicated that the motive for Pang's murder was difficulties in Lewis and Pang's relationship and Lewis's dissatisfaction with Pang's line of work as well as Rose's reported hatred of Pang. Ozonal was not part of the murder plan and was simply in the wrong place at the wrong time.

=== Escape and capture ===
Rose was not a suspect for any of the five murders until 1996 when a corrupt police officer, an associate of Rose, told NSW police detectives that Rose had boasted of committing at least two murders.

After being questioned, Rose evaded police surveillance on 4 July 1996 and drove from Sydney to Adelaide, South Australia. In Adelaide he obtained employment using his birth name, Lindsey Lehman, but was not located until 40 weeks later when a member of the public identified Rose after his mugshot was broadcast on television news programs on 9 April 1997. Rose was arrested the next morning, arriving for work, by members of the South Australian Police STAR Force.

=== Guilty plea and sentencing ===
On 18 June 1998 Rose pleaded guilty to the five murders in the Supreme Court of New South Wales. He was represented by the well-known barrister, Stuart Littlemore KC.

On 3 September 1998 Rose was sentenced to five consecutive terms of life imprisonment without the possibility of parole.

=== Other crimes ===
In December 1998, Rose was sentenced for other crimes to which he had confessed: conspiracy to pervert the course of justice, robbery, kidnapping, robbery whilst armed, malicious wounding, larceny and supplying a prohibited drug. These additional prison terms summed to 39 years.

Notably, on New Year's Day in 1983, Rose and criminal associates hijacked a semi-trailer containing cigarettes valued at $600,000, and held two truck drivers hostage for several hours.

== Prison life ==
Rose was one of the first six inmates of Goulburn Correctional Centre's High Risk Management Unit upon its creation in 2001.

On 19 November 2005 The Daily Telegraph reported that Rose was unhappy with the fact that a number of inmates had converted to Islam and in September 2007 reported that Rose had written a letter to prison management indicating he would help to stop inmates converting to Islam.

On 7 October 2007 The Daily Telegraph reported that Rose was one of several inmates who had smuggled out "letters of complaint" against a range of conditions at the prison. It said that education was "virtually non existent in the HRMU [High Risk Management Unit]...Many inmates do not complete courses as they are thwarted by perfunctory teachers or ridiculous decisions ...Example: An inmate in another part of the prison is caught with contraband on a computer, the department of corrective services ban all computers, effectively putting inmates back to the Stone Age."

== Media ==
- In August 2017, Hachette Australia published The Fatalist, author Campbell McConachie's criminal biography of Rose. McConachie had met Rose (unaware he was a criminal) at his local pub when McConachie was 19, and later spent many hours at the Goulburn Super Max prison gaining first hand insight into his subject.
- In October 2017, Rose's daughter was featured in the Australian Story profile "Atoning for his sins: My father the multiple murderer".
- The double murder was featured on Series 3 of the television series Forensic Investigators (2006).
