= Murder of Sian Kingi =

1987 abduction and murder in Noosa, Australia

Sian Kingi
- Sian Kingi in 1986
- Born: 16 December 1974; New Zealand
- Died: 27 November 1987 (aged 12); Tinbeerwah, Queensland, Australia
- Cause of death: Murder by stabbing
- Occupation: Student
- Known for: Murder victim of Barrie Watts and Valmae Beck

Sian Kingi (16 December 1974 – 27 November 1987) was a twelve-year-old New Zealand-Australian girl of Maori descent who was abducted, raped and murdered in Noosa, Queensland in November 1987. Barrie John Watts and Valmae Faye Beck, a married couple, were convicted in 1988 of the much-publicised crime. Watts was sentenced to life imprisonment without parole. Beck would have been eligible for parole after 14.5 years, but died while she was still incarcerated.

== Disappearance ==
At around 4:30 p.m. on Friday, 27 November 1987, Sian Kingi, a twelve-year-old schoolgirl, was last seen riding her yellow 10-speed bicycle home after school near Pinnaroo Park in Noosa Heads. Just beforehand, Kingi had been shopping with her mother, and took her regular route home afterwards through the park. When her mother arrived home and Kingi was not there as expected, it was assumed that she had met friends from her school or her volleyball team was delayed. Later, when Kingi still did not return, her mother began calling the homes of her friends without success. By 8 p.m., Kingi's parents began retracing her steps, and after retrieving her abandoned bicycle from the park, visited the local police to report the disappearance.

== Investigation ==
Despite the late notice, police were able to assist in having a missing person's report for Kingi inserted into the following day's newspaper. Police also began collecting information about people who had been in the park at the time of the disappearance. Police had little to go on until the discovery of Kingi's body on 3 December 1987, 15 kilometres away in a dry creek bed in the Tinbeerwah Mountain State Forest (now called Tewantin National Park).

Attention then turned to a dusty unidentified white 1973 Holden Kingswood station wagon with interstate registration that had been seen in the general area. In the weeks that followed, as police gathered evidence, numerous other incidents were linked to the vehicle (although exact details of the vehicle often varied), including the suspicious behaviour of the driver and three other assault incidents. The owner of the vehicle, confirmed as Victorian registration LLE-429, was finally identified as Valmae Beck. Beck and her husband Barrie Watts, who had married a year earlier, had been living in Perth, but had moved to Victoria before renting a property in Lowood, Queensland. Both had extensive criminal records and were out on bail.

When police visited the Lowood property on 11 December, evidence indicated that Watts and Beck had last been there on 4 December (when news of the discovery of the body broke). Cut hair and dye kits indicated that both had changed their appearance. An important lead to locate Watts and Beck was that the owner of the property had received a money order for rent from the couple on 10 December from The Entrance, New South Wales. Plain-clothes police were then able to locate and arrest the couple there on 12 December, and they were extradited to Queensland on 14 December.

The couple were charged on 15 December with the abduction, rape and murder of Kingi. During questioning, Watts refused to speak, but Beck was more talkative. Between Beck's comments and secret recordings from their adjacent holding cells, investigators were able to recreate the crime. Beck explained how Watts, unsatisfied with her because she was ten years his senior, had fantasised about raping a young virgin. After a number of previous attempts on other victims in Ipswich, they noticed Kingi, and Beck stopped her on the premise that she was looking for her lost poodle. After Kingi dismounted to help, Watts grabbed her from behind and forced her into the back of their car, where she was bound and then driven by Beck to Tinbeerwah. Kingi was then raped by Watts before being stabbed, strangled and abandoned.

== Trial ==
At a committal hearing in April 1988, Beck pleaded guilty to the abduction and rape, and not guilty to the murder, while Watts pleaded not guilty to all charges. The couple were tried separately at the Noosa Magistrates Court primarily on Beck's testimony. Beck's trial commenced in October 1988 and Watts's in February 1990. Beck was found guilty on 20 October 1988, and given three years, five years, and life imprisonment for the three charges. Watts, who remained unresponsive during trial, was found guilty on 28 February 1990, and given three years, fifteen years, and life imprisonment for the three charges.

== Subsequent developments ==
=== Watts ===
Barrie Watts
- Born: John Fulton Beck; 15 July 1953 (age 73)
- Spouse: Valmae Beck (1986–1990; divorced)
- Status: Incarcerated
- Convictions: Rape; Murder
- Penalty: 2 life sentences without possibility of parole

During trial, it was revealed that Barrie Watts was an orphan with a long criminal record who had met Beck in 1983 and married her in 1986 in Perth. In 1995, he was tried for the murder of Helen Mary Feeney, who was last seen alive on 29 October 1987, one month before the murder of Kingi. The case failed due to lack of evidence. In 2007, in an unsuccessful effort to promote his parole chances, Watts finally confessed to his involvement in the murder of Kingi.

=== Beck ===
Valmae Beck
- Born: Valmae Faye Beck; 2 August 1943
- Died: 27 May 2008 (aged 64); Townsville, Queensland, Australia
- Other name: Fay Cramb
- Spouse: Barrie Watts (1986–1990; divorced)
- Children: 6
- Convictions: Rape, murder
- Penalty: Life imprisonment with a non-parole period of 14½ years

Valmae Beck had three older brothers, and as a twelve-year-old, began working in a clothing factory. By fifteen, due to parental neglect, she became a ward of the state and spent much of the period from 1961 to 1972 in and out of jail. Prior to her relationship with Watts, Beck had six children from two previous marriages.

In prison, Beck was targeted by fellow inmates and was assaulted frequently. At one point, she was struck in the head with a tin can in a sock, causing serious injury. While in prison in Perth, she met and was influenced by serial killer Catherine Birnie. Beck eventually had to be transferred to the Townsville Correctional Centre. She was also said to have converted to Christianity during this time. Beck divorced Watts in 1990, saying she regretted everything she had ever done with him. In 1993, she began a romance with Robert John Fardon, a convicted rapist.

Beck unsuccessfully applied for parole three times, and in 2007 it was reported that she had legally changed her name to Fay Cramb. In May 2008, she was placed in an induced coma in Townsville Hospital following heart surgery. Police hoped to obtain a deathbed confession regarding three other unsolved Brisbane-area murders of young women, but Beck died on 27 May 2008 without regaining consciousness.

== Media ==
An episode of the documentary series Crime Investigation Australia was devoted to the case.

An episode of the true crime podcast Casefile True Crime covered the case in episode Case 101: Sian Kingi.

== See also ==
- Bega schoolgirl murders
- David and Catherine Birnie
- List of kidnappings
- Lists of solved missing person cases
- Murder of Daniel Morcombe
- Murder of Ebony Simpson
- Wanda Beach Murders
