= Wynarka, South Australia =

Wynarka
- Town
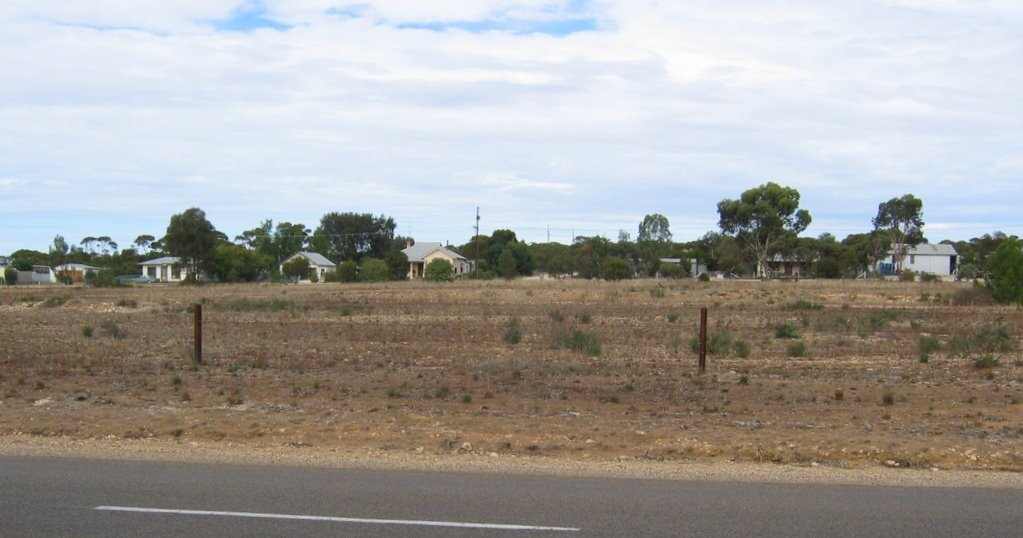
- Highway view of Wynarka

- Coordinates: 35°08′03″S 139°43′45″E
- Country: Australia
- State: South Australia
- Region: Murray and Mallee
- LGA: District Council of Karoonda East Murray
- Location: 105 km (65 mi) E of Adelaide
- Established: 9 January 1913 (town); 11 November 1999 (locality)

Government
  - State electorate: Hammond
  - Federal division: Barker
- Elevation: 63 m (207 ft)

Population
  - Total: 76 (2016 census)
- Time zone: UTC+9:30 (ACST)
  - Summer (DST): UTC+10:30 (ACDT)
- Postcode: 5306
- County: Buccleuch
- Mean max temp: 23.6 °C (74.5 °F)
- Mean min temp: 9.3 °C (48.7 °F)
- Annual rainfall: 343.0 mm (13.50 in)
Localities around Wynarka
Ettrick	Bowhill	Karoonda
Ettrick; Chapman Bore; Naturi	Wynarka	Karoonda
Naturi	Moorlands	Sherlock
- Location; Adjoining localities

Wynarka is a very small town in South Australia 120 kilometres (75 mi) southeast of Adelaide on the Karoonda Highway (B55) and Loxton railway line in the Murray Mallee. Wynarka lies within the District Council of Karoonda East Murray.

== Founding ==
The government town of Wynarka was proclaimed on 9 January 1913 on land in the cadastral unit of the Hundred of Hooper located to the immediate south of the Wynarka Railway Station on the Loxton railway line.

== Boundaries ==
The locality's boundaries were created on 11 November 1999 and includes the site of the government town of Wynarka which is located in its approximate centre. The current boundaries of Wynarka include the former locality of Kulde, the next railway station towards Tailem Bend, named after the local Aboriginal word for "brothers".

== Etymology ==
The name Wynarka is from an Aboriginal word meaning a strayer.

== 2015 deaths ==
On 15 July 2015, the remains of a young child in a suitcase were discovered near the side of the Karoonda Highway near Wynarka. The child was not identified until October as having been Khandalyce Kiara Pearce who had been reported missing with her mother from extended family in Alice Springs in 2009. Her mother's body had been found but not identified in 2010 in the Belanglo State Forest in New South Wales and is also believed to have been murdered.

== Population ==
The 2016 Australian census which was conducted in August 2016 reports that Wynarka had a population of 76 people.
