= Murders of Karlie Pearce-Stevenson and Khandalyce Pearce =

21st-century murder case in Australia

Locations associated with the case

The murders of Karlie Pearce-Stevenson and Khandalyce Pearce were initially treated as unrelated. The skeletal remains of Pearce-Stevenson were found in Belanglo State Forest, New South Wales, Australia in 2010. Her daughter Khandalyce Pearce's remains were found near Wynarka, South Australia (1,100 kilometres (680 mi) from Belanglo) in July 2015. The two cases were not linked until positive identification was confirmed by DNA testing in October 2015. The mother and daughter were last seen by family in 2008 in Alice Springs, Northern Territory and reported missing in 2009; however, the report was withdrawn. It was discovered Pearce-Stevenson's mobile phone was used for years following her death to send false "proof of life" messages to family and friends. The mother and child's identities were exploited by third parties to commit social security and other types of identity fraud.

On 28 October 2015, Daniel James Holdom, reported to be Pearce-Stevenson's former partner, was arrested in Cessnock, New South Wales, and charged with her murder. On 15 December, he was also charged with the murder of her daughter. On 30 November 2018, he was sentenced to two life sentences for the murders.

== Belanglo State Forest ==
On 29 August 2010, trail bike riders discovered skeletal human remains in the Belanglo State Forest in New South Wales. Media reports at first linked the killing to serial killer Ivan Milat and the backpacker murders, but later forensic examination found the remains had been left there many years after Milat was sent to jail in 1996 for the seven murders in the forest. In a 2010 appeal for information, police called the woman "Angel" after the motif on a T-shirt she was wearing.

On 21 October 2015, the bones were identified as the body of Pearce-Stevenson, aged 20, from Alice Springs.

== Wynarka ==
On 15 July 2015, the remains of a young child surrounded by girl's clothing were discovered by a passing motorist who examined an abandoned suitcase at the side of the Karoonda Highway near Wynarka in the Murray Mallee region of South Australia. From the beginning, investigators believed the child had suffered a violent death several years before the remains had been dumped in the suitcase. It was not until October 2015 that the victim was identified as Pearce, aged two, who, with her mother, had been reported missing from Alice Springs more than five years earlier, in 2009.

== Linking the events ==
Soon after the discovery of the child's remains, police made a public appeal for information that could help identify her, based on items that were found with the suitcase including children's clothing and a distinctive hand-made quilt. After more than 1,200 calls to Crime Stoppers, one caller was able to identify the quilt as one made by the child's grandmother, who had died in 2012 believing her daughter and granddaughter were living interstate. Positive identification was achieved by comparing DNA extracted from the child's skeletal remains with DNA retained from a neonatal heel prick test. A national DNA search then linked the child's remains with the profile of her mother, the previously unidentified remains found in the Belanglo State Forest.

The last confirmed sightings of the mother and daughter before their deaths were on 8 November 2008, when they were stopped by police on the Stuart Highway near Coober Pedy in the far north of South Australia, and in Charnwood, a suburb of Canberra, in December 2008.

NSW and SA police conducted a joint investigation, including collaboration with ACT and NT police.

== Victims ==
Karlie Pearce-Stevenson
- Born: Karlie Jade Pearce; 7 August 1988; Alice Springs, Northern Territory, Australia
- Died: c. 14 December 2008 (aged 20); Belanglo State Forest, New South Wales, Australia
- Cause of death: Broken neck
- Body discovered: 29 August 2010
- Known for: homicide
- Children: Khandalyce Kiara Pearce (2006–c. 2008)

Khandalyce Pearce
- Born: Khandalyce Kiara Pearce; 19 June 2006; Alice Springs, Northern Territory, Australia
- Died: c. 19 December 2008 (aged 2); Narrandera, New South Wales, Australia
- Cause of death: Suffocation
- Body discovered: 15 July 2015
- Known for: Body in the suitcase found around Wynarka, South Australia

Karlie Jade Pearce-Stevenson was born in 1988 in Alice Springs and attended Braitling Primary School and Alice Springs High School. She was a keen netballer. Her mother died in 2012. Pearce-Stevenson's step-father and step-brother still live in Alice Springs.

Khandalyce Kiara Pearce was Pearce-Stevenson's daughter. She was born in 2006 in Alice Springs.

Pearce-Stevenson is believed to have left Alice Springs with Pearce in 2008 to look for work. Police believe they travelled to Darwin, Adelaide, the Murray and Riverland districts, Victoria and Canberra, and appealed to owners of motels, hotels and caravan parks to check their records in case the pair had stayed at their premises. A missing person report was raised with the Northern Territory Police by Pearce-Stevenson's mother on 4 September 2009. The report was closed on 9 October 2009 after "she was reassured Pearce-Stevenson was safe and well, but did not want family contact at that time." Police also believe Pearce-Stevenson was killed in Belanglo Forest on 14 or 15 December 2008, and her daughter was killed sometime later in a different location.

Originally, investigators did not reveal details of injuries, or how the pair were killed, stating only that the child died a "violent death under terrible circumstances". However, on September 28, 2018, the NSW Supreme Court lifted suppression orders on the evidence in the murders. Those documents revealed the cruelty of their deaths. Karlie's autopsy shows Holdom had forcefully kneed or stomped on her chest, causing her death, and had delighted in his callous acts, taking numerous pictures of Karlie after she died. Khandalyce was found with a disposable nappy wrapped around her head, tape wrapped around her eyes and chin, and dishcloths stuffed down her throat. Both Karlie and Khandalyce had been sexually assaulted.

The remains of the two victims were returned to Alice Springs and a funeral service and burial was held in December 2015 with the assistance of funds raised from the public and local government.

== Identity theft ==
Pearce-Stevenson's mobile phone was used until mid-2011, communicating via text messages to give her family and friends the impression she was alive and well, and to appeal for money. Her bank account was accessed until at least 2012 at locations in four states and territories. Over $90,000 was stolen through the account, including Centrelink family payments and other proceeds of fraud. A woman in a wheelchair, accompanied by a man, impersonated Pearce-Stevenson to staff at a credit union in June 2010 using her identity documents. Another woman impersonated her at a Centrelink office in South Australia the same year, using identity documents for Pearce-Stevenson and her daughter. The woman had her leg amputated as a result of a car rollover in 2008 in which Holdom was driving on the Stuart Highway north of Marla. Two of her children were killed in the crash. She reached an out-of-court settlement in May 2016.

== Suspects ==
Within days of releasing the identities of the victims, police reported they had several suspects, including one in a NSW jail awaiting sentencing on unrelated charges.

== Arrest ==
On 28 October 2015, 41-year-old Daniel James Holdom was arrested in Cessnock, New South Wales. He was later charged with the murder of Pearce-Stevenson. He was found to be in a relationship with a woman named Hazel Passmore, who allegedly stole Pearce-Stevenson's identity after she was killed and investigators believe the suspect was also involved in a relationship with Pearce-Stevenson. Police allegedly traced a signal from the man's mobile telephone to the location her remains were found in Belanglo Forest at about the time of her death in December.

In September 2008, the suspect had been involved in a car accident in which two of his then partner's children were killed. The mother of the children sustained injuries that left her a wheelchair user and she is believed to be the same woman who impersonated Pearce-Stevenson at a credit union in 2010. Earlier, in August 2008, the woman had uploaded images of Pearce to her Facebook. The child was photographed in the company of her own children at a motor-show in Alice Springs.

On 15 December 2015, Holdom was arrested again in Cessnock for the murder of Pearce. Described as a very violent death, investigators allege Pearce was murdered only a few days after her mother. An officer involved in the investigation remarked it was fortunate the suspect was already in custody as it had allowed police to take time to conduct a "thorough and comprehensive investigation". Holdom was charged at Parramatta Local Court and refused bail. His case was adjourned until 28 January 2016, when his trial was intended to take place at the Central Law Courts of Sydney. The case was further adjourned to March as the police and prosecutors were still collating the brief of evidence, and only about one third of it had been provided to the defence lawyers. It was adjourned again in September 2016 to at least November due to evidence being collected in a total of five jurisdictions.

== Committal hearing ==
During his committal hearing in August 2017, it was alleged that Holdom had told a witness he stepped on Pearce-Stevenson's throat, crushed her windpipe and buried her body in the Belanglo forest. It was also alleged he stopped at a supermarket and bought duct tape and garbage bags before he suffocated Pearce in a motel in Narrandera, stuffed her body in a suitcase, and dumped it in Wynarka where it remained for nearly seven years. His first appearance in the Supreme Court of New South Wales was on 1 December 2017. His trial was expected to take three months from 6 August 2018, however on 31 July 2018, Holdom pleaded guilty to the murders. His sentencing, originally set for 29 September, was moved to 9 November, where he faced two life sentences.

The brutality of the murders was publicly revealed following his guilty plea. Holdom also had a prior history of violence against women and an interest in sexual violence toward children. A police fact sheet tendered to the court cited evidence of a sexual motive to the murder of the child.

Bruce Pearce, Pearce-Stevenson's father and Pearce's grandfather, gave a written statement during the sentencing, expressing his desire for a death sentence against Holdom. New South Wales abolished the death penalty for murder in 1955. Prosecutor Mark Tedeschi described the murders as a "thrill killing", and said "Both murders fall within the worst case and can aptly be described as atrocious, detestable, hateful, gravely reprehensible and extremely wicked".

== Sentence ==
On 30 November 2018, Holdom was sentenced in the Supreme Court of New South Wales for two charges of murder. When sentencing, Justice Robert Hulme ordered: "I am satisfied beyond reasonable doubt that [Holdom's] culpability is so extreme, and that his crimes are of a level of heinousness, that no objective or subjective factors mitigates the need to impose the ultimate sentence... For the murder of Karlie Jade Pearce-Stevenson the offender is sentenced to imprisonment for life. For the murder of Khandalyce Kiara Pearce the offender is sentenced to imprisonment for life." Justice Hulme did not set a non-parole period, therefore Holdom is to remain incarcerated for the remainder of his natural life.

== See also ==
- Backpacker murders, a series of murders committed by Ivan Milat in Belanglo State Forest
- List of solved missing person cases (post-2000)
- Snowtown murders, a series of homicides in South Australia where the killers used identity fraud
