= Maitland Gaol =

Former prison in East Maitland, New South Wales, Australia

Old Maitland Gaol
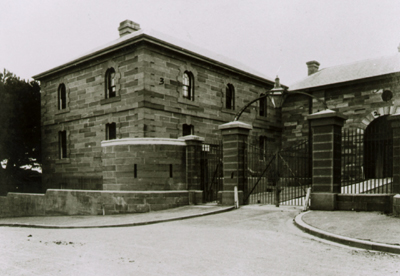
- The former Maitland Gaol and Governor's House

- Location in New South Wales
- Location: John Street, East Maitland, New South Wales, Australia; 32°44′42″S 151°35′23″E
- Status: Temporarily Closed(Museum)
- Security class: Maximum security
- Capacity: 174, but has reached 400+
- Opened: 1848
- Closed: 31 January 1998 after 147–148 years)
- Former name: Maitland Gaol, Maitland Correctional Centre
- Building details
- Former names: Maitland Correctional Centre

General information
- Construction started: 1826
- Completed: 1875

Technical details
- Material: Stone

Design and construction
- Architects: Mortimer Lewis (1844–48); James Barnet (1851–75)
- Architecture firm: Colonial Architect of New South Wales
- Main contractor: H. Brodie and A. Craig
- Known for: Ivan Milat

New South Wales Heritage Register
- Official name: Maitland Correctional Centre
- Type: Built
- Criteria: a., c., e.
- Designated: 2 April 1999
- Reference no.: 01296

The Old Maitland Gaol, also known as Maitland Correctional Centre, is a heritage-listed former Australian prison located in East Maitland, New South Wales. Its construction was started in 1844 and prisoners first entered the gaol in 1848. By the time of its closure, on 31 January 1998, it had become the longest continuously-run gaol in Australia. It has since been turned into a museum and was a popular tourist attraction. It is currently closed to the public indefinitely due to safety issues.

It was added to the New South Wales State Heritage Register on 2 April 1999.

== History ==
The gaol is in East Maitland, and this location was first used as a gaol in 1843; in the same year two prisoners were hanged there for the murder of a child. Permanent buildings were not begun until 1846 (though a foundation stone was laid in 1844), and the official opening was in December 1848. The first stage included the south-east wing, the gate lodges and the enclosing wall of the original compound, all of stone. The second stage, built 1861–73 under James Barnet, included the north-west wing, the watch towers, the warders' quarters and the governor's residence that flanked the entrance from John Street, the two-storey building that contained a chapel and a school room on the first floor and workshops on the ground floor.

Flogging was in place whilst the gaol was being built. Executions were open to the public until 1861, and crowds were common. Hangings took place at the main gates and the back corner of the gaol. Sixteen men were executed at Maitland Gaol between 1849 and 1897 – all for rape or murder. There is still debate as to where some of these executions took place throughout the gaol. The last man executed at Maitland was Charles Hines in May 1897 for allegedly raping his stepdaughter; however, he claimed he was innocent until he took his last breath. In New South Wales, the last corporal punishment occurred at the Maitland Gaol – a whipping, in 1905.

Construction on the eastern extension was completed in 1900. Work included perimeter walls, watch towers, women's cell range, workshops and female warders quarters.

Maitland became a maximum-security prison in 1972.

In 1975 inmates rioted, setting fire to the maintenance block. They used a swag of homemade weapons to attack the prison wardens, protesting about the prison system and the gaol's conditions. The infamous Darcy Dugan was blamed for inciting the riot, while 78 of the rioting inmates were transferred to other prisons. Damage resulting from the riot was estimated at A$100,000.

In 1977, Raymond Denning and six others escaped through an exhaust vent in the shower block. They were all back inside in two hours after a massive police sweep on the area.

In 1978, a 23-year-old inmate protested for 16 hours by sitting on top of the gaol's administration building. At one stage he disappeared over the roof returning with food. Armed with a softwood stake, he waved to television and Maitland Mercury newspaper journalists.

A 5.5-metre (18 ft) long tunnel was discovered in Cell 7 in C Wing in 1980. The man who informed the warden of the tunnel had his throat cut so viciously his head swung back on his shoulders. His body was hidden with a sheet of plastic painted the same colour as the floor. The tunnel was filled in with two truckloads of concrete. There were many other escape attempts but most failed; of 32 attempted escapees, 31 were recaptured.

In 1993, a block of modern prison cells was built above the kitchens, designed to house only the prisoners who worked in the kitchens. These cells were designed to house, usually, only one inmate at a time. Only trusted inmates who showed good behaviour and had cooking skills worked in the kitchens.

Also built in 1993, 5-wing was a high-security cell block designed to house inmates who had committed heinous crimes or crimes against other inmates. 5-wing inmates had no contact with anyone at all. These inmates had their own exercise yards, which contained a shower. They were allowed in there for only one hour per day. This was the last cell block to be built before the gaol's closure in 1998. In this cell block was also a clinic designed to treat inmates who had swallowed razor blades or drugs.

In April 1996, state Minister for Corrective Services Bob Debus announced the closure of Maitland Gaol as part of an overhaul of the NSW prison system, as its accommodation and working conditions were no longer considered appropriate in the context of the Government's plans for correctional facilities.

In 1997, George Savvas and Ivan Milat had planned an escape from the gaol but were stopped by correctional officers. The day after the escape was planned for, Savvas was found dead in his cell after hanging himself. He and Milat were housed in the 5-wing cell block.

The gaol closed in January 1998. Maitland City Council was offered a 50-year lease in February 1999.

After operating the gaol since 2001, Maitland City Council voted to relinquish management of the gaol citing rising costs.

Since 2024, the site has been closed due to fire and electrical safety issues.

== Description ==
The Maitland Gaol complex is positioned on top of the main hill at East Maitland. It is the focal point of the town and an important confirmation of the axial town planning concept of the Surveyor General of that time, Sir Thomas Mitchell.

Made mainly of sandstone and metal roofing, the building structures are set out on the same north-west bearing as the predominant street pattern of East Maitland. The cell block Wings "A" and "B" were located symmetrically about the Gate House axis in the 1840s being of equal distance from the axis.

The houses of the Governor of the Jail and of the Lieutenant-Governor project forwards from the gaol wall to form a court, with the main entrance at the far end.

The newer extension on the western side is of red coloured brick.

== Heritage listing ==
On 2 April 1999 the Maitland Correctional Centre was listed on the New South Wales State Heritage Register with the following statement of significance:

Maitland Gaol is of considerable significance because it is the oldest substantially intact country gaol in NSW. It is Australia's oldest structure in continuous use as a gaol. It is the only surviving example of the group of "Inspectors' Gaols" designed by the Colonial Architect in NSW and built during the 1840s. Together with the courthouse, it provides an elevated focal point at the north-west end of William Street, the grand axis of the 1829 town plan. In addition, Maitland Gaol was built of local stone and has a substantially homogenous character of a 19th century stone precinct. It is a showcase of stone, iron and timber work from the 1840s to the 1890s, much of it executed by local and prison artisans.

— Statement of significance, New South Wales State Heritage Register.

== Notable prisoners ==
- Kevin Crump – Convicted for the double murder of James Ian Lamb and Virginia Morse when with accomplice Allan Baker
- Darcy Dugan – (1920–1991), bank robber.
- David Eastman – wrongly convicted of the assassination of AFP Assistant Commissioner Colin Winchester.
- Andrew Garforth – convicted of the kidnapping, sexual assault and murder of nine-year-old schoolgirl Ebony Simpson.
- Henry (Harry) Arthur Hooton – (1908–1961) unarmed robbery.
- Peter Macari – Extortionist who threatened to blow up a Qantas jet.
- Ivan Milat – Serial killer, responsible for the backpacker murders from 1989–1993 in the NSW Belanglo State Forest
- Neddy Smith – Sydney underworld figure and murderer.
- John Travers, Michael Murdoch, and brothers Michael, Leslie and Gary Murphy – convicted of the murder of Anita Cobby.
- Stephen 'Shorty' Jamieson, Matthew Elliott, and Bronson Blessington – convicted of the murder of Janine Balding.

== Tours ==
Visitors can take a self-guided audio tour of the historic prison or can take guided theme tours.

== Australian Museum of Clothing and Textiles ==
The "Australian Museum of Clothing and Textiles" is located in the Maitland Gaol and features clothing and accessories, textiles and related items.

== See also ==
- Punishment in Australia
