= Moorlands, South Australia =

Moorlands South Australia
- Coordinates: 35°17′29″S 139°38′39″E
- Population: 64 (SAL 2021)
- Postcode(s): 5301
- Elevation: 12 m (39 ft)
- Location: 20 km (12 mi) east of Tailem Bend
- LGA(s): Coorong District Council
- State electorate(s): Hammond
- Federal division(s): Barker
Localities around Moorlands:
Naturi	Wynarka	Wynarka
Naturi; Tailem Bend; Elwomple; Cooke Plains	Moorlands	Sherlock
Cooke Plains	Cooke Plains; Coomandook; Sherlock	Sherlock
- Footnotes: Adjoining localities

Moorlands is a locality in the Australian state of South Australia.

Moorlands is located east of Murray Bridge and has farms that cultivate wheat, sheep and other livestock. It is on the Mallee Highway and Pinnaroo railway line. Its name is believed to be derived from Moorlands near London in England.

Lignite coal was first discovered in the vicinity of Moorlands in 1910. Further exploration and assessment was conducted in the 1920s and 1940s. Despite apparent enthusiasm at the time, the Moorlands coalfield was never developed, with the state government choosing to develop the larger coal deposit at Leigh Creek instead.

== Population ==
The Australian Bureau of Statistics provides the following 2021 data:

People

- 56.9% Male
- 43.1% Female
- Median Age: 46

== See also ==
- List of cities and towns in South Australia
