= Jaensch =

Jaensch is a surname. Notable people with the surname include:

- Chelsea Jaensch (born 1985), Australian athlete specialising in the long jump
- Dean Jaensch (born 1936), Australian political scientist and a retired Professor of Political and International Studies
- George Jaensch (1872–1958), Australian Overland Telegraph operator and post master
- Matthew Jaensch (born 1989), Australian rules football player
- Roger Jaensch (born 1971), Australian politician
- Christian Jaensch (born 1796), Immigrant from Kay, Brandenburg, Prussia. One of the original trustees of Hahndorf
