= Elwomple, South Australia =

Elwomple
- Town
- Coordinates: 35.29°S 139.55°E
- Country: Australia
- State: South Australia
- LGA: The Coorong District Council

Government
  - State electorate: Electoral district of Hammond
  - Federal division: Division of Barker
- Elevation: 12 m (39 ft)

Population
  - Total: 90 (SAL 2021)
- Postcode: 5260
Localities around Elwomple
Tailem Bend
	Elwomple	Moorlands
	Cooke Plains

Elwomple is a locality in The Coorong District Council in the South Australian Murray Mallee, southeast of Tailem Bend. The northwest corner is the junction of the Mallee Highway which forms the northern boundary of Elwomple, and the Dukes Highway which forms the southwestern boundary. The Bend Motorsport Park was developed in Elwomple adjacent to this junction. In September 2017, before the facility opened, the boundary between Tailem Bend and Elwomple was adjusted so that The Bend Motorsport Park was officially in Tailem Bend, not Elwomple.

The Elwomple railway station was on the Pinnaroo railway line which runs along the north side of the Mallee Highway. The Adelaide–Wolseley railway line is adjacent to the south side of the Dukes Highway. The siding opened for goods and passengers in December 1914, administered by the stationmaster at Sherlock.
