= Tailem Bend, South Australia =

Tailem Bend
- Town
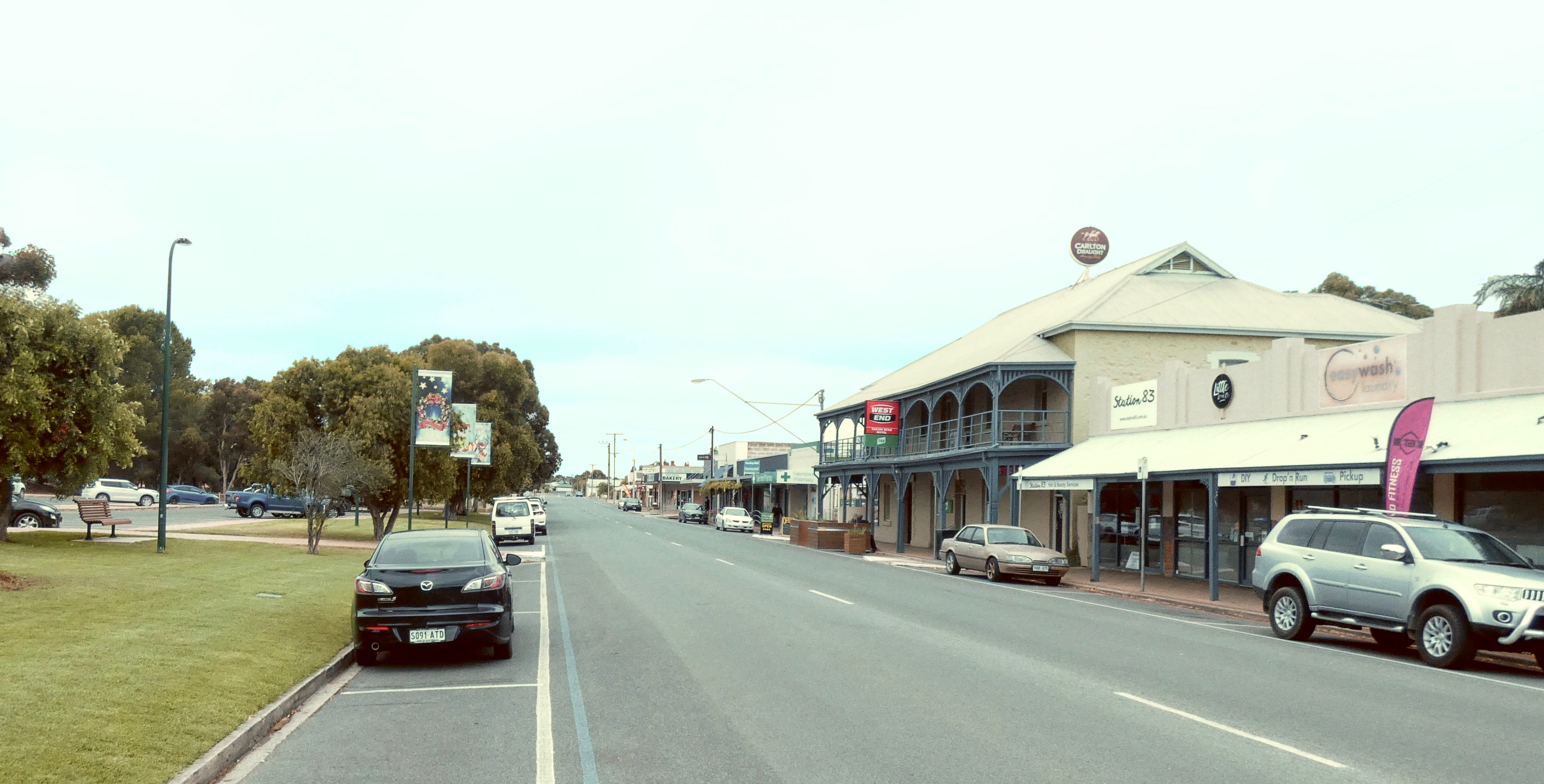
- Railway Terrace

- Coordinates: 35°15′0″S 139°27′0″E
- Country: Australia
- State: South Australia
- LGA: Coorong District Council
- Location: 97 km (60 mi) SE of Adelaide (by road); 25 km (16 mi) SE of Murray Bridge
- Established: 1887

Government
  - State electorate: Hammond
  - Federal division: Barker

Population
  - Total: 1,412 (UCL 2021)
- Postcode: 5260
Localities around Tailem Bend
Monteith	Kepa	Naturi
Woods Point, Jervois	Tailem Bend	Moorlands
Wellington East	Cooke Plains	Elwomple

Tailem Bend (locally, "Tailem") is a rural town in South Australia, 85 kilometres (53 miles) south-east of the state capital of Adelaide. It is located on the lower reaches of the River Murray, near where the river flows into Lake Alexandrina. It is linear in layout since it is constrained by river cliffs on its western side and the Adelaide–Melbourne railway line is dominant on its eastern side. The town grew and consolidated through being a large railway centre between the 1890s and 1990s; now it continues to service regional rural communities. In the 2021 census, Tailem Bend and the surrounding area had a population of 1,705.

== History ==
Prior to European settlement the area was inhabited for millennia by the indigenous Ngarrindjeri people, who made bark and reed canoes and lived on fish and animals dependent on the River Murray. (Note: It is customary in South Australia to use this word order when referring to the two major rivers of the state, as reflected in the naming principles issued by the Government of South Australia, which include: ... "'river' should be used as a generic term following the specific name of the feature – e.g. 'Onkaparinga River' – except when referring to the River Torrens or River Murray." South Australians may also place "River" first when referring to the Darling River, the major tributary that joins the Murray in New South Wales.) Once written as "Tail'em Bend", the town's name is the Ngarrindjeri word "thelim", meaning "bend", referring to the sharp bend that the river makes in this location. An alternative explanation is that this part of the river was "Thelum Ki", meaning "bent water".

In 1884, while building the railway line eastwards to the colony of Victoria, a track-laying gang set up camp among some native pine trees and named their site "Pine Camp". A township grew from there. In 1887, the year after the railway opened for traffic, "Tailem Bend" was proclaimed.

== Industry ==
Major industries in the area include pig farming, dairying, and growing grains, hay and olives. The head office of Coorong District Council is situated in the town. The Tailem Bend Solar Power Farm and The Bend Motorsport Park, respectively 2 kilometres (1.2 miles) and 5 kilometres (3.1 miles) south-east of the town, are significant recent additions to the region's economy.

The Tailem Bend railway centre was a large employer for much of the 20th century, providing refuelling, servicing and maintenance facilities for trains on the interstate railway line and rural lines radiating into the Murraylands to the north-east. The steep grades and sharp curves of the Mount Lofty Ranges towards Adelaide required steam locomotives with power at slow speeds; for the relatively straight and flat interstate line to the Victorian border, fast, large-wheeled locomotives were needed. In 1926, expanded facilities were opened, including a large roundhouse, as part of the reforms initiated by the South Australian Railways Commissioner William Webb. Diesel-electric locomotives introduced in the 1950s had wider power and speed ranges, and longer distances between refuelling, reducing the need for the facilities, and when government ownership of the railways gave way at the turn of the century to private operating companies running non-stop interstate freight trains, most of the facilities were demolished. However, a locomotive and rolling stock reconditioning company operated from the remaining premises.

== Transport ==
Tailem Bend is on Australia's principal highway, the A1, linking Adelaide and Melbourne; it is 20 kilometres (12 miles) from the end of the South Eastern Freeway to Adelaide. South of the town is the junction between the Princes and Dukes Highways. It is, however, a stopping place for interstate bus services. The Tailem Bend Ferry, a cable ferry, operates across the River Murray to Jervois.

The Adelaide-Melbourne railway passes through the town but the freight trains do not stop. Until 1999, The Overland train served Tailem Bend. A couple of broad gauge wheat-haulage country railway lines branched off at Tailem Bend to the towns of Moorook, Barmera, Waikerie, Peebinga, Loxton and Pinnaroo. These lines were progressively closed down in the 1970s, 80s and 90s due to a decline in rail transport and increase in road transport. The last of these lines were the Loxton railway line and Pinnaroo railway line which closed in July 2015.

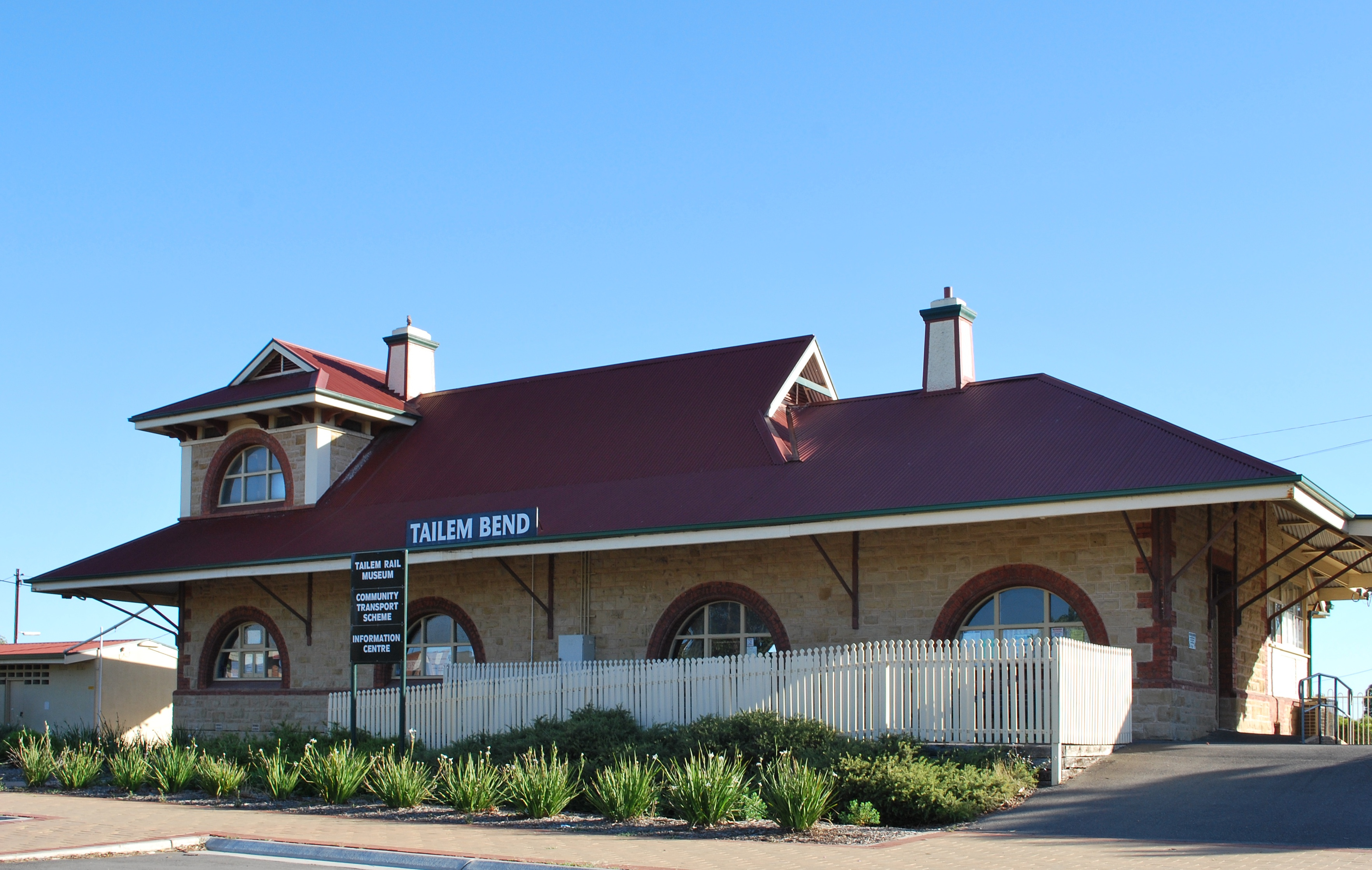
Tailem Bend station building in 2010

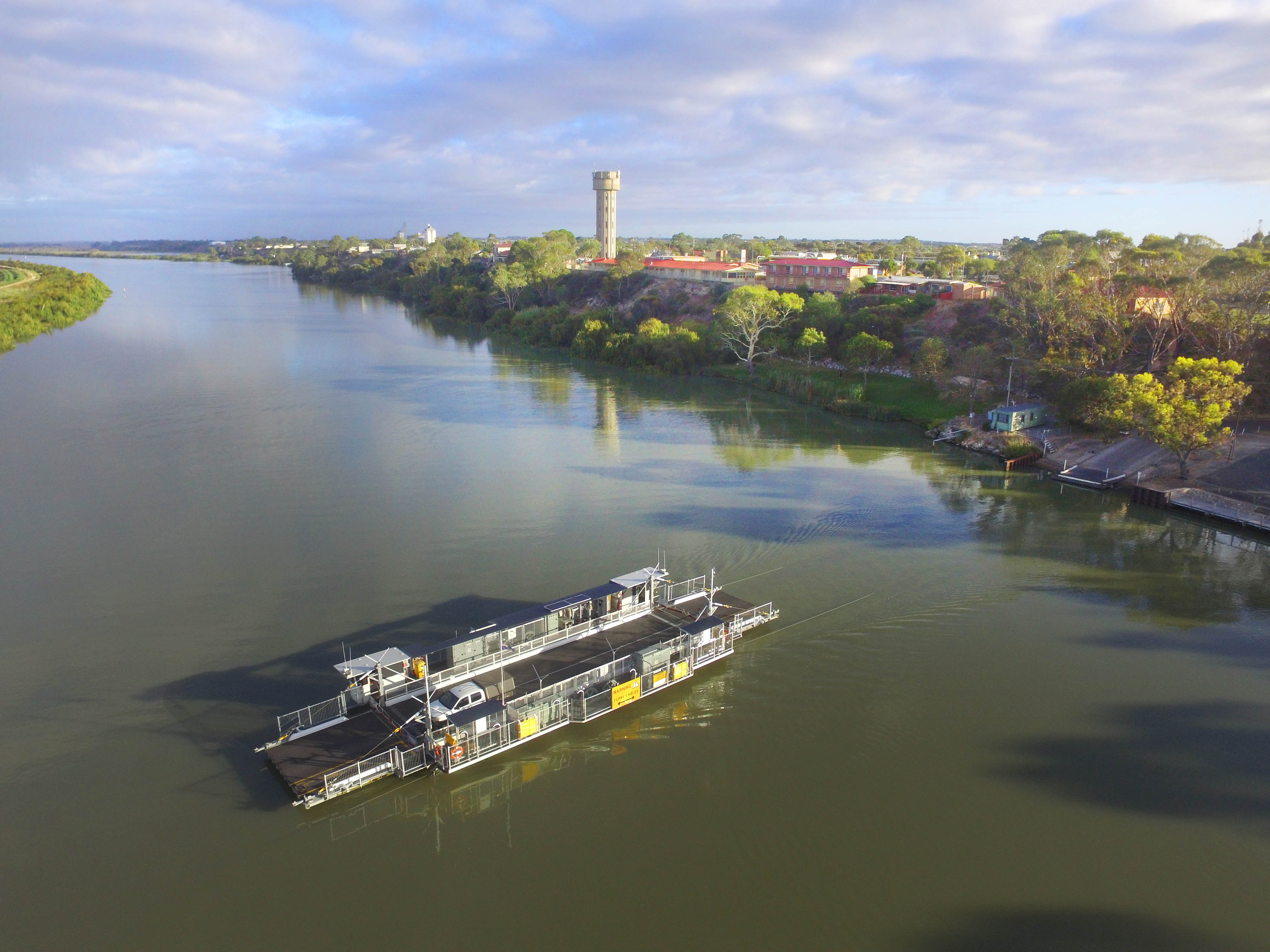
Cable ferry on River Murray at Tailem Bend

From Tailem Bend south-eastwards, the Dukes Highway is a direct route to Melbourne; the Princes Highway runs along the Coorong and coast towards Melbourne, and the Mallee Highway east towards Sydney. There is also a road connecting to the Karoonda Highway leading to Loxton and the Riverland. Tailem Bend is a common stopping point for truck drivers travelling to and/or from Adelaide, as there are no fuel or food outlets with truck facilities on the South Eastern Freeway.

== The Bend motorsport park ==
Since 2018, when the first Supercars Championship race meeting was held, The Bend Motorsport Park has operated a racing track rated by Formula One winner Mark Webber as world-class. In addition to major events the park offers hot laps, track days, driver experiences and go-karting, and hosts car club events. The OTR SuperSprint is an annual event. The park was the venue of the 25th Australian Scout Jamboree for 11 days in 2019.

== Old Tailem Town Pioneer Village ==
Old Tailem Town is a privately owned museum that consists of over 110 historical buildings, including corner stores, emporiums, dance halls, hospitals, dentists, chemists, barbers, butchers, bakers, saddlers, clock shops, bootmakers, pubs, stables, police stations, coach and bike shops and the Cobb & Co terminus. It is Australia's largest pioneer village and it depicts the times from 1920 to 1960 in Tailem Bend.

== Notable people ==
Notable people from or who have lived in Tailem Bend include:

- George Jaensch, Northern Territorian telegraph operator and post master, and South Australian farmer and grazier
- David Unaipon, preacher, inventor and author who is featured on the Australian $50 note
- Brooke Krueger 2006 Commonwealth Games gold medallist (women's hammer throw).

== See also ==
- List of crossings of the Murray River
