= Tailem Bend Solar Power Farm =

Photovoltaic power station in Tailem Bend, Australia

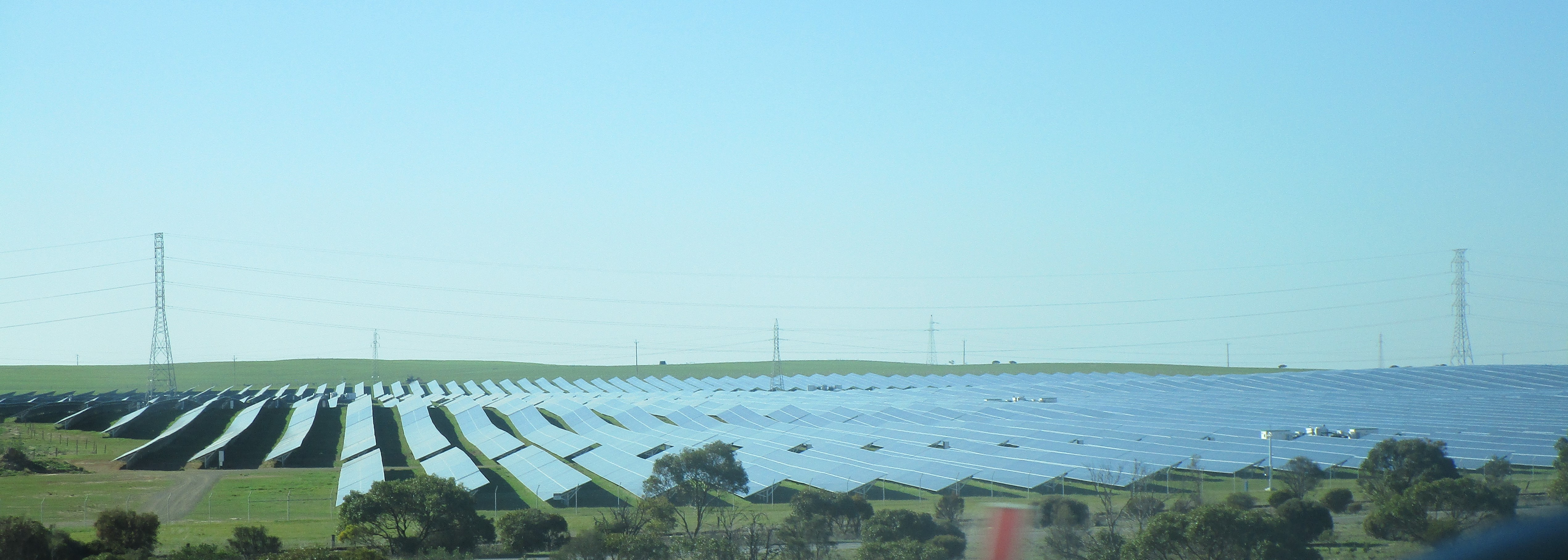
- Tailem Bend Solar Farm
- Country: Australia
- Location: Tailem Bend, South Australia
- Coordinates: 35.28°S 139.49°E
- Status: Operational
- Construction began: April 2018
- Commission date: 30 May 2019
- Construction cost: A$200m
- Owner: Vena Energy (subsidiary of Global Infrastructure Partners)
- Operator: Vena Energy

Solar farm
- Type: Flat-panel PV
- Collectors: 391,500
- Site area: 200 hectares (490 acres)

Power generation
- Nameplate capacity: 95 MW (licence limit)

External links
- Commons: Related media on Commons

The Tailem Bend Solar Power Farm is a solar power farm near Tailem Bend in South Australia. It has 108MW of generation capacity but is limited to supplying 95MW to the national grid. An additional 85MW is proposed in stage 2. It is developed and owned by Singapore-based Vena Energy, a new name for the former Equis Energy following acquisition by Global Infrastructure Partners in January 2018. The output will be sold to Snowy Hydro for retail sale under its Lumo Energy brand. Stage 2 is also expected to provide battery storage.

The solar farm covers 200 hectares (490 acres) of land with more than 390,000 photovoltaic solar panels. The panels are mounted on fixed-angle racks. The site is a joint development between Equis and Snowy Hydro. Snowy Hydro also had plans to establish a 28MW diesel generator at the site.

UGL was contracted in February 2018 to build the first stage, which was expected to be connected to the power grid in the first quarter of 2019. A second stage to generate an additional 111MW is also being planned.

The Tailem Bend solar farm received its generation licence on 30 January 2019, and was expected to start commissioning in February, with full production from mid-April. Its theoretical capacity is 108MW, but the licence limits it to 95MW to ensure it can deliver reactive power to the grid. The 95MW Tailem Bend solar farm began production on 4 March 2019 and officially opened on 30 May 2019. Vena Energy expects to proceed with the completion of stage two of the Tailem Bend solar farm, which will be similar in scale to the first stage. Vena Energy also has plans for a Tailem Bend Battery Energy Storage Project. The plan for a nearby diesel generator has been dropped.
