= John Marsden (lawyer) =

Australian lawyer (1942–2006)

John Marsden AM
- Born: John Robert Marsden; 3 January 1942; Lismore, Australia
- Died: 17 May 2006 (aged 64); Turkey
- Occupations: Solicitor, president of the Law Society of New South Wales
- Years active: 1968–2006
- Known for: Defamation case against the Seven network, LGBT activist
- Notable work: Defence Lawyer of serial killer Ivan Milat

John Robert Marsden AM (3 January 1942 – 17 May 2006) was an Australian solicitor and former President of the Law Society of New South Wales. He was known for his high-profile clients, his gay rights activism, and his victory in a defamation action against the Seven Network.

== Early life and career ==
Born in Lismore, Marsden attended a Catholic school in Cabramatta, St John's Preparatory College in Campbelltown and St Joseph's College, Hunters Hill, before entering a seminary to study for the priesthood. After deciding the priesthood was not for him, he completed a law degree at the University of Sydney, graduating in 1966 with a Bachelor of Laws. In 1968 Marsden established Marsdens, a law firm in Campbelltown. The firm grew from Marsden as a sole practitioner to being among the largest law firms in the Sydney area with 140 personnel and offices in Sydney, Liverpool, Camden, and Campbelltown. Marsden was a prominent resident of Campbelltown throughout his life and was often quoted as saying "There are two great cities in the world - Rome and Campbelltown." In 1974, Marsden was awarded a Master of Laws.

Marsden held a number of prominent positions throughout his career including President of the Law Society of New South Wales, President of the New South Wales Council for Civil Liberties and member of the New South Wales Police Board.

Contesting the seat of Campbelltown in the 1973 state election for the Liberals, Marsden was unsuccessful.

== Clients ==
Serial killer Ivan Milat was a client of Marsden. Marsden had a long association with the Milat family and had successfully represented Ivan Milat on charges of rape in the 1970s. Milat sacked Marsden shortly after being arrested in 1994 for the Backpacker murders. In 2005, after falling ill with cancer, Marsden indicated his belief that Milat had had an accomplice, and expressed some regrets about his success in helping Milat avoid conviction on the earlier rape charges. He recounted an incident that had happened during trial on those charges: after the first day in court, during which Milat appeared likely to be convicted, Marsden - then a closeted homosexual - went to a gay bar and noticed the two alleged victims there. The next day in court he outed them as lesbians and relied on the jury's prejudices to attack their credibility and win acquittal for Milat.

In 2004, Marsden accepted an invitation from British/Italian lawyer Giovanni di Stefano to join Saddam Hussein's defence team. Marsden was receiving treatment for stomach cancer at the time, and it is unclear how active his involvement in the case was; the trial was still ongoing at the time of Marsden's death.

== Seven Network defamation incident ==
Deirdre Grusovin, a member of the New South Wales Legislative Assembly, speaking under parliamentary privilege in 1994, accused Marsden of having sex with minors. In 1995 and 1996, the Seven Network's shows Today Tonight and Witness also aired allegations of having sex with minors against Marsden. In response, Marsden described himself as a "promiscuous homosexual" but denied allegations of paedophilia. Channel Seven produced witnesses who claimed to have sex with Marsden while underage, but many were discredited by errors on points of fact, such as the type of house Marsden lived in and, in one case, whether he was circumcised.

In 2001, after 214 days of hearings, Justice David Levine ruled that Seven had failed to prove its allegations of child sexual abuse. Marsden was awarded A$525,000 in damages and legal costs; Marsden's legal costs were estimated at around A$6 million; Seven's own costs at that stage were estimated at A$10–12 million.

Although Levine ruled in Marsden's favour on the allegations of child sexual abuse, his findings were deeply critical of Marsden in other regards. He found that Marsden had lied about several issues in the trial, notably his role in drafting a statutory declaration by one of the witnesses. He also found that on the balance of probabilities, Marsden had used convicted rapist and murderer Les Murphy to persuade a witness to change his position, and had probably persuaded two other witnesses to influence another. According to then Sydney Star Observer editor Marcus O'Donnell, Marsden asked the Observer to publish the names of one of the prosecution witnesses, when there was a suppression order given on the grounds that the witness's life would be in danger if the name were published.

Legal commentator Richard Ackland described the case as "probably the biggest piece of civil litigation NSW has seen for many years... without doubt the largest, longest and most comprehensive defamation case in the history of Australia. And probably one of the biggest in the history of the common law world." In 2002, the New South Wales Court of Appeal ruled that the compensation payout should have included consideration for hurt feelings, and ordered a new trial on damages. Marsden and Seven subsequently came to a confidential out-of-court settlement, estimated by various parties as somewhere between A$6 million and A$9 million.

Despite questionable behaviour toward witnesses and questions of truthfulness during the trial, Marsden emerged victorious over Channel Seven. Marsden denied abusing minors, and a number of such accusers were labelled unreliable witnesses. One of the witnesses, who had previously made a claim for compensation that had been rejected, made a second claim (which took place during the period of the defamation trial itself). This action overturned the previous decision. "Judge Coorey overturned a decision of Magistrate Jacqueline Milledge, sitting as the Victims Compensation Tribunal and was satisfied on the balance of probabilities that compensable acts of violence by five men, including John Marsden had taken place against "X"...." Other accusers documented their own alleged abuse in other proceedings. Marsden was not subsequently charged on the basis of the compensation judgement.

== Illness and death ==
Marsden died of stomach cancer while on holiday in Turkey on 17 May 2006, attended on his last night by two Catholic clerics, Father Peter Confeggi, a long-time personal friend, and Father Gerald Iverson. He had been battling the disease for four years. He was buried, according to his wishes, in a solemn Catholic Requiem Mass at St John's Church, Campbelltown.

Five hundred mourners attended, among them former Prime Minister of Australia Gough Whitlam, and the eulogy was delivered by The Hon Justice Michael Kirby AC CMG, then a puisne Justice of the High Court of Australia.

Kirby spoke of Marsden as a pioneer for openly gay people in the law. He left part of his estate to gay and lesbian organisations and to the City of Campbelltown.

== Honours and legacy ==
In 1994, Marsden was appointed a Member of the Order of Australia for his service to the Law Society of New South Wales and the community.

In 2002 he received a Gold Medal Award for services to the Returned Services' League movement.

Marsden bequeathed gifts to the City of Campbelltown for the establishment of a fountain to recognise "the close association between the two cities"; a private art collection, estimated at the time of his death to be worth A$1.3 million to the Campbelltown Arts Centre, now known as the Marsden Collection; and two scholarships were endowed with A$100,000 each to help Indigenous Australian and gay and lesbian students from the Campbelltown area to complete tertiary education.

In 2008, Rights Australia, a non-profit lobby group, established the John Marsden Lecture, with the inaugural lecture delivered by Justice Michael Kirby.

== Published works ==
- Marsden, John (May 1985). "Drug addiction: a community responsibility". Law Society Journal. 23 (4). Sydney: 282–283. ISSN 0818-5263.
- Marsden, John (1982). Ration neither justice nor our efforts towards a better society - as President of the Law Society of New South Wales (Speech). Annual Members' dinner. Reproduced in "Law Society Journal". 30 (11). Sydney. December 1992: 62–63. ISSN 0818-5263.
- Marsden, John (1983). Commentary - on Sweeney, P.H. Apparent defects in legislation relating to street behaviour (Speech). Seminar on Street Offences. Sydney. Reproduced in "Proceedings of the Institute of Criminology" (56). 1983: 46–58. ISSN 0085-7033.
- Marsden, John (1983). "National Crimes Commission?". Proceedings of the Institute of Criminology (58): 83–87. ISSN 0085-7033.
- Marsden, John (1985). The scope of human rights (Speech). Human Rights Protection in Australia Conference. University of New South Wales. Reproduced as "The scope of human rights". Civil Liberty (120). Sydney: 18–19. 1986.
- Marsden, John (1985). "Heroin: a civil liberties perspective". Civil Liberty (115). Sydney: 16–17.
- Marsden, John (3 April 1992). Accessible justice - transforming wish into reality (Speech). Access to Justice Seminar. Sydney, NSW.
- Gross, B. J; Gleeson, A. M.; Marsden, John; Black, Peter (Mayor) (1992). On the occasion of the opening of the Supreme Court, Broken Hill (Speech). Broken Hill.
- Marsden, John (c. 2004). I am what I am: my life and curious times. Camberwell, Victoria, Australia: Penguin. p. 389. ISBN 0-670-04052-5.
