= Ivan Milat =

Australian serial killer (1944–2019)

- Milat in 1971
- Born: Ivan Robert Marko Milat; 27 December 1944; Guildford, New South Wales, Australia
- Died: 27 October 2019 (aged 74); Long Bay Correctional Centre; Matraville, New South Wales, Australia
- Other names: The Backpacker Killer; The Backpacker Murderer; Tex; Bargo Bill; Joe Spanner; Mac
- Employer: Roads & Traffic Authority
- Known for: Backpacker murders
- Convictions: Murder (7 counts); Attempted murder False imprisonment Robbery
- Penalty: 7 life sentences without the possibility of parole (murder); 6 years' imprisonment (attempted murder); 6 years' imprisonment (false imprisonment); 6 years' imprisonment (robbery)

Details
- Victims: 7+ (possibly 39)
- Span of crimes: 1989–1992
- Country: Australia
- State: New South Wales
- Weapons: .22-calibre Ruger 10/22; Bowie knife
- Date apprehended: 22 May 1994
- Imprisoned at: Long Bay Correctional Centre (2019); Goulburn Correctional Centre (1997–2019); Maitland Gaol (1996–1997)

Ivan Robert Marko Milat (Croatian: [iʋan marko milat]; 27 December 1944 – 27 October 2019), commonly referred to in media as the Backpacker Murderer, was an Australian serial killer who was convicted for the abduction, assault, robbery and murder of two men and five women in New South Wales between 1989 and 1992. His modus operandi was to approach backpackers along the Hume Highway under the guise of providing them transport to areas of southern New South Wales, then take his victims into the Belanglo State Forest where he would incapacitate and murder them. Milat is also suspected of having committed many other similar offences around Australia, some dating as far back as 1962.

== Early life ==
Ivan Milat was born on 27 December 1944, to Croatian emigrant and labourer Stjepan Marko "Steven" Milat (1902–1983) and Margaret Elizabeth Piddleston (1920–2001), an Australian national. Ivan was the fifth of their 14 children.

The impoverished Milat family initially lived on a rural weatherboard cottage farm in Bossley Park, 36 kilometres west of Sydney, before relocating to Liverpool, New South Wales. By all accounts, Milat's parents were conscientious in raising, educating, and disciplining their children, and sent them all to Catholic schools. However, family members described Milat's father as having a temper due to his alcoholism. Many of the ten Milat boys were well known to local police and were used to handling knives and firearms, spending their afternoons shooting at targets in their parents’ yard.

Siblings recalled Milat displaying antisocial and psychopathic behaviour at a young age, such as attacking animals with machetes, leading to a stint in a residential school at age 13. By age 17, he was in a juvenile detention centre for theft, and at age 19 he was involved in a shop break-in. In 1964, Milat was sentenced to 18 months for breaking and entering, and a month after release he was arrested for driving a stolen car and sentenced to two years' hard labour. In September 1967, aged 22, he was sentenced to three years' imprisonment for theft.

On 7 April 1971, Milat abducted two 18-year-old female hitchhikers near Liverpool railway station with a knife. He raped one of the hitchhikers before they stopped at a petrol station café, where they managed to escape. Milat was arrested later that day and charged with one count of rape and two counts of armed robbery. While awaiting trial, Milat was involved in a string of robberies with some of his brothers before faking his suicide by leaving his shoes at The Gap, a well-known Sydney suicide site.

Authorities believe that Milat then fled to Queensland and Victoria before flying to New Zealand, where he lived for two years. However, he is suspected of having returned surreptitiously using a fake passport and lived interstate to avoid detection. Milat was rearrested in 1974 after his mother was taken to hospital suffering from a heart attack, but the robbery and kidnap cases against him failed at trial with the help of the Milats' family lawyer, John Marsden. Milat took on a job as a truck driver in 1975, and by the time of his arrest he had worked on and off for the Roads & Traffic Authority for 20 years. In 1977, Milat unsuccessfully attempted to rape and murder two women who were hitchhiking from Liverpool to Canberra, but he was never charged.

== Backpacker murders ==
=== Background ===
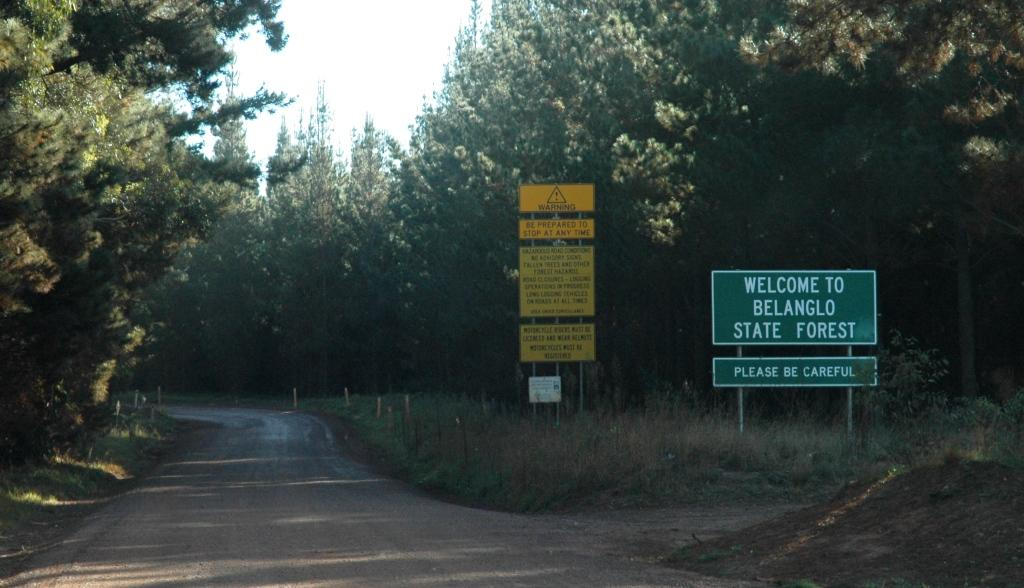
A sign at the entrance to the Belanglo State Forest in New South Wales

By the time of the initial discoveries in the Belanglo State Forest, several backpackers had disappeared. One case involved a young Victorian couple from Frankston, Deborah Everist and James Gibson (both 19), who had been missing since leaving Sydney for ConFest, near Albury, on 30 December 1989. Other related cases include: Simone Schmidl, 21, from Germany, who had been missing since leaving Sydney for Melbourne on 20 January 1991, a German couple, Gabor Neugebauer (21) and Anja Habschied (20), who disappeared after leaving a Kings Cross hostel for Mildura on 26 December 1991, and British backpackers Caroline Clarke (21) and Joanne Walters (22) who were last seen in Kings Cross on 18 April 1992.

=== Discovery of victims ===
On 19 September 1992, two runners discovered a concealed corpse while orienteering in Belanglo. The following morning, police discovered a second body 30 metres (100 ft) from the first. Police quickly confirmed, via dental records, that the bodies were those of Clarke and Walters. Walters had been stabbed fifteen times; four times in the chest, once in the neck and nine times in the back, which would have paralysed her. Clarke had been shot ten times in the head at the burial site, and police believe she had been used as target practice. After a thorough search of the forest, investigators ruled out the possibility of further discoveries.

On 5 October 1993, a local man searching for firewood discovered bones in a particularly remote section of Belanglo. He returned with police to the scene, where two bodies were quickly discovered and later identified as Gibson and Everist. Gibson's skeleton, found in a foetal position, showed eight stab wounds. A large knife had cut through his upper spine causing paralysis, and stab wounds to his back and chest would have punctured his heart and lungs. Everist had been savagely beaten; her skull was fractured in two places, her jaw was broken and there were knife marks on her forehead. She had been stabbed once in the back. The presence of Gibson's body in Belanglo puzzled investigators as his camera had previously been discovered on 31 December 1989, and his backpack later on 13 March 1990, by the side of the road at Galston Gorge, over 120 kilometres (75 mi) to the north.

On 1 November 1993, a skeleton was found in a clearing along a fire trail in Belanglo during a police sweep. It was later identified as that of Schmidl, and bore at least eight stab wounds: two had severed her spine and others would have punctured her heart and lungs. Clothing found at the scene was not Schmidl's, but matched that of another missing backpacker, Habschied. The bodies of Habschied and Neugebauer were then found on a nearby fire trail, on 4 November 1993, in shallow graves 50 metres (160 ft) apart. Habschied had been decapitated, and despite an extensive search her skull was never found. Neugebauer had been shot in the head six times. There was evidence that some of the victims did not die instantly from their injuries.

=== Search for a serial killer ===
Examination of the remains showed evidence that some of the victims had been tortured. In response, on 14 October 1993, Task Force Air, containing more than twenty detectives and analysts, was set up by the New South Wales Police. On 5 November, the New South Wales government increased the reward in relation to the killings to A$500,000. After developing their profile of the killer, the police faced an enormous volume of data from numerous sources. Investigators applied link analysis technology and, as a result, the list of suspects was narrowed from a short list of 230 to an even shorter list of thirty-two. Speculation arose that the crimes were the work of several killers, given that most of the victims had been attacked while as pairs, had been killed in different ways, and buried separately.

On 13 November, police were contacted by Paul Onions, 24, in the United Kingdom. A few years earlier, on 25 January 1990, Onions had been backpacking in Australia and, while hitchhiking from Liverpool station towards Mildura, had accepted a ride south out of Casula from a man known only as "Bill". South of the town of Mittagong, and less than one kilometre from Belanglo, Bill pulled out a revolver and some rope to rob Onions, at which point he managed to flee while Bill shot at him. Onions flagged down a passing motorist, Joanne Berry of Canberra, and together they described the assailant and his vehicle and registration number to the Bowral police. On 13 April 1994, detectives re-found the note regarding Onions' call. His statement was corroborated by Berry, along with the girlfriend of a man who worked with Milat.

=== Arrest and trial ===
Police surveillance of the Milat house at Cinnabar Street in Eagle Vale commenced on 26 February 1994. Police soon learned that Milat had recently sold his silver Nissan Patrol shortly after the discovery of the bodies of Clarke and Walters. Police also confirmed that Milat had not been working on any of the days of the attacks, and acquaintances also told police about Milat's obsession with weapons. When the connection between the Belanglo murders and Onions' experience was made, Onions flew to Australia to help with the investigation. On 5 May 1994, he positively identified Milat as the man who had picked him up and attempted to shoot him.

Milat was arrested at his house on 22 May on robbery and weapons charges related to the Onions attack after fifty police officers surrounded the house. The search of the residence revealed various weapons, including a .22-calibre Anschütz Model 1441/42 rifle and parts of a .22-calibre Ruger 10/22 rifle that matched the type used in the murders, a Browning pistol, and a Bowie knife. Also uncovered were items belonging to several of the victims. Homes belonging to Milat's mother and five of his brothers were also searched, uncovering several more items belonging to victims.

Milat appeared in court on 23 May, but he did not enter a plea. On 31 May, he was additionally charged with the seven backpacker murders. On 28 June, Milat sacked John Marsden, his family's lawyer, and sought legal aid to pay for his defence. Meanwhile, brothers Richard and Walter were tried in relation to weapons, drugs and stolen items found on their properties. A committal hearing for Milat regarding the murders began on 24 October and lasted until 12 December, during which over two hundred witnesses appeared. Based on the evidence, at the beginning of February 1995, Milat was remanded in custody until June that same year.

Milat's trial opened at the Supreme Court of New South Wales in Sydney on 26 March 1996 and was prosecuted by Mark Tedeschi. Despite the overwhelming evidence against him, Milat is reported as having been confident he would be found innocent. In phone recordings made for the ABC's Australian Story program in 2004, Milat stated his grounds for believing he would be found innocent at trial: "My basic defense in my trial was that it wasn't me. I don't know who did it. It was up to them to prove my guilt, not for me to prove my innocence." His defence argued that, in spite of the evidence, there was no non-circumstantial proof Milat was guilty and attempted to shift the blame to other members of his family, particularly Richard. 145 witnesses took the stand, including members of the Milat family who endeavoured to provide alibis. On 18 June, Milat gave evidence himself.

On 27 July 1996, after eighteen weeks of testimony, a jury found Milat guilty of the murders. He was given a life sentence on each count without the possibility of parole. He was also convicted of the attempted murder, false imprisonment and robbery of Onions, for which he received six years' imprisonment each.

== Victims ==
=== 1989 ===
- 30 December: Australians Deborah Everist and James Gibson, both 19, left Melbourne. The couple first went to Sydney, where they stayed at a backpacker hostel in the inner-city suburbs. After checking out, they were last seen heading for ConFest, planning to hitchhike to Albury. A day after they were last seen, a bushwalker found Gibson's camera by the road at Galston Gorge in northern Sydney. The person took the damaged camera home, and only reported it when Gibson's empty backpack was found in the same area a month later and was linked to the couple's missing persons report. Both were found in Belanglo State Forest on 5 October 1993 with Gibson being stabbed and Everist being beaten to death.

=== 1991 ===
- 20 January: German Simone Schmidl, 20, set off to hitchhike from Sydney. She told acquaintances that she was off to Melbourne to meet her mother, who was flying in from Germany to join her for a camping holiday. She was last seen at a train station preparing to leave for western Sydney where she was attempting to hitchhike. On 1 November 1993, Schmidl's body was found in Belanglo State Forest; she had died after suffering numerous stab wounds, one of which went through her spinal column.
- 26 December: German backpackers Gabor Neugebauer, 21, and Anja Habschied, 20, left the Backpackers Inn at Kings Cross, Sydney, to hitchhike to Adelaide and Darwin. On 4 November 1993, both were found in Belanglo State Forest, where it was determined that Neugebauer had been bound and shot six times while his partner, Habschied, had been beheaded.

=== 1992 ===
- 18 April: British citizens Joanne Walters, 22, and Caroline Clarke, 21, left Kings Cross to hitchhike together around Australia. They were headed for Victoria to pick fruit and made it to the Bulli Pass, near Wollongong, where they reportedly asked for directions to the Hume Highway. On 19 September 1992, both were found in Belanglo State Forest. Walters had been stabbed and Clarke had been shot 11 times.

== Incarceration and appeals ==
On his first day at Maitland Gaol, Milat was beaten by another inmate. Almost a year later, on 16 May 1997, he made an escape attempt alongside convicted drug dealer and former Sydney councillor George Savvas. The plan failed and Savvas was found hanged in his cell the next day. Milat was subsequently transferred to the maximum-security section at Goulburn Correctional Centre.

In November 1997, Milat appealed against his convictions due to a breach of his common law right to legal representation, as established in Dietrich v The Queen. However, the New South Wales Court of Criminal Appeal dismissed the appeal. In 2004, Milat filed an application with the High Court of Australia that he be allowed special leave to appeal on new grounds. The application for leave was ultimately dismissed, affirming the Court of Criminal Appeal's decision to disallow his initial appeal. On 27 October 2005, in the New South Wales Supreme Court, Milat's final avenue of appeal was refused. In 2006, two other application attempts were rejected as well, as was one in November 2011. In 2001, Milat was transferred to one of the forty-five new units at the High Risk Management Corrections Centre (Supermax) at Goulburn Correctional Centre. In 2006, a toaster and television given to Milat in his cell caused a public outcry.

== Final years and death ==
In his 2004 interview on Australian Story, Milat denied that any of his family had been involved in the seven murders. On 26 January 2009, Milat cut off his little finger with a plastic knife with the intention of mailing it to the High Court of Australia to force an appeal. He was taken to Goulburn Base Hospital under high security; however, on 27 January, Milat was returned to prison after doctors decided surgery was not possible. Milat had previously harmed himself in 2001, when he swallowed razor blades, staples and other metal objects. In May 2011, he went on a nine-day hunger strike, losing 25 kilograms in an unsuccessful attempt to be given a PlayStation 3.

In May 2019, Milat was transferred to the Prince of Wales Hospital, Randwick, and was subsequently diagnosed with terminal esophageal cancer. Following his treatment he was transferred to the Long Bay Correctional Centre to continue his custodial sentences. On 9 August 2019, a terminally ill Milat was moved to a secure treatment unit located at the Prince of Wales Hospital following the loss of twenty kilograms in previous weeks; he was also exhibiting a high temperature. His status, however, was reported as not life-threatening. On 27 October 2019, Milat died from esophagus and stomach cancer at 4:07 a.m. within the hospital wing at Long Bay Correctional Centre. He was 74.

Prior to his death, Milat wrote a letter to his family asking for his funeral expenses to be covered by the New South Wales government. This request was denied by the New South Wales Corrections Minister Anthony Roberts. Consequently, his body was cremated, with the costs reimbursed from his prison account. In his final days, New South Wales Police stated that their officers visited Milat eight times, both in prison and in the hospital, to try to obtain a confession from him, but he did not confess. Various strategies were used during these visits, including different combinations of detectives and the use of recorded interviews with victims' families as an investigative technique, yet no additional information was provided to the police. Although Milat never officially confessed, he reportedly admitted to his mother, with whom he had a close bond, that he was responsible for the backpacker murders.

== Additional investigations ==
Police maintain that Milat could have been involved in more murders than the seven for which he was convicted. State and territory-wide investigations into the unsolved deaths and disappearances of young persons were started in 1993 by Task Force Air by comparing Milat's known criminal and victim profile along with his known modus operandi to cold cases. Their list ran to 58 people, and included individuals from the United States, the United Kingdom, Germany, Italy and New Zealand. Milat was very geographically mobile due to his employment as a truck driver in the mid-1970s, transporting tyres via Sydney, Canberra, Brisbane, Gold Coast, Newcastle, Wollongong, Melbourne, Adelaide and Perth. Based on almost identical similarities in modus operandi, three unsolved murder victims were identified who task force commander Clive Small listed as having a high possibility of being Milat's victims:

- On 26 February 1971, expectant mother 20-year-old Keren Rowland and her sister were travelling in separate vehicles to a motel in Canberra. However, Rowland never showed up and her abandoned car was discovered that evening in an undeveloped location. The next day, while working in Liverpool, Milat allegedly boasted to co-workers about having murdered someone and buried the body under bushland. On 3 May, at the Air Disaster Memorial in the Fairburn Pine Plantation near Canberra, Keren's bones were discovered 15 metres off a footpath. Her cause of death was not established, and the murder scene was eventually contrasted with those at Belanglo twenty years later. Milat was aged 26 at the time of Rowland's murder and worked at the Department of Main Roads, which meant he frequently drove between Liverpool and Canberra. Milat is also believed to have driven a gold-coloured Ford Fairmont similar to one seen by eyewitnesses chasing a woman matching Rowland's description in Canberra on the night of her disappearance. Rowland's presumed murder was never solved.
- On 13 November 1987, unemployed 18-year-old Peter Letcher set off to hitchhike to his parents' house in Bathurst but never arrived. His bones were found by bushwalkers on a woodland track close to the Jenolan Caves tourist site on 21 January 1988. Letcher's body was found lying face-up in a small ditch full of leaves and branches. He had been handcuffed, shot five times in the head with a .22 calibre gun, repeatedly stabbed in the back, and possibly sexually assaulted. According to Milat's estranged wife, in the days preceding Letcher's disappearance Milat took her once to the Jenolan State Forest to see a dirt track and a pine plantation, since he was working in the area. Letcher's murder took place shortly after Milat's wife left him.
- On 6 September 1991, 29-year-old mother Dianne Pennacchio travelled to the Lake George Hotel in Bungendore. She informed a friend she planned to hitchhike back to Queanbeyan, and at approximately 11 p.m. she left the motel alone and headed toward the Kings Highway. On 13 November 1991, two employees of the forestry commission in the Tallaganda State Forest, forty kilometres south of Bungendore and southwest of Canberra, discovered a person wrapped in pine branches, lying face-down. She was wearing only her underwear and trousers, and her seventh thoracic vertebra had been stabbed. A knife wound to the spine causing paralysis fitted Milat's modus operandi. The way her clothes were arranged implied that she had been sexually assaulted. Pennacchio's murder took place during Milat's known killing spree; she was murdered between the January 1991 slaying of Schmidl and the murders of Neugebauer and Habschied that December.

Other cases of interest which were investigated included a series of unsolved disappearances of young women in the Hunter Region in Northern NSW that were originally thought to be the responsibility of a separate unidentified serial killer:

- On 30 December 1978, Leanne Goodall (20) was left off by her brother at the Muswellbrook railway station. She travelled to Newcastle to meet her parents before departing for Sydney. At 3.30 p.m. that day, Goodall was last seen at Newcastle's Star Hotel. She was reported missing in February 1979. Milat was a road worker in the Newcastle area in late 1978 and early 1979 and was known to frequent the Star Hotel.
- Robyn Hickie (18) went missing four months after Goodall disappeared on 7 April 1979. She was last seen at 7:15 p.m. at a bus stop opposite her home on the Pacific Highway at Belmont North. Police closed their brief investigation on the assumption she had disappeared of her own accord. A later witness claimed to have seen Milat at the Belmont Hotel on the night before Hickie vanished.
- Amanda Robinson (14) disappeared on 21 April 1979 while returning home to Swansea following a high school dance in Gateshead. She got off a bus and was last seen walking along Lake Road. Police started a thorough investigation, but the teen's case ultimately went unsolved.
- Amanda Zolis (16) was last seen on 12 October 1979 when a neighbour walked her to a bus stop on Tudor Street in Hamilton at 6.30 pm. Zolis was en route to Newcastle's Christian Coffee Shop on Hunter Street. At 10.15 p.m. she called her father from Hamilton South, Newcastle, saying that she needed clothing since she planned to visit Queensland. She has not been seen or heard from since. Her disappearance is suspected to have been related to other disappearances in the area, but no evidence has been found to support this.
- Annette Briffa (18) was last seen in Asquith, a neighbourhood in northern Sydney, on 10 January 1980. She had been residing on the Central Coast as well as in the neighbourhood. She was last seen hitchhiking on the Pacific Highway between Mount Colah and Asquith, in the direction of Hornsby. According to one eyewitness, she entered an orange Mazda car or a similar vehicle.
- Susan Isenhood (22) vanished from the Mayfield neighbourhood of Newcastle after being dropped off by her brother close to the Stag and Hunter Hotel, before she hitchhiked to Taree. Her skeletal remains were found in 1986 in rainforest scrub at Possum Brush in the Kiwarrak State Forest, south of Taree. Milat has been considered as a possible suspect because investigators obtained RTA accommodation records that showed he was repairing sections of the Pacific Highway near Taree at that time of Isenhood's disappearance and was staying in a Taree hotel.

Milat was identified as a person of interest in the disappearances of Goodall, Hickie, and Robinson during a 2001 inquest. He had worked as a road worker in the late 1970s and was considered of significant interest in the inquiry, according to state coroner John Abernethy, due to his definite links to the Hunter Region. Milat allegedly claimed to a friend that there were graves and corpse pits scattered throughout the area. In his testimony, he stated that while he had picked up around fifteen hitchhikers, they were not in the Hunter Region. He maintained his innocence, asserting that he had nothing to do with the missing children and could look their families in the eye. During the inquest, he also questioned why a 14-year-old, Amanda Robinson, was allowed to roam at midnight. Despite Milat's presence in the area during the time of the crimes, no case was brought against him due to insufficient evidence. Similar inquiries were conducted in 2005 regarding the disappearance of Briffa, but no charges were filed. The media has speculated about other crimes that may have been committed by Milat:

- On 4 July 1972, Anita Cunningham (19) and Robyn Hoinville-Bartram (18), both graphic design students who shared an apartment, left Melbourne with the intention of hitchhiking to Queensland. Eighty kilometres west of Charters Towers, Hoinville-Bartram's half-nude body was discovered beneath a bridge at Sensible Creek. She had been shot in the head with the same type of .22 calibre rifle that Milat used. Cunningham's remains were never discovered. Although authorities looked into Milat's actions around the time of the disappearances, they never were able to make an official connection.
- On 5 October 1973, Gabrielle Jahnke (18) and Michelle Riley (16) made the decision to hitchhike from Brisbane to the Gold Coast. Jahnke's corpse was discovered at the foot of a steep slope on the Pacific Highway at Ormeau on the northern Gold Coast, a week after they vanished. Ten days later, Riley's body was discovered in isolated bushland off Waterford-Tamborine Road at Logan Village in southern Brisbane. Her dress had been pushed up and she was not wearing underwear. Over her body, branches had been placed. The crime scene resembled Milat's modus operandi.
- Lydia Notz (21), a German national, was last seen at a friend's address in the Brisbane suburb of Chapel Hill, Queensland, on 31 October 1976. She left a note saying she would return in about a week, but has not been seen since. In 2021, criminal psychologist Tim Watson-Munro and forensic anthropologist Xanthé Mallett included Notz as a possible victim of Milat's in the television program Ivan Milat: Backpacker Murderer.
- On 20 July 1977, Narelle Mary Cox (21), went missing on a trip to Noosa on the Sunshine Coast, Queensland, to visit an old school friend. She is believed to have gone missing in the Brunswick Heads area in Northern NSW, where Milat was known to frequent for work. Narelle's sister called the Milat task force in 1994, but he was ultimately ruled out as a suspect due to conflicting dates in his work schedule. However, this conclusion has been met with some criticism since Milat used to get people to sign in for him when he was actually absent from work.
- Barbara Carol Brown (22) an American national, was last seen in New South Wales on 17 May 1978. Barbara set off from the Sydney suburb of Beecroft home of the brother and wife of her Melbourne boyfriend, intending to hitchhike to Queensland and then going across to Perth. She was never heard from again. In 2021, Brown was included as a possible victim of Milat's in the program Ivan Milat: Backpacker Murderer.
- On 25 August 1978, Stephen Lapthorne (20) and Michelle Pope (18) were last seen in a car travelling from Lapthorne's home in West Pymble to Pope's home of Berowra in Sydney. Lapthorne's lime green Bedford has never been located. Although they have not ruled out death by accident, investigators believe they were killed and that their remains were buried in the Ku-ring-gai Chase National Park. Deputy State Coroner Carl Milovanovich conducted an inquiry into the couple's disappearance in August 2005 and certified both of their deaths. Although Milat was identified as the individual who was most likely to have killed the couple, the coroner handed down an open finding as to the date, time and cause of death.
- On 11 January 1979, Alan Martin Fox (22) and his girlfriend Anneke Adriaansen (17) left Berowra Heights in Sydney to go to Kempsey and Byron Bay by hitchhiking. Fox and Adriaansen were last observed on Byron Bay's Main Street in the late afternoon of 12 January. According to police, the couple's disappearance was suspicious. Milat was mentioned as a potential suspect since he could have been on the NSW North Coast at the time.
- On 27 July 1979, around 19.30 pm, Toni Maree Cavanagh (15) and Kay Docherty (16) were last seen at a bus stop heading to a disco in Wollongong. A letter from the pair dated 1 August and bearing a Darlinghurst postmark arrived a week later saying they were in Sydney, but they were never seen or heard from again. Both are believed to have been murdered. Milat was investigated as a potential suspect during an inquest in 2013. However, no detailed evidence was provided to support such an assertion.
- Kim Cherie Teer (17) disappeared in East Melbourne around September 1979 with her black and white Border Collie while she was attempting to travel to Adelaide. She had been travelling across the country and in her final letter to her mother, Kim spoke of her fear of hitchhiking and asked for her birth certificate so she could get her driver's licence. Detectives believe that Kim may have met with foul play while trying to hitchhike.
- On 1 February 1980, Elaine Johnson (17) and Kerry Anne Joel (18) were last seen at Cronulla in Sydney. They are believed to have encountered violence while hitchhiking to Wyong in the Hunter Region on the Central Coast, New South Wales. Milat, who had been employed in the region they are thought to have been travelling to at the time of their disappearance, is the prime suspect.
- On 12 June 1980, aspiring nurses Deborah Balken and Gillian Jamieson (both 20) were last seen conversing with a man wearing a wide-brimmed cowboy hat in a Parramatta tavern in Sydney. Later, Balken contacted her flatmate to say they were taking a ride to a party in Wollongong. Milat, who had been employed in western Sydney in 1980, is known to have been questioned about their disappearances and was mentioned as a person of interest at the women's wrongful death inquiry.
- Joanne Lacey and Lesley David Toshak (both 20) were reported as missing on 20 April 1981 after leaving Sydney to hitchhike to Byron Bay on a surfing trip in Northern NSW. In 2012, a coroner ruled that both had died under suspicious circumstances. Authorities suspect that the double disappearance was related to the prior cases of missing couples who vanished from the area in the late 1970s and early 1980s.
- On 10 March 1991, Carmen Verheyden (22) was last seen hitchhiking on the Hume Highway in Casula, close to Liverpool Sydney, at 12:30 am. After leaving a party, she was observed sitting outside the Crossroads Hotel with the intention of going back to her home in Westmead. She has not been seen since. There is speculation that Milat might have abducted and murdered Verheyden because she vanished from the same location as the backpacker abductions. In November 1993, Task Force Air detectives investigating Milat's crimes looked at the possibility that Verheyden was one of his victims, but were unable to find evidence.
- On 23 November 1992, Melony Merrille Sutton (14) and Chad Everett Sutton (16) were last seen by their mother in the Brisbane suburb of Inala, Queensland, at 8:35 am, when they departed for school on foot. It was subsequently discovered that they had intended to hitchhike to Perth to find their father. It is believed they passed via the Belanglo State Forest. They are still classified as missing.

== Timeline of murders including suspected victims ==
Person	Date of disappearance	Body/remains found	Age	Last seen / disappearance location	Connection to Milat
Keren Rowland	26 February 1971	13 May 1971	20	Canberra, Australian Capital Territory	Identified by Task Force commander Clive Small as having a high possibility of being a Milat victim
Anita Cunningham	4 July 1972	Not found	19	Travelling from Melbourne to Queensland	Investigated as a possible Milat case
Robyn Hoinville-Bartram	4 July 1972	15 November 1972	18	Travelling from Melbourne to Queensland	Investigated as a possible Milat case
Gabrielle Jahnke	5–6 October 1973	13 October 1973	18	Travelling from Brisbane to the Gold Coast, Queensland	Investigated as a possible Milat case
Michelle Riley	5–6 October 1973	23 October 1973	16	Travelling from Brisbane to the Gold Coast, Queensland	Investigated as a possible Milat case
Lydia Notz	31 October 1976	Not found	21	Chapel Hill, Brisbane, Queensland	Proposed as a possible Milat victim
Narelle Mary Cox	20 July 1977	Not found	21	Believed to have disappeared near Brunswick Heads, New South Wales	Investigated as a possible Milat victim; Milat was ruled out at the time
Barbara Carol Brown	17 May 1978	Not found	22	Beecroft, Sydney, New South Wales	Proposed as a possible Milat victim
Stephen Lapthorne	25 August 1978	Not found	20	Travelling from West Pymble to Berowra, Sydney, New South Wales	Milat was identified as the person most likely to have killed the couple, although the coroner returned an open finding
Michelle Pope	25 August 1978	Not found	18	Travelling from West Pymble to Berowra, Sydney, New South Wales	Milat was identified as the person most likely to have killed the couple, although the coroner returned an open finding
Leanne Goodall	30 December 1978	Not found	20	Newcastle, New South Wales	Milat was identified as a person of interest
Alan Martin Fox	12 January 1979	Not found	22	Main Street, Byron Bay, New South Wales	Milat was mentioned as a potential suspect
Anneke Adriaansen	12 January 1979	Not found	17	Main Street, Byron Bay, New South Wales	Milat was mentioned as a potential suspect
Robyn Hickie	7 April 1979	Not found	18	Pacific Highway, Belmont North, New South Wales	Milat was identified as a person of interest
Amanda Robinson	21 April 1979	Not found	14	Lake Road, heading towards Swansea, New South Wales	Milat was identified as a person of interest
Toni Maree Cavanagh	27 July 1979	Not found	15	Wollongong, New South Wales	Milat was investigated as a potential suspect
Kay Docherty	27 July 1979	Not found	16	Wollongong, New South Wales	Milat was investigated as a potential suspect
Kim Cherie Teer	c. September 1979	Not found	17	East Melbourne, Victoria	Investigated as a possible case
Amanda Zolis	12 October 1979	Not found	16	Hamilton / Hamilton South, Newcastle, New South Wales	Her disappearance was investigated in connection with the Hunter Region disappearances
Annette Briffa	10 January 1980	Not found	18	Pacific Highway between Mount Colah and Asquith, New South Wales	Milat was investigated in relation to her disappearance
Elaine Johnson	1 February 1980	Not found	17	Cronulla, Sydney, New South Wales	Milat has been described as the prime suspect
Kerry Anne Joel	1 February 1980	Not found	18	Cronulla, Sydney, New South Wales	Milat has been described as the prime suspect
Deborah Balken	12 June 1980	Not found	20	Parramatta, Sydney, New South Wales; reportedly travelling to Wollongong	Milat was questioned about the disappearance and identified as a person of interest
Gillian Jamieson	12 June 1980	Not found	20	Parramatta, Sydney, New South Wales; reportedly travelling to Wollongong	Milat was questioned about the disappearance and identified as a person of interest
Joanne Lacey	20 April 1981	Not found	20	Sydney, New South Wales; hitchhiking towards Byron Bay	Authorities suspected a possible connection with other unexplained disappearances
Lesley David Toshak	20 April 1981	Not found	20	Sydney, New South Wales; hitchhiking towards Byron Bay	Authorities suspected a possible connection with other unexplained disappearances
Susan Gaye Isenhood	2 October 1985	1986 or 1987	22	Mayfield, Newcastle, New South Wales; attempting to hitchhike to Taree	Milat was considered a possible suspect
Peter Letcher	13 November 1987	21 January 1988	18	Hitchhiking towards Bathurst, New South Wales	Identified by Task Force commander Clive Small as having a high possibility of being a Milat victim
Deborah Everist	30 December 1989	5 October 1993	19	Sydney, New South Wales; travelling towards ConFest and Albury	Victim for whose murder Milat was convicted
James Gibson	30 December 1989	5 October 1993	19	Sydney, New South Wales; travelling towards ConFest and Albury	Victim for whose murder Milat was convicted
Simone Schmidl	20 January 1991	1 November 1993	20	Sydney, New South Wales; hitchhiking towards Melbourne	Victim for whose murder Milat was convicted
Carmen Verheyden	10 March 1991	Not found	22	Crossroads Hotel / Hume Highway, Casula, Sydney, New South Wales	Investigated by Task Force Air as a possible Milat victim
Dianne Pennacchio	6 September 1991	13 November 1991	29	Bungendore, New South Wales; hitchhiking towards Queanbeyan	Identified by Task Force commander Clive Small as having a high possibility of being a Milat victim
Gabor Neugebauer	26 December 1991	4 November 1993	21	Kings Cross, Sydney, New South Wales; travelling towards Adelaide and Darwin	Victim for whose murder Milat was convicted
Anja Habschied	26 December 1991	4 November 1993	20	Kings Cross, Sydney, New South Wales; travelling towards Adelaide and Darwin	Victim for whose murder Milat was convicted
Joanne Walters	18 April 1992	19 September 1992	22	Bulli Pass, near Wollongong, New South Wales	Victim for whose murder Milat was convicted
Caroline Clarke	18 April 1992	19 September 1992	21	Bulli Pass, near Wollongong, New South Wales	Victim for whose murder Milat was convicted
Melony Merrille Sutton	23 November 1992	Not found	14	Inala, Brisbane, Queensland	Investigated as a possible case because the pair may have travelled through the Belanglo State Forest area
Chad Everett Sutton	23 November 1992	Not found	16	Inala, Brisbane, Queensland	Investigated as a possible case because the pair may have travelled through the Belanglo State Forest area

== Personal life ==
Milat, aged 38 at the time, met 16-year-old Karen Duck in 1983, who was pregnant by his cousin. They married in 1984 and had one daughter of their own. However, Duck left Milat in 1987 due to domestic violence; they divorced in October 1989. At trial, she described Milat as "gun crazy", recalling him killing kangaroos on a visit to Belanglo State Forest. Milat's great-nephew, Matthew Milat, and his friend Cohen Klein (both aged 19 at the time of their sentencing) were sentenced in 2012 to 43 years and 32 years in prison, respectively, for murdering David Auchterlonie on his 17th birthday in the Belanglo State Forest in November 2010. Matthew struck Auchterlonie with the double-headed axe as Klein audio-recorded the attack with a mobile phone. On 18 July 2005, John Marsden, Milat's former lawyer, made a deathbed statement in which he claimed that Milat had been assisted by his sister, Shirley Soire (1946–2003), in the killings of the two British backpackers.

In May 2015, Milat's brother Boris told Steve Aperen, a former homicide detective, that Milat had admitted responsibility for accidentally shooting taxi driver Neville Knight with a shotgun during an attempted robbery on 6 March 1962, when Milat was aged 17. Knight was left paralysed from the waist down. Milat was never caught and an innocent man, Allan Dillon, was subsequently convicted and served five years in prison for the crime. After conducting polygraph tests with Boris and Dillon, Aperen became convinced that Milat shot Knight. Authorities never charged Milat with the crime, although they noted similarities with the way Milat paralysed many of his victims before they were murdered. Similarly, superintendent Clive Small, who led the investigation into the backpacker murders, also believed that Milat was responsible for the shooting of Knight.

== In popular culture ==
Milat has been the subject of several books. A book by Milat's nephew, Alistair Shipsey, The Milat Letters (ISBN 1785547844), was released in 2016. In December 2018, Australian author Amanda Howard was writing a book on his crimes, based on her correspondence with Milat. A miniseries on the Seven Network, Catching Milat, screened in 2015 and focused on the members of Task Force Air who tracked Milat. It was loosely based on the book Sins of the Brother by Mark Whittaker and Les Kennedy. Milat's murders inspired the Wolf Creek films. In 2021, a four-part documentary series entitled Ivan Milat: Backpacker Murderer was released which examined the possibility that Milat had twenty additional victims.

== See also ==
- List of serial killers by number of victims
