= Cooke Plains, South Australia =

Cooke Plains
- Town
- Coordinates: 35.378°S 139.561°E
- Country: Australia
- State: South Australia
- LGA: Coorong District Council
- Location: 18 km (11 mi) SE of Tailem Bend

Government
  - State electorate: Hammond
  - Federal division: Barker
- Elevation: 6 m (20 ft)

Population
  - Total: 69 (SAL 2016)
- Postcode: 5261
Localities around Cooke Plains
| Tailem Bend | Elwomple | Moorlands |
| Wellington East | Cooke Plains |
| Ashville | Malinong | Coomandook |

Cooke Plains is a settlement in South Australia. It is adjacent to the Dukes Highway on the Adelaide–Melbourne railway about halfway between Tailem Bend and Coomandook, however trains no longer stop there. The town has several businesses and a Soldier's Memorial Hall (emblazoned with the possessive "Cooke's Plains" in the stonework).

Cooke Plains township was originally a private subdivision, named after the pastoralists James and Archie Cooke. Cooke Plains boundaries now also include the former government town of Bedford which was surveyed in August 1871 and declared ceased to exist on 28 April 1960.

== History ==
A Christian Chapel opened in Cooke Plains around 1869

A social event was held in the locality on October 27, 1911

Cooke Plains used to have an active tennis club, with match records showing a loss in 1923 against Tailem Bend. Despite this, the tennis court is currently disused and appears to be used for storing pallets and miscellaneous agricultural equipment.

== Geography ==
Cooke Plains sits within the Murray Basin sedimentary groundwater system, consisting of thick Cainozoic limestones.

In 1979, Researchers at Flinders University found evidence that around 6,500-7,000 years ago, sea levels were slightly higher than today (by about 1 meter) after the last Ice age which caused Lake Alexandrina to grow bigger and flood the area, due to its low elevation.

== Economy ==
Cooke Plains is home to Cooke Plains Gypsum, which, as the name suggests, supplies Gypsum. The company owns a fleet including some Mack Trucks.
