= Belanglo State Forest =

State forest in New South Wales, Australia

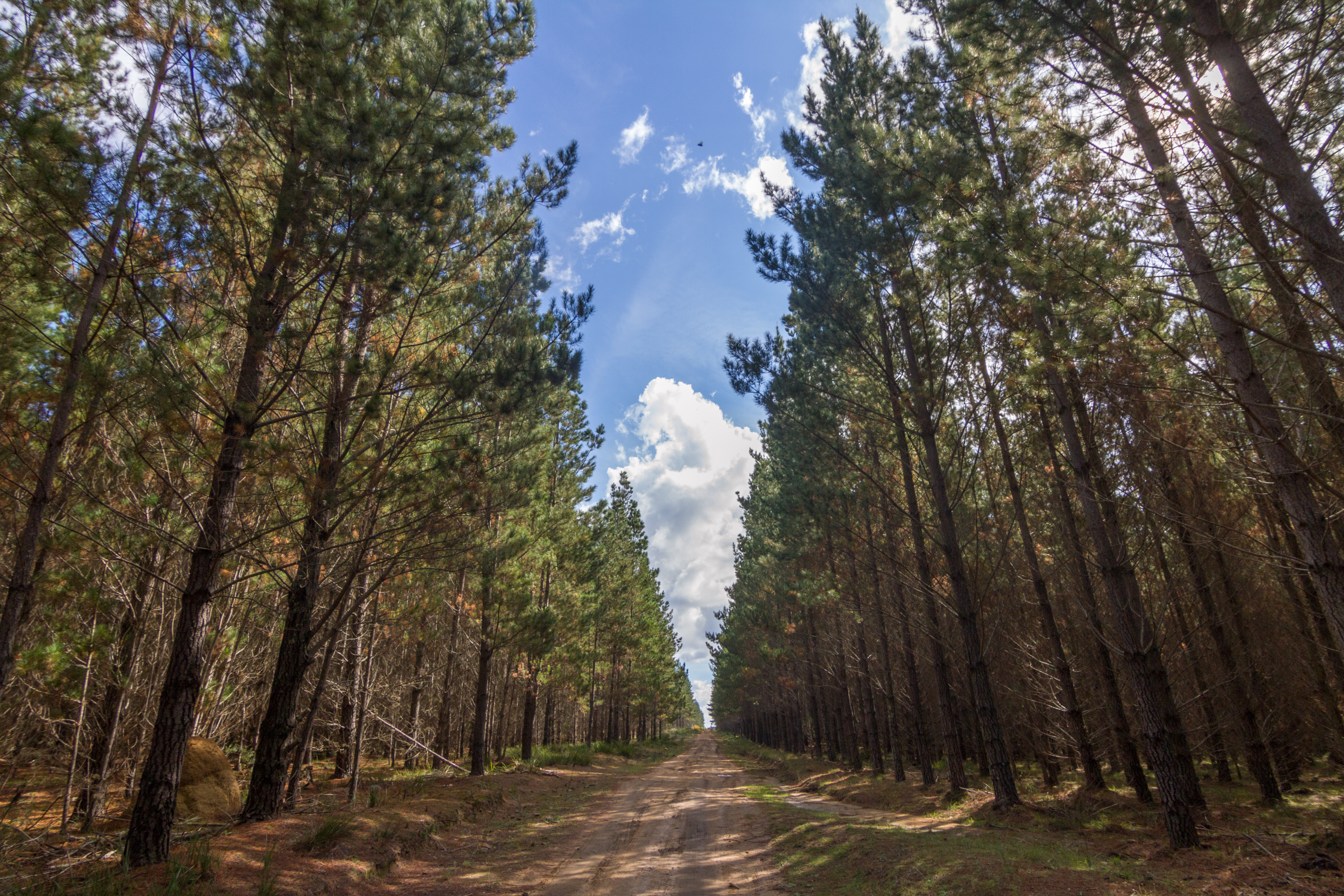
- Interactive map of Belanglo State Forest

Geography
- Location: Southern Highlands, New South Wales, Australia
- Coordinates: 34°31′52″S 150°15′36″E
- Area: 38 km^{2} (15 sq mi)

Administration
- Established: 1919
- Authority: Forestry Corporation of NSW

Ecology
- Dominant tree species: Pine

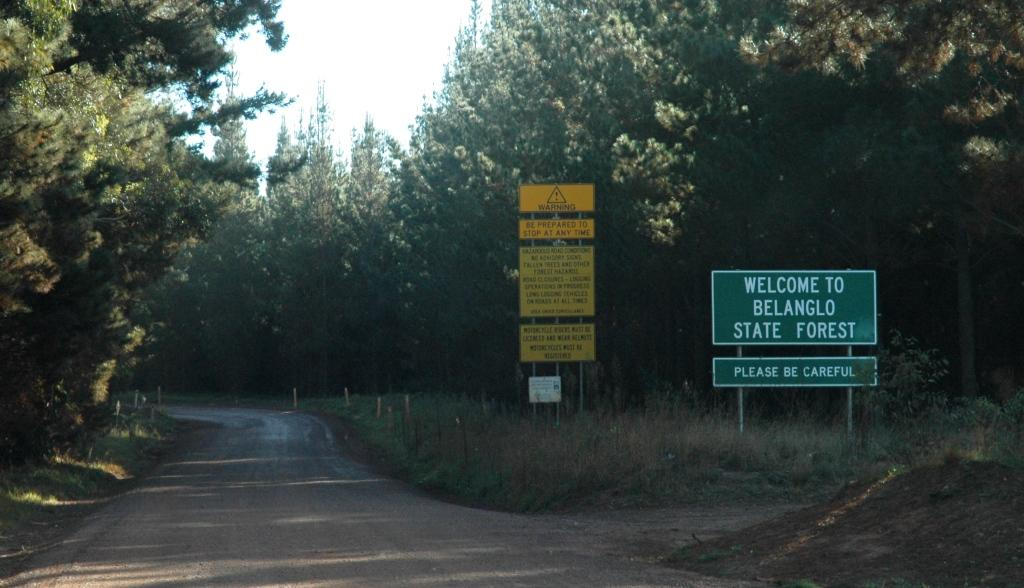
This sign at the entrance of the forest advises visitors to "please be careful".

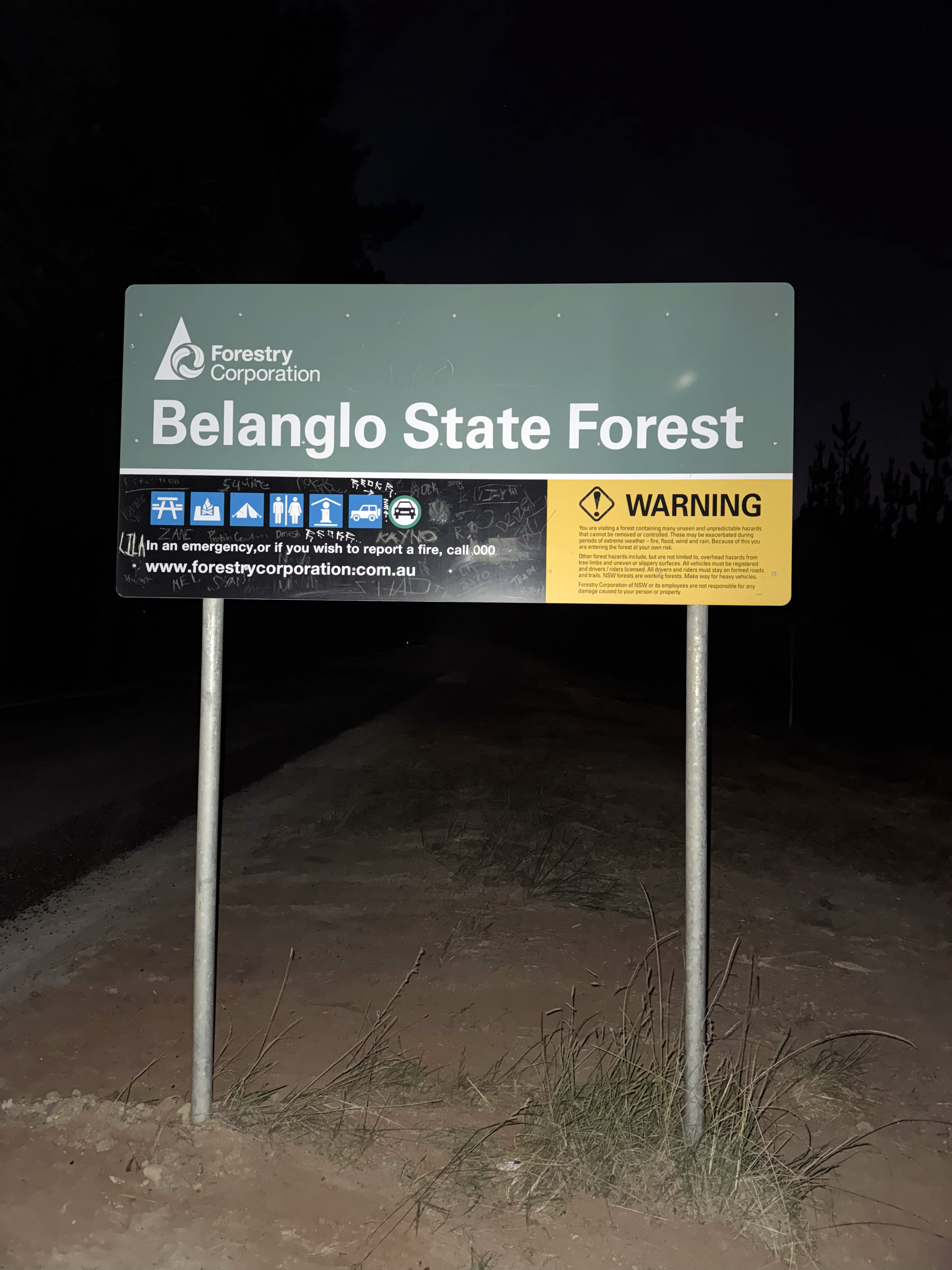
Sign at the entrance to the forest, April 2025.

Belanglo State Forest is a planted forest, of mainly pine but some native forestry around the edges, open to the public, in the Australian state of New South Wales; its total area is about 3,800 ha (9,400 acres). The Belanglo State Forest is located south of Berrima in the Southern Highlands, three kilometres west of the Hume Highway between Sydney and Canberra. The forest is owned by the New South Wales Government and contains some of the earliest pine plantings in the state. The first radiata pines were planted in this area in 1919.

== Reputation ==
Despite being an area of outstanding natural beauty, Belanglo State Forest has a sinister reputation, and place in Australian folklore, due to the forest's connection to multiple murders.

=== Ivan Milat murders ===
In 1992 and 1993, seven skeletons were found in the forest, in what was described by media as the backpacker murders and was considered to be the work of a serial killer. Eventually, Ivan Milat was convicted of the murders in 1996 and sentenced to life imprisonment.

=== Murder of David Auchterlonie ===
On 22 November 2010, three teenagers (including one related to Milat) were arrested on suspicion of connection with the discovery of a murdered male in the forest, following a tip-off. David Auchterlonie was celebrating his 17th birthday on 20 November; Matthew Milat, 17, and Cohen Klein, 18 had planned for over a week to lure Auchterlonie to his death. A third person, Chase Day, 18, whose charges were later withdrawn by the DPP, went to police on 21 November to report the murder. Milat and Klein were found guilty of murder and sentenced to 43 and 32 years respectively.

=== Murder of Karlie Pearce-Stevenson ===
On 29 August 2010, trail bike riders discovered a human skeleton in the forest. Media reports at first linked the killing to Milat, but later forensic work disproved this theory as the remains were left there after he was sent to prison. On 21 October 2015, the bones were identified as the body of Karlie Pearce-Stevenson, aged 22, from Alice Springs, Northern Territory. The body of Pearce-Stevenson's daughter, Khandalyce Pearce, aged 2, was found in a suitcase near Wynarka, South Australia, on 14 July 2015.

=== Park usage ===
Visitors to the park are warned by a sign to 'please be careful', as they enter the territory. This sign was notorious for being stolen, eventually being replaced with a standard Forestry Corporation sign. Detectives who worked on the Milat murders have said there is 'pure evil' in Belanglo State Forest.

According to the Forestry Corporation of NSW, the state-owned enterprise which manages the forest, Belanglo State Forest is a popular tourist recreation destination despite its sinister reputation.
