= Mark Tedeschi =

Australian barrister, law professor, photographer and author

Mark Tedeschi AM KC
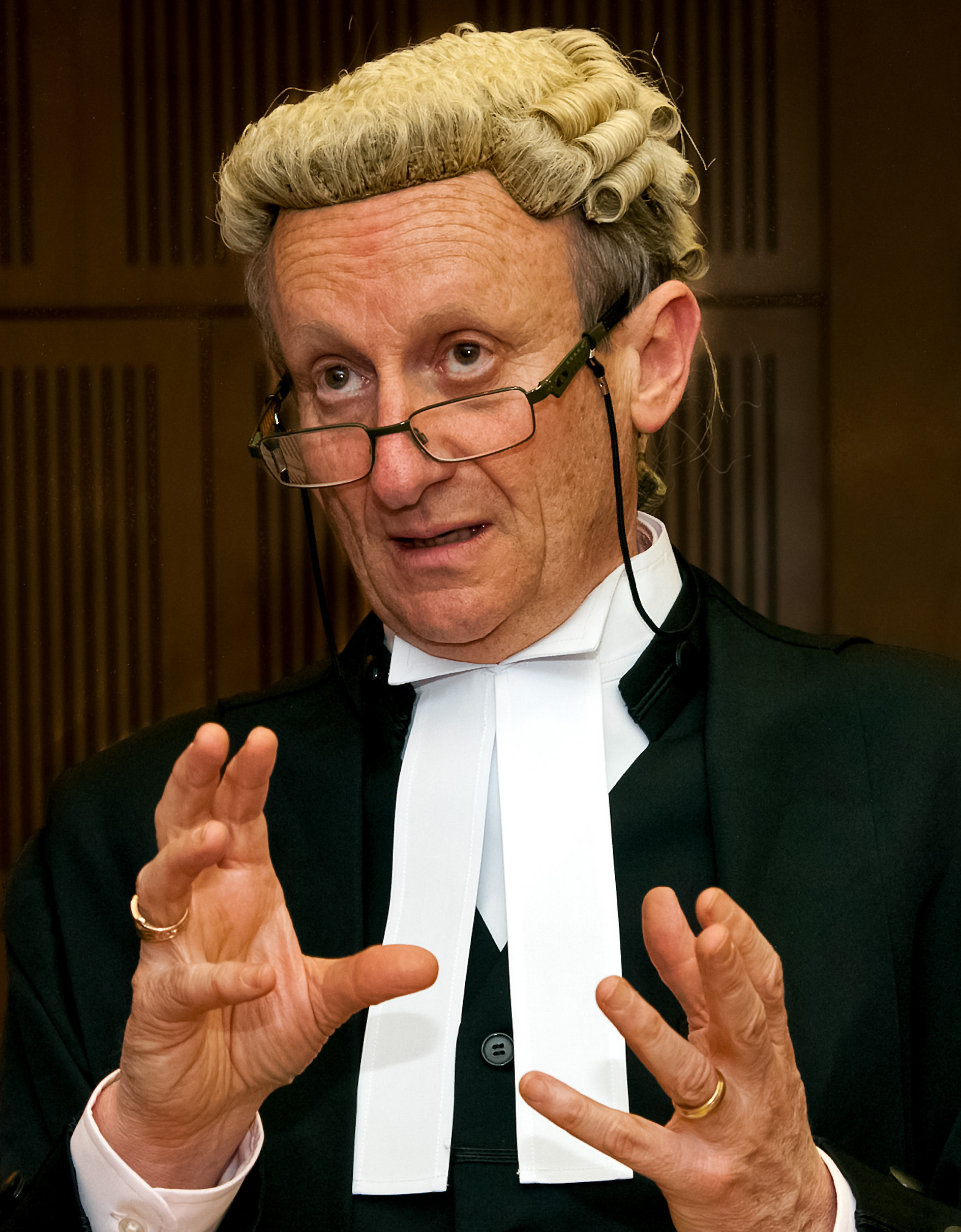
- Born: 1952 (age 73–74); Sydney, Australia
- Occupations: Barrister, former Senior Crown prosecutor Photographer; Academic; Author
- Organization(s): Wardell Chambers, Sydney
- Spouse(s): Vivienne Tedeschi, née Gershwin
- Children: 3 including Simon Tedeschi
- Website: marktedeschi.com

Mark Tedeschi, AM, KC (born 1952) is an Australian barrister, law professor, photographer and author. He is in private practice at Wardell Chambers in Sydney. He was formerly the Senior Crown prosecutor for New South Wales and the Head of Chambers of the Crown prosecutors. He was the founder and president of the Australian Association of Crown Prosecutors and is a visiting professor at the University of Wollongong. As a prosecutor, Tedeschi was best known for the prosecution of numerous high-profile cases in Australia, including the backpacker murders committed by Ivan Milat in the 1990s; several prosecutions he secured have been overturned and labelled miscarriages of justice. He has won numerous awards for his photography and has been featured in galleries throughout the world, including in the State Library of New South Wales, the New South Wales Art Gallery, the Center for Fine Art Photography in Colorado, and the National Library in Canberra.

== Early life and education ==
Tedeschi earned a Bachelor of Laws degree from the University of Sydney in 1974 and was then admitted as a solicitor in New South Wales. He later received a Master of Arts in Business Law, specialising in International Banking, Trade and Taxation Law from the London Metropolitan University (then the City of London Polytechnic), where he also served as a part-time Lecturer in Law.

== Professional career ==
=== Legal career ===
Tedeschi became a barrister in 1977. He was a defence barrister during the (so called) "Greek Conspiracy Case" in 1979–81 in which over 100 people, the majority of whom were of Greek origin, were arrested and charged with defrauding Social Security. He was appointed a Crown Prosecutor in 1983, a Queen's Counsel in 1988, a Deputy Senior Crown Prosecutor in 1990, and the Senior Crown Prosecutor in 1997. He resigned as a Crown Prosecutor in February 2018, making him the longest serving Crown Prosecutor and Senior Crown Prosecutor in the State's history.

During his career as a prosecutor, he worked on numerous high-profile cases in New South Wales. Tedeschi prosecuted the backpacker murders committed by Ivan Milat in the 1990s. Milat was found guilty of all murders on 27 July 1996. He appealed the conviction, but it was upheld. Tedeschi successfully prosecuted Chew Seng Liew and Choon Tee Lim for the 1991 shooting death of prominent Australian heart surgeon Victor Chang, and Phuong Ngo for the 1994 assassination of Member of parliament John Newman.

In 2001, he prosecuted family-murderer Sef Gonzales. Tedeschi was the lead prosecutor in a trial arising out of the infamous 2000 Fijian coup d'état led by George Speight. In 2004, he prosecuted then vice-president Jope Seniloli for falsely swearing in of ministers. He also won convictions against Deputy Speaker of the House of Representatives Rakuita Vakalalabure, as well as Ratu Viliame Volavola, PeceliRinakama, and Viliame Savu for the similar offences. All were sentenced to various prison terms.

In 2007, Tedeschi was the Counsel Assisting the Coroner during the Inquest into the deaths of five Australian journalists at Balibo in East Timor. Dubbed the Balibo Five, all were killed on 16 October 1975 during the Indonesian incursions prior to the main Indonesian invasion of East Timor. The deaths were found to have been deliberate at the Inquest by an Australian coroner, who ruled that they were killed by Indonesian special forces soldiers.

Other cases prosecuted by Tedeschi include:

- Tim Anderson for the Sydney Hilton Hotel bombing. Anderson's conviction was later overturned, with the New South Wales Court of Criminal Appeal criticising Tedeschi's prosecution.
- Arthur "Neddy" Smith
- Kathleen Folbigg. Folbigg's convictions were later overturned and she received a full pardon.
- Gordon Wood. Wood's conviction was later overturned.
- Keli Lane
- Robert Xie

=== Controversies as a prosecutor ===
In 1991, the New South Wales Court of Criminal Appeal made criticism of Tedeschi in acquitting Tim Anderson of charges related to the 1978 Hilton Hotel bombing. Chief Justice Murray Gleeson said, in a unanimous judgement: "The trial of the appellant miscarried principally because of an error which resulted in large part from the failure of the prosecuting authorities adequately to check aspects of the Jayewardene theory. This was compounded by what I regard as an inappropriate and unfair attempt by the Crown to persuade the jury to draw inferences of fact, and accept argumentative suggestions, that were not properly open on the evidence. I do not consider that in those circumstances the Crown should be given a further opportunity to patch up its case against the appellant. It has already made one attempt too many to do that, and I believe that, if that attempt had never been made, there is a strong likelihood that the appellant would have been acquitted." Several legal and academic sources cite Anderson's conviction as a miscarriage of justice. The Legal Aid Commission of NSW, acting for Anderson, laid almost 50 complaints against Tedeschi to the NSW Bar Council, though Anderson states "None of it came to anything."

Tedeschi was also criticised as a prosecutor in 2012 by the NSW Court of Criminal Appeal in the Gordon Wood trial. In acquitting Gordon Wood over the alleged murder of Caroline Byrne, the appeal judges found he relied on fiction and dangerous reasoning in the Wood case. Chief Judge Peter McLellan made numerous critical references to Tedeschi's presentation of evidence, concluding: "The difficulties which the prosecutor's conduct created are so significant that I am satisfied it caused the trial to miscarry occasioning a miscarriage of justice. The fundamental problem with the course taken by the prosecutor was that both generally and with respect to particular questions the prosecutor reversed the onus of proof." Subsequently, Wood lodged complaints against Tedeschi to the New South Wales Bar Association, which were all dismissed.

In December 2017, Tedeschi wrote two email messages to state prosecutors, arguing that some of his colleagues were making inappropriate concessions to the defence. He said that the key role of a Crown prosecutor was "to act as a contradictor". The Bar Council responded that Tedeschi's messages had presented a "fundamental misunderstanding of the independent role of Crown prosecutors, as mere agents, rather than independent counsel". A DPP media release agreed with the main points of the Bar Council's statement. Tedeschi resigned as Senior Crown Prosecutor in February 2018, having announced his resignation in October 2017.

=== Academic career ===
From 1974 to 1975, Tedeschi served as a lecturer in law at the London Metropolitan University. At that time, it was known as the City of London Polytechnic. He was a part-time lecturer while earning his master's degree. In 1975 he was appointed as a lecturer in law at the Kuring-Gai College of Advanced Education (subsequently part of the University of Technology Sydney).

In 2005, he was appointed as a Visiting Professorial Fellow at the University of Wollongong.

=== Photography ===
Tedeschi is a well-known photographer. He has had fifteen solo exhibitions and participated in over twenty group exhibitions in Australia, Italy, France, and the United States. His images are included in the State Library of New South Wales, the Art Gallery of New South Wales, the National Library of Australia in Canberra, the Museum of Sydney, the Justice and Police Museum, the State Library of New South Wales (which has over 200 of his images), the Centre for Fine Art Photography in Colorado USA, and many private collections.

Tedeschi has been a judge of photographic competitions including the New South Wales Parliamentary Photography Prize. He frequently lectures on photography to camera clubs, the Art Gallery Society, and community groups. Tedeschi is a member of the board of directors of the National Art School in Sydney and a Trustee of Sydney Grammar School. He is a former artist-in-residence at Sydney Grammar School.

=== Bibliography ===
Tedeschi is the author of several books, including one on international business law which he co-authored in 1980: Law of International Business in Australia with Dr. P.J. O'Keefe. A book of his photographs was published by Beagle Press in 2012 entitled Shooting Around Corners, which featured over twenty-five years of his photography.

Tedeschi is the author of four true-crime books, all published by published by Simon & Schuster Australia. The first was Eugenia, published in 2012, which tells the story of Eugene Falleni. Kidnapped: the Crime that shocked a Nation, published in 2015, tells the story of the kidnapping and murder of 8-year-old Graeme Thorne in 1960. Murder at Myall Creek: The Trial that defined a Nation, published in 2016, tells the story of the trial of 10 European men and one African man who were charged with the murder of 28 Aboriginal Australians in 1838, and the prosecutor, John Hubert Plunkett who conducted their trial. Missing, Presumed Dead, published in 2022, details the murders committed by Bruce Burell.

== Awards and recognitions ==
Tedeschi has been a four time finalist in the National Photographic Portrait Prize at the National Portrait Gallery in Canberra as well as the Contemporary Photographic Prize, the "Head On" Photographic Portrait Prize at the Australian Centre for Photography, and the Photographic Portrait Prize at the National Portrait Gallery in London.

In 2009 Tedeschi was made a Cavaliere Ordine al Merito della Repubblica Italiana or Knight of the Order of Merit of the Italian Republic. In 2013 he was announced a Member of the Order of Australia (AM), for significant service to the law as a prosecutor, and to photography.
