= George Jaensch =

Australian telegraph operator

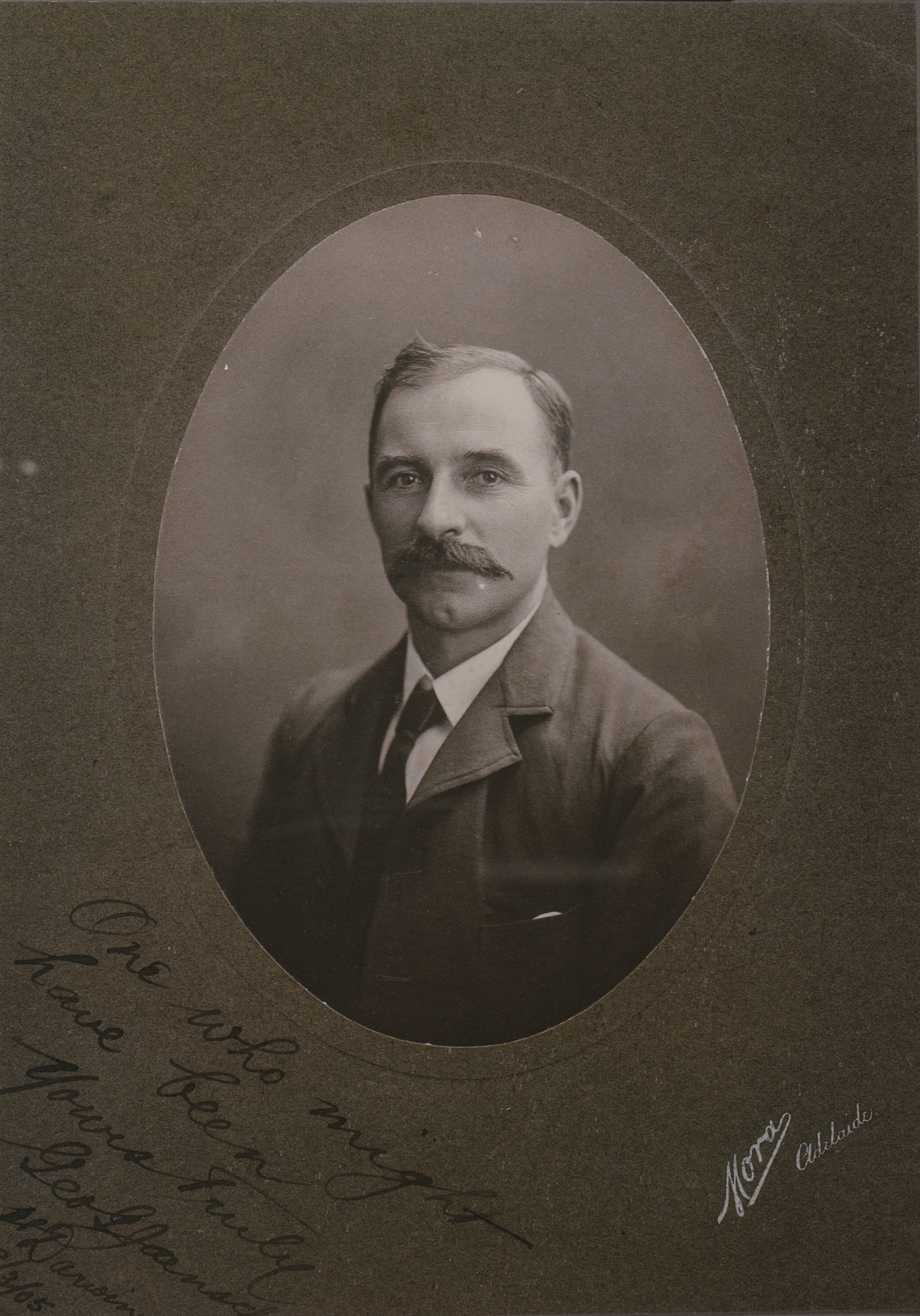
George Jaensch in 1905

George Gottlieb Jaensch (14 December 1872 – 7 November 1958) was an operator on the Australian Overland Telegraph Line and post master in the Northern Territory of Australia from 1895 to 1910.

Later in life he was a farmer and grazier in South Australia's Tailem Bend region.

His father's name is Friedrick Wilhelm Jaensch (1846-1936) and mother's name is Augustine Fredericka Maria Gehrike (1847-1937)

== Collections ==
A collection of images taken by Jaensch and his wife Irene are available at Library & Archives NT:

The George and Irene Jaensch collection
