= Backpacker murders =

Series of murders in New South Wales, Australia

- Location: Belanglo State Forest, New South Wales, Australia
- Date: December 1989 – November 1993
- Target: Backpacker tourists
- Attack type: Serial killings
- Deaths: 7
- Perpetrator: Ivan Milat
- Convictions: Murder (7 counts), attempted murder, false imprisonment, and robbery
- Sentence: 7 life sentences plus 18 years

The backpacker murders were a spate of serial killings that took place in New South Wales, Australia, between 1989 and 1993, committed by Ivan Milat. The bodies of seven missing young people aged 19 to 22 were discovered partially buried in the Belanglo State Forest, 15 km (9.3 mi) south-west of the New South Wales town of Berrima. Five of the victims were foreign backpackers (three German, two British) and two were Australians from Melbourne. Milat, then 51 years old, was convicted of the murders on 27 July 1996 and was sentenced to seven consecutive life sentences, as well as 18 years without parole. He died in prison on 27 October 2019, having never confessed to the murders for which he was convicted.

== Murders ==
=== Background ===
Up until the mid-1990s, hitchhiking in Australia was viewed as an adventurous and inexpensive, if not completely safe, means of travel. However, unsolved Australian missing-person cases such as that of Trudie Adams (1978), Tony Jones (1982), Naoko Onda (1987) and Anna Rosa Liva (1991) led those who still hitchhiked to begin to travel in pairs for safety.

In the late 1980s and early 1990s, several backpackers disappeared. One case involved a young Victorian couple from Frankston, Deborah Everist (19) and James Gibson (19), who had been missing since leaving Sydney for ConFest, near Albury, on 30 December 1989. Another related to Simone Schmidl (21), from Germany, who had been missing since leaving Sydney for Melbourne on 20 January 1991. Similarly, a German couple, Gabor Neugebauer (21) and Anja Habschied (20), had disappeared after leaving a Kings Cross hostel for Mildura on 26 December 1991. Another involved missing British backpackers Caroline Clarke (21) and Joanne Walters (22), who were last seen in Kings Cross on 18 April 1992.

=== First and second victims ===
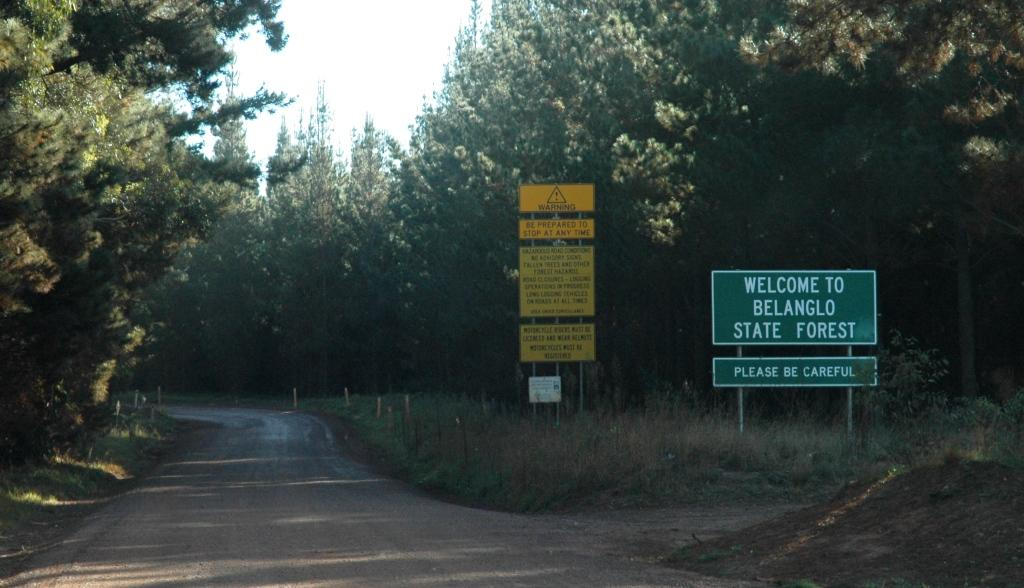
A sign at the entrance to the Belanglo State Forest in New South Wales

On 19 September 1992, two runners discovered a concealed corpse while orienteering in Belanglo. The following morning, police discovered a second body 30 m (100 ft) from the first. Police quickly confirmed, via dental records, that the bodies were those of Clarke and Walters. Walters had been stabbed 15 times; four times in the chest, once in the neck, and nine times in the back which would have paralysed her. Clarke had been shot 10 times in the head at the burial site, and police believe she had been used as target practice. After a thorough search of the forest, investigators ruled out the possibility of further discoveries within Belanglo State Forest.

=== Third and fourth victims ===
In October 1993, a local potter, Bruce Pryor, discovered bones in a particularly remote section of the forest. He returned with police to the scene where two bodies were quickly discovered and later identified as Gibson and Everist. Pryor had searched the area by himself for nine months before discovering the remains, and was initially treated as a suspect himself, developing post-traumatic stress disorder from his encounters with the detectives. Gibson's skeleton, found in a foetal position, showed eight stab wounds. A large knife had cut through his upper spine causing paralysis, and stab wounds to his back and chest would have punctured his heart and lungs. Everist had been savagely beaten; her skull was fractured in two places, her jaw was broken and there were knife marks on her forehead. She had been stabbed once in the back. The presence of Gibson's body in Belanglo puzzled investigators as his camera had previously been discovered on 31 December 1989, and his backpack later on 13 March 1990, by the side of the road at Galston Gorge, in the northern Sydney suburbs, over 120 km (75 mi) to the north.

=== Fifth, sixth and seventh victims ===
On 1 November 1993, a skeleton was found in a clearing along a fire trail in the forest during a police sweep. It was later identified as that of Schmidl, and bore at least eight stab wounds: two had severed her spine and others would have punctured her heart and lungs. Clothing found at the scene was not Schmidl's, but matched that of another missing backpacker, Habschied. The bodies of Habschied and Neugebauer were then found on a nearby fire trail, on 4 November 1993, in shallow graves 50 m (160 ft) apart. Habschied had been decapitated, and despite an extensive search, her skull was never found. Neugebauer had been shot in the head six times. There was evidence that some of the victims did not die instantly from their injuries.

=== Search for the serial killer ===
In response to the finds, on 14 October 1993, Task Force Air, containing more than 20 detectives and analysts, was set up by the NSW Police. On 5 November 1993, the NSW government increased the reward in relation to the Belanglo serial killings to $500,000. Public warnings were also given, particularly aimed at international backpackers, to avoid hitchhiking along the Hume Highway. After developing their profile of the killer, the police faced an enormous volume of data from numerous sources. Investigators applied link analysis technology to Roads & Traffic Authority vehicle records, gym memberships, gun licensing, and internal police records. As a result, the list of suspects was progressively narrowed to a short list of 230, then to an even shorter list of 32.

There were similar aspects to all the murders. Each of the bodies had been dumped in remote bush-land and covered by a pyramid of sticks and ferns. Forensic study determined that each had suffered multiple stab wounds to the torso, and many showed signs of sexual assault. The killer, probably a local with a 4WD, had evidently restrained and spent considerable time with the victims both during and after the murders, as campsites were discovered close to the location of each body. Matching .22 bullets, shell casings, and cartridge boxes from two weapons also linked the crime scenes. Speculation arose that the crimes were the work of several killers, given that most of the victims had been attacked while as pairs, had been killed in different ways, and were buried separately.

On 13 November 1993, police received a call from Paul Onions (24) in the UK. On 25 January 1990, Onions had been backpacking in Australia and, while hitchhiking from Liverpool station towards Mildura, had accepted a ride south out of Casula from a man known only as "Bill". South of the town of Mittagong, and less than 1 km (0.62 mi) from Belanglo State Forest, Bill stopped and pulled out a revolver and some ropes stating it was a robbery, at which point Onions managed to flee while Bill pursued and shot at him. Onions flagged down Joanne Berry, a passing motorist, and together they sped off and described the assailant and his vehicle to the Bowral police. On 13 April 1994, detectives re-found the note regarding Onions' call and sought the original report from Bowral police, but it was missing. Fortunately, a constable had recorded details in her notebook. Onions' statement was corroborated by Berry, who had also contacted the investigation team, along with the girlfriend of a man who worked with Ivan Milat, who thought he should be questioned over the case.

== Arrest and trial ==
On 26 February 1994, police surveillance of the Milat house at Cinnabar Street, Eagle Vale commenced. Police learnt that Milat had recently sold his silver Nissan Patrol four-wheel drive shortly after the discovery of the bodies of Clarke and Walters. Police also confirmed that Milat had not been working on any of the days of the attacks and acquaintances also told police about Milat's obsession with weapons. Milat's brother, Bill, who often had his identity used by his brother for work or vehicle registrations, was questioned by investigators. When the connection between the Belanglo murders and Onions' experience was made, Onions flew to Australia to help with the investigation. On 5 May 1994, Onions positively identified Milat as the man who had picked him up and attempted to murder him.

Milat was arrested at his home on 22 May 1994 on robbery and weapon charges related to the Onions attack after 50 police officers surrounded the premises, including heavily armed officers from the Tactical Operations Unit. The search of Milat's home revealed various weapons, including a .22-calibre Anschütz Model 1441/42 rifle and parts of a .22 calibre Ruger 10/22 rifle that matched the type used in the murders, a Browning pistol, and a Bowie knife. Also uncovered was foreign currency, clothing, a tent, sleeping bags, camping equipment and cameras belonging to several of his victims. Homes belonging to his mother and five of his brothers were also searched at the same time by over 300 police, uncovering a total of 24 weapons, 250 kg of ammunition, and several more items belonging to the victims.

Milat appeared in court on 23 May, but he did not enter a plea. On 31 May, Milat was also charged with the seven backpacker murders. On 28 June, Milat sacked his defence lawyer, John Marsden, and sought legal aid to pay for his defence. Meanwhile, brothers Richard and Walter were tried in relation to weapons, drugs and stolen items found on their properties. A committal hearing for Milat regarding the murders began on 24 October and lasted until 12 December, during which over 200 witnesses appeared. Based on the evidence, at the beginning of February 1995, Milat was remanded in custody until June that same year.

On 26 March 1996, the trial opened at the NSW Supreme Court and was prosecuted by Mark Tedeschi. His defence argued that, in spite of the evidence, there was no non-circumstantial proof Milat was guilty and attempted to shift the blame to other members of his family, particularly Richard. 145 witnesses took the stand, including members of the Milat family who endeavoured to provide alibis, and, on 18 June, Milat himself. On 27 July 1996, after 18 weeks of testimony, a jury found Milat guilty of the murders. He was given a life sentence on each count without the possibility of parole. He was also convicted of the attempted murder, false imprisonment and robbery of Onions, for which he received six years' jail each.

== Other developments ==
Police maintain that Milat could have been involved in more attacks or murders than the seven for which he was convicted. Based on MO similarities, examples include Keren Rowland (20, disappeared 26 February 1971, found in the Fairbairn Pine Plantation in May 1971), Peter Letcher (18, missing November 1987, found in the Jenolan State Forest in 1988), and Dianne Pennacchio (29, disappeared 6 September 1991, found in the Tallaganda State Forest in November 1991). Further, given the possibility of an accomplice, the murder cases were kept open. On 18 July 2005, Milat's former lawyer, Marsden, made a deathbed statement in which he claimed that Milat had been assisted by his sister, Shirley Soire (1946–2003), in the killings of the two British backpackers.

In 2001, Milat was ordered to give evidence at an inquest into the disappearances in the Newcastle area of three other female backpackers (Leanne Goodall, 20, disappeared 30 December 1978; Robyn Hickie, 18, disappeared 7 April 1979; Amanda Robinson, 14, disappeared 21 April 1979). A related cold case is that of Gordana Kotevski (16) who disappeared in 1994. Although Milat was working in the area at the time of the crimes, no case has been brought against him due to a lack of evidence. Similar inquiries were launched in 2003, in relation to the disappearance of two nurses and again in 2005, relating to the disappearance of hitchhiker Annette Briffa, but no charges were laid. In 2010, in a media interview, Onions described how he accepted, but did not use, a $200,000 reward granted for his part in the conviction of Milat.

== Media ==
The case has been extensively covered in the media in Australia and gained notoriety around the world. On 8 November 2004, Milat gave a televised interview on Australian Story, in which he denied that any of his family had been implicated in the seven murders. In March 2017, the case was covered by Australian crime podcasts Felon True Crime, and in March 2019, Casefile True Crime Podcast began airing a five-part series on the Belanglo crimes. On the day Milat died in 2019, The Daily Telegraph released a 4-part podcast called Monster Trial which re-enacted the 1996 trial of Milat.

== In popular culture ==
The 2005 Australian film Wolf Creek is based on the backpacker murders of two British women.

== See also ==
- Murder of Peter Falconio, British backpacker murdered in the Northern Territory in 2001.
