= Naturi, South Australia =

Coordinates: 35°11′46″S 139°35′11″E

Naturi is a locality in the south-east of the Australian state of South Australia, in the Murraylands region. It is located on the Karoonda Highway. Between 1913 and 1996 it was the locus of a siding on the Barmera railway line, which gave its name – derived from the Aboriginal word for "sandy soil" – to the township. In the 2021 census, Naturi had a population of 25.
