= List of massacres in Australia =

This is a list of massacres and mass murders that have occurred in Australia and its predecessor colonies (some historical numbers may be approximate). Many of the massacres not listed here may instead be found in the list of massacres of Indigenous Australians. There is no uniform, global standard for what constitutes a mass murder. For the purposes of this list, the Australian Institute of Criminology definition of mass murder as having a "threshold of four or more fatalities" is used.

== Massacres and mass murders ==
Incident	Date	Location	Deaths	Injuries	Notes
Batavia massacre	1629	Houtman Abrolhos, Western Australia	110+	unknown	Massacre of survivors after the sinking of Dutch merchant ship Batavia following a mutiny.
Shipwreck survivors of the Maria massacred	1840	Coorong, South Australia	25	0	Ship travelling from Port Adelaide to Hobart was shipwrecked on the SE coast of South Australia, with all surviving the wreck. The survivors were being guided to safety by the local Narrindjeri people, but were massacred by them.
Cullin-la-ringo massacre	17 Oct 1861	Central Queensland	19	0	Massacre of newly arrived white settlers by Indigenous Australians.
Response to the Cullin-la-ringo massacre	17 Oct 1861	Central Queensland	60-70~	unknown	In response to the Cullin-la-ringo massacre, "sixty or seventy" Aboriginals were massacred by a vigilante party of eleven heavily armed white settlers accompanied by two Aboriginal trackers.
Cavanagh murders	11 Oct 1896	Peterborough, South Australia	6 (plus culprit)	0	Joseph Thyer, a sheep farmer, murdered his wife and five children before hanging himself.
Glover family murders	1 Mar 1898	Triabunna, Tasmania	6 (plus perpetrator)	0	A mother murdered her six children and then committed suicide.
Breelong murders	Jul 1900	Breelong, New South Wales	9 (plus perpetrator)	0	Jimmy Governor and Jack Underwood murdered four members of the Mawbrey family and a school-teacher at Breelong near Gilgandra. Underwood was captured soon afterwards; Governor and his brother Joe, who was present during the murders, escaped. During the period they were at large, ranging over a large area of north-central New South Wales, the brothers committed further murders and multiple robberies.
Bradshaw massacre	26 Nov 1905 (approx)	Victoria River, Northern Territory	7	0	Four white men and three Aboriginal boys massacred with tomahawks by Aboriginal prisoners being transported by boat to Palmerston to stand trial for the earlier murder of two white men. One Aboriginal boy survived and reported the incident.
Ching family murders	16 Nov 1911	Alligator Creek, Mackay, Queensland	6	0	George David Silva murdered six members of the Ching family by shooting and bashing. Silva was hanged at Boggo Road Gaol in Brisbane on 10 June 1912.
Battle of Broken Hill	1 Jan 1915	Broken Hill, New South Wales	4 (plus 2 perpetrators)	7	Spree shooting by two Ghans gunmen
Botanic Gardens massacre	23 Jan 1924	Melbourne	5 (plus perpetrator)	1	Mass shooting; perpetrator committed suicide.
Murder of the Archur family	26 Feb 1929	Devonport, Tasmania	6 (plus perpetrator)	0	Andrew Thomas Edgar Archur murdered his five children and his wife and then set fire to their house. He killed himself after the attack.
Murder of the Davies family	21 Aug 1931	Perth	6 (plus perpetrator)	0	Roderick A. Davies, a 36-year-old carpenter, shot his wife and five children dead before taking his own life.
Boulder bombings	1 Feb 1942	Kalgoorlie, Western Australia	14 (plus perpetrator)	15	Bombing of a boarding house containing 30 people in Boulder, Western Australia by 45-year-old Pero Raecivich.
Glen Innes shooting	2 Jul 1948	Glen Innes, New South Wales	6	0	Frederick Charles Hall, a 48-year-old labourer shot his six children to death He was sentenced to death, later commuted to life imprisonment.
Murder of the Armanasco family	12 Oct 1950	Collie, Western Australia	6	0	40-year-old Raymond Armanasco killed his wife and five of his children in Collie near Perth. Armanasco was later sentenced to death, later commuted to life imprisonment.
Narella Street massacre	18 Feb 1957	Brisbane, Queensland	6 (plus perpetrator)	1	Marian Ryszard Majka killed six and injured a baby in two houses on Narella Street in Brisbane before taking his own life.
Warwick Farm gassing	5–6 May 1964	Warwick Farm, New South Wales	7	0	An entire family was found gassed to death in their Warwick Farm home. The victims were Herbert Darnley, his wife, Joyce, and their five children. A note was found on the front door of the scene, indicating a murder-suicide, although no perpetrator was reported as identified.
Crawford family murders	1 Jul 1970	Glenroy, Victoria	4	0	Elmer Crawford electrocuted and bludgeoned his pregnant wife and three children at their home, before putting the bodies into his car and pushing the car over a cliff at Loch Ard Gorge.
Hope Forest shooting	6 Sep 1971	Hope Forest, South Australia	10	0	Rampage killing by Clifford Bartholomew, who shot dead ten members of his family. It is the deadliest familicide in Australian history.
Whiskey Au Go Go fire	8 Mar 1973	Fortitude Valley, Queensland	15	unknown	Arson attack that killed fifteen and injured many more at a nightclub.
Savoy Hotel fire	5 Dec 1975	Kings Cross, New South Wales	15	unknown	Reginald John Lyttle set fire to newspapers in a hotel. Fourteen died from carbon monoxide poisoning and one from burns as a result of the fire.
Connellan air disaster	5 Jan 1977	Alice Springs Airport, Northern Territory	4 (plus perpetrator)	5	Suicide attack on Alice Springs Airport.
Weir family massacre	18 Jan 1977	Echuca, Victoria	5 (plus perpetrator)	0	Roger Bruce Weir, 32, shot and killed his five children at their home in Echuca with a .22 calibre single shot rifle before using the weapon to commit suicide.
Campsie murders	24 Sep 1981	Campsie, New South Wales	5 (plus perpetrator)	0	Rampage killing by Fouad Daoud, who shot dead five members of his family before killing himself.
Inland Motel murders	18 Aug 1983	Uluru, Northern Territory	5	16	Vehicular attack by Douglas Crabbe, who drove a truck into the bar of the Inland Motel after being refused service.
Wahroonga murders	1 Jun 1984	Wahroonga, New South Wales	5 (plus perpetrator)	0	Rampage killing by John Brandon, who shot dead five members of his family before killing himself.
Milperra massacre	2 Sep 1984	Milperra, New South Wales	7	28	Shootout between two rival motorcycle gangs. One bystander was among those killed in the incident.
Pymble shooting	23 Jan 1987	Pymble, New South Wales	4	0	Richard Maddrell went to the family home of his former girlfriend, shot her and three others.
Top End shootings	Jun	Top End, Northern Territory	5 (plus perpetrator)	0	Spree killing by Joseph Schwab over a five-day period. Shot dead by police.
Hoddle Street massacre	9 Aug 1987	Clifton Hill, Victoria	7	19	A spree shooting by Julian Knight.
Huynh family murders	10 Oct 1987	Canley Vale, New South Wales	5	0	Rampage killing by John Tran, who shot dead five members of a family.
Queen Street massacre	8 Dec 1987	Melbourne	8 (plus perpetrator)	5	A spree shooting/murder–suicide by Frank Vitkovic.
Oenpelli shootings	25 Sep 1988	Gunbalanya, Northern Territory	5	0	Rampage killing by Dennis Rostron, shooting five members of his family at Molgawo, a remote Arnhem Land outstation near Gunbalanya (formerly known as Oenpelli).
Surry Hills shootings	30 Aug 1990	Surry Hills, New South Wales	5	7	A spree shooting by Paul Anthony Evers who killed five people and injured seven with a 12 gauge pump-action shotgun at a public housing precinct in Surry Hills before surrendering to police.
Strathfield massacre	17 Aug 1991	Strathfield, New South Wales	7 (plus perpetrator)	6	A spree shooting/murder–suicide by Wade Frankum.
Central Coast massacre	27 Oct 1992	Terrigal, New South Wales	6	1	A spree shooting by Malcolm George Baker.
Greenough Family Massacre	21 Feb 1993	Greenough, Western Australia	4	0	William Mitchell murdered and sexually assaulted Karen MacKenzie, also murdering her three children with an axe at their remote rural property in Greenough, Western Australia. Mitchell was later convicted of the massacre and was sentenced to life with a minimum of 20 years and has been denied parole in 2013 and 2016, and in 2019 was banned from applying for parole for six years.
1993 Cangai siege	Mar	Cangai, New South Wales	5	0	Leonard Leabeater, Robert Steele and Raymond Bassett went on a nine-day rampage resulting in their taking hostages in a siege in a farmhouse at Hanging Rock Station in Cangai.
Wollongong Knife Murders	1994	Wollongong, New South Wales	4	0	Ljube Velevski, used a knife to kill his wife and three children in their Berkeley home near Wollongong in 1994.
Hillcrest murders	25 Jan 1996	Hillcrest, Queensland	6 (plus perpetrator)	0	Mass shooting. Peter May shot dead six members of his family before killing himself.
Port Arthur massacre	28 Apr 1996	Port Arthur, Tasmania	35	24	A spree shooting by Martin Bryant. The deadliest mass shooting in Australia. Led to the National Firearms Agreement between Australia's states, territories and federal government, mandating licenses and registration for gun owners and users, and banning semi-automatic long guns in most cases. See Gun laws in Australia.
Shoobridge family murders	28 Jun 1997	Richmond, Tasmania	4 (plus perpetrator)	0	Peter Shoobridge cut the throats of his four daughters whilst they slept then took his own life with a rifle after cutting off one of his hands with an axe.
Wyrzykowski family murders	3 July 1999	Karragullen, Western Australia	6 (plus perptrator)	0	Barbara-Anne Wyrzykowski gasses her five young children and herself in one of Western Australia’s worst murder-suicides. She was considered Australia’s presumed worst domestic violence killer.
Heath family murders	24 July 1999	Perth, Western Australia	5 (plus perptrator and a dog)	0	Unemployed laborer Mark Heath, gasses his four children and the family dog in the family’s van in a copycat mass murder.
Childers Palace Backpackers Hostel fire	23 Jun 2000	Childers, Queensland	15	unknown	Arson attack by Robert Paul Long, which killed fifteen international backpackers.
Churchill Fire	7 Feb 2009	Churchill, Victoria	10	unknown	Arson attack by Brendan Sokaluk that killed ten people, during the Black Saturday bushfires period.
Lin family murders	18 Jul 2009	North Epping, New South Wales	5	unknown	Blunt instrument attack that killed five members of the Lin family.
Gold coast quadruple murder	16 May 2011	Gold Coast, Queensland	4 (plus perptrator)	0	Paul Anthonty Rogers stabs his ex-girlfriend and her friend before kidnapping his daughter and gassing himself and her.
Quakers Hill Nursing Home fire	18 Nov 2011	Quakers Hill, New South Wales	11	unknown	Arson attack by Roger Kingsley Dean, a nurse, which killed eleven people.
Hunt family murders	9 Sep 2014	Lockhart, New South Wales	4 (plus perpetrator)	0	Murder–suicide, mass shooting, familicide. Geoff Hunt killed his wife and three children before turning the gun on himself.
Cairns child killings	19 Dec 2014	Cairns, Queensland	8	1 (self‑inflicted by suspect)	Stabbing attack and Familicide. Eight children aged 18 months to 15 years killed. Thirty-seven-year-old woman also found injured. The woman, Raina Mersane Ina Thaiday, was later charged with the murder of the children, seven of whom were hers, plus her niece.
January 2017 Melbourne car attack	20 Jan 2017	Melbourne, Victoria	6	27	Vehicular attack. Dimitrious (James) Gargasoulas drove a Holden Commodore into Bourke St Mall, resulting in the deaths of six people and injuring 27 others. Should not be confused with the December 2017 Melbourne car attack which killed one person.
Osmington shooting	11 May 2018	Osmington, Western Australia	6 (plus perpetrator)	0	Murder–suicide, mass shooting, familicide. A grandfather shot his four grandchildren at their home, his daughter, his wife, and then himself.
Bedford family massacre	Sep 2018	Bedford, Western Australia	5	0	Stabbing, familicide. Five people were fatally stabbed or bashed in a house in the suburb of Bedford near Perth. The victims were two adult women, one three year old girl, and two girls aged 18 months. In April 2019, 25-year-old Anthony Harvey pleaded guilty to murdering his five family members. Should not be confused with the 1879 Cape Bedford Massacre against Aboriginal people.
2019 Darwin shooting	4 Jun 2019	Darwin, Northern Territory	4	1	Spree shooting. Four people were killed and one person suffered a critical leg injury in a mass shooting allegedly carried out with a prohibited pump-action (Category C) shotgun. The shooter, 45-year-old Benjamin Glenn Hoffman, was charged with four counts of murder and later pleaded guilty to three counts. The shooter had been released from prison on parole in January 2019 and was wearing a GPS-tracked electronic monitoring bracelet at the time of the offence.
Camp Hill carjacking	19 Feb 2020	Camp Hill, Queensland	4 (plus perpetrator)	0	Domestic violence incident. Rowan Baxter set fire to his estranged wife's car, killing all four occupants, before committing suicide at the scene.
2024 Westfield Bondi Junction stabbings	13 Apr 2024	Bondi Junction, New South Wales	6 (plus perpetrator)	12 hospitalised	Mass stabbing. Joel Cauchi entered Bondi Junction Westfield shopping centre where he stabbed multiple people before being shot by police. Five victims, four women and one man, died at the scene, while a sixth victim, a woman, died in hospital. The injured victims include a young child, whose mother was the sixth victim.
2025 Bondi Beach shooting	14 Dec 2025	Bondi Beach, New South Wales	15 (plus 1 perpetrator)	40 (including 1 accused)	Mass shooting incident. Occurred at Bondi Beach in Sydney during a Hanukkah celebration. According to New South Wales Police 15 people were killed, and 40 were wounded. One of the perpetrators was killed in a shootout with police, while the other was injured and arrested.

== Attacks causing multiple non-fatal injuries ==
Mass violent attacks which caused many injuries but few deaths.

- Sydney Yugoslav General Trade and Tourist Agency bombing – in 1972, 16 people were wounded by a bomb planted at Yugoslav tourism agencies. Nobody was killed.
- Sydney Hilton Hotel bombing – in 1978, a bomb exploded outside the Hilton Hotel in Sydney, injuring 9 people and killing 3.
- Russell Street bombing – in 1986, 23 people were wounded when a car bomb ignited outside a Police Building. One of the wounded, a female police officer, died later of injuries from the explosion.
- December 2017 Melbourne car attack – in December 2017, a man drove a car into pedestrians, injuring 18 people (including himself) and killing 1. Should not be confused with the January 2017 Melbourne car attack.
- 2010 Darwin shopping centre bombing - a shopping trolley loaded with petrol cans and fireworks was deflagrated in a shopping center, injuring 19 people.
- Monash University shooting - a mass shooting which resulted in 2 deaths and 5 injuries.

== See also ==
Murders over an extended period of time:

- List of serial killers by country
- List of Australian criminals
- Timeline of major crimes in Australia

Indigenous massacres and conflicts:

- Australian frontier wars

Terrorism:

- Terrorism in Australia
- List of terrorist incidents in Australia

Crime:

- Crime in Australia
- List of Australian criminals
- Timeline of major crimes in Australia
- List of mass shootings in Australia
