= Timeline of major crimes in Australia =

This is a timeline of major crimes in Australia.

== 19th century ==
=== 1800s ===
- 4 March 1804 – Castle Hill convict rebellion.
- 26 January 1808 – George Johnston played a key role in the only successful armed takeover of government in Australia's recorded history, the Rum Rebellion. Johnston later sailed for England and was found guilty of mutiny.

=== 1820s ===
- 1821 – Bank of New South Wales Cashier Francis Williams embezzled £12,000 (approx. $3,202,000AU in 2024) from Australia's first bank.
- 20 September 1822 – Alexander Pearce, Bob Greenhill and six others escaped from Macquarie Harbour. Pearce and Greenhill later killed their fellow escapees and ate them.
- 1820s – Thomas Jeffrey was a bushranger, serial killer and cannibal in the early 19th century in Van Diemen's Land (now Tasmania, Australia). He and his gang killed four male adults and a five-month-old baby in the mid-1820s. He was executed by hanging on 4 May 1826.
- 10 February 1828 – Cape Grim massacre – Four shepherds with muskets ambushed over 30 Tasmanian Aboriginal people from the Pennemukeer band from Cape Grim, killing 30 and throwing their bodies over a 60-metre cliff into the sea.
- 14 September 1828 – Bank of Australia robbery

=== 1830s ===
- 10 June 1838 – Myall Creek Massacre – up to 30 Aboriginal people were slaughtered at the Myall Creek near Bingara in northern New South Wales. After two trials, seven of the 11 colonists involved in the killings were found guilty of murder and hanged.

=== 1840s ===
- June to July 1840 – Maria shipwreck massacre – 25 survivors of the Maria shipwreck were massacred along the Coorong under mysterious circumstances while being accompanied back to Adelaide by members of the Ngarrindjeri. Governor George Gawler ordered a hasty investigation and the execution of those responsible. A drumhead court-martial led to the execution of two Ngarrindjeri men.

=== 1850s ===
- 28 November to 3 December 1854 – Eureka Stockade gold prospectors staged an uprising against the government leading to armed conflict; 22 miners and 6 soldiers were killed

=== 1860s ===
- 30 June 1861 – Lambing Flat riots White miners rioted against Chinese immigrants.
- 17 October 1861 – Cullin La Ringo massacre in Central Queensland. Nineteen white settlers were killed, one of the largest massacres of whites by Aboriginal Australians in Australian history.
- 15 June 1862 – Eugowra gold escort robbery – Frank Gardiner's gang, including Ben Hall, stole 2700 ounces of gold worth more than 14,000 pounds.
- 9 April 1865 – Daniel Morgan, a prominent bushranger who had been raiding banks in Victoria and New South Wales for more than a decade, was killed.
- 27 April 1867 – Southern New South Wales bushrangers, Thomas and John Clarke were captured. They were hanged on 25 June that year.
- February to May 1868 – Flying Foam Massacre – confrontations between white settlers and Aboriginal people around Flying Foam Passage on Murujuga (Burrup Peninsula) resulted in the deaths of between 20 and 150 people
- 1869 – Bushranger Andrew "Captain Moonlite" Scott robbed the London Chartered Bank of Australia in Mount Egerton, Victoria escaping with £1,000.

=== 1870s ===
- October 1878 – Stringybark Creek Massacre – Victorian bushrangers, the Kelly Gang, ambushed and killed three police officers at Stringybark Creek.
- December 1878 – Bushranger Ned Kelly raided a bank in Euroa and, at a nearby sheep station, hosted a party for his 22 hostages shortly afterwards.

=== 1880s ===
- 26 June 1880 – Bushranger Joe Byrne shot and killed associated Aaron Sherritt; Byrne believe Sherritt had turned police informant
- 27 June 1880 – Ned Kelly's Last Stand – The Kelly Gang held the town of Glenrowan, Victoria, hostage at the town's inn in an attempt to ambush police. The attempt failed, and a siege ensued on the 28th, during which time three members of Kelly's gang and a young boy were killed, and Kelly was captured after being wounded by police.
- 24 July 1880 – John James MacGregor Greer shot his wife, Annice, M. A. Louis Soudry and himself at the Melbourne Opera House. He died; the others recovered.
- 16 May 1881 – Police Trooper Harry Pearce was viciously attacked by a prisoner, Robert Johnson, with a knife while on escort to Kingston SE. Pearce died of his injuries on 19 May, the second South Australian policeman to die while on duty. Johnson was executed at Mount Gambier Gaol on 18 November the same year.

=== 1890s ===
- 24 December 1891 – The Windsor murder – English gasfitter, confidence trickster and career criminal Frederick Bailey Deeming murdered his new wife Emily (née Mather) at a newly rented house in Andrew Street, Windsor, Melbourne, burying her body under the hearth. He had previously murdered his first wife, Marie Deeming, and their four children, and buried them beneath the floor of a house at Rainhill, England in July or August 1891. Their bodies were not discovered until after the Windsor murder. Deeming was arrested at Southern Cross, Western Australia, and after a trial at Melbourne, he was executed in June 1892. His notoriety in Australia was such that he was widely believed to be Jack the Ripper.
- 11 October 1896 – Joseph Thyer, a sheep farmer, murdered his wife and five children before hanging himself in Cavanagh, SA
- 1 March 1898 – Glover family tragedy – A mother murdered her six children and then committed suicide in the town of Triabunna, Tasmania
- 26 December 1898 – Gatton murders – Three members of the same family were murdered, the sisters having been sexually assaulted, near the town of Gatton, Queensland (unsolved)

== 20th century ==
=== 1900s ===
- 20 July 1900 – Jimmy Governor murdered four members of the Mawbey family and schoolteacher Helen Josephine Kerz at Breelong, NSW. Later, with his brother Joe, he murdered two old men, Alexander McKay and Kyrien Fitzpatrick, and members of the O'Brien family— mother and wife Elizabeth and her unborn child, along with her 10-month-old son— near Merriwa in the Upper Hunter district. After being on the run for around 100 days, Joe was shot dead and Jimmy was taken to Sydney for trial, where he was found guilty of the murder of Miss Kerz (not of any of his other victims) and hanged at Darlinghurst Gaol in January 1901.
- 2 January 1902 – Bertha Schippan was found murdered at Towitta, South Australia, two weeks before her 14th birthday. After an inquest, her 24-year-old sister Mary stood trial in Adelaide, but was acquitted.
- April 1902 – The charred remains of Albert Dahlke and Constable George Doyle of the Upper Warrego police station were found in Lethbridge's Pocket. They had set out during Easter 1902 to arrest James and Patrick Kenniff for horse-stealing. Strong suspicion for the murders fell on the Kenniffs. Sam Johnson, Doyle's aboriginal tracker, heard shots fired, and when he neared the arrest scene, the Kenniffs pursued him, but he escaped. Despite a reward of £1000 and a large police manhunt, the Kenniffs were not taken until 23 June at Arrest Creek, south of Mitchell.

=== 1910s ===
- 16 November 1911 – George David Silva shot and bludgeoned six members of the Ching family near Mackay, Queensland.
- 8 June 1913 – 11-year-old Ivy Mitchell was raped and murdered on her way home from school near Samford, Queensland by Ernest Austin; he was the last person in Queensland to be hanged.
- 1 January 1915 – Two Muslim men attacked a picnic train near Broken Hill, in what is known as The Battle of Broken Hill. Both attackers were shot dead by police; four other people were killed and seven wounded.
- 14 February 1916 – Liverpool riot – An initial strike by 5000 AIF soldiers from Casula near Liverpool became a three-day riot and pub crawl ending at Central and East Sydney, involving commandeered trains, destruction of property, and confrontations with police and military guards. NSW Premier William Holman called a state of emergency and closed Sydney's pubs. About 1000 soldiers were court-martialled and gaoled or discharged from the army. One consequence was the introduction of six o'clock closing, already present in South Australia, following a June 1916 referendum. The NSW "six o'clock swill" saw the rise of sly-grog shops and lasted until 1955 when the closing time was changed to 10 pm following another referendum.
- December 1917 – early 1918 – Wonnangatta murders – On 23 February 1918, in the remote Wonnangatta Valley in East Gippsland, Victoria, the badly decomposed body of Jim Barclay, the manager of Wonnangatta Station, was found near the station homestead. He had been shot from behind with a shotgun, and John Bamford, a cook and general hand, was assumed to be the culprit. However, Bamford's body was found late in 1918 on the Howitt Plains during a statewide search carried out after the winter snows had melted. He had also been shot from close range. No arrests were ever made, despite the State Government offering a £200 reward.

=== 1920s ===
- c.21 February 1921 – Murder of Chrissie Venn – A 13-year-old girl was found murdered outside the village of North Motton, near Ulverstone, Tasmania.
- 21 December 1921 – The Gun Alley Murder – 12-year-old Alma Tirtschke was found raped and murdered in Gun Alley, Melbourne. Although 29-year-old Colin Ross was hanged for the crime, a judicial re-assessment, prompted by author Kevin Morgan's book, found that Ross was probably innocent. After DNA testing cleared Ross, he was pardoned posthumously on 22 May 2008.
- May 1926 – Forrest River massacre – Western Australia – 11 people were murdered in a series of punitive raids after the murder of a pastoralist in the Kimberley region of Western Australia.
- 27 October 1927 – Squizzy Taylor died after a shootout with rival gangster Snowy Cutmore in Melbourne. Cutmore died in the same shootout.
- August 1928 – Coniston massacre – Northern Territory police constable William Murray led a series of raids on Aboriginal tribes in response to the murder of a local dingo trapper. The official death toll was 31, but some experts believe it was much higher.
- 23 February 1929 – Constable John Holeman was shot in Grenfell Street, Adelaide, by John Stanley McGrath while he was taking McGrath's motorcycle and sidecar to the City Watchhouse. Holeman died an hour and a half later. McGrath was sentenced to death, which was later commuted to life imprisonment, and served 15 years.
- 26 February 1929 – Father Andrew Thomas Edgar Archur murdered his five children and his wife and then set fire to their house in Devonport, Tasmania. He killed himself after the attack.
- December 1929 – May 1930 – The Murchison Murders – Snowy Rowles murdered three men in Outback Western Australia.

=== 1930s ===
- 21 August 1931 – Roderick A. Davies, a 36-year-old carpenter, shot his wife and five children dead before taking his own life in Perth.
- 1 September 1934 – Pyjama Girl murder – The body of a woman was found beaten and half burnt in a culvert near Albury, New South Wales.
- 1932–1934 – Caledon Bay crisis – A series of rapes, murders and retaliatory violence involving Japanese, Aboriginals and white Australians in the Northern Territory.
- 1935 – The Shark Arm Case – The arm of murdered man James Smith was disgorged by a tiger shark being held in a public exhibit in Sydney (unsolved).

=== 1940s ===
- 1–2 February 1942 – Boulder & Kalgoorlie bombings – Bombing of a boarding house containing 30 people in Boulder, Western Australia.
- 3 May – 4 November 1942 – Eddie Leonski, an American soldier stationed in Australia, murdered three women in Melbourne in what came to be called the Brownout murders. He was executed on 9 November 1942, under American military law.
- 2 July 1948 – Frederick Charles Hall, a 48-year-old labourer shot his six children to death near Glen Innes, New South Wales. He was sentenced to death, later commuted to life imprisonment.
- 1 December 1948 – The Tamam Shud case. A middle-aged man was found dead, presumably poisoned, at Somerton Beach near Glenelg, South Australia.

=== 1950s ===
- 12 October 1950 – 40-year-old Raymond Armanasco killed his wife and five of his children in Collie near Perth. Armanasco was later sentenced to death, later commuted to life imprisonment.
- 19 September 1952 – Betty Shanks was murdered; she was found the following morning in the front yard of a house on the corner of Thomas and Carberry Streets in The Grange. This is one of the classic unsolved Queensland cases.
- 18 February 1957 – Marian Majka killed his wife and daughter at Cannon Hill, Queensland. He then waited until neighbour Neil Irvine had gone to work, set fire to his house, and took a semi-automatic rifle across the road and opened fire, killing Irvine's wife and two of their three daughters, and another child. He then shot their dog and turned his gun on passers-by and passing cars, and opened fire on firefighters and police as they arrived. A friend and neighbour, Sergeant Jack Strickfuss (later awarded the George Medal), approached the house and tried to speak to Majka, who then killed himself.
- 29 July 1957 – At Bega, New South Wales, triple murder, Senior Constable Kenneth Desmond Coussens, his wife and 7-month-old son were killed when a home-made bomb placed on their veranda by Myron Bertram Kelly exploded and demolished the house. Kelly was angry after Coussens had issued him with several traffic fines.
- December 1957 – Sundown Murders – Sally (Thyra) Bowman, her daughter, Wendy Bowman, and family friend Thomas Whelan were shot and bludgeoned to death at Sundown Station in northern South Australia by Raymond John Bailey.

=== 1960s ===
- 7 July 1960 – Eight-year-old Graeme Thorne was kidnapped and murdered days after his parents won the Opera House Lottery.
- 19 July 1960 – Australia's first skyjacking/hijacking occurred on Trans Australia Airlines Flight 408.
- 5–6 May 1964 – An entire family was found gassed to death in their Warwick Farm home. The victims were Herbert Darnley, his wife, Joyce, and their five children. A note was found on the front door of the scene, indicating a murder-suicide, although no perpetrator was reported as identified.
- 1964 – The Nedlands Monster – Eric Edgar Cooke murdered eight people and assaulted 20 more during a crime spree in Perth.
- 24 November 1964 – Glen Sabre Valance was convicted of the murder of Richard Strang at Bordertown. He was the last person hanged in South Australia.
- 11 January 1965 – Wanda Beach Murders – Two teenage girls were murdered on a southern Sydney beach (unsolved).
- 11 May 1965 – A newborn infant was murdered and mailed to a post office in Darwin; the perpetrator was never identified.
- 26 January 1966 – Beaumont children disappearance – Three young children disappeared from Glenelg Beach in Adelaide, South Australia (unsolved).
- 10 February 1966 - Mr Stinky (aka the Donvale Rapist or Raymond Edmunds) murdered Garry Heywood and Abina Madill at Murchison East, near Shepparton, Victoria. They were attending a rock concert with their respective friends at the Shepparton Civic Centre, with their bodies being found by a pair of 17 year olds the next day. Heywood suffered a bullet wound to the head and Madill had been raped and bludgeoned to death.

=== 1970s ===
- 1 July 1970 – Elmer Crawford electrocuted and bludgeoned his pregnant wife and three children at their home in Glenroy, Victoria before putting the bodies into his car and pushing the car over a cliff at Loch Ard Gorge.
- 6 September 1971 – Hope Forest shooting – Clifford Cecil Bartholomew shot his wife, Heather, their seven children, his sister-in-law and his nephew to death with a .22-caliber rifle at their dairy farm in Hope Forest, South Australia. This was Australia's worst familicide on record as of May 2018. Initially sentenced to hang, he was instead imprisoned for life, and released on parole in 1979. After his release from prison, Bartholomew assumed a new identity, remarried and had seven adopted children. His new family only learnt about his past years after his death.
- 6 October 1972 – Faraday School kidnapping – A teacher and her six female pupils were kidnapped for A$1 million ransom in rural Victoria by unemployed friends Edwin John Eastwood and Robert Clyde Boland.
- 15 November 1972 – Ansett Airlines Flight 232 – Ansett Airlines flight 232 from Adelaide to Alice Springs was hijacked with 28 passengers and a crew of 4 aboard. A gun battle followed at Alice Springs Airport where the hijacker, Miloslav Hrabinec, shot himself.
- 8 March 1973 – Whiskey Au Go Go fire – 15 people were killed in an arson attack on a Brisbane nightclub.
- 25 August 1973 – Disappearance of Joanne Ratcliffe and Kirste Gordon – A schoolgirl and a pre-schooler vanished from the Adelaide Oval while attending an Australian rules football match.
- 13 November 1973 – Allan Baker and Kevin Crump were apprehended following a spree of violent crimes in which Ian James Lamb, 43 was robbed and murdered, and Virginia Gai Morse, 36 was kidnapped, raped and murdered. Both were sentenced to life imprisonment without parole.
- 1974 – Barbara McCulkin and her two daughters disappeared in Brisbane and were never seen again.
- 22 March 1975 – The Weckert Murders – Townsville couple Noel and Sophia Weckert were murdered on the Bruce Highway between Mackay and Rockhampton while en route to Emu Park for a skydiving event.
- 23 June 1975 – Murder of brothel madam Shirley Finn in Perth after her threat to expose corrupt practices of W.A. police and politicians. Multiple purported investigations and a 2017 coronial inquest have all failed to throw light on the case.
- 4 July 1975 – Juanita Nielsen Disappearance – Kings Cross newspaper publisher Juanita Nielsen disappeared after she had run a political campaign against local development and investigated links between developers and criminal activity (unsolved).
- 25 December 1975 – Savoy Hotel Fire – Reginald John Lyttle set fire to newspapers in a hotel in Kings Cross. Fourteen died from carbon monoxide poisoning and one from burns as a result of the fire.
- 21 April 1976 – Great Bookie Robbery – A gang of six men stole an undetermined sum (between $6 million and $12 million) from the Victoria Club in Queen Street, Melbourne.
- 22 September 1976 – 1976 Spring Hill shooting – William Robert Wilson shot 17-year-old Monika Schleus and 18-year-old Marianne Kalatzis dead and wounded Donald William Hepburn Galloway, Mavis Ethel Sanders, Virginia Hollidge and Quinto Alberti on Boundary Street, Spring Hill, Brisbane, in a random shooting. He was captured by heavily armed police later at a house where he was holding 5 people hostage. Wilson served three years in a mental hospital, and after being found fit for trial, pleaded guilty and was sentenced in 1980 to two consecutive life sentences for the murders, and concurrent 10-year sentences for the four attempted murders.
- 5 January 1977 - Connellan air disaster - Colin Richard Forman, 23 deliberately flew a hijacked Beechcraft Baron aircraft into the headquarters of Connellan Airways, killing 4 persons and injuring 4 more. Forman also died in the crash.
- 13 January 1977 - Easey Street Murders - Susan Bartlett, 28 and Suzanne Armstrong, 27 were found stabbed to death in their home in Collingwood, Victoria. It was evident that they had been sexually assaulted. In September 2024 a male, 65, was arrested at an airport in Rome, Italy, in connection with the crime.
- 18 January 1977 – Weir Family Massacre – Roger Bruce Weir, 32, shot and killed his five children at their home in Echuca, Victoria with a .22 calibre single shot rifle before using the weapon to commit suicide.
- 15 July 1977 – Donald Mackay disappearance – Anti-drug campaigner Donald Mackay from Griffith, New South Wales disappeared, presumed murdered. In 1986, James Frederick Bazley was sentenced to three consecutive terms of life imprisonment plus 12 years for the murder of Mackay, the murders of Crown witnesses Douglas and Isabel Wilson on 13 April 1979, and an armed robbery.
- 13 February 1978 – Sydney Hilton bombing – Three men were killed by a bomb blast outside the Commonwealth Heads of Government Regional Meeting in Sydney. Ananda Marga members were imprisoned but later pardoned and released.
- 22 April 1978 – The Truro murders were uncovered.
- 11 August 1978 – John Ernest Cribb raped Valda Connell before stabbing her and two of her children, Sally and Damien Connell, at Swansea, NSW.
- 22 November 1978 – The "Magnetic Drill Gang" stole $1.7 million from in the Murwillumbah bank robbery, the biggest bank robbery in Australian history.
- 1978–1979 – Paul Steven Haigh murdered six victims in order to cover up armed robberies.
- 9 June 1979 - The Ghost Train ride at Sydney Luna Park lights ablaze, killing six children and one adult. The fire was originally blamed on electrical faults but this was debunked by the electrical box being one of the only things left intact after the fire calmed. All the lights for the ride are also still on in pictures of the fire. Arson by known figures is highly speculated, specifically within the police. Signs of fire were noticed by prior riders but not reported due to the assumption that it was a part of the experience. Caro Meldrum-Hanna's 3 part docuseries delves into the specifics of the case.

=== 1980s ===
- 26 April 1980 – Louise and Charmian Faulkner disappearance – A mother and her two-and-a-half-year-old daughter disappeared from outside their St Kilda, Victoria, residence and are presumed murdered (unsolved).
- May 1980 and November 1981 – Tynong North and Frankston Murders – Six women were killed in Victoria (unsolved).
- 23 June 1980 – Family Court judge Justice David Opas was shot dead at his home by an unknown gunman.
- 24 September 1981 – Campsie murders – Fouad Daoud killed his wife, four of his children, and then himself in Campsie, New South Wales.
- 4 May 1982 – Kingscliff, NSW – Robin Reid, 34, and Nicole Pearce (Paul Luckman), 17, raped, tortured, bashed and murdered 13-year old Peter Aston. His friend, Terry Ryan escaped to raise help. Both Reid and Pearce were sentenced to life imprisonment. Pearce transitioned gender in 1990 and released in 1998.
- 22 June 1982 – Perth Mint Swindle – Forty-nine gold bars (68 kg in total) valued at up to A$653,000 (A$6.4 million at 2023 gold prices) were stolen from the Perth Mint in Western Australia. Three brothers, Ray, Peter and Brian Mickelberg, were found guilty of the conspiracy and sentenced in 1983 to twenty, sixteen and twelve years' imprisonment, respectively; all three were later exonerated.
- 10 November 1982 – Lawyer Randall Askeland murdered his wife, Wendy June Askeland, by bludgeoning her to death by with an iron bar while she was asleep in bed at their home in Launceston, Tasmania. He was sentenced to life in prison.
- 23 June 1983 – Martin Leach bound, gagged and stabbed Charmaine Ariet and bound, gagged, stabbed, raped and slit the throat of her cousin Janice Carnegie before burying their bodies in a gully at Berry Springs.
- 18 August 1983 – Douglas Crabbe rammed his 25-ton Mack truck into a motel bar at the base of Uluru, Northern Territory, killing 5 people and injuring 16.
- 19 September 1983 – 16-year-old Aboriginal boy John Pat was beaten to death by police officers in Roebourne, Western Australia. The officers were charged with manslaughter, but acquitted by an all-white jury. The killing of John Pat was one of the incidents that led to the Royal Commission into Aboriginal Deaths in Custody in 1991.
- 6 October 1983 – Edwina Boyle disappeared from her Dandenong home. It was determined that her husband, Frederick Boyle, had shot her in the back of the head with a .22-calibre rifle while engaging in an affair with a neighbour. He had concealed her remains in a barrel until they were found in 2006.
- 31 January 1984 – Sydney's 1984 'Dog Day Afternoon' – 35-year-old Hakki Bahadir Atahan went on a bank robbery spree, taking 11 people hostage and holding police at bay for several hours before being shot dead by Detective Senior Constable Steve Canelis on the Spit Bridge.
- 15 April 1984 – Bombing of the Parramatta Family law court building, followed by bombings at the homes of two judges in Sydney later in the year. The bomb which was detonated at the law court building did not injure anyone. However, one of the home bombings killed a judge's wife, and the other injured Justice Richard Gee. The incidents are largely considered unsolved.
- 1 June 1984 – Wahroonga murders – A Wahroonga man, John Brandon, murdered his three children, his wife and his mother before killing himself.
- 14 August 1984 – Fine Cotton Affair – A syndicate of trainers and bookmakers substituted one horse for another at a Brisbane horse race.
- 2 September 1984 – Milperra massacre – Two rival bikie gangs staged a shoot-out in the car park of a south-western Sydney hotel. Seven people were shot dead and 28 others injured.
- 6 November 1984 – Murder of Kylie Maybury – Six-year-old Melbourne schoolgirl Kylie Maybury was kidnapped, raped and strangled while she ran an errand to buy a bag of sugar for her mother. Gregory Keith Davies sentenced to minimum 28 years for her murder
- 9 May 1985 – Christopher Flannery disappearance – Known as "Mr-Rent-A-Kill", Melbourne hitman Christopher Dale Flannery disappeared without trace, presumed murdered (unsolved.)
- 2 February 1986 – Anita Cobby murder – Sydney nurse Anita Cobby was abducted, robbed, raped, brutalised and murdered by career criminals John Travers, Michael Murdoch and brothers Michael, Gary and Leslie Murphy.
- 6 February 1986 – Sallie-Anne Huckstepp murder – Sydney sex worker and police informant Sallie-Anne Huckstepp was found strangled and shot in Centennial Park. Convicted murderer Arthur "Neddy" Smith was charged with ordering the killing but was acquitted (unsolved).
- 27 March 1986 – Russell Street bombing – Four men planted a car bomb outside police headquarters in Russell Street, Melbourne; a 22-year-old policewoman was killed in the explosion and 22 others injured.
- 8 May 1986 – Sharron Phillips' disappearance – 20-year-old Sharron Phillips went missing after her car ran out of petrol on Ipswich Road at Wacol, Queensland (unsolved).
- 19 August 1986 – Samantha Knight disappearance – Nine-year-old Samantha Knight disappeared from a Bondi street; it was claimed by her kidnapper, convicted child sex offender Michael Guider, that he had accidentally overdosed her on sedatives. He received 17 years' imprisonment with a non-parole period of 12 years for manslaughter, to be served cumulatively with sentences for child sex offences. Knight's remains have not been found.
- 6 October 1986 – Mary Nielson, first victim of David and Catherine Birnie, was killed. The Birnies murdered three more women before being captured, and are suspected of killing up to eight women.
- 23 January 1987 – Richard Maddrell shot four teenage women to death with his shotgun in the Sydney suburb of Pymble.
- 15 July 1987 – 21-year-old Rodney Thomas Clarke raped nine-year-old Deborah Keegan three times before suffocating her in her home in western Sydney, which she shared with her three sisters and mother.
- 9 August 1987 – Hoddle Street massacre – 19-year-old Julian Knight killed 7 people and injured 19 at random in Hoddle Street, Melbourne, before surrendering to police.
- 19 June 1987 – Top End Kimberly shootings – German tourist Joseph Schwab shot 5 people to death in the Top End before being shot dead by police.
- 10 October 1987 – Canley Vale shootings – John Tran shot 5 people to death in Canley Vale, New South Wales before killing himself.
- 27 November 1987 – 12-year-old Sian Kingi was abducted, raped, tortured, stabbed and strangled in Noosa, Queensland by married couple Barrie Watts and Valmae Beck.
- 8 December 1987 – Queen Street massacre – Frank Vitkovic shot eight people dead and seriously injured five others in the Australia Post building in Queen Street, Melbourne before leaping to his death from an 11th-floor window.
- 8 September 1988 – Murder of Janine Balding – 21-year-old Janine Balding was abducted, robbed, raped and murdered by five homeless youths in Sydney's west. Stephen "Shorty" Jamieson, 16-year-old Matthew Elliott, and 14-year-old Bronson Blessington were convicted of Balding's murder and sentenced to life imprisonment plus 25 years without the possibility of parole.
- 25 September 1988 – Dennis Rostron shot his wife, Cecily, his two-year-old son, Preston, and one-year-old son, Zarack, and his in-laws, Dick and Dolly Murrumurru, to death at Molgawo, a remote Arnhem Land outstation near Gunbalanya, Northern Territory.
- 12 October 1988 – Walsh Street police shootings – Two police officers were executed in Melbourne (unsolved).
- 10 January 1989 – Colin Winchester murder – The Assistant Commissioner of the Australian Federal Police was shot dead outside his home in Canberra. In 1995 former public servant David Harold Eastman was convicted of the murder, but he was acquitted in a retrial in 2018.
- October 1989 – Sylvia Jill Cave disappeared while on holidays in Melbourne. In June 1993, her remains were discovered at a property in Mount Eliza. Her American boyfriend, Michael Jeffrey Rice, was sentenced to ten years' imprisonment with a non-parole period of six years for manslaughter.
- November 1989 – Leigh Leigh murder – Newcastle teenager Leigh Leigh was raped and murdered at a party on a Newcastle beach.
- 20 October 1989 – Tracey Wigginton lured and killed Edward Baldock, nearly decapitating him. Wigginton allegedly wanted to drink his blood. This was described as "one of the most brutal and bizarre crimes Australia has ever seen".
- 1989–1990 – North Shore Granny Murders – John Wayne Glover murdered six elderly women across Sydney's North Shore.

=== 1990s ===
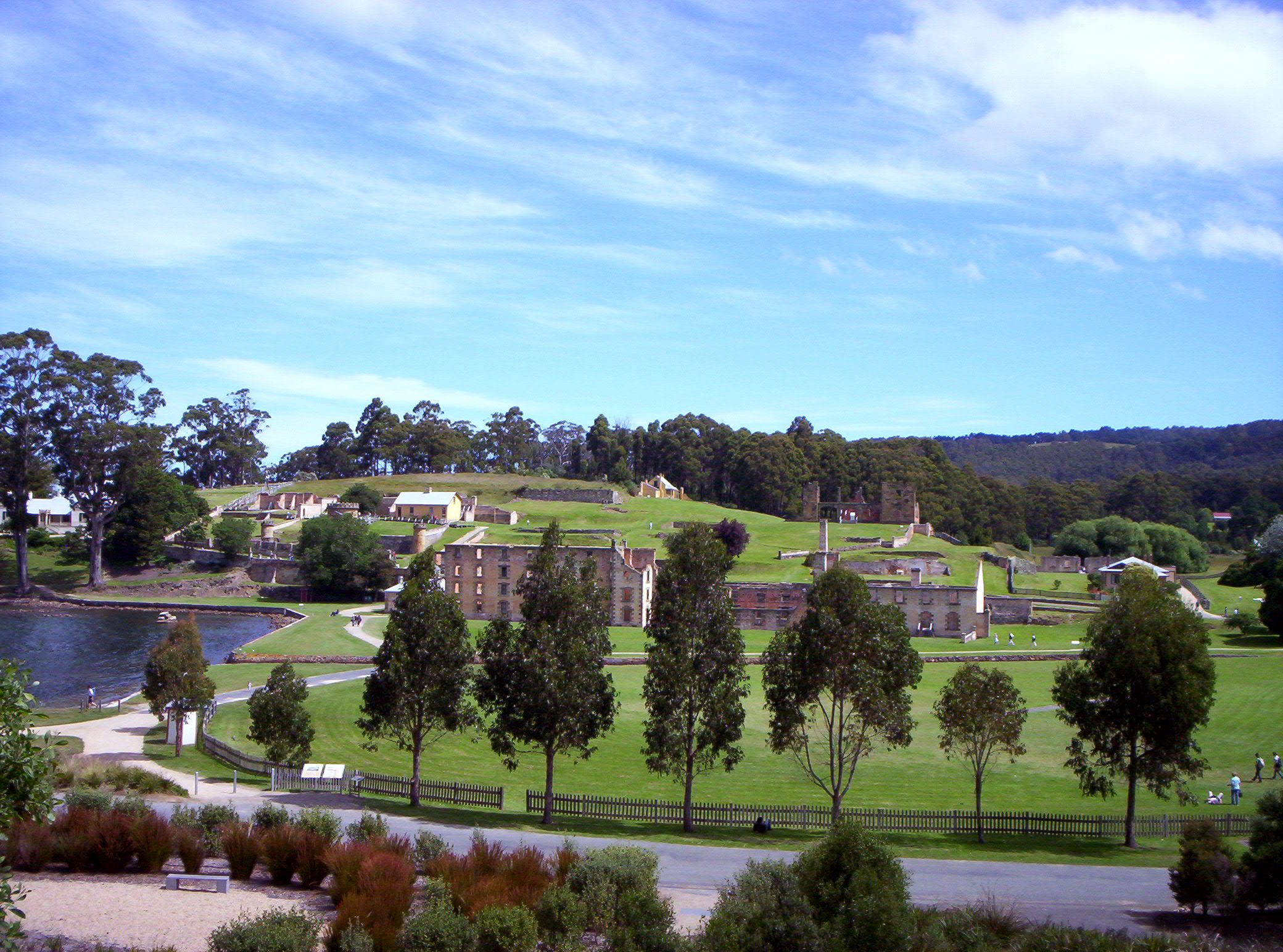
Port Arthur Prison Colony, site of the Port Arthur massacre

- 30 August 1990 – Surry Hills massacre – Paul Anthony Evers killed 5 people and injured 7 with a 12-gauge pump-action shotgun at a public housing precinct in Surry Hills, Sydney before surrendering to police.
- 4 December 1990 - Corin Dam triple-murder suicide - Darryl Gallagher killed his wife, Judith Gallagher, and two children, Jaime (8) and Kari (2), along with himself. After being let free on bail from domestic violence charges, he kidnapped his wife and children from their home, bound them, and drove to a location near Corin Dam, ACT, where he attached a bicycle tube to the exhaust pipe of the car and ran it into the car through the rear passenger window. The family died from carbon monoxide poisoning.
- 13 April 1991 – Karmein Chan was kidnapped and murdered, found in Thomastown, Victoria. the prime suspect for her abduction and murder is an unidentified serial child rapist known as "Mr Cruel", who had abducted and sexually assaulted a minimum of three prepubescent and adolescent girls in circumstances markedly similar to Karmein in the years prior to her abduction.
- 29 June 1991 – Six-year-old Sheree Beasley was kidnapped and raped and murdered by serial sex offender Robert Lowe at Rosebud.
- 4 July 1991 – World-famous heart surgeon Victor Chang was shot dead by two Malaysian men in Sydney during an extortion attempt.
- 17 August 1991 – Strathfield massacre – Wade Frankum shot six people dead and stabbed another to death before killing himself in a Sydney shopping centre.
- 29 July 1992 – Burwood triple murder – Ashley Coulston tied up Peter Dempsey, Kerryn Henstridge and Anne Smerdon and restrained them with handcuffs and thumbcuffs before shooting them execution-style in the back of the head in a house in Burwood, Victoria.
- 16 August 1992 – 18-year-old Clinton Trezise was bludgeoned to death with a hammer by John Justin Bunting at Bunting's Salisbury North home in the first of the twelve Snowtown killings.
- 19 August 1992 – Andrew Garforth kidnapped, raped and drowned nine-year-old schoolgirl Ebony Simpson at Bargo.
- 1988–1992 – The Backpacker murders – Ivan Milat murdered seven tourists and buried their bodies in the Belanglo State Forest.
- 27 October 1992 – Central Coast massacre – Malcolm George Baker went on a spree killing shooting six people dead and injuring one with a 12-gauge pump-action shotgun in Central Coast, New South Wales. He surrendered to police and was later sentenced to six consecutive terms of life imprisonment plus 25 years, without the possibility of parole.
- 7 February 1993 – Murders of the MacKenzie family – Karen McKenzie and her three children were murdered at their remote rural property in Western Australia by former farmhand, William Patrick Mitchell.
- 30 March 1993 – Cangai siege – Murderers Leonard Leabeater, Robert Steele and Raymond Bassett held hostages in a siege at Cangai, near Grafton, threatening to kill people indiscriminately. Leabeater killed himself the following day, while Steele and Bassett surrendered to police. Steele was sentenced to five consecutive life sentences plus 25 years without parole, while Bassett was sentenced to two consecutive life sentences with a non-parole period of 34 years. Steele hanged himself in prison on 23 December 1994.
- June and July 1993 – The Frankston serial killer, Paul Denyer, murdered three women before being captured.
- 21 August 1993 – John Lascano shot three people dead at a gunshop in the Melbourne suburb of Springvale before stealing a large quantity of firearms and ammunition and setting the store on fire.
- 29 November 1993 – Jolimont Centre siege – Felipe Ruizdiaz shot and wounded Geoff McGibbon at Dickson before crashing his vehicle, which was rigged with petrol and gas canisters, through the front glass walls of the Jolimont Centre in Canberra. During a two-hour siege at the centre, Ruizdiaz shot at police and rescue workers using a 12-gauge shotgun before setting fire to the building and committing suicide. The fire and explosions hampered rescue and police efforts and caused several million dollars' worth of damage to the centre.
- In 1994, Charles III then Prince of Wales, visited Australia. He was giving a speech in Darling harbour during the Australia day celebrations. David Kang ran up to the Prince and fired two blanks before falling onto the ground; he was arrested by multiple police officers. The Prince was unhurt and was ushered off the podium.
- 2 March 1994 – NCA Bombing – A parcel bomb exploded at the Adelaide office of the National Crime Authority, killing Detective Sergeant Geoffrey Bowen and injuring lawyer Peter Wallis.
- 2 May 1994 – Police went to arrest criminal Tony Grosser and were shot at. One of the officers, Derrick Mcmanus was shot fourteen times.
- 22 August 1994 – In a double murder-suicide in Stirling, Western Australia, Kyle and Latisha O'Neill were shot dead by their father Norm while they slept.
- 5 September 1994 – Sydney politician John Newman was assassinated outside his home on the orders of political rival Phuong Ngo.
- 29 October 1995 – Ten-year-old Leanne Oliver and nine-year-old Patricia Leedie were raped and beaten to death at Warana Beach, Queensland by convicted sex offender Paul Stephen Osbourne, a local handyman and mechanic.
- 25 January 1996 – Hillcrest murders – Peter May shot and killed his three children, his estranged wife and her parents in the Brisbane suburb of Hillcrest before killing himself.
- January 1996 – March 1997 – The Claremont serial murders – The murders of two young Australian women and the unresolved disappearance of a third in 1996 and 1997 in Claremont, Western Australia
- 28 April 1996 – Port Arthur massacre – Martin Bryant killed 35 people at Port Arthur, Tasmania and injured 21 others in a shooting spree.
- 14 September 1996 – Keli Lane was sentenced to 18 years in prison for the murder of her two-day-old daughter, Tegan, whose birth she had concealed.
- 10 October 1996 – Tjandamurra O'Shane was set on fire in a school playground in Cairns, Queensland by unemployed drifter Paul Wade Streeton.
- 15 June 1997 – Jaidyn Leskie, 15 months old, was murdered and found dumped at a dam near Moe, Victoria (unsolved).
- 20 September 1997 – 22-year-old Japanese woman Michiko Okuyama murdered by a 16-year-old boy in Cairns, Queensland.
- 6 October 1997 – Bega schoolgirl murders – 14-year-old Lauren Barry and 16-year-old Nichole Collins were kidnapped, raped, tortured and murdered by New Zealand-born career criminal Lindsay Beckett and Victorian prison escapee Leslie Camilleri.
- 16 January 1998 to 15 June 2009 – Melbourne gangland killings – A series of 35 murders of crime figures and their associates began with the slaying of Alphonse Gangitano in his home, most likely by Jason Moran. The last victim was Des Moran, who was murdered in Ascot Vale on 15 June 2009.
- 25 January 1998 - Tom and Eileen Lonergan are unintentionally abandoned in the Coral Sea off Australia's northeast coast on 25 January 1998 during a group scuba-diving trip aboard MV Outer Edge. The couple were not discovered to be missing until two days later, on 27 January 1998, after a bag containing their belongings was found on board the dive boat. A massive air and sea search took place over the following three days. Their disappearances served as the inspiration for the 2003 film Open Water.
- 12 June 1998 and 19 June 1998 – Mark Valera tortured and murdered Albion Park shopkeeper David O'Hearn and former Wollongong Lord Mayor Frank Arkell.
- 16 August 1998 – Victorian police officers Gary Silk and Rodney Miller were shot dead in an ambush by serial killer Bandali Debs and accomplice Jason Joseph Roberts in the Moorabbin Police murders.
- May 1999 – The Snowtown murders were discovered when the remains of eight bodies were found in six acid-filled barrels in an abandoned bank vault in Snowtown, South Australia. The remains of two more bodies were later discovered under a brick rainwater tank stand at a Salisbury North property, bringing the total number of victims to 12. One victim was found in Kersbrook.

== 21st century ==
=== 2000s ===
- 1972 – 15 September 2000 – Serial paedophile Geoffrey Robert Dobbs molested at least 63 girls in Queensland before his capture on 15 September 2000.
- 29 February 2000 – NSW woman, Katherine Knight stabbed, skinned, partially cooked and cannibalised her de facto husband John Price in Aberdeen, New South Wales. She also tried to serve his meat to their unsuspecting children but was stopped by police.
- 28 May 2000 – Keith William Allan was murdered in a contract killing in Melbourne.
- Winter 2000 – Sydney gang rapes – A series of ethnically motivated gang rapes by Lebanese origin youths swept Sydney's west.
- 23 June 2000 – Childers Palace Fire – Robert Paul Long set fire to a backpackers' hostel in Childers, Queensland; 15 people were killed.
- 9 June 2001 - David Naughton Drugged, bludgeoned and beat to death de facto partner Angela Connor aged 31 in her home cloverdale, Western Australia
- 10 July 2001 – Sef Gonzales beat, stabbed and strangled his sister Clodine, mother Mary and father Teddy within a two-and-a-half-hour time frame in their North Ryde home in Sydney, NSW.
- 14 July 2001 – British tourists Joanne Lees and Peter Falconio were assaulted near Barrow Creek, Northern Territory by Bradley John Murdoch. Although Falconio's body has never been found, Murdoch was found guilty of his murder.
- 4 April 2002 – Society Murders – Matthew Wales drugged and bludgeoned his mother, Margaret Wales-King, and stepfather, Paul King, to death before burying them in a shallow grave at Marysville, Victoria.
- 14 October 2002 – Dr. Margaret Tobin, the South Australian head of Mental Health Services, was shot dead by former colleague Jean Eric Gassy as she walked out of a lift in her Adelaide office building.
- 21 October 2002 – Monash University shooting – A student Huan Xiang opened fire in a tutorial room, killing two and injuring five.
- 22 October 2003 - Tina Watson dies under suspicious circumstances whilst scuba diving on her honeymoon with her new husband, Gabe Watson on the Great Barrier Reef. Tina allegedly began panicking underwater and when Gabe tried to help, she grabbed him and knocked his own air supply from his mouth. She dropped to the sandy bottom below, which Gabe told others in attendance 'was too fast of a descent for him to be able to follow and help'. Another diver recovered her body a few minutes later but unfortunately, CPR was unsuccessful. Many suspicious actions and accounts by Gabe, he was put on trial, but on 23 February 2012, Judge Tommy Nail dismissed the murder case due to lack of evidence.
- April 2003 – Pong Su incident – A North Korean freighter was boarded after a four-day chase and taken into custody in connection with a worldwide heroin smuggling operation.
- 15 September 2003 – Sydney Double Murders – Two Singaporeans murdered in their flat in Sydney.
- 7 December 2003 – Daniel Morcombe was abducted from under an overpass on the Sunshine Coast, Queensland while waiting for a bus; his remains were not found until 2012. Brett Peter Cowan was convicted of Morcombe's murder in 2014 and sentenced to life in prison.
- 23 March 2004 – John Sharpe murdered his pregnant wife and two-year-old daughter with a speargun at Mornington, Victoria.
- 11 February 2005 – Melbourne woman Maria Korp was found in a coma in the boot of her car. Her husband, Joe, and his lover, Tania Herman, were subsequently charged with her murder after Mrs Korp's life-support was switched off. Joe Korp subsequently hanged himself in the garage of his home.
- 26 February to 1 March 2005 – Macquarie Fields riots – Residents of the southwestern Sydney suburb rioted in response to the deaths of two youths during a police pursuit. The youths had been passengers in a stolen car being driven by a known criminal. Residents believed police were unfairly persecuting local youths.
- 1 June 2005 – Indonesian embassy bioterrorism hoax
- 4 September 2005 – Fathers' Day drowning – Robert Farquharson drove his car into a farm dam between Winchelsea and Geelong, Victoria, drowning his three children, Bailey (2), Tyler (7) and Jai (10). Police found the boys still strapped in their seatbelts. Robert is currently imprisoned for a minimum of 33 years for murder.
- December 2005 – 2005 Cronulla riots – Rioting between Anglo Australians and Arab Australians was sparked by the reported beating of Surf Life Savers the previous week by several individuals of "Middle-Eastern appearance"; retaliatory and counter-retaliatory violence continued for two weeks.
- 18 February 2006 – Cardross road crash – Thomas Graham Towle crashed his car at high speed into a group of 13 teenagers, killing six and injuring seven near the town of Cardross, Victoria.
- 26 June 2006 – Canning Vale murder – Eight-year-old Sofia Rodriguez-Urrutia-Shu was raped and murdered in a suburban Perth shopping mall by Dante Wyndham Arthurs.
- 18 December 2006 – Murder of Stacey Mitchell – The 16-year-old British-born girl was murdered on 18 December 2006 by couple Jessica Stasinowsky and Valerie Parashumti.
- 18 June 2007 – Melbourne CBD shooting – Christopher Wayne Hudson opened fire on three people, killing one and seriously wounding the other two. The three had intervened when Hudson was assaulting his girlfriend at a busy Melbourne intersection during the morning peak. He gave himself up to police in Wallan, Victoria on 20 June.
- 5 October 2008 - Outlaw motorcycle gang member and criminal underworld figure Todd O'Connor was murdered in Sydney. He was shot dead and he was shot 10 times. His body was found dumped in bushland. "Man acquitted of nightclub identity murder". news.com.au. 19 April 2011.
- 7 February 2009 – 2009 "Black Saturday" bushfires in Victoria, some of which were found to have been lit by arsonists. The fires killed 173 people in total.
- 14 April 2009 - Middle Eastern crime boss Abdul Darwiche was ambushed and was shot dead as he sat in his car in Bass Hill Sydney.[85] https://www.abc.net.au/news/2009-03-20/crime-rival-wanted-over-darwiche-murder/1625236
- 18 July 2009 – Lin family murders – Five members of the Lin family were found dead in their home in Epping, New South Wales.
- 3 September 2009 – Murder of Michael McGurk in Sydney, a contract killing.
- December 2009 – Deaths of Karlie Pearce-Stevenson and Khandalyce Pearce – A mother and her two-year-old infant were killed, and the killer subsequently used the dead mother's identity to withdraw roughly $90,000 from her bank accounts.

=== 2010s ===
- 10 April 2010 – Rajesh Osborne shot and killed his three children before killing himself in Roxburgh Park, Victoria.
- June 27 2010 - Brothers Luke Willis and Sam Willis were murdered from being shot dead by their neighbour Christopher Angelo Filippou in Newcastle. Christopher Angelo Filippou was sentenced to 31 years in prison with a non parole period of 25 years. https://www.abc.net.au/news/2010-06-28/man-charged-over-double-shooting-murder/884560
- 28 October 2010 - Daniel James Holdom is charged with the murder of mother and daughter, Karlie Pearce-Stevenson and Khandalyce Pearce. Pearce Stevenson was found in 2010 in the Belangalo State Forest, with her daughter being found five years later. It was discovered Pearce-Stevenson's mobile phone was used for years following her death to send false "proof of life" messages to family and friends. The mother and child's identities were exploited by third parties to commit social security and other types of identity fraud. There is evidence that there was a female accomplice, but she was never charged.
- 28 April 2011 – 2011 Hectorville siege – Donato Anthony Corbo shot Kobus and Annetjie Snyman and their son-in-law, Luc Mombers, to death and seriously wounded Mr Mombers' 14-year-old son, Marcel, and a police officer at Hectorville, South Australia, before being arrested after an eight-hour stand-off.
- 18 November 2011 – Roger Kingsley Dean deliberately set fire to two rooms at the Quakers Hill Nursing Home to hide his theft of prescription drugs; 11 residents were killed in the blaze and eight others injured.
- 30 August 2012 – Drug dealers Roy Yaghi and Jamie Grover were ambushed and were shot dead as they sat inside a ute in South Wentworthville Sydney. [96] https://www.dailytelegraph.com.au/bikie-links-to-double-murder-in-quiet-street/news-story/d8b96b9fed3109441fbcf68341e5db65
- 22 September 2012 – Radio producer Jill Meagher was raped and murdered by convicted criminal Adrian Bayley. She was abducted near her home in the Melbourne suburb of Brunswick.
- 8 March 2013 – Queen Street mall siege – Lee Matthew Hiller entered a shopping mall on Queen Street, Brisbane, armed with a handgun and threatened shoppers and staff, causing a 90-minute siege which ended when he was shot and wounded in the arm by a police officer from the Special Emergency Response Team.
- 12 February 2014 – 11-year-old, sixth-grade schoolboy Luke Batty was bashed with a cricket bat and stabbed to death by his father at his local cricket practice in Tyabb on the Mornington Peninsula in Victoria, apparently as retribution against ex-wife Rosie Batty.
- 28 June 2014 – 32-year-old woman originally from Hong Kong, Renea Yuk-ling Lau, was raped and murdered on her way to work in the morning in the Melbourne CBD. Her attacker, homeless man Scott Miller, was sentenced to 33 years in prison.
- 9 September 2014 – Lockhart massacre – Geoff Hunt shot and killed his wife and three children before killing himself on a farm in Lockhart, near Wagga Wagga, New South Wales.
- 23 September 2014 − 2014 Endeavour Hills stabbings – Two police officers, one Victorian, one Australian Federal Police (AFP), were stabbed and wounded outside Endeavour Hills Police station in Melbourne by 18-year-old Numan Haider, who was shot dead by a wounded officer.
- 15 December 2014 – Lindt Cafe siege – A terrorist attack where seventeen people were taken hostage in a cafe in Martin Place, Sydney, by Man Haron Monis. The hostage crisis was resolved in the early hours of 16 December, sixteen hours after it commenced, when armed police stormed the premises. Monis and two hostages were killed in the course of the crisis.
- 19 December 2014 – Cairns child killings – Eight children aged 18 months to 15 years were stabbed to death in a home in Cairns, Queensland by the mother of seven of the children and aunt to the eighth.
- 17 March 2015 – 17-year-old schoolgirl Masa Vukotic was murdered (stabbed 49 times) in a park in Doncaster, Melbourne. Her attacker, Sean Price, had randomly decided to murder her for sociopathic reasons. Price was sentenced to life in prison. Sean Price is a serial criminal, with a lengthy history of criminal charges of various types, including murder, rape, and armed robbery, beginning at least in 2002. Price had reportedly received 200 criminal convictions before murdering Vukotic. Shortly after murdering Vukotic, Price went on a crime spree, including rape, robbery, and an attempted carjacking.
- 5 April 2015 — Murder of Stephanie Scott — English and drama teacher Stephanie Scott was raped and murdered in Leeton NSW, on the school grounds by janitor Vincent Stanford. Stanford was later convicted of murder, and sentenced to life imprisonment without parole. An amphitheatre was later built in the school as a memorial to her death.
- 2 October 2015 – 2015 Parramatta shooting – Farhad Khalil Mohammad Jabar, a 15-year-old boy, shot and killed Curtis Cheng, an unarmed police civilian finance worker, outside the New South Wales Police headquarters in Parramatta. Jabar was shot and killed by special constables protecting the police station.
- 13 June 2016 – 18-year-old Aaron Pajich was stabbed to death in Orelia, Western Australia. Two women were convicted of his murder and sentenced to life in prison.
- 20 January 2017 – January 2017 Melbourne car attack – Dimitrious "Jimmy" Gargasoulas stabbed his brother and then drove erratically in Melbourne's CBD, hitting thirty pedestrians on a footpath, killing six.
- 5 June 2017 – 2017 Brighton siege – Somali immigrant Yacqub Khayre took a female sex worker hostage in the suburb of Brighton in Melbourne, and then shot the apartments clerk dead, before being killed in a shoot-out with police.
- 21 December 2017 – December 2017 Melbourne car attack – Around 4:30 pm AEDT, a car struck pedestrians at the corner of Flinders Street and Elizabeth Street in Melbourne, Victoria. Nineteen people, including the driver, were injured. One later died.
- 11 May 2018 – Osmington shooting – The bodies of three adults and four children were found shot dead on a farm in the town of Osmington, Western Australia.
- 13 June 2018 – 22-year-old comedian Eurydice Dixon was raped and murdered on a soccer pitch in Princes Park, Carlton. Her attacker, Jaymes Todd, was sentenced to life in prison.
- 9 November 2018 – Melbourne stabbing attack – A Somalian-born man armed with a knife went on a rampage in Bourke Street, Melbourne, stabbing three people. One man died, while the other two victims were wounded. The perpetrator was shot once in the chest by police and died the same evening.
- 16 January 2019 – 21-year-old international student of Palestinian ethnicity and Israeli citizenship, Aya Maasarwe, was raped and murdered on her way home from a comedy club in Bundoora, North Melbourne. Her attacker, Codey Herrmann, was sentenced to 36 years in prison.
- 16 April 2019 – 56-year-old Dr Luping Zeng died after being shot in the garage of his MacGregor, Queensland home while his wife and daughters were inside.
- 24 April 2019 – 32-year-old woman Natalina Angok, originally from South Sudan, was murdered by her boyfriend Christopher Bell in the Melbourne Chinatown, in the CBD. Bell reportedly suffered from schizophrenia and had been released from a psychiatric hospital a week before the murder. Bell had a history of committing domestic violence. Bell was sentenced to 21 years in prison.
- 25 May 2019 – 25-year-old woman Courtney Herron was murdered in Royal Park, Melbourne. Her attacker was Henry Hammond. Herron, an "aspiring social worker", had met Hammond the previous day, and she had been friendly towards him, spending the night with him at a restaurant and paying for his meal. Herron and Hammond had been walking together in the park several hours later, at which point Hammond brutally bashed her to death with a tree branch over the course of fifty minutes. Hammond was found not guilty of the murder on account of his schizophrenia; instead, he was ordered to spend 25 years in a psychiatric hospital. Hammond had been convicted of other crimes beforehand, including domestic violence (convicted in December 2018). Both Herron and Hammond were homeless at the time.
- 4 June 2019 – 2019 Darwin shooting – A man shot 5 people in Darwin, Northern Territory, killing 4 and wounding 1.

=== 2020s ===
- 19 February 2020 – (Hannah Clarke) and her three children were attacked in a car in Camp Hill, Queensland by her estranged husband, Rowan Baxter. The three children died at the scene and Clarke died in hospital. Baxter, who was known to have a history of domestic violence, died by suicide at the scene.
- 1 May 2020 – South Hedland stabbing attack – A man went on a stabbing rampage in a hotel, McDonald's carpark and a shopping centre in Port Hedland stabbing and wounding seven people. He was later shot dead by police.
- In June 2021, Australian police together with American and other countries police forces arrested dozens of drug smugglers and murderers worldwide in what was known as the ANOM operation.
- 16 October to 3 November 2021 – Cleo Smith, a four-year-old girl from Carnarvon, disappeared on 16 October 2021 from a campsite in the Gascoyne region of Western Australia (WA). Police allege that she was abducted by a 36-year-old man. She was found alive and well on 3 November, after the man's home was raided by police.
- 11 or 12 January 2022 – Killing of Charlise Mutten – The murder of a 9 year old schoolgirl by her stepfather Justin Stein, who has since been charged.
- 12 December 2022 – Wieambilla police shootings – The murder of Queensland Police officers Constables Matthew Arnold and Rachel McCrow, and a neighbour, Alan Dare in Wieambilla. The perpetrators, brothers Gareth and Nathaniel Train, and Gareth's wife, Stacey Train were later shot and killed by Queensland police after a six-hour siege.
- 29 July 2023 – Leongatha mushroom murders – A poisoning murder that resulted in 3 deaths. Erin Patterson was convicted of three murders and one attempted murder on 7 July 2025, and sentenced to life imprisonment with a non-parole period of 33 years on 8 September 2025.
- 13 April 2024 – 2024 Westfield Bondi Junction stabbings – A mass stabbing took place at Westfield Bondi Junction shopping centre leaving six people dead and twelve others injured. The perpetrator was shot dead by police.
- 15 April 2024 – 2024 Wakeley church stabbing – A 16-year-old boy perpetrated a knife attack at Christ The Good Shepherd Church in Wakeley.The attacker first stabbing Bishop Mari Emmanuel and Father Isaac Royel before injuring another church goers in the terrorist attack.
- 6 December 2024 – 2024 Melbourne synagogue attack – An arson terrorist attack took place at the Adass Israel Synagogue of Melbourne in Ripponlea. The resulting fire injured one member of the synagogue and caused significant damage to the building.
- 26 August 2025 - Porepunkah police shootings - Self-proclaimed sovereign citizen Desmond Freeman allegedly killed two Victoria Police officers and injured another at a property near Porepunkah. On March 30, 2026, Freeman was shot and killed by Victoria Police.
- 14 December 2025 – 2025 Bondi Beach shooting – An active shooter attack occurred at a Jewish community event at Bondi Beach, Sydney, resulting in fifteen confirmed deaths and at least forty people injured.
- 22 January 2026 - 2026 Lake Cargelligo shootings - Three people a man and two women were shot dead and another man was shot and wounded in the New South Wales town of Lake Cargelligo by Julian Ingram. The body of Julian Ingram was later found in a ute in bushland. He committed suicide.
- 30 April 2026 - Killing of Kumanjayi Little Baby - The body of missing 5 year old Aboriginal girl was found in bushland near Alice Springs in the Northern Territory. It is alleged that she was abducted, raped and murdered by a 47 year old Jefferson Lewis who had recently been released from prison. Lewis was later arrested and charged by police.
- 24 October 2026 - Brisbane mass shooting - Three men who are members of an outlaw motorcycle gang and a woman who was an innocent bystander were shot and wounded inside a boxing match venue in Logan Brisbane. The three men and the woman remained in hospital in a critical condition. The 3 men later recovered from their injuries while the woman later died from her injuries [145]https://www.nine.com.au/australia-news/qld/logan-shooting-drive-by-shooting-in-queensland-leaves-four-people-in-hospital-20261025-p618bi.html

== See also ==
- Crime in Australia
- List of Australian criminals
- List of Australian serial killers
- List of disasters in Australia by death toll
- List of mass shootings in Australia
- For information and debate pertaining to the massacre and genocide of Aboriginal and Torres Strait Islanders people, see Indigenous Australians, Black War and History Wars
