= Julian Knight =

Julian Knight could refer to:

- Julian Knight (murderer) (born 1968), an Australian murderer
- Julian Knight (politician) (born 1972), a British Conservative politician
