= 1984 Sydney bank robbery =

Robbery and hostage situation in Australia

- Location: Commonwealth Bank, George Street, Sydney, and the Spit Bridge, Middle Harbour Australia
- Date: 31 January 1984; 10:30 a.m. – 4:30 p.m.
- Target: Commonwealth Bank and the Spit Bridge
- Attack type: Hostage-taking, robbery, siege, shootout
- Weapon: Pistol
- Deaths: 1 (the perpetrator)
- Injuries: 3 (at least 1 from gunfire)
- Perpetrator: Hakki Bahadir Atahan
- Motive: Robbery

The 1984 Sydney bank robbery and hostage crisis was an incident that took place between the hours of 10:30 a.m. and 4:30 p.m. on 31 January 1984 in George Street, Sydney, New South Wales, Australia, when a 35-year-old male went on a bank robbery spree, taking 11 people hostage, before holding police at bay for several hours before finally being shot dead. The event was described as "Australia's most dramatic hostage chase" with "scenes likened to a Hollywood action film."

== Perpetrator ==
Turkish born 35-year-old Hakki Bahadir Atahan was unemployed at the time of his armed robbery spree and had carried out around 16 or 17 bank robberies between March 1983 and January 1984. Atahan lived an expensive lifestyle renting a luxurious penthouse apartment in Manly, owned several expensive cars and robbed up to three banks a day, amassing over A$150,000 in a year.

== Events ==
On the morning of 31 January 1984, Atahan had successfully robbed two or three banks before entering the Commonwealth Bank in George Street, Sydney. Due to the earlier robberies, police were on high alert and quickly responded to the Commonwealth Bank robbery with dozens of heavily armed tactical police from both the Tactical Response Group (TRG) and the Special Weapons & Operations Section (SWOS), forming a perimeter. During negotiations, Atahan fired at least two shots from a pistol and released all the bank's customers. Some time later, Atahan released four female bank staff whilst keeping five male staff as hostages.

Some two-and-a-half hours later, Atahan ended negotiations and emerged from the bank encircled by the five hostages, each of whom was forced to place a hand atop the robber's head. This tactic caused confusion and prevented police marksmen from obtaining a clear view, and thus depriving them of the opportunity to shoot him. Atahan forced the five hostages into a nearby Datsun sedan which had its keys left in it. He then forced a hostage to drive through police roadblocks, which began a pursuit that lasted several hours and involved 39 police cars, a police helicopter and four Water Police launches. After two hours of driving around, Atahan released a hostage and collected his 23-year-old girlfriend Sharon Oliver.

Upon reaching the Spit Bridge, police raised the bridge, preventing Atahan from travelling any further. Detectives from the Special Weapons & Operations Section (SWOS) approached the vehicle, ordering Atahan to surrender. Atahan fired his .32 ACP revolver at point-blank range at Detective Senior Constable Steve Canellis, striking him just above his nose. Detective Senior Constable Donald Packer fired one shot at Atahan through a side window while Detective Sergent John Nagle shot a round through the back window. Atahan was hit in the head and chest and died. Detective Senior Constable Canellis survived his gunshot wound and returned to work four months later and retired a number of years after with the bullet still lodged in his shoulder.

== Aftermath ==
The incident, including news footage from the time, features in the 2009 Australian TV series Gangs of Oz, Episode 4 – "Armed and Dangerous".

== Casualties ==
- Detective Senior Constable Steve Canellis – shot in the face at point-blank range, but survived.
- Two hostages – rushed to the hospital with undisclosed minor injuries.
- Hakki Bahadir Atahan – shot dead by police.

== See also ==
- List of bank robbers and robberies
- Timeline of major crimes in Australia
- Crime in Australia
