= Michael Guider =

Australian child sex offender and manslaughterer (1950–2024)

Michael Anthony Guider (20 October 1950 – 7 September 2024) was an Australian child sex offender who was widely described in the media as one of New South Wales’ most notorious criminals. In 1996 he was convicted on 60 counts of child sexual abuse involving eleven victims. In 2002 he received an additional sentence after pleading guilty to the manslaughter of nine‑year‑old Samantha Knight, who disappeared from Bondi in 1986 and whose body has never been found.

Guider’s offending typically involved sedating children known to him before molesting and photographing them while they were unconscious. His imprisonment was followed by repeated parole reviews, public controversy, and legal efforts to keep him detained under extended supervision orders. He was released under strict conditions in 2019, returned to custody in 2022 for breaching those conditions, and died in hospital in 2024 at the age of 73.

== Early life ==
Michael Guider was born in Melbourne in 1950. He moved with his mother to Sydney in 1952, and a younger brother, Tim, was born the following year. The boys spent periods in institutional care at Melrose Boys Home due to their mother’s instability. Guider later told prison psychologists that he had been sexually abused by his mother and at the boys’ home.

In the 1970s he was charged with several offences after setting fire to a shop owned by a former partner. He worked as a gardener at the Royal North Shore Hospital and developed an interest in Aboriginal history, surveying Indigenous sites around Sydney and later producing self‑published booklets on the subject.

== Criminal offending ==
Guider’s sexual offending spanned many years and involved children known to him. His method typically involved administering sedatives before molesting and photographing his victims. In 1996 he was convicted on 60 charges of child sexual abuse involving eleven children and received a lengthy custodial sentence.

While in prison he was held under strict protection at Goulburn Correctional Centre and was assaulted on multiple occasions.

== Samantha Knight ==
Samantha Knight

Samantha Terese Knight, aged nine, disappeared from Bondi on 19 August 1986. Despite extensive searches, she was never found.

Police attention turned to Guider in the late 1990s. Investigators established that he had molested Knight and two other girls at a house in Manly in 1984–85. He was charged with Knight’s murder in February 2001.

On 7 June 2001 he pleaded guilty to manslaughter, telling police he had drugged Knight in the same manner as his other victims and claimed her death was accidental. In August 2002 he was sentenced to 17 years’ imprisonment, with a non‑parole period of 12 years, to be served cumulatively with his earlier sentences.

Knight’s body has never been found. Guider gave inconsistent accounts of what he claimed to have done with her remains, and police searches of locations he nominated did not locate her.

== Other case ==
=== Renee Aitken ===
Five‑year‑old Renee Aitken disappeared from Narooma in February 1984. Police identified another man, Brian James Fitzpatrick, as the chief suspect; he died before an inquest could be held.

In the mid‑2000s, Denise Hofman, co‑author of Forever Nine, suggested Guider might have been involved based on circumstantial material found among his possessions. Police reviewed the information but stated there was insufficient evidence to pursue the theory.

== Authorship ==
While in prison, Guider wrote a series of self‑published booklets on Aboriginal sites and history around Sydney. Copies were distributed to local councils and libraries and are held by the State Library of New South Wales.

== Parole and supervision ==
Guider became eligible for parole in June 2014, but the State Parole Authority rejected his application, citing inadequate post‑release planning. His parole was again refused in 2017.

In 2019 authorities sought to keep him in custody beyond the expiry of his sentence. The Supreme Court imposed an interim detention order before ruling that he could be released under a strict five‑year supervision order. He was released on 5 September 2019.

== Reoffending ==
On 29 September 2022, Guider was arrested after a search of his Fairfield Heights residence allegedly uncovered prohibited material on his mobile phone. He was charged with breaching his extended supervision order and was remanded in custody.

He was later sentenced to a maximum of three years’ imprisonment, with a non‑parole period of two years and three months.

== Death ==
Guider died at the Prince of Wales Hospital in Randwick on 7 September 2024.

== In popular discussion ==
Guider’s younger brother, Tim Guider, has spoken publicly about their upbringing and his brother’s crimes, including in a 2019 60 Minutes Australia interview. He later published a memoir, Good Brother Bad Brother, discussing their lives and the disappearance of Samantha Knight.

== Bibliography ==
=== Books ===
- Guider, Tim (2020). Good Brother Bad Brother. ISBN 9781661890094.
- Hofman, Denise; Kidman, John (2013). Forever Nine: The Untold Story of Bondi's Missing Schoolgirl Samantha Knight. Five Mile Press. ISBN 9781743468920.

=== Archival material ===
- Michael Guider papers, 1972–1980. State Library of New South Wales, MLMSS 3702.
- Michael Guider – further papers, 1996. State Library of New South Wales, MLMSS 3702 ADD-ON 2080.
- Michael Guider – further papers concerning Aboriginal history, 1997–1998, 2003–2004. State Library of New South Wales, MLMSS 3702 ADD-ON 2184.

== See also ==
- Timeline of major crimes in Australia
