= 2019 Darwin shooting =

2019 mass shooting in Darwin, Northern Territory, Australia

- Location: Darwin, Northern Territory, Australia
- Date: 4 June 2019
- Attack type: Mass shooting, spree shooting
- Weapon: 12-gauge Winchester Defender pump action shotgun
- Deaths: 4
- Injuries: 1
- Perpetrator: Benjamin Glenn Hoffmann
- Motive: Revenge, Jealousy and Paranoid beliefs
- Verdict: Guilty
- Convictions: 3 life sentences without parole plus 15 years
- Convicted: Murder (3 counts); Manslaughter (1 count)

On 4 June 2019, a mass shooting occurred in Darwin, Northern Territory, Australia. The Northern Territory Police confirmed that four people were killed in the incident and another one was injured. A 45-year-old man, Benjamin Glenn Hoffmann, was arrested and subsequently convicted for murder and manslaughter.

== Attack ==
The attacks occurred over multiple locations starting at 5:39 pm. According to one news source:

"Shots had rung out near Finnis Street just outside the CBD before the man moved to other locations – including The Buff Club, Stuart Park, the Palms Motel, a Coles Express and Jolly Street in Woolner."

Witnesses say the gunman entered the Palms Motel on McMinn Street, Darwin and used a pump-action shotgun to shoot through a guestroom door. According to sources, around 20 shots were fired by the suspect. Witnesses also noted that while in the motel the gunman went from "room-to-room" while screaming out "Alex".

Police responded to the incident and the city centre near the motel remained in lock-down for an hour after the attack. The media reports that about 100 police were involved including officers from the Territory Response Group. Northern Territory Police Commissioner, Reece Kershaw described the weapon as "a prohibited 12-gauge pump-action shotgun", and said it may have been stolen as far back as 1997. Police say that the suspect used seven vehicles to visit other places located in the city.

After the motel shooting, the suspect fled in a Toyota utility and remained at large for about an hour before being detained after notifying police of his location at the intersection of McMinn and Daly Streets. At the time of his arrest, the man, a suspected member of a motorcycle gang who had been released from prison in January, was wearing an electronic monitoring bracelet. The suspect was also taken to Royal Darwin Hospital after being injured with a knife and tasered.

== Victims ==
The deceased were all male: one man was reportedly killed at the motel, one at Buff Club, one at Gardens Hill Crescent, and one at Jolly Street.

In addition, at the motel, a 23-year-old woman was shot multiple times in the legs. She was helped by a witness at the scene, and later taken to Royal Darwin Hospital.

== Perpetrator ==
The suspect was identified by as Benjamin Glenn Hoffmann, aged 45. Commissioner Kershaw said that Hoffmann had been released from prison on parole in January 2019. He had been serving a six-year prison sentence, eligible for parole after four years. He committed a minor violation of his parole conditions, breaking curfew by less than an hour, and was imprisoned again for two weeks, being released in early May. During his parole he had been drug tested, with all results negative. Police also revealed that they stopped the suspect for speeding hours before the shooting.

The suspect's motivation remains unclear, but Kershaw said the suspect may have been looking for certain individuals. One of the individuals may have been called "Alex". Police believe "Alex" was outside the Northern Territory at the time of the attack.

== Legal proceedings ==
On 5 June 2019, four charges of murder were laid against Hoffmann.

Hoffman was to stand trial in February 2020, but due to a dispute with NT Legal Aid, he initially had no legal representation. He entered a plea of not guilty to all counts, with Hoffman's lawyer indicating on 23 April 2020 that he would run a defence of mental impairment due to psychiatric illness.

Hoffman's trial began on 21 September 2021 at Darwin Supreme Court. He was charged with the murders of four people, and with committing ten other serious offences, including threatening to kill and recklessly endangering life. At the start of the seventh week of his trial, he changed his plea to guilty of the murders of Baydoun, Sisois, and Courtney, and to the manslaughter of Hellings. He additionally pleaded guilty to half the other charges.

Hoffmann sacked his legal team on 18 November 2021, requesting the court replace them. His sentencing hearing underwent a number of delays until a sentence was delivered in October 2022.

On 13 October 2022, Hoffmann was given three life sentences without the possibility of parole for three of the murders, and a 15-year term of imprisonment for the manslaughter of a fourth victim.

== Reactions ==
The Prime Minister of Australia, Scott Morrison, commented that the shooting was not terrorism related. Michael Gunner, Chief Minister of the Northern Territory, stated that his thoughts were with the families and friends of the victims, stating "This is not the Darwin we know".

== See also ==
- List of mass shootings in Australia
- List of massacres in Australia
- Timeline of major crimes in Australia
