= Bank of Australia robbery =

The Bank of Australia robbery was the first bank robbery in Australia. On 14 September 1828 a gang of five robbers—William Blackstone, George Farrell, James Dingle, John Wilford (alias "Creighton") and Valentine Rourke—tunnelled through a sewage drain into the vault of the Bank of Australia in George Street, Sydney, and stole some £14,000 in promissory notes and coins. The crime was discovered the following day. Although suspicions immediately fell on Blackstone, Farrell and Dingle, they escaped an indictment until Blackstone turned informer two years later. By then, Creighton was dead and Rourke had left the country. Only Dingle and Farrell faced the Supreme Court of New South Wales on 10 June 1831. Both were found guilty but escaped the gallows because of convict attaint: that is, legal concerns as to whether Blackstone's evidence was admissible because of a previous death sentence.

== See also ==
- List of bank robbers and robberies
- Timeline of major crimes in Australia
- Crime in Australia
