= Queen Street massacre =

1987 spree-killing in Melbourne, Australia

- Surveillance camera photo of Frank Vitkovic during the shooting
- Location: 37°48′51.3″S 144°57′36.4″E; Melbourne, Victoria, Australia
- Date: 8 December 1987; 38 years ago 4:22 – 4:27 p.m.
- Attack type: Mass murder, mass shooting, murder-suicide
- Weapon: M1 carbine (sawn-off)
- Deaths: 9 (including the perpetrator)
- Injuries: 5
- Perpetrator: Frank Vitkovic
- Motive: Suicidal ideation; Homicidal ideation; Misanthropy; Anger over academic failure

The Queen Street massacre was a mass shooting that occurred on 8 December 1987 at Australia Post offices on 191 Queen Street in Melbourne, Victoria, when 22-year-old Frank Vitkovic, a former tennis player and law school withdrawee, entered the building on the pretext of visiting a friend, and opened fire on office workers at random with an illegally modified M1 carbine, killing eight and injuring five. After being disarmed, he crawled from an 11th-floor window and died on impact.

== Background ==
Vitkovic was born on 7 September 1965 to a Croatian father and an Italian mother, Drago and Antoienetta. Drago worked as a self-employed painter, while Antoienetta worked mainly as a domestic worker in hospitals. Along with an older sister, Frank grew up in the Melbourne suburb of West Preston. He attended Redden Catholic College (formerly Immaculate Heart College, Preston, later renamed Samaritan Catholic College) in Preston. At school he was known as an intelligent child, one who memorised statistics and sports scores so much he became known as "The Stats Man", but was still quiet and shy. He played cricket during school but later pursued tennis, winning a number of local club competitions.

After graduating, he started a law degree course at Melbourne University in 1984. While running in October 1984 he suffered a minor knee injury that required multiple surgeries but later fully healed. Following a complicated diagnosis and recovery process however the injury became a major fixation in Vitkovic's mind, and he began to believe he was permanently disabled. It caused him to spiral into depression, subsequently giving up playing tennis and taking a leave of absence from university in August 1985. In December 1986, almost a year before the massacre, the university sub-dean referred him to the university psychologist. Vitkovic shared depressive and suicidal thoughts with the psychologist before later recanting them at the next session and skipping the third. He then voluntarily discontinued his university course in early 1987.

== Shooting ==
On 8 December 1987 at around 4:20 p.m., Vitkovic entered the building at 191 Queen Street, Melbourne, carrying a sawn-off M1 carbine in a brown paper bag. Vitkovic went to the 5th floor office of the Telecom Employees Credit Co-operative where a former friend (and the primary target), Con Margelis, worked. Margelis was called to the counter and briefly spoke with Vitkovic, who then presented his weapon from the bag. The weapon jammed, and Margelis ducked behind a counter; Vitkovic then began shooting, killing a young female office worker, Judith Morris. A robbery alarm was activated by a staff member at 4:22 p.m. Margelis escaped the office unharmed, and hid in the women's restroom. Vitkovic took an elevator to the 12th floor, to the Australia Post philately security section. There, Vitkovic shot and injured a man and a woman, then pointed his gun at a woman sitting at her desk, only to pan his aim to the left and shoot Julie McBean and Nancy Avignone dead. A man in the corner office on that level, Warren Spencer, was also killed.

Vitkovic then ran down the stairs to level 11, shooting indiscriminately. He went into the computer training centre, shooting Michael McGuire at point-blank range, killing him. He then went to the north-east corner of the office floor, cornering several office workers at their desks. Marianne Van Ewyk, Catherine Dowling, and Rodney Brown were fatally shot in that area, some while hiding under their desks. Three other workers were wounded there. Several victims were shot in the head at very close range as they attempted to hide. A male office worker, Donald McElroy (who had been shot once), and Tony Gioia tackled Vitkovic, while Frank Carmody, who had been shot several times, ripped the rifle out of his possession. Gioia and Carmody were later awarded Australia's second-highest bravery decoration, the Star of Courage. A wounded female worker, Rosemary Spiteri, took the rifle and hid it in a refrigerator.

Vitkovic climbed through an open window, apparently trying to clamber onto an external ledge of the building. Gioia held him by the ankles, trying to prevent his escape. Vitkovic broke free and fell to his death on the pavement 11 stories below.

No one died in the building's elevators, and Vitkovic did not shoot at police or into the street. One bullet pierced a window on the 11th floor. It was believed that around 1,000 people were in the building at the time of the shootings. After the killer's fall, police and members of the special operations group searched the building for accomplices.

Vitkovic had fallen at 4:27 p.m.; police started their search of the building at 4:30 p.m. At 5:00 p.m., the Special Operations Group confirmed that the dead man on the street was indeed Vitkovic, and the all clear was given for ambulance crew to enter the building to attend to the injured.

=== Aftermath ===
A search of Vitkovic's room after the killings revealed that Vitkovic kept press clippings of the Clifton Hill massacre, with extracts underlined in red. Police believed he had always intended to shoot people in the Queen Street building. It was reported that Vitkovic had left a note at his home; police indicated that it was not a suicide note. Vitkovic had obtained a shooter's permit and had purchased the gun a few weeks before the shooting. He had illegally modified the .30 M1 carbine, by reducing the barrel's length. It was loaded with jacketed ammunition.

In the note, addressed to his parents and dated the day of the massacre, he wrote "Today is going to be the day. The anger in my head has got too much for me. I've got to get rid of my violent impulses. The time has come to die. There is no other way out." The note had not been read by his parents before it was discovered by police.

Vitkovic had obtained his shooting permit on 17 September 1987. When asked at that time why he wanted such a permit, Vitkovic stated "I desire to go hunting". He purchased the rifle on lay-by, collecting it 21 October 1987. Before the shooting, Vitkovic had removed the barrel and the handle of the weapon.

After the shooting, a neighbourhood friend of the family said that Vitkovic was an excellent student, a good tennis player, friendly and helpful, over six feet tall and very good looking. He had been a promising tennis player, but his career was derailed due to a knee injury.

After the shooting, a rumour circulated that he had sought help from Melbourne University counselling service on the day of the shooting. The head of law at the university, Susie Nixon, later told The Age that while Vitkovic had once sought counselling during his career with the law school, reports that he had been at the university on the date of the shooting were "totally unfounded". He had not left his course with hostility and Nixon believed there was no direct link between the shooting and his "deferral" from his course. A former secretary of the club where Vitkovic played tennis said he often threw on-court tantrums and did not easily accept losses. He had won a singles championship in his first year at the club but left the next year after he lost the title.

== Coronial enquiry ==
The coronial enquiry in September 1988 heard that there was chaos during and immediately after the shooting and there was uncertainty over which of the police officers present was in charge. When the ambulance crew entered the building with police, the police shouted to announce their presence as lifts arrived at their destination. Police on the floor also called out and pointed their guns in the direction of the lift. According to Inspector Adrian Fyfe, the officer in charge at the scene, the first police officer on the scene, a traffic policeman, had acted appropriately. He had used his initiative to isolate the area and had made an accurate assessment of the situation. Fyfe criticised this officer's "appalling" lack of knowledge of "police command structure" for not realising who was in charge until 5:00 p.m., 40 minutes after his arrival. Fyfe said the radio call sign he used identified him as the officer in charge.

Con Margelis testified to the coronial enquiry that he and Vitkovic had been friends for several years. Margelis said after Vitkovic arrived to see him on 8 December, he pulled out his rifle, tried to pull the trigger and then aimed it at a female colleague and told her not to move. Knowing that Vitkovic could not move quickly due to a bad knee, Margelis jumped over the counter and hid in the women's toilets on the 5th floor. Margelis said he expected that Vitkovic would come after him, leaving others in the office safe. Of possible reasons for Vitkovic's actions, Margelis said he had not seen Vitkovic in the months prior, adding that "I can't really explain". Margelis said Vitkovic had become depressed and embittered after injuring his leg playing tennis, followed by a failed operation to repair the damage. Margelis said he began to see little of Vitkovic due to his depression.

Another employee in the 5th floor office said that their colleague Judith Morris was shot as Margelis attempted to leap over the counter: "He was after Con and Judy was in the way." This witness described Vitkovic's eyes as being those of someone "completely insane" and his laugh as "sick" and not human, adding that he laughed after shooting Morris.

Officer worker Tony Gioia told the inquest he tackled Vitkovic, having just witnessed a co-worker being shot dead at point-blank range. Gioia believed he would be the next victim once Vitkovic turned around and saw him. Gioia said during the scuffle, Vitkovic lunged for the window and struggled to get out, until he was hanging from the ledge with Gioia holding Vitkovic by the ankles. Despite others helping to restrain Vitkovic, he broke free and fell to the street to his death. A woman in an adjacent office building told the inquest she believed she saw a man in a blue jumper throw the man onto the balcony, and then push him out when he moved back to the window. Under cross examination, she incorrectly identified this as occurring on the building's 10th floor, not the 11th, and stated that her building was 80 metres (260 ft) from the Australia Post building.

The counsel assisting the coroner, Julian Leckie, judged that this witness was "honest but mistaken". He said that photographs showed Gioia was not wearing a blue sweater on the day. Evidence showed that Vitkovic tried to jump and others tried to prevent this.

The psychologist in charge of the team counselling workers and their families said the video of Vitkovic shooting his gun on the 5th floor should not be made public as it would cause significant distress to those being counselled. He advised against publishing a still image of Vitkovic taken from the video. Media outlets had requested copies of the video. The coroner, Hal Hallenstein, said the material presented at the inquest was public and had to be presented in a public way. A pathologist told the inquest that he found no legal or illegal drugs or alcohol in Vitkovic's system. He also said that Vitkovic was killed instantly from multiple injuries consistent with falling from a great height.

The contents of Vitkovic's diary were read to the inquest on its 12th day. The diary included apologies to his family for his planned actions, and a suicide note. Among his comments to his sister, he wrote "It's time for me to die. Life is just not worth living." The final diary entry, written on the day of the shooting, read "Today I must do it, there is no other way out." Earlier entries catalogued his sexual problems. Vitkovic linked those to an incident when he was eight years old and was forced to undress in a school locker room and friends made fun of his uncircumcised penis. "After this nudity was a dirty word for me ... Since the age of 12 I knew that normal sex was not possible for me and I avoided girls completely until I was 19." In another entry, he wrote "I am the odd man out there's no doubting it"; less than a month before the shooting he wrote: "As Rambo said in First Blood, once you accept a problem, it's no longer there."

At the coroner's hearing on 4 October 1988, Joe Dickson, counsel assisting the court, said that the police response was "satisfactory, and no complaints could be made about it." He said that police response was fast, and the decision not to send ambulance officers into the building until it was cleared was responsible, noting that no one died because of any delay. He said the police officer who sent people back into the building truly believed he advised them to go to the top floor, despite evidence that he did not. The hearing heard that while three of the people sent back into the building had emotional trauma, no person sent back died or was injured. Dickson conceded that the senior constable who sent people back into the building might not have taken the best course of action.

Dickson said a routine practice on the 12th floor where staff had to open a security door to talk to visitors rendered its security measures ineffective. He said the 5th floor Telecom Credit Union security measures were "adequate for all purposes except the visit of a maniac." On the 11th floor, no one could have perceived the possibility of a robbery or violence. Dickson said Vitkovic's visit to the Melbourne University counsellor in December 1986 could not be seen to have contributed to the killings. He said that Vitkovic probably brooded over the results of a Church of Scientology personality test given to him on 8 October 1987.

The results of the Scientology test showed he "had hit rock bottom"; the person administering the test did not advise Vitkovic to see a psychiatrist but to enrol in a Scientology course. Forensic psychologist Dr Alan Bartholomew told the coroner's court that Vitkovic would have been eligible at the time to be certified insane under the Mental Health Act. After studying Vitkovic's diaries, Bartholomew concluded he was a paranoid schizophrenic and that there was no doubt the personality test worsened his depression and might have contributed to the decline in his mental state. Batholomew agreed that Vitkovic was criminally insane at the time of the shooting and said Vitkovic could have identified with Rambo and the Hoddle Street killings.

After hearing representations by counsel representing the building tenants directly affected, the families of those killed, and news media organisations, the coroner Hal Hallenstein refused to suppress publication of photographs taken from a 5th-floor security video that showed Vitkovic. He said those images would be made public at the end of the inquest.

== Victims ==
- Judith Anne Morris, 19
- Julie Faye McBean, 20
- Annunziata "Nancy" Avignone, 18
- Warren David Spencer, 29
- Michael Francis McGuire, 38
- Marianne Jacoba Van Ewyk, 38
- Catherine Mary Dowling, 28
- Rodney Gerard Brown, 32

All victims died of gunshot wounds.

Brown was still alive when police arrived on the scene but later died. The doctor who performed several of the autopsies told the inquest that even had Brown been taken to a neurological unit within 15 minutes of being shot, his chances for survival would have been "very slight".

Tony Gioia and Frank Carmody were awarded the "Star of Courage" for conspicuous bravery. Clare Chalkley and Donald McElroy received commendations for bravery.

Many survivors suffered posttraumatic stress.

== See also ==
- List of mass shootings in Australia
- Going postal
- List of massacres in Australia
- List of disasters in Australia by death toll
- Port Arthur massacre (Australia)
- Crime in Australia
- Timeline of major crimes in Australia
