= 1993 Cangai siege =

Australian mass murder

Cangai (Australia)

In March 1993 murderers Leonard Leabeater, Robert Steele and Raymond Bassett went on a nine-day rampage across Queensland and New South Wales, resulting in their taking hostages in a siege in a farmhouse at Hanging Rock Station, Cangai, near Grafton, New South Wales, and threatening to kill people indiscriminately. The trio had boasted about having killed five people in a two-state murder spree.

The murderous trio kidnapped four children: Lorraine, Trevor, Tonia, and Robert Lasserre, but Lorraine and Robert were left by the side of the road unharmed. At the end of a siege where Trevor and Tonia were held hostage, they were released unharmed.

While on the run for five days, the trio murdered five people after kidnapping the children.

During the 26-hour siege, numerous shots were fired by the trio at NSW Police Tactical Operations Unit officers.

Leabeater shot and killed himself the following day, while Steele and Bassett surrendered to police. Steele was later sentenced to five consecutive life sentences plus 25 years without parole; he hanged himself in his cell in Goulburn Jail on 23 December 1994.

Bassett was sentenced to 14 years imprisonment for being an accessory to the NSW murders, and consecutive sentences of life imprisonment for the Queensland murders, with the Queensland sentencing judge ordering him to serve a total non-parole period of 34 years.

The siege is also infamous for the actions of news reporters Mike Willesee, who was heavily criticised for telephoning the gunman and speaking with the children being held hostage whilst live on air and Mike Munro, who with his news crew landed a helicopter near the homestead. It was thought that there was a "No-Fly Zone" in the area. This was not the case as District Court Judge B.R Gallen determined during a trial in which the helicopter pilot was defending the charge of flying in a dangerous manner. These actions were satirised in a 1994 episode of Frontline.

In the judgement, Judge Gallen said:

"There is no suggestion that Mr Davidson entered an area which he was not lawfully entitled to enter while flying his aircraft."

In addressing the court and the 12 person jury, Judge Gallen questioned:

"Whether you could accept the evidence given by the police officers." (in the police helicopter).

In his summary, Judge Gallen made it clear that the helicopter pilot for Channel Nine did not fly in a dangerous manner. In respect of the police officers, Judge Gallen said:

"you would not have been impressed by the way they were evasive and the way in which they appeared to be ill at ease and particularly so the Senior Constable Lestor who was the pilot".

The jury found that Davidson was not guilty of flying in a dangerous manner.

The siege is also described at length by ex-Tactical Operations Unit officer William Dodson in his book, The Sharp End.

== See also ==
- Timeline of major crimes in Australia
- Crime in Australia
