= Hoddle Street massacre =

Mass shooting in Melbourne, Victoria, Australia

- Hoddle Street massacre (Melbourne) Hoddle Street massacre (Australia)
- Location: 37°47′24″S 144°59′42″E; Clifton Hill, Victoria, Australia
- Date: 9 August 1987; 39 years ago 9:29 pm – 10:14 pm (UTC+10)
- Target: Civilians, police and passing-by cars in Hoddle Street
- Attack type: Mass murder, massacre
- Weapons: Ruger 10/22 semi-automatic rifle (.22 LR); Mossberg 500 pump-action shotgun (12-gauge); Norinco M14 semi-automatic rifle (7.62×51mm)
- Deaths: 7
- Injuries: 19
- Perpetrator: Julian Knight
- Motive: Unknown

The Hoddle Street massacre was a mass shooting that occurred on the evening of Sunday, 9 August 1987, in Hoddle Street, Clifton Hill, a suburb of Melbourne, Victoria, in Australia. The shootings resulted in the deaths of seven people, and serious injury to 19 others. After a police chase lasting more than 30 minutes, 19-year-old former Australian Army officer cadet Julian Knight was caught in nearby Fitzroy North and arrested for the shootings.

Knight was later sentenced to seven concurrent sentences of life imprisonment with a non-parole period of 27 years for what was described by the presiding judge as "one of the bloodiest massacres in Australian history". The Crown prosecutor, Joe Dickson QC, "did not contend that a minimum term should not be fixed". Knight was imprisoned in the maximum security Port Phillip Prison in Truganina near Melbourne and was eligible for parole in 2014. Shortly before Knight became eligible for parole, the Victorian Government amended the Corrections Act 1986 to prevent the parole board from ordering Knight's release on parole "unless satisfied, amongst other things, that Mr Knight is in imminent danger of dying or is seriously incapacitated and that, as a result, he no longer has the physical ability to do harm to any person".

== Background ==
Knight's father was involved in the military and as a result, Knight moved around frequently as a child. His lifelong dream was to defend Australia in a war. After a troubled high-school life at Westbourne Grammar School, Knight entered the Royal Military College, Duntroon in Canberra, Australian Capital Territory on 13 January 1987 at the age of 18. While a military career had long been a dream, he lacked self-discipline and performed poorly at his studies and only gained good results in weapons expertise exercises. Knight did not like authority and he hated the social hierarchy of the army which allowed people only a few months older than him to boss him around. One night, despite being confined to the base, Knight was involved in a fight and stabbing at a bar after being confronted by a senior. Knight was consequently discharged and sent back to Melbourne 16 days prior to the massacre. Upon returning to Melbourne, Knight found out that his longtime girlfriend would no longer see him and his mother, on whom he had always relied, had turned his childhood bedroom into an extra living room. Furthermore, Knight had no money and no ability or experience to earn a decent wage.

== Events of 9 August 1987 ==
The events of this day were pieced together after investigation by police, along with the help of Knight himself.

=== Prelude ===
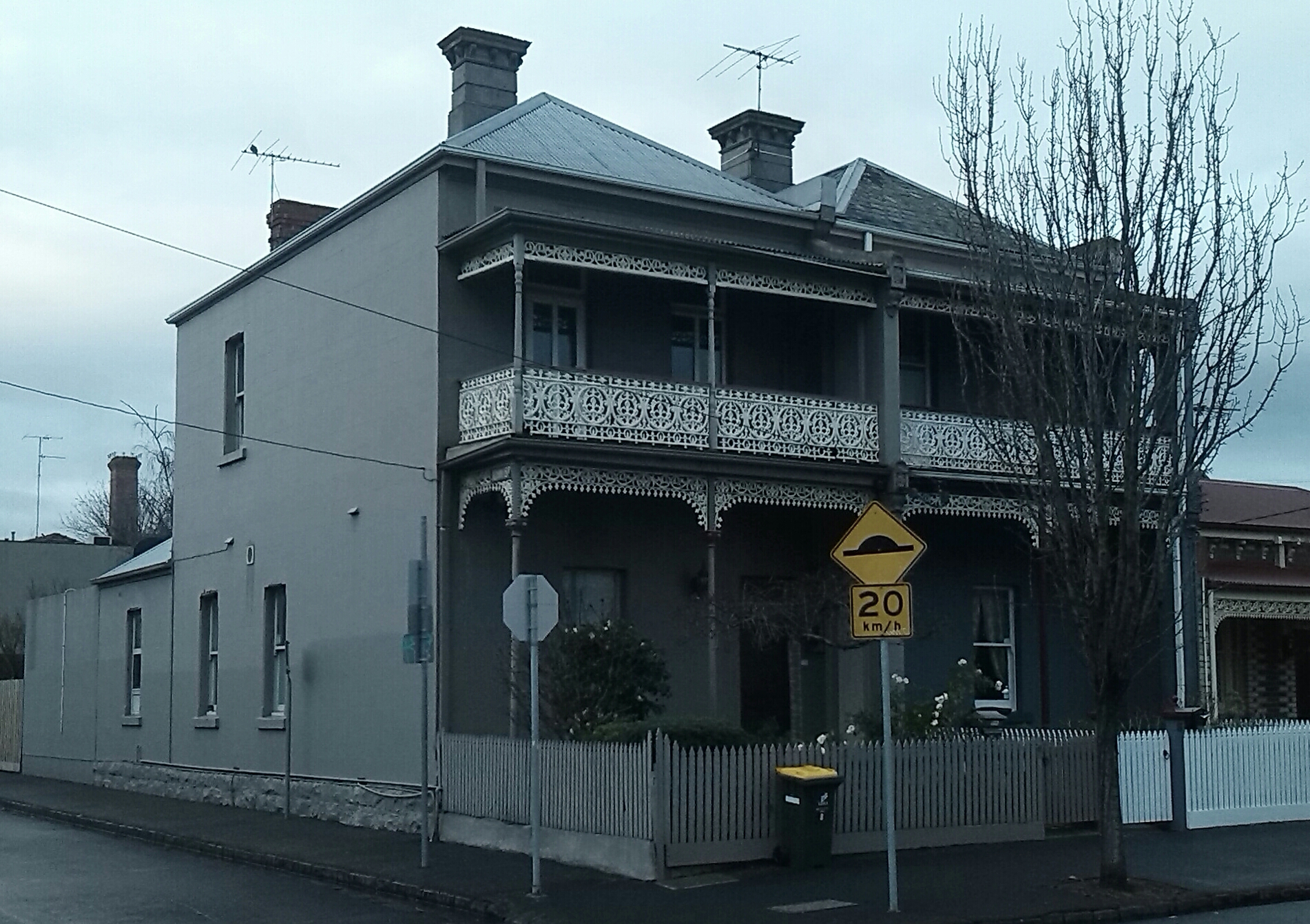
The house in Ramsden Street, Clifton Hill

At 11:30 on Sunday 9 August 1987, Knight woke up in his temporary bedroom in the front room of his mother's house at number 6 Ramsden Street, Clifton Hill. Between 13:10 and 16:10 on Sunday 9 August 1987, Knight attended a belated birthday party for his mother at his grandmother's house in the Melbourne suburb of Hawthorn. While at the party Knight consumed two cans of beer. He left the party in his own car and drove his younger sister home before driving aimlessly around the Clifton Hill area.

At about 16:50, Knight went to see an old girlfriend in Clifton Hill in order to give her a magazine. He only stayed at her flat for about five minutes then he continued to drive aimlessly around the area. Minutes later the gearbox of his car – his only asset – jammed and stuck in second gear. He limped the car home, where he changed clothes and drank another can of beer before walking angrily around to the nearby Royal Hotel, his local pub, at around 17:30. None of Knight's friends were there, so he drank alone from around 17:30. At around 20:50, Knight reportedly began to feel the effects of the beer he'd been drinking and he had a "vision" of soldiers being ambushed. He felt as if it was a "call to arms", and at about 20:55 he rushed from the hotel and ran back to his mother's house.

=== Preparation ===
Arriving back at his mother's house a few minutes later, he spoke briefly to his sister when she met him in the hallway outside the front room. He then waited until his sister returned to the rear of the house to watch a movie on TV with their mother, before he ventured upstairs to his mother's bedroom. Stored under her bed were his legally owned and licensed weapons: a .177 calibre Daisy BB air rifle, a .177 calibre Chinese air rifle, a .177 calibre Crosman model 766 air rifle, a .22 calibre Ruger model 10/22 semi-automatic rifle, a 12-gauge Mossberg pump-action shotgun, and a Chinese-made 7.62mm calibre M14 semi-automatic military rifle. Knight retrieved the Ruger rifle, the Mossberg shotgun and the M14 rifle, then he took the Ruger and the Mossberg back downstairs to the front room. He then returned to his mother's room and collected the M14, and a steel ammunition box and a leather shotgun cartridge belt from his mother's wardrobe, before returning to the front room to load the three firearms.

After loading the firearms and stuffing his pockets with around 100 rounds of ammunition, including a "suicide" 7.62mm round which he placed in the front right hand pocket of his jeans, he placed a black combat knife down the back of his jeans. He then slung the M14 over his back and picked up the Mossberg and the Ruger in his right and left hands respectively. Immediately afterwards, at around 21:30, he opened the front door of the house and ran out into Ramsden Street. After running west along Ramsden Street and crossing the nearby railway line, Knight reached the eastern side of the main four-lane arterial road known as Hoddle Street.

=== Shooting spree ===
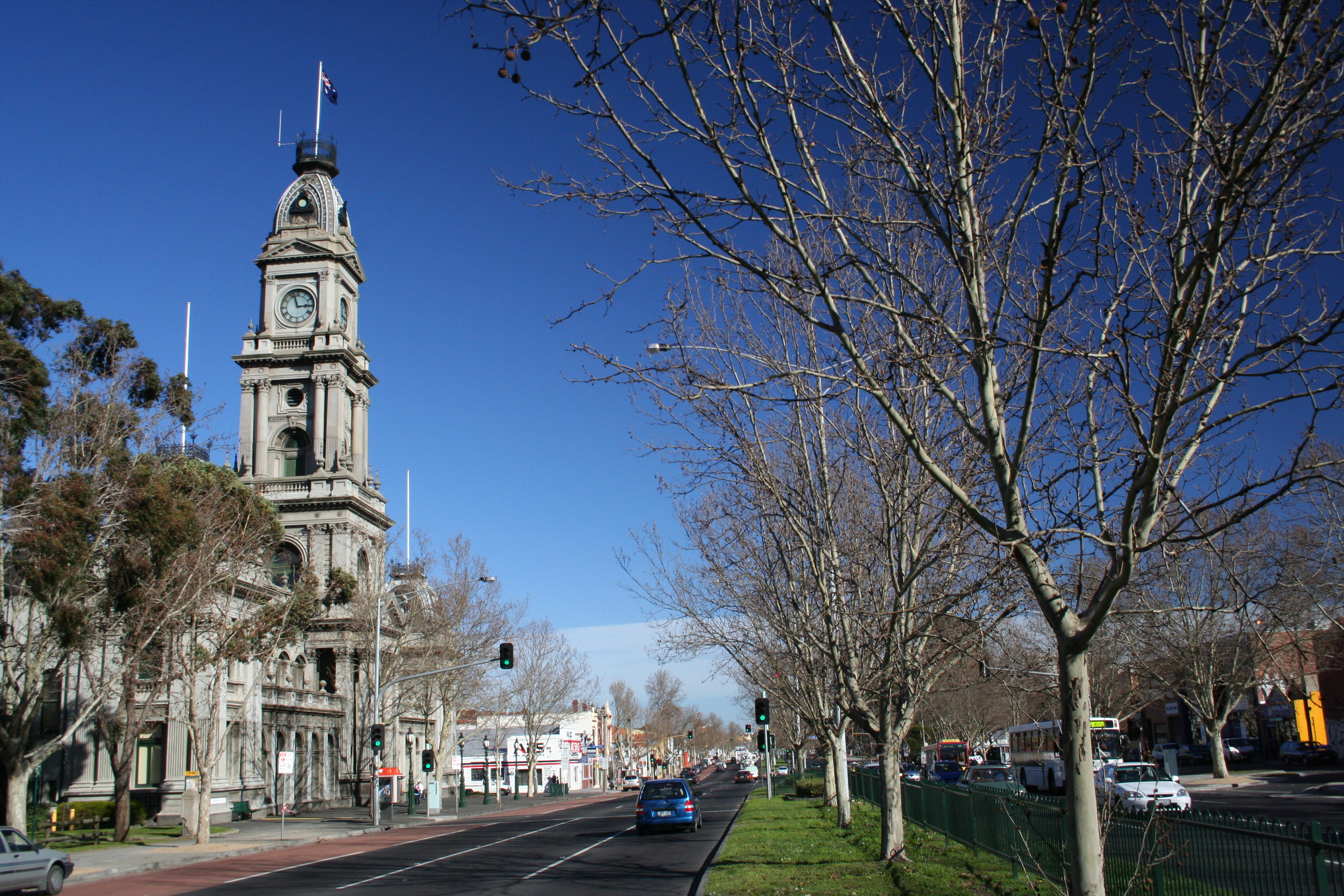
Hoddle Street, where a majority of the shootings took place

At 21:30 from the nature strip on the east side of the road, Knight commenced firing on passing cars with the Ruger rifle. The first car that Knight opened fire on contained a married couple, Con and Rita Vitkos. Rita received minor wounds and her husband drove on before stopping at a Mobil service station about 150 metres further south down Hoddle Street. Following the Vitkos's was a car containing Michael Anthony and Trevor Smeelie, and a car driven by Gregory Elliott. A bullet struck Elliott's vehicle, narrowly missing his head. Both of these cars were damaged, but none of the occupants were wounded. Following Gregory Elliott's car was a vehicle driven by Alan Jury and containing Monica Vitelli and Dannielle Mina. Jury and Vitelli were both wounded, and they joined the others at the Mobil service station.

Knight fired rapid bursts at each car, and he reloaded with spare 10-round Ruger magazines as he moved north along the nature-strip towards the nearby Clifton Hill railway station. He ensured that he fired on every south and north-bound vehicle as it passed him. The next car he fired on contained Raewyn Crighton, Bernd Micheel and Dianne Arnold, who all escaped injury. The following car was driven by Sand Wang, who received minor wounds. The next car was driven by Diane Fitzpatrick, who received a serious back wound. The next three cars to be shot at contained Michael Pearce and Jacqueline Langosch, Issac Lohman, and Reginald Dutton and Dana Sabolcki respectively, and they all escaped injury.

At around 21:35, Knight ran out of ammunition for the Ruger, so he dropped it on the nature-strip and commenced firing with the Mossberg shotgun. The loud blasts of the shotgun alerted local residents to the shooting and the first calls were made to the Victoria Police's emergency communications centre, D24. The first car to be hit was driven by Sharyn Maunder, who did not receive any injuries and did not realise the front of her car had been hit. The next car to be hit was driven by Vesna Markovska, who received minor wounds, followed by a car driven by her fiancé, Zoran Trajceski, who also received minor wounds. Both Markovska and Trajceski parked their cars by the side of the road and got out to take cover. As they did so, a car driven by Georgina Papaioannou stopped on the opposite side of the street. Knight immediately opened fire on her car, and Papaioannou was slightly wounded. Soon afterwards, a car driven by Jayne Morris, alongside Kay Edwards and Cecilie Corless, drove south through the ambush zone.

=== Police response ===
Further south down Hoddle Street they flagged down a police divisional van containing Constables Glen Nichols and Belinda Bourchier, and informed them about the shootings. Nichols and Bourchier immediately drove to the scene with their lights and siren on as they radioed the police headquarters (colloquially known as D24). Soon after 21:38, they reached the intersection of Hoddle Street and Ramsden Street where they were shot at by Knight. Knight continued to change position as he fired at a procession of four single-occupant cars which, in chronological order, were driven by Mathew Morrow, Edward McShortall, Trevor Robinson and Keith Wing Shing. McShortall received minor wounds, but Wing Shing, who stopped his car opposite Knight, received serious jaw and throat wounds. Knight continued to reload and change position as he continued to fire at the passing cars.

The next car Knight fired at was a car containing Kevin Skinner, his wife Tracey and their son Adam. Tracey was killed instantly by a bullet to the face and Adam, who was on her lap below the window sill, received minor glass wounds. Following this, a local resident, Peter Curmi, and a friend of his, John Muscat, approached the scene from the western side of the street. Knight fired one shot at them which fatally wounded Muscat in the head and chest, and which seriously wounded Curmi. Immediately after this, the attendant at the nearby swimming pool, Steve Wight, ran to their aid and was seriously wounded by Knight's final shotgun blast. It was now 21:39, and numerous police units were rushing to the scene. Knight dropped the empty Mossberg shotgun and took up a prone firing position with his M14 rifle. At this point, Vesna Markovska broke cover from behind her car and made for the footpath on the eastern side of Hoddle Street. As she stepped onto the footpath she was spotted by Knight who fired a shot which seriously wounded her. When she fell back onto the roadway Knight fired two further shots which killed her.

It was now 21:40 and D24 notified the Police Air Wing that one of their Aerospatiale Dauphin police helicopters was needed to assist the police at the scene. Moments later, in a break in the firing, one of the police officers on the western side of Hoddle Street fired a shot at Knight, which missed him by a couple of metres. Immediately following this shot Robert Mitchell, who had driven through the ambush zone unscathed and parked his car further down Hoddle Street, ran up the eastern side of the street in an attempt to render assistance to the fallen Markovska. As he reached her and came to a halt, Knight quickly fired a shot at him which hit him in the right side of the head and killed him instantly.

At 21:41, as three police units took up positions in Mayors Park on the western side of Hoddle Street and other police units took up positions in the surrounding area, Knight opened fire on a car driven by Jacqueline Turner and on Papaioannou as she walked from her car to help Markovska and Mitchell. Turner's car was not hit, but Papaioannou was fatally wounded in the left side as she reached Markovska. Following this, Knight fired on a car driven by John Finn who received minor wounds. The next car Knight shot at was driven by Andrew Hack who was seriously wounded in the left side. Following Hack was a car driven by Dusan Flajnik which Knight fired at. Flajnik was hit in the left side and bled to death in his car. At 21:43, Constable Bourchier requested another ambulance from D24 and nominated the Mobil service station as a safe rendezvous point for ambulances as two more police units arrived there.

The next car to be shot at contained Michael Smith and Jacqueline Megens. Smith received minor wounds while Megens was seriously wounded in the shoulder. As they were fired upon the first two ambulances arrived at the scene; one at the Mobil service station and one at Mayors Park. It was now 21:44, and the next car to be shot at was driven by Steven Mihailidis who escaped unscathed. Immediately afterwards Knight fired at the rider of a motorcycle, Kenneth "Shane" Stanton, who was hit in the left leg and fell onto the roadway. As he lay there Knight shot him a further two times and he eventually died. Soon afterwards, at 21:45, a car containing Dimitrios Collyvas, Renata Coldebella, Danny Coldebella and Danny De Luca, followed Stanton down Hoddle Street. Knight, who was by this time beside the southern end of the Clifton Hill railway station buildings, fired a shot at the front of the car. The car stopped and as it reversed back up the street Knight fired two more shots at it before it crashed into a police car, driven by Constable Dominic Cannizzaro, which had just arrived at the scene.

The first shot that Knight had fired into the car had slightly wounded Renata, and the second shot he fired had seriously wounded Danny Coldebella. As Collyvas's car was reversing a motorcycle being ridden by Wayne Timms and Jayne Timbury, followed by a car containing Alexandra Stamatopoulos, Steven Stamatopoulos, Irene Fountis, Vicki Fountis and Panagioti Fountis, drove into the ambush zone and stopped opposite Collyvas's car. At this point Knight, who was surrounded by at least 40 armed police officers, decided to withdraw from the area and began "hunting" police officers. It was just after 21:45, and he'd expended 40 rounds of .22 calibre bullets, 25 rounds of 12-gauge buckshot and 32 rounds of 7.62mm calibre bullets in the preceding 15 minutes. Five people lay dead, two were fatally wounded and a further 17 had been wounded. In addition to the expended ammunition, Knight had lost his "suicide" bullet and another 7.62mm bullet as he had moved up the nature-strip. Knight had also lost his knife on the nature-strip. He only had his M14 rifle and 17 rounds of ammunition, having discarded the other two firearms.

=== Police chase ===
Following his decision to withdraw, Knight turned around and climbed onto the western platform of the Clifton Hill railway station. He ran north along the platform and then continued moving north beside the railway line. He reached a fork in the tracks at around 21:46, and decided to follow the left fork. He spotted a police car in the northern end of Hoddle Street and fired three shots at it. The police car contained Sergeant Graham Larchin and Senior Constable Betty Roberts, who were not injured by the gunfire but who abandoned the car after Knight ceased firing. After firing at Larchin and Roberts's police car Knight moved into a nearby cluster of trees, sat down and smoked a cigarette. Minutes later, police Aerospatiale Dauphin helicopter VH-PVA – call sign "Air 495" – arrived over the Clifton Hill area and began searching for Knight with a powerful searchlight. A minute later D24 ordered the Victoria Police's elite Special Operations Group (SOG) to attend the scene.

Knight finished his cigarette and continued moving in a north-west direction towards Northcote. He crossed over the Merri Creek, which bordered Clifton Hill and Northcote, and took up a position at the end of a road bridge which spanned the creek. Just before 22:00, he fired a shot at a passing police officer, Constable Colin Chambers, who was slightly wounded in the right side. After shooting Chambers, Knight moved back across Merri Creek into the adjoining suburb of Fitzroy North. The police helicopter had found him in its searchlight and was following him. He ran into a line of trees beside the railway line in an attempt to avoid the searchlight, but at 22:05 broke cover onto the railway line, knelt down and fired three shots at the aircraft as it circled over him. The police helicopter, containing Senior Constable Trevor Wilson, Senior Constable Darryl Jones, Constable Keith Stewart, and Ambulance Officer Alan Scott, was hit by the first shot which pierced its right main fuel tank and forced it to make an emergency landing on a nearby sports field.

=== McKean Street and arrest ===
Knight continued on into Fitzroy North and headed down McKean Street in an attempt to reach his ex-girlfriend's house. It was now 22:13 and Knight was spotted by two police officers, Constable John Delahunty and Constable Ralph Lockman, who gave chase in their police car. As they bore down on him, Knight ducked into a lane-way, turned around and fired his last ten rounds at the police car as it stopped in the middle of the road facing the lane-way. Delahunty, who was driving the police car, received minor shrapnel wounds to the face and left hand as he and Lockman tumbled out of the car with their revolvers drawn. The police car's headlights were on high beam facing the entrance to the laneway, which was also lit up by a nearby street light. As Delahunty and Lockman took up positions behind their police car and called upon Knight to surrender, Knight squatted down beside a low brick wall and searched his pockets vainly for his "suicide" bullet. When he realised that he had lost it he leaned out into the headlight beams and dropped the empty M14 on the ground. He then slowly stood up with his hands in the air.

When he was fully upright, Delahunty stepped out from behind the rear of the police car and fired a shot at him. Knight was not hit but he ducked back down behind the low brick wall. As Delahunty and Lockman again called on him to surrender he yelled back "Don't shoot! I'm coming out!" He again rose up with his hands in the air before walking out onto the street where he was arrested by Delahunty and Lockman. Numerous other police officers arrived at the arrest scene, and after a short, initially violent, interrogation (by officers wanting to know where his accomplices were), Knight was driven in an unmarked police car to the St Kilda Road Police Complex by Detective Senior Constable Richard McIntosh, Detective Senior Constable Kim Cox and Constable Robert Kovacs. At the St Kilda Road Police Complex Knight was interrogated extensively by McIntosh and Cox, briefly by the then head of the Homicide Squad, Detective Chief Inspector Brendon Cole, then extensively by Homicide Squad detectives Detective Senior Sergeant Brian McCarthy and Detective Senior Constable Graham Kent. Knight also took part in a night-time crime re-enactment and a daytime crime re-enactment, both of which were videoed, and he was interrogated until he was eventually charged with the murder of John Muscat.

== Victims ==
The victims in the massacre:

- Fatalities

- Tracey Skinner (23). Shot in face
- Johnny "John" Muscat (26). Shot in face and chest
- Vesna Markovska (24). Shot three times
- Robert Mitchell (27). Shot in right side of the head
- Georgina "Gina" Papaioannou (21). Minor wounds, later shot in the left side
- Dusan Flajnik (53). Shot in the left side. Bled to death
- Kenneth "Shane" Stanton (21). Leg injury, then shot twice

- Injuries

- Con Vitkos. Minor wounds
- Rita Vitkos. Minor wounds
- Alan Jury. Wounded
- Monica Vitelli. Wounded
- Diane Fitzpatrick. Serious back injury
- Zoran Trajceski. Minor wounds
- Edward McShortall. Minor wounds
- Keith Wing Shing. Serious jaw and throat wounds
- Adam Skinner. Minor glass injuries
- Peter Curmi. Seriously wounded
- Steven Wight. Seriously wounded
- John Finn. Minor wounds
- Andrew Hack. Seriously wounded in left side
- Michael Smith. Minor wounds
- Jacqueline Megens. Seriously wounded in right shoulder
- Renata Coldebella. Minor wounds
- Danny Coldebella. Seriously wounded
- Colin Chambers. Slightly injured in right side
- John Delahunty. Minor shrapnel wounds to face and left hand

== Media ==
The Hoddle Street massacre has been the subject of GTV Channel 9's Hoddle Street (2007). In 2018, the incident was the subject of the 90th episode of the true crime podcast Casefile.

Media attention on the massacre has been cited as a possible motive for a killing spree in Hungerford, UK 10 days later.

The massacre forms the background of the second episode of Series 2 of the Australian drama series The Newsreader, broadcast on ABC on 17 September 2023.

== See also ==
- List of mass shootings in Australia
- Queen Street massacre – a spree shooting in Melbourne in December 1987
- Milperra massacre
- Port Arthur massacre
- List of massacres in Australia
- List of disasters in Australia by death toll
