= Hope Forest shooting =

Familicide in Hope Forest, South Australia

- Location: Hope Forest, South Australia, Australia
- Date: 6 September 1971; 1:00 p.m. (Note: The Age news report cited has 1 p.m., which may be a typographical error)
- Attack type: Familicide, mass shooting
- Weapons: .22-caliber Gecado 752A single-shot bolt-action rifle; Mallet
- Deaths: 10
- Perpetrator: Clifford Cecil Bartholomew

The Hope Forest shooting was a familicide in Hope Forest (then part of the District Council of Strathalbyn), South Australia, Australia on 6 September 1971, in which Clifford Bartholomew shot dead his wife, their seven children, his wife's sister-in-law and her son with a .22-caliber rifle. It was at the time the deadliest mass shooting on Australian soil, being surpassed by the Port Arthur massacre 25 years later. It remains the deadliest familicide in Australia's history and the country's third-deadliest mass shooting, behind the Port Arthur massacre and the Bondi Beach shooting in 2025.

== Background ==
Hope Forest is a locality 40 kilometres (25 mi) south of Adelaide, near Willunga, which was first settled in the 1930s. Clifford Cecil Bartholomew, a 40-year-old truck driver, (Note: Bartholomew had recently lost his truck-driving job and was now working nightshift at an abattoir.) lived in a seven-room rented farmhouse with his wife and seven children. Heather's sister-in-law Winnis Mary Keane and her two-year-old son Daniel were holidaying with them at the time.

== Incident ==
List of deaths

  - Heather Alice Bartholomew, 40
  - Neville Kenneth Bartholomew, 19
  - Christine Heather Bartholomew, 17
  - Sharon Anne Bartholomew, 15
  - Helen Joy Bartholomew, 13
  - Gregory Kym Bartholomew, 10
  - Roger Clifford Bartholomew, 7
  - Sandra June Bartholomew, 4
  - Winnis Mary Keane, 23
  - Daniel Brian Sean Keane, 2

The killings occurred on early Monday morning, the day after Father's Day. All of the victims were initially asleep up to the time of the shooting. Bartholomew struck his wife in the head with a mallet, then shot her in the head with his .22-caliber rifle when she wouldn't stop screaming. His other victims were shot in the head as well, some being first hit with a mallet in order to subdue them. Three of the children awoke and tried to escape, however they were shot in the hallway. Keane tried to flee the farmhouse but Bartholomew shot her in the back of the head before she could escape. He also murdered her 2 year old son.

== Aftermath ==
Bartholomew was arrested at 8pm and was charged for the murder of his wife. Bartholomew explained that he had relationship problems with his wife, Heather, suspecting her of having an affair with another man. At trial, he pleaded guilty and was initially sentenced to death. The serving judge, Justice Roma Mitchell, imposed the sentence of death by hanging (the only sentence she could impose) but this was later changed to a life sentence due to legal changes.

After being regarded as a model prisoner, he was released on parole after serving eight years. He changed his name to Clifford Palmer, remarried, and raised a family of seven stepchildren, who had no knowledge of his crimes. The family never learned about his actions until years after his death on 27 November 2002 at the age of 72.

== See also ==
- Timeline of major crimes in Australia
