= Strathfield massacre =

1991 mass shooting in Sydney, Australia

- Wade Frankum
- Location: 33.8729°S 151.0931°E; Strathfield Plaza, Strathfield, Sydney, Australia
- Date: 17 August 1991 c. 3:30 p.m.–3:40 p.m. (GMT+10)
- Attack type: Mass shooting, massacre, mass murder, murder–suicide
- Weapons: 50 cm Bowie knife; Norinco SKS
- Deaths: 8 (including the perpetrator)
- Injuries: 6
- Perpetrator: Wade John Frankum
- Motive: Unknown

The Strathfield massacre was a shooting rampage at the Strathfield Plaza shopping centre in Strathfield, Sydney, Australia, on 17 August 1991. The shooter was Wade Frankum, who killed himself as police arrived at the scene. The incident left eight dead including the gunman and six wounded.

== Massacre ==
At around 1:00 p.m., Frankum went to Strathfield Plaza, a shopping centre in the Inner West of Sydney. He sat in a café called The Coffee Pot, where he drank four cups of coffee.

At approximately 3:30 p.m., apparently without provocation, Frankum pulled a bowie knife from an army surplus duffel bag and turned to the table behind him occupied by two teenage girls, killing 15-year-old Roberta Armstrong by repeatedly stabbing her in the back.

Leaving the knife in the body of the girl, he pulled a Chinese-made SKS semi-automatic rifle out of his duffel and shot around the café, killing five more people. He then shot the café's owner dead and fled into the main area of the centre, where he killed his last victim.

Frankum ran into the rooftop car park and held a car owner at gunpoint, demanding that she take him to Enfield, a nearby suburb. Before the woman could start her car, police began to arrive on the scene with Constable Darren Stewart the first to arrive. He was shot at in his police car by Frankum from the car park rooftop, Stewart had run through the Strathfield shopping centre to engage Frankum, but, upon arriving at the carpark rooftop, Frankum shot numerous rounds into the door leading to the carpark, pinning down Stewart. Upon hearing more approaching sirens, Frankum apologised to the woman and then got out of the car, knelt on the ground, and committed suicide by shooting himself in the head.

== Victims ==
Frankum's shooting spree lasted around 10 minutes. He killed seven people and injured six, none of them personally known to him.

Victims:

- Roberta Armstrong, age 15
- Robertson Kan Hock Voon, age 51
- Patricia Rowe, age 37
- Carole Dickinson, age 47
- Joyce Nixon, age 61
- Rachelle Milburn, age 17
- George Mavris, age 51

=== Bravery award ===
Greg Read, 41, a father of three and Vietnam veteran, was awarded the Star of Courage for saving the lives of eight people during the rampage.

== Perpetrator ==
Wade John Frankum, born 23 January 1958, worked at various occupations including as a retail assistant and a taxi driver. In the apartment where Frankum lived alone, police found a large collection of violent literature and video copies of violent films. Among them was a copy of the novel American Psycho by Bret Easton Ellis. Although there is no direct evidence that the novel had inspired Frankum, Sarah and Stephen Groenewegen write that the book is often cited in connection to the massacre. Frankum also owned a copy of Dostoevsky's Crime and Punishment. Investigators suggested that both his reading and viewing habits contributed to his motivation for the shooting.

== See also ==
- List of mass shootings in Australia
- List of massacres in Australia
- List of disasters in Australia by death toll
