= Greenough family massacre =

Australian murders

- Location: 28.906949°S 114.710593°E; Greenough, Western Australia
- Date: 22 February 1993; 3 am
- Attack type: Mass murder/Axe murder
- Weapon: Axe
- Deaths: 4
- Perpetrator: William Patrick Mitchell

The Greenough family massacre was the axe murders of Karen MacKenzie and her three children, Daniel, Amara, and Katrina, at their rural property in Greenough, Western Australia, on 22 February 1993. They were killed by farmhand William Patrick "Bill" Mitchell, an acquaintance of MacKenzie, who confessed to the crimes after he was charged with murder on 27 March. Mitchell pleaded guilty to wilful murder, indecently interfering with a corpse and sexual penetration of a child under 13, and was sentenced to strict security life imprisonment, with a non-parole period of 20 years. Details of the murders were withheld from the public as they were considered too horrific. In 1994, the Criminal Court of Appeal ordered that Mitchell not be eligible for parole and to never be released from jail, but it was overturned by the High Court on appeal in 1996. The case led to calls for the reintroduction of the death penalty.

After being incarcerated for 20 years, Mitchell became eligible for parole in 2013. The Attorney-General refused parole due to the gravity of the crime and for the safety of the community. As required by statute, he was eligible again in 2016, which was refused. In 2018, Mitchell was banned from parole consideration until 2025 after the McGowan government introduced new laws to delay parole eligibility for mass murderers for up to six years. In November 2024, the Attorney-General announced that Mitchell would not be eligible for parole until at least December 2030.

== Background ==
In the early 1990s, Karen MacKenzie and her two daughters, Amara and Katrina, moved to the Western Australian town of Greenough, where she had bought a weatherboard farmhouse on a block of land off the Brand Highway. In 1993, her son Daniel moved from Queensland to join the family; he had been raised by his maternal grandmother, Barbara Marchant, from the age of two. He enrolled in high school at Geraldton and was determined to finish year 11 and 12. Amara was enrolled in primary school at Geraldton. MacKenzie had been in a de facto relationship with the father of her two daughters, but the relationship ended.

On 19 February 1993, Karen attended a private party in Geraldton while Daniel babysat his younger sisters. She had an argument with friend William Patrick "Bill" Mitchell, a 24-year-old farmhand from Bluff Point, at the party and she had "rejected Mitchell's advances earlier that evening." He drove her home at about 5 am the next morning and stayed at the MacKenzie home until about 11 am.

== Crime ==
Mitchell had spent the evening of 21 February 1993 getting high on a mixture of cannabis, alcohol, and amphetamines. The following morning, at around 3 am, sixteen-year-old Daniel, who was still awake, heard the sound of a car approaching the MacKenzie home. His sisters and mother were all believed to be sleeping at the time. Mitchell parked the vehicle, exited and began walking towards the home. Curious as to who could be visiting at such an unusual hour, Daniel switched a kitchen light on, which Mitchell noted from outside. Daniel walked outside and attempted to greet Mitchell, not receiving any response, nor realising that the man was brandishing a tomahawk-style axe. Mitchell murdered Daniel with the axe.

Mitchell then entered the house through the back, as it did not have a front door, and found Karen MacKenzie, 31, asleep in the lounge room. He began attacking her in a similar fashion, killing her with multiple blows from the axe. He then went to Karen's bedroom and retrieved a tube of hand lotion, after which he pulled her body up into a crouching position, raped and sodomised her corpse and covered her head with a blanket. Mitchell then "brutally attacked" and sexually assaulted Amara, 7, before killing Katrina, 5. The younger two children were sleeping when they were killed and their lives ended relatively quickly. Daniel was the first victim discovered by family friends, face-down on the dirt drive, mid-morning on 22 February.

== Investigation and trial ==
Police and forensic investigators scoured the murder scene and collected evidence. A search party fanned-out in an attempt to locate any evidence or means of identifying those responsible, an effort which lasted seven days. The funeral for the four victims, which was attended by Mitchell, was held on 5 March 1993. Following a five-week investigation, Mitchell was charged with the murders on 27 March. Hand lotion used by the killer at the scene was a key piece of evidence in the investigation. Palm and fingerprints found in the MacKenzie family home were matched to those of Mitchell and chemists "conclusively linked" the oily substance found in fingertip prints to the hand lotion on Karen's body, determining them to be "chemically identical". Mitchell confessed to the crimes and took detectives step-by-step through the murder scene; a detective recalled that Mitchell "went through and methodically and clinically described everything that he had done without showing any emotion, without showing any remorse." Mitchell had disposed of the murder weapon in the Greenough River and discarded the hand lotion in a rubbish bin. Police divers recovered the tomahawk five weeks after the murders; human hair still adhering to its blade.

On 8 September 1993, Mitchell pleaded guilty to four counts of wilful murder, three counts of indecently interfering with a corpse and one count of sexual penetration of a child under 13. Mitchell was convicted of the murders on 14 October 1993 and sentenced to strict security life imprisonment, with a non-parole period of 20 years. Prior to Mitchell's sentencing, a judge ruled that the exact way in which Daniel, Amara, and Katrina were killed was to be sealed. The judge said that the crimes "almost defy description" and that Mitchell committed "sexual activity of the most depraved kind". In April 1994, the Court of Criminal Appeal ruled that Mitchell was to "never be released from jail" and lifted the order suppressing details of Mitchell's crimes, but it was overturned by the High Court on appeal in March 1996, reinstating his 20-year non-parole period.

== Incarceration and parole eligibility ==
Mitchell has been incarcerated in Bunbury Regional Prison in Western Australia since 2009, after being transferred from the maximum-security Casuarina Prison. He became eligible for parole in 2013, with a three-year review in 2016. In September 2013, Mitchell was refused parole. Attorney-General Michael Mischin stated that his decision to refuse parole was based upon the gravity of the crime and the safety of the community. MacKenzie's younger sister Evalyn Clow had met with Mischin to discuss the parole review. Clow said that the details of the crimes should finally be unsealed "to emphasise to the public why Mitchell should never be freed." She said people would be "horrified" by the details, particularly "with what he did to Amara".

Mitchell became eligible for parole again in October 2016, and was refused parole again. As required by statute, his next review by the board was due in September 2019. In 2018 due to a, at the time new, McGowan government law which delays parole consideration for mass murderers and serial killers for a period of six years, Mitchell was no longer eligible for parole in 2019.

In November 2024, Attorney-General John Quigley announced that Mitchell would not be eligible for parole for at least another six years, a decision in place until 13 December 2030. He stated: "The prospect of a mass murderer or serial killer potentially being granted parole can have a significant impact on secondary victims and the broader community. The suspension of parole consideration for mass murderers and serial killers is primarily intended to address the re-traumatisation experienced by the secondary victims of these notorious crimes."

== See also ==
- List of massacres in Australia
- Axe murder
