= Julian Knight (murderer) =

Australian mass murderer

- Julian Knight at the time of his arrest
- Born: Julian Knight; 4 March 1968 (age 58); Melbourne, Victoria, Australia
- Occupation: Former cadet at Royal Military College, Duntroon
- Motive: Military heroism
- Penalty: 7 × life imprisonment (1989); Non-parole period of 27 years (Note: Knight was eligible to apply for parole in May 2014; however, in April 2014 the Victorian Government denied his access to parole via amending legislation.)

Details
- Date: 9 August 1987; 9:29 pm–10:14 pm
- Locations: Clifton Hill, Melbourne, Victoria
- Targets: Civilians, police and passing cars in Hoddle Street
- Killed: 7
- Injured: 19
- Weapons: Ruger 10/22 (.22 LR); Mossberg 500 (12-gauge); Norinco M14 (7.62×51mm)

Julian Knight (born 4 March 1968 (Note: In a 2008 article by The Age, the authenticity of this source was questioned. It would appear that some of the content on this website now sits at julianknight.com.au; with some on the content of this (newer) website possibly fed by Knight, and published via Justice Action.)) is an Australian mass murderer. On 9 August 1987, he shot seven people dead and injured 19 during a shooting spree in Clifton Hill, an inner eastern suburb of Melbourne, in Victoria, Australia, in what became known as the Hoddle Street massacre.

On 10 November 1988, Knight pleaded guilty to seven counts of murder and 46 counts of attempted murder. He was sentenced by Justice George Hampel in the Supreme Court of Victoria to seven concurrent sentences of life imprisonment with a non-parole period of 27 years, due to expire on 8 May 2014. In his sentence remarks, J Hampel commented that there were "…a number of significant mitigatory factors…" and "…the fixing of a minimum term in this case is appropriate because of your age and your prospects of rehabilitation." The Crown prosecutor, Joe Dickson QC, "…did not contend that a minimum term should not be fixed."

It was claimed that the motive for Knight's actions was military heroism, while impaired judgement due to the consumption of alcohol on the day of the massacre, social exclusion, and financial instability were also influencing factors.

Incarcerated initially in the maximum-security Pentridge, Barwon, and Port Phillip prisons, he was moved to the medium-security Loddon Prison in 2025 as a result of prison closures.

Knight was eligible for parole in May 2014. However, approximately six weeks earlier, the Victorian Government, in response to community pressure, enacted legislation that was specifically designed "…to protect the community from Julian Knight by keeping him in jail until he can pose no threat…" The provisions allowed for release if Knight is in immediate danger of dying, or is so incapacitated that he no longer poses a danger to others. Knight's application for parole was declined and he appealed the validity of the legislation many times, including before the full bench of the High Court of Australia where, in August 2017, his case was dismissed.

A vexatious litigant, Knight was, in 2016, banned for life from commencing proceedings in the Victorian court system.

== Early life ==
Julian Knight is the eldest of three children. When he was ten days old, he was adopted by a family with strong army ties. Knight moved often as a child, living in Melbourne, Puckapunyal, and also abroad in Malaysia, Hong Kong, and Singapore. In early 1975, Knight's family settled in the Victorian town of Laverton, and he attended Laverton Primary School until the end of 1978. His parents divorced in 1980 when he was 12. He then attended Westbourne Grammar, Fitzroy High, and later Melbourne High schools. While at school, he was known for his fascination with guns and the military. In 1986, he attended La Trobe University to study French, German history, and politics.

== Military career ==
Knight joined the Australian Army Cadets aged 14 and served in two school cadet units, at Norwood Secondary and Melbourne High. He later enlisted in the Army Reserve at the age of 17 while in high school, serving as a trooper in the 4th/19th Prince of Wales's Light Horse Regiment, an armoured reconnaissance unit. Knight entered the Royal Military College, Duntroon on 13 January 1987, aged 18 years. While a military career had long been a dream, he performed poorly at studies and gained good results only in weapons expertise exercises. Knight resigned from the Army with effect from 24 July 1987 after an incident in which he stabbed his superior, a sergeant, while drinking. Knight later claimed that he was subjected to hazing whilst at Duntroon.

== Hoddle Street massacre ==
On the evening of Sunday, 9 August 1987—sixteen days after his resignation from the Army—Knight began firing two rifles and a shotgun on Hoddle Street in the Melbourne suburb of Clifton Hill. The shootings resulted in the deaths of seven people and serious injury to nineteen others. After a police chase lasting more than thirty minutes, Knight was apprehended in nearby Fitzroy North and arrested for the shootings.

During the 1988 trial, it was asserted that Knight had a personality disorder with hysterical features. Knight pleaded guilty to seven counts of murder and 46 counts of attempted murder, and, in 1989, was sentenced to seven concurrent terms of life imprisonment with a non-parole period of 27 years. He was eligible to apply for parole from May 2014.

The Hoddle Street massacre was the subject of several books, and two Australian TV documentaries: ABC TV's Hoddle Street (1988) and GTV Channel 9's Hoddle Street (2007).

== Prison life ==
Knight was incarcerated in the maximum-security Pentridge, Barwon, and Port Phillip prisons, including spending time in the protection section. Due to closures in the Victorian prison system, Knight was moved from maximum to the medium-security Loddon Prison in 2025.

During his imprisonment, Knight initiated many legal challenges to the Victorian government, and several proceedings against the ACT and Commonwealth governments. Knight's challenges concerned events and occurrences arising during his imprisonment and his dissatisfaction with prison management and prison discipline; and included his treatment as a cadet whilst at Duntroon. In 2016, the Victorian Supreme Court declared Knight as a vexatious litigant for life.

=== Sentence and non-parole period ===
In 2007, on the twentieth anniversary of the Hoddle Street massacre, the sentencing judge, Professor George Hampel, affirmed the extent of Knight's sentence.

On 2 April 2014, shortly before Knight became eligible for parole in May, the Victorian Parliament passed the Corrections Amendment (Parole) Act 2014 (Vic), which amended the Corrections Act 1986 (Vic) to prevent the parole board from ordering Knight's release "unless satisfied, amongst other things, that …Knight is in imminent danger of dying or is seriously incapacitated and that, as a result, he no longer has the physical ability to do harm to any person." In introducing the legislation, the Minister for Police and Emergency Services stated:

"Julian Knight committed one of the most heinous crimes in the history of Victoria. Victorians can rightly expect that the government will do whatever we can to ensure… Knight is never released until he can do no harm… This bill means that… Knight will never be released except in very restrictive circumstances… The effect of these provisions are that… Knight will die in jail, or will be in such a condition on release that he will be a threat to no-one."

— Kim Wells, Minister for Police and Emergency Services, 2014

Knight made application for parole in March 2016, and it was denied in July of that year. Knight was subsequently granted an appeal to the High Court of Australia, and claimed that the decision by the Adult Parole Board "…substantially impair[ed] the institutional integrity of a court…" as prescribed in Chapter III of the Australian Constitution; described as an ad hominem matter. On 18 August 2017, Knight's appeal was dismissed and he was ordered to pay costs.

=== Other legal matters ===
On 7 September 1992, Knight appeared before the Administrative Appeals Tribunal seeking a review of a decision where he was refused AUSTUDY for his university studies while imprisoned. On 22 October 2001, Knight appeared before the Victorian Supreme Court in his first court case against prison authorities, and sought an injunction to order the return of documents prepared for the inquest into the death of a prisoner who had hanged himself in 2000. The documents were returned in court that day, and the application was dismissed.

On 4 July 2002, Knight appeared before the Victorian Civil and Administrative Tribunal (VCAT) with a complaint regarding an abuse of human rights where prison officers removed items "…of a political nature…" from his cell. The items removed were a collection of business cards, pamphlets, and sheets of paper. One sheet of the paper had a large picture of Adolf Hitler in uniform. A second had a picture of Hitler with Nazi insignia and skull and cross-bones, and others only the insignia. The cards featured slogans such as "Stop the Asian invasion", "We just hate all queers", "White power", and "Dial-a-racist" with contact details. Along with the posters and paperwork, a large number of contraband items were found in Knight's cell, such as blades, sharpened knives, white supremacist literature, war literature, medication bottles, a leather belt, two television remote controls, an extension lead, a can opener, bale hooks, permanent markers, computer disks – many containing information relating to prison security and staff – pornographic material, sandpaper, masking tape, prison manuals, staff pictures, T.A.B. betting information, and prison and staff rosters. Knight's application was dismissed, even though many of the seized items were returned to him.

On 21 August 2002, Knight appeared before the Victorian Supreme Court seeking an injunction ordering that prison management and staff cease inspecting and withholding legal mail sent to or by the plaintiff. The application was dismissed. On 2 September 2002, Knight appeared before VCAT seeking access to various prison documents under the Freedom of Information Act 1982 (Vic). On 9 September, Knight appeared before the VCAT seeking "Full access to the daily staff rosters for HM Prison Barwon since the 1st May 2001" under the Freedom of Information Act. The application was affirmed.

On 7 October 2003, Knight appeared before the Victorian Supreme Court and sought injunctions in regarding the opening of private legal mail, prison disciplinary hearings, conditions in solitary confinement cells, and Knight's security classification and imprisonment in Barwon Prison's high security Acacia wing. The application was dismissed. Justice Philip Cummins said of Knight's application: "I consider that ordinary tax-payers should not be fixed with the burden of these proceedings. Accordingly, in each instance, I order that the costs of the proceedings of the respective defendants be paid by the plaintiff." On 11 November 2003, Knight appeared before the Victorian Supreme Court seeking an extension of time against a decision of VCAT. The application was dismissed with costs awarded against Knight. A Victorian Supreme Court appeal to gain access to a computer was dismissed in 2013.

On 26 November 2013, Knight made a 94-page submission to the Defence Abuse Response Task Force (DART). In 2014, he initiated court proceedings in the ACT Supreme Court against the Commonwealth of Australia and sought damages for the bastardisation he allegedly suffered whilst at RMC Duntroon. The case and subsequent appeal were both dismissed. Heard in the Federal Court in 2016, another case for compensation was dismissed with costs awarded against Knight. A civil case against alleged abusers whilst Knight was at Duntroon was launched in 2014.

==== Vexatious litigant ====
In February 2003, it was estimated that the many legal challenges by Knight had cost the Victorian Government over A$250,000, and approximately $128,000 had been spent since October 2001 on external legal advice to deal with Knight's legal appeals and Freedom of Information requests.

On 19 October 2004, Knight was barred from launching any further legal action in Victoria's courts for ten years, with a judge declaring him a vexatious litigant. He was the thirteenth person declared as a vexatious litigant in Victoria since 1930, and the first prisoner. Knight is able to make requests under the Freedom of Information Act. On 19 June 2008, Knight made a submission to the Victorian Parliament Law Reform Committee's Inquiry into Vexatious Litigants.

In June 2009, Knight sued Attorney-General Rob Hulls in the Supreme Court in an attempt to remove his status as a "vexatious litigant". Knight claimed that the status was "…being used as an instrument of oppression by Corrections Victoria…" and stated that his request for access to a personal computer in his cell was denied. Following an application by the Attorney-General to extend the ten-year ban, in 2016 the Supreme Court declared Knight as a vexatious litigant for life. In reaching his decision, Justice Jack Forrest stated that "…Knight's applications, frequently baseless, take up scarce judicial resources and mean that other non-vexatious litigants are delayed in accessing justice." In evidence tendered by the Attorney-General, despite the ten-year ban, between 2004 and 2014 Knight had sought approval to launch forty separate cases, and was granted leave to pursue six of those cases. Knight was successful in three matters. J Forrest commented that of the six matters granted leave, they were for "…relatively inconsequential grievances…" that were unworthy of agitation.

=== Requests for rehabilitation ===
On 26 June 2007, Knight told the Supreme Court that he wanted access to rehabilitation programs in prison to improve his chance of parole. He also sought permission to write a letter of "apology and explanation" to one of his victims. The court heard prison authorities intercepted a letter Knight tried to send to one of his victims. He was charged with two prison offences and spent six days in solitary confinement. Knight told the court a letter of apology did not fit the prison guidelines for a prohibited letter, stating, "A letter of apology constitutes a facet of my rehabilitation and, on a small measure, of making amends for my actions," he told the court. Knight was given leave by the Court to proceed with his case.

In 2015, Knight wrote to the Governor of Victoria, seeking a petition of mercy as a Royal prerogative.

== See also ==
- History of Australian gun laws
- Port Arthur massacre
  - Martin Bryant
- List of rampage killers
