= 2018 in Australia =

- Monarch: Elizabeth II
- Governor-General: Sir Peter Cosgrove
- Prime minister: Malcolm Turnbull, then Scott Morrison
- Australian of the Year: Michelle Simmons
- Elections: TAS, SA, VIC

The following lists events that happened during 2018 in Australia.

- Decades: 1990s; 2000s; 2010s; 2020s; 2030s
- See also: 2018 in Australian television; 2018 in Australian literature; Other events of 2018; Timeline of Australian history

== Incumbents ==
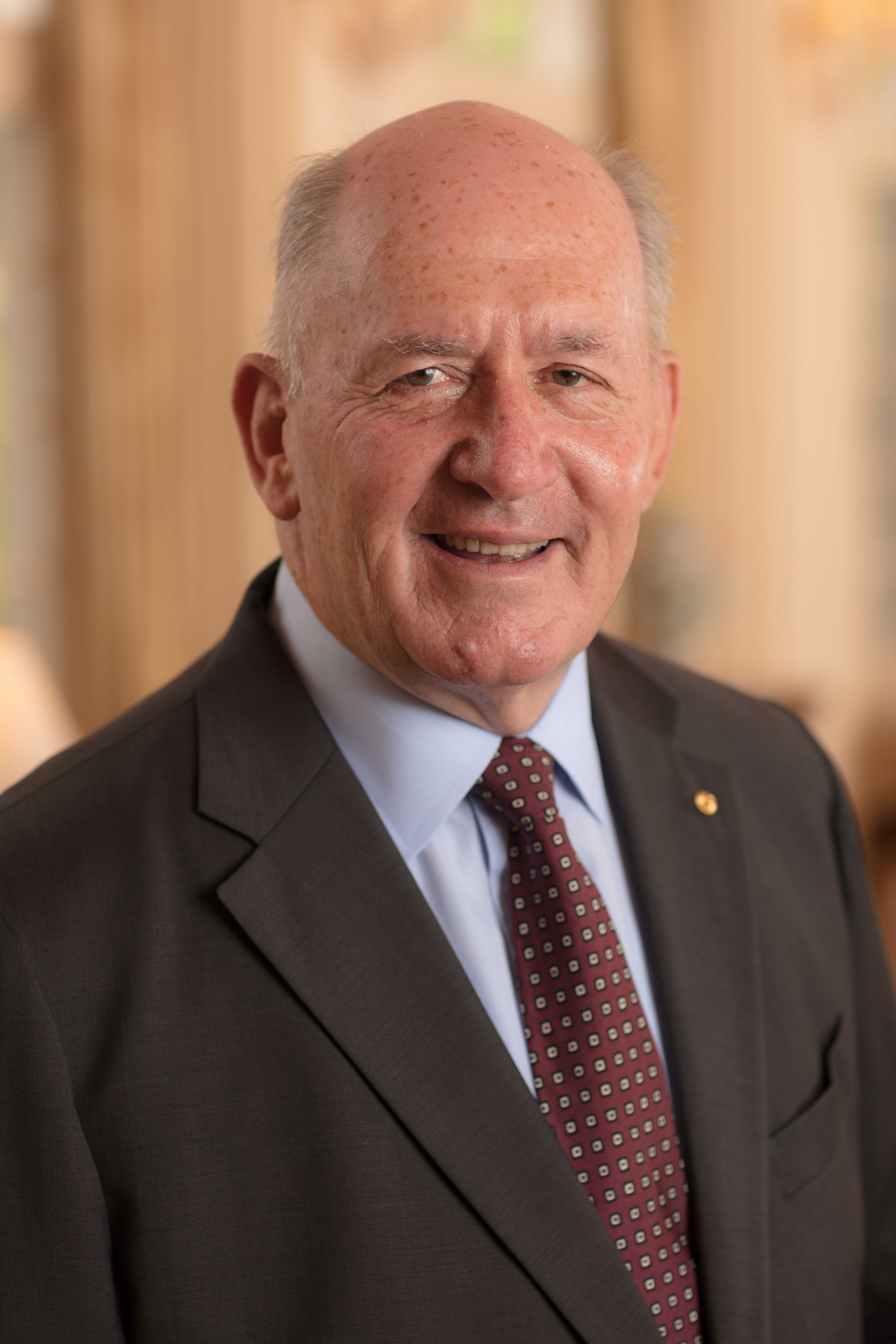
Sir Peter Cosgrove

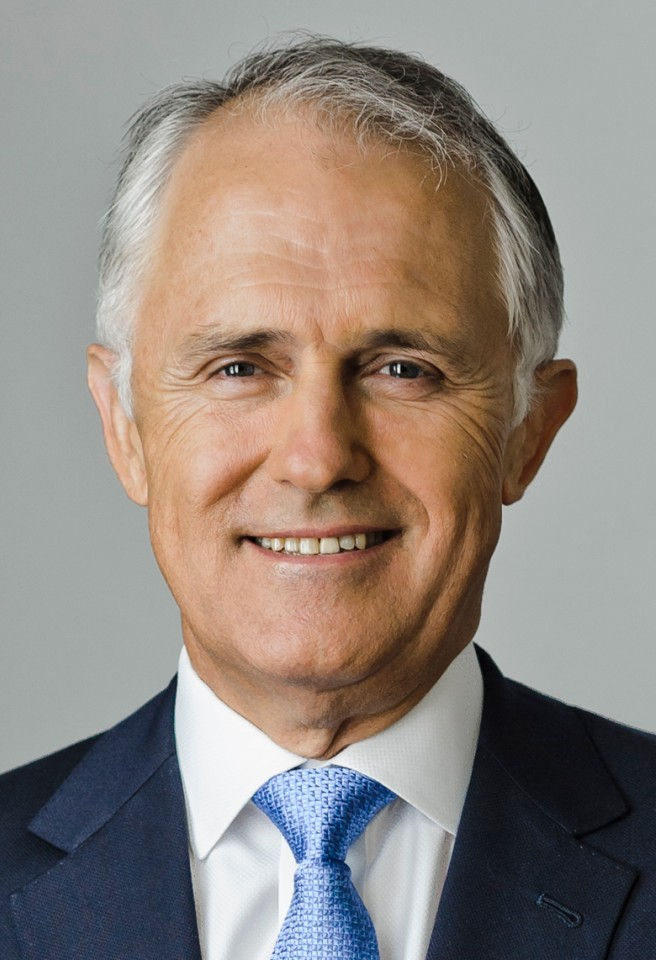
Malcolm Turnbull

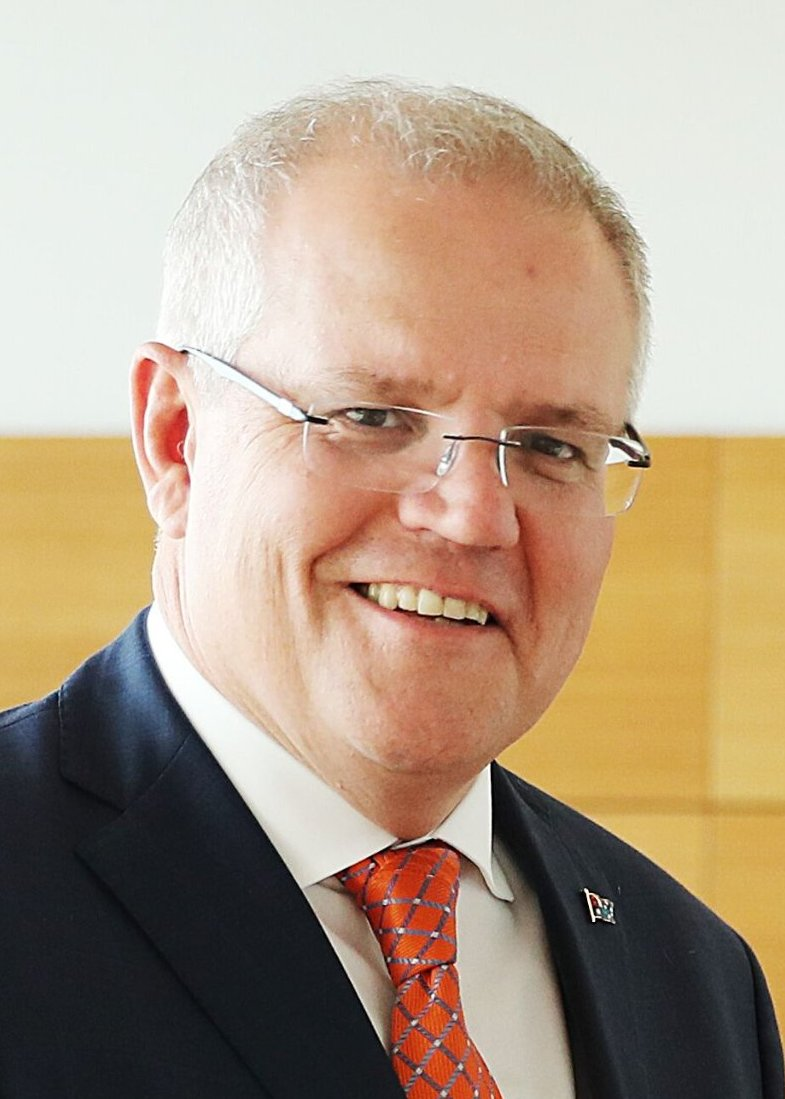
Scott Morrison

- Monarch – Elizabeth II
- Governor-General – Sir Peter Cosgrove
- Prime Minister – Malcolm Turnbull (until 24 August), then Scott Morrison
  - Deputy Prime Minister – Barnaby Joyce (until 26 February), then Michael McCormack
  - Opposition Leader – Bill Shorten
- Chief Justice – Susan Kiefel

=== State and territory leaders ===
- Premier of New South Wales – Gladys Berejiklian
  - Opposition Leader – Luke Foley (until 8 November), then Michael Daley
- Premier of Queensland – Annastacia Palaszczuk
  - Opposition Leader – Deb Frecklington
- Premier of South Australia – Jay Weatherill (until 19 March), then Steven Marshall
  - Opposition Leader – Steven Marshall (until 19 March), then Peter Malinauskas (from 9 April)
- Premier of Tasmania – Will Hodgman
  - Opposition Leader – Rebecca White
- Premier of Victoria – Daniel Andrews
  - Opposition Leader – Matthew Guy (until 6 December), then Michael O'Brien
- Premier of Western Australia – Mark McGowan
  - Opposition Leader – Mike Nahan
- Chief Minister of the Australian Capital Territory – Andrew Barr
  - Opposition Leader – Alistair Coe
- Chief Minister of the Northern Territory – Michael Gunner
  - Opposition Leader – Gary Higgins

=== Governors and administrators ===
- Governor of New South Wales – David Hurley
- Governor of Queensland – Paul de Jersey
- Governor of South Australia – Hieu Van Le
- Governor of Tasmania – Kate Warner
- Governor of Victoria – Linda Dessau
- Governor of Western Australia – Kerry Sanderson (until 1 May), then Kim Beazley
- Administrator of the Australian Indian Ocean Territories – Natasha Griggs
- Administrator of Norfolk Island – Eric Hutchinson
- Administrator of the Northern Territory – Vicki O'Halloran

== Events ==
=== January ===
- 18 January – Malaysia Airlines Flight MH122 from Sydney to Kuala Lumpur is forced to make an emergency landing in Alice Springs after experiencing engine problems.
- 20 January – Authorities evacuate the Royal National Park south of Sydney as two fires burn out of control, with smoke visible across the city.
- 26 January – Tens of thousands of protesters march in Sydney and Melbourne in "Invasion Day" rallies.
- 31 January – The ABC publishes information from hundreds of classified Cabinet documents which were found in two second-hand filing cabinets purchased at a sale of ex-government furniture.

=== February ===
- 1 February – David Feeney resigns as MP for Batman, after he is unable to find documentation confirming that he had renounced his British citizenship.
- 6 February – News Corp reveals that Deputy Prime Minister Barnaby Joyce is expecting a baby with a former staffer, following the break-up of his marriage.
- 11 February – The Melbourne's Domain Parkland and Memorial Precinct—including Kings Domain, Alexandra Gardens, Queen Victoria Gardens, the Melbourne Observatory, the Shrine of Remembrance and Government House, Melbourne—was added to the Australian National Heritage List.
- 12 February – The Royal Commission into Misconduct in the Banking, Superannuation and Financial Services Industry, headed by Kenneth Hayne, opens in Melbourne.
- 23 February –
  - Barnaby Joyce announces he will stand down on 26 February as leader of the National Party and therefore as Deputy Prime Minister of Australia following pressure from government and public figures over his relationship with a former staffer.
  - A voluntary recall of rockmelons is started after several deaths from listeriosis contracted from consuming the fruit. As of 20 March 2018, nineteen infections and six deaths have been linked to rockmelon-related listeria.
- 26 February – New South Wales MP Michael McCormack wins the National Party of Australia leadership election and becomes Deputy Prime Minister of Australia, brought about by the resignation of Barnaby Joyce, defeating Queensland MP George Christensen.

=== March ===
- 3 March – The Liberal Party led by Will Hodgman wins a second term of government but with a reduced majority at the 2018 Tasmanian state election.
- 5 March - The Australian Border Force conducts an early morning raid on a family home in Biloela, Queensland and forcibly removes a Sri Lankan Tamil asylum seeker family and takes them into immigration detention in Melbourne before being transferring them to Christmas Island. The family's plight garners ongoing media attention and prompts supporters to launch the Home to Bilo campaign.
- 10 March – A state of disaster is declared in Queensland, after flooding between Cairns and Townsville, with some catchment areas receiving over 700mm in four days.
- 14 March – Peter Dutton calls to treat White South African farmers as refugees, stating that "they need help from a civilised country". and was met with "regret" by the South African foreign ministry. The Australian High Commissioner was subsequently summoned by the South African foreign ministry, which expressed its offence at Dutton's statements, and demanded a "full retraction".
- 17 March –
  - The Liberal Party under Steven Marshall wins the 2018 South Australian state election, defeating the Labor Party and incumbent Premier Jay Weatherill.
  - The Labor Party wins the Batman by-election, maintaining its numbers in the House of Representatives.
  - The Liberal Party wins the Cottesloe by-election, maintaining its numbers in the Western Australian Legislative Assembly.
- 18 March – Hot and windy conditions see a bushfire destroy over 70 buildings at Tathra on the New South Wales South Coast, while 18 homes are destroyed by a grass fire in Western Victoria.
- 24 March – Qantas launches the first direct passenger flight between Australia and Europe, beginning its service between Perth and London.
- 25 March – Australian cricket captain Steve Smith is suspended, and Prime Minister Malcolm Turnbull calls for action from Cricket Australia, after members of the Australian team admit to ball tampering during a match against South Africa.

=== April ===
- 20 April – Craig Meller resigns as CEO of AMP Limited after revelations in the banking royal commission that the financial services company charged clients for financial advice which was not provided, and then misled the Australian Securities & Investments Commission.

=== May ===
- 7 May – Ancient HTLV-1 virus detected in indigenous communities in Australia, raising concerns and calls to stop the spread.
- 9 May –
  - An estimated 100,000 union workers march through Melbourne's CBD in protest of workplace conditions in a rally to kick off the Australian Council of Trade Unions's "Change the Rules" campaign.
  - The High Court of Australia rules in Re: Gallagher that Katy Gallagher was ineligible to be chosen as a Senator, as her submission of a renunciation of British citizenship was not sufficient to meet the "reasonable steps" clause of Section 44 of the Constitution of Australia. Four lower house MPs in the same situation subsequently resign: Labor's Justine Keay, Susan Lamb and Josh Wilson, and Centre Alliance's Rebekha Sharkie.
- 11 May –
  - Over 10,000 homes are left without power, and over 120mm of rain causes flooding in the Hobart central business district and at the University of Tasmania, as severe weather sweeps across southern Tasmania.
  - Four children and three adults are found shot dead at a house in Osmington, Western Australia in what police believe is a murder-suicide, and Australia's worst mass shooting since the Port Arthur massacre in 1996.
- 22 May – The Archbishop of Adelaide, Philip Wilson, is found guilty by Newcastle Local Court of covering up child sexual abuse cases which occurred in the 1970s.
- 23 May - NSW Labor leader Luke Foley makes comments about White flight. His view that an influx of people of non-European descent had driven many White Australians to leave parts of Sydney. He was condemned by Premier Gladys Berejiklian.

=== June ===
- 4 June – Woolworths announces it will reduce the level of plastic packaging in its supermarkets, in particular, eliminating straws and plastic wrapping on fresh produce.
- 13 June – Northern Territory Independent Commissioner Against Corruption is appointed.
- 23 June – The Liberal Party wins the Darling Range by-election, increasing its numbers in the Western Australian Legislative Assembly.

=== July ===
- 1 July – The Australian Space Agency formally commences operation with Megan Clark as inaugural Head.
- 26 July – A proposed merger of Fairfax Media and Nine Entertainment Co is announced.
- 28 July – A "Super Saturday" of an unprecedented five simultaneous federal by-elections takes place. They are held in the divisions of Braddon, Fremantle, Longman, Mayo, and Perth, with no change to numbers in the House of Representatives.

=== August ===
- 5 August – Outgoing race discrimination commissioner Tim Soutphommasane slams the 'resurgence of far-right politics' in Australia.
- 6 August – Sky News Australia is heavily criticised for providing a platform to Blair Cottrell, leader of the far-right, organisation United Patriots Front in a one-on-one discussion about immigration on The Adam Giles Show. Sky News presenters, including Laura Jayes and David Speers, were among those critical (both on-air and off-air) of his appearance on the program."
- 8 August – The New South Wales Government announces that the entire state is in drought.
- 14 August – Senator Fraser Anning delivers his maiden speech to the Senate in what is described as "the most inflammatory maiden speech to an Australian Parliament since One Nation leader Pauline Hanson's in 1996." In it, he calls for a plebiscite to reinstate White Australia policy, especially with regard to Muslims.
- 21 August – Prime Minister Malcolm Turnbull declares a leadership spill in the Liberal Party, following pressure from conservatives in the party. Turnbull is challenged by Peter Dutton, but wins the vote by 48 to 35 votes.
- 24 August – The Liberal Party of Australia holds a second leadership spill. Malcolm Turnbull resigns as party leader, and Scott Morrison is elected as his replacement, becoming the 30th Prime Minister of Australia.
- 31 August – Former Prime Minister Malcolm Turnbull resigns from parliament triggering a by-election in his seat of Wentworth.

=== September ===
- 2 September – Queensland Labor premier, Annastacia Palaszczuk cuts Katter's Australian Party parliamentary stuff numbers. Due to Fraser Anning immigration comments.
- 8 September – A by-election was held in the Electoral district of Wagga Wagga left vacant by the resignation of Daryl Maguire.
- 9 September – Western Australia Police find five bodies in a house in the Perth suburb of Bedford, the result of a suspected mass killing.
- 15 September – The Queensland Government announces a $100,000 reward for information leading to an arrest of a person responsible for the contamination of strawberries using needles and pins, following several cases of contamination across Queensland, New South Wales and Victoria. The contamination later expanded to affect strawberries grown in Western Australia.
- 16 September – Prime Minister Scott Morrison announces a Royal Commission into Aged Care Quality and Safety.
- 24 September – Michelle Guthrie is dismissed as managing director of the Australian Broadcasting Corporation by the ABC Board.
- 27 September – Following the dismissal of Michelle Guthrie, ABC Board chairman Justin Milne resigns amid reports he had tried to influence ABC management to sack two senior journalists.

=== October ===
- 15 October – it was revealed the NSW National Party and the Young Nationals had been infiltrated by a significant number of neo-Nazis with a number of members being investigated for alleged links to neo-Nazism. Party leader Michael McCormack denounced these attempts stating that "The Nationals will not tolerate extremism or the politics of hate. People found to engage with such radicalism are not welcome in our party.
  - One Nation leader Pauline Hanson proposes an "It's OK to be white" motion in the Australian Senate intended to acknowledge the "deplorable rise of anti-white racism and attacks on Western civilization". It was supported by most senators from the governing Liberal-National Coalition, but was defeated 31–28 by opponents who called it a racist slogan from the white supremacist movement. The following day, the motion was "recommitted", and this time rejected unanimously by senators in attendance, with its initial supporters in the Liberal-National Coalition saying they had voted for it due to an administrative error (One Nation did not attend the recommital vote).
- 20 October – A by-election in Wentworth, the seat vacated by former prime minister Malcolm Turnbull, is won by independent Kerryn Phelps, with the Morrison government losing its one-seat majority in the lower house.

=== November ===
- 9 November – Hassan Khalif Shire Ali sets his car on fire and attacks passers-by with a knife in Bourke Street, Melbourne, before he is shot and killed by police. Sisto Malaspina, co-owner of Pellegrini's Espresso Bar, was killed in the attack.
- 22 November –
  - Bali Nine drug smuggler Renae Lawrence returns to Australia after spending 13 years in prison, following her arrest in Indonesia in 2005.
  - A retrial finds David Eastman, who had spent 19 years in jail, not guilty of the Canberra 1989 murder of Assistant Australian Federal Police Commissioner Colin Winchester.
- 24 November – The Labor Party led by Daniel Andrews wins a second term of government with an increased majority at the 2018 Victorian state election.
- 27 to 29 November – Residents of several towns in Central Queensland are urged to evacuate as the region is hit by bushfires, with two homes destroyed.
- 28 November – Two people die during storms that hit Sydney and the Illawarra region, delivering a month's worth of rain in a few hours.

=== December ===
- 15 December – Australia officially recognizes West Jerusalem as the capital of Israel. The move is seen as controversial and bizarre by some as only partially recognizing Jerusalem is deemed unlikely to please either the Israelis or Palestinians entirely.
- 24 December – Thousands of residents of an apartment block in Sydney Olympic Park are forced to evacuate following structural concerns and fears the 36-storey building could collapse.

== Music, arts and literature ==
- 27 January – Kendrick Lamar's song "HUMBLE" tops Triple J's 2017 Hottest 100.
- 12 April – Alexis Wright wins the 2018 Stella Prize for Tracker, her biography of Tracker Tilmouth.
- 11 May – Yvette Coppersmith wins the 2018 Archibald Prize for her painting Self-portrait, after George Lambert.
- 26 August – Michelle de Kretser wins the Miles Franklin Award for the second time, for her novel The Life to Come.

== Sport ==
=== January ===
- 6 January – Tennis: The Swiss team consisting of Roger Federer and Belinda Bencic defeat Germany 2–1 in the final of the 2018 Hopman Cup.
- 14 January – Cycling: Amanda Spratt riding for the Mitchelton–Scott team wins the 2018 Women's Tour Down Under in a time of 10h 47' 21".
- 21 January –
  - Basketball: Townsville Fire defeated Melbourne Boomers 70–57 in the third and deciding game of the 2017–18 WNBL season grand final series at Townsville RSL Stadium.
  - Cycling: Daryl Impey riding for the Mitchelton–Scott team wins the 2018 Tour Down Under in a time of 20h 03' 34.
- 25 January – Tennis: Australians Dylan Alcott and Heath Davidson win the Wheelchair Quad Doubles title at the Australian Open.
- 27 January –
  - Tennis: Australian Dylan Alcott wins the Wheelchair Quad Singles title at the Australian Open, his fifth Grand Slam Singles title and fourth consecutive Australian Open Singles title.
  - Tennis: Caroline Wozniacki defeats Simona Halep 7–6 3–6 6–4 at Melbourne Park in the final of the 2018 Australian Open women's singles.
- 28 January –
  - Tennis: Roger Federer defeats Marin Čilić 6–2 6–7 6–3 3–6 6–1 at Melbourne Park in the final of the 2018 Australian Open men's singles.
  - Rugby sevens: Australia defeat New Zealand 31–0 in the final of the 2018 Sydney Women's Sevens at Sydney Football Stadium.
  - Rugby sevens: Australia defeat South Africa 29–0 in the final of the 2018 Sydney Sevens at Sydney Football Stadium.

=== February ===
- 4 February –
  - Cricket: Sydney Sixers defeat Perth Scorchers by nine wickets at Adelaide Oval in Adelaide to win Women's Big Bash League 03.
  - Cricket: Adelaide Strikers defeat Hobart Hurricanes by 25 runs at Adelaide Oval in Adelaide to win Big Bash League 07.
  - Tennis: Australia was defeated by Germany 3–1 in the first round of the 2018 Davis Cup World Group at the Queensland Tennis Centre in Brisbane.
- 16 February – Rugby league: 2017 NRL Premiers Melbourne Storm defeat Super League XXII champions Leeds Rhinos 38–4 in the 2018 World Club Challenge, held at AAMI Park.
- 18 February – Association football: Melbourne City FC defeated Sydney FC 2–0 at Sydney Football Stadium to win the 2018 W-League Grand Final, Melbourne City's third Championship in a row.

=== March ===
- 24 March –
  - Australian rules football: The Western Bulldogs defeat the Brisbane Lions 4.3 (27) to 3.3 (21) at the 2018 AFL Women's Grand Final.
  - Cricket: On day 3 of the third Test against South Africa, Australian cricketer Cameron Bancroft is charged with ball-tampering, after cameras detect him scuffing the ball. Bancroft and team captain Steve Smith admit the plan was devised by the team's leadership group. Smith and vice-captain David Warner are subsequently stood down from their roles for the remainder of the Test and thereafter banned by the Cricket Australia for 12 months, while Bancroft received a 9-month ban, from international and domestic cricket.
- 25 March – Motorsport: Sebastian Vettel wins the 2018 Australian Grand Prix at Albert Park in Melbourne, defeating Lewis Hamilton and teammate Kimi Räikkönen.
- 31 March – Basketball: Melbourne United defeated Adelaide 36ers 100-82 in the deciding fifth game of the 2017–18 NBL season grand final at Hisense Arena in Melbourne.

=== April ===
- 4 to 15 April – Commonwealth Games: The 2018 Commonwealth Games are held on the Gold Coast, Queensland. This is the fifth time Australia has hosted the Commonwealth Games, 12 years after they were held in Melbourne.
- 5 April – Surfing: Australian Stephanie Gilmore wins her fourth Bells Beach Classic title while retiring Australian Mick Fanning is defeated in the men's final by Brazilian Italo Ferreira.

=== May ===
- 5 May – Association football: Melbourne Victory defeats the Newcastle Jets 0–1 at the 2018 A-League Grand Final. Melbourne's winning goal is later found to have been offside, but was not detected in time due to a failure of the video assistant referee system.

=== June ===
- 6 June – Rugby league: New South Wales defeats Queensland 22–12 at the Melbourne Cricket Ground in the first match of the 2018 State of Origin series. NSW fullback James Tedesco is awarded man of the match.
- 24 June – Rugby league New South Wales defeats Queensland 18–14 at Stadium Australia in the second match of the 2018 State of Origin series. NSW second-rower and captain Boyd Cordner is awarded man of the match.

=== July ===
- 11 July – Rugby league: Queensland defeats New South Wales 18–12 at Suncorp Stadium in the third match of the 2018 State of Origin series. Queensland fullback and captain Billy Slater is awarded both man of the match and the Wally Lewis Medal for player of the series.

=== August ===
- 26 August – Netball: Sunshine Coast Lightning defeat West Coast Fever 62–59 in front of a record crowd on 13,722 at Perth Arena in the Grand Final of the 2018 Suncorp Super Netball season.

=== September ===
- 2 September – Rugby league: Sydney Roosters win the minor premiership following the final main round of the 2018 NRL season. The Parramatta Eels finish in last position, claiming the wooden spoon.
- 24 September – Australian rules football: Tom Mitchell of Hawthorn Football Club wins the 2018 Brownlow Medal.
- 26 September – Rugby league: Roger Tuivasa-Sheck of the New Zealand Warriors wins the 2018 Dally M Medal and Brittany Breayley of the Brisbane Broncos wins Female Player of the Year.
- 29 September – Australian rules football: West Coast Eagles defeat Collingwood 79 to 74 to win the 2018 AFL Grand Final.
- 30 September –
  - Rugby league: Sydney Roosters defeat Melbourne Storm 21–6 to win the 2018 NRL Grand Final. Roosters five-eighth Luke Keary is awarded the Clive Churchill Medal for Man of the Match. Pre-match entertainment is headlined by Gang of Youths.
  - Rugby league: The Brisbane Broncos defeat the Sydney Roosters 34–12 in the inaugural NRL Women's Premiership Grand Final.

=== October ===
- 7 October – Motor racing: Craig Lowndes wins the 2018 Bathurst 1000, his seventh Bathurst 1000 win.
- 10 October – Cricket: Victoria defeat Tasmania by 110 runs at the Junction Oval in Melbourne in the final of the 2018–19 JLT One-Day Cup.
- 20 October – Parasport: The fourth Invictus Games are opened by Prince Harry at a ceremony held at the forecourt of the Sydney Opera House.
- 30 October – Football: Adelaide United defeats Sydney FC 2–1 in the 2018 FFA Cup Final at Hindmarsh Stadium in Adelaide.

=== November ===
- 6 November – Horse racing: Cross Counter wins the 158th Melbourne Cup.

=== December ===
- 28 December – Yacht racing: Wild Oats XI wins its ninth line honours in the 2018 Sydney to Hobart Yacht Race. A protest lodged by the race committee, following a claim that the yacht's AIS was switched off, is dismissed by an international jury.

== Deaths ==
=== January ===
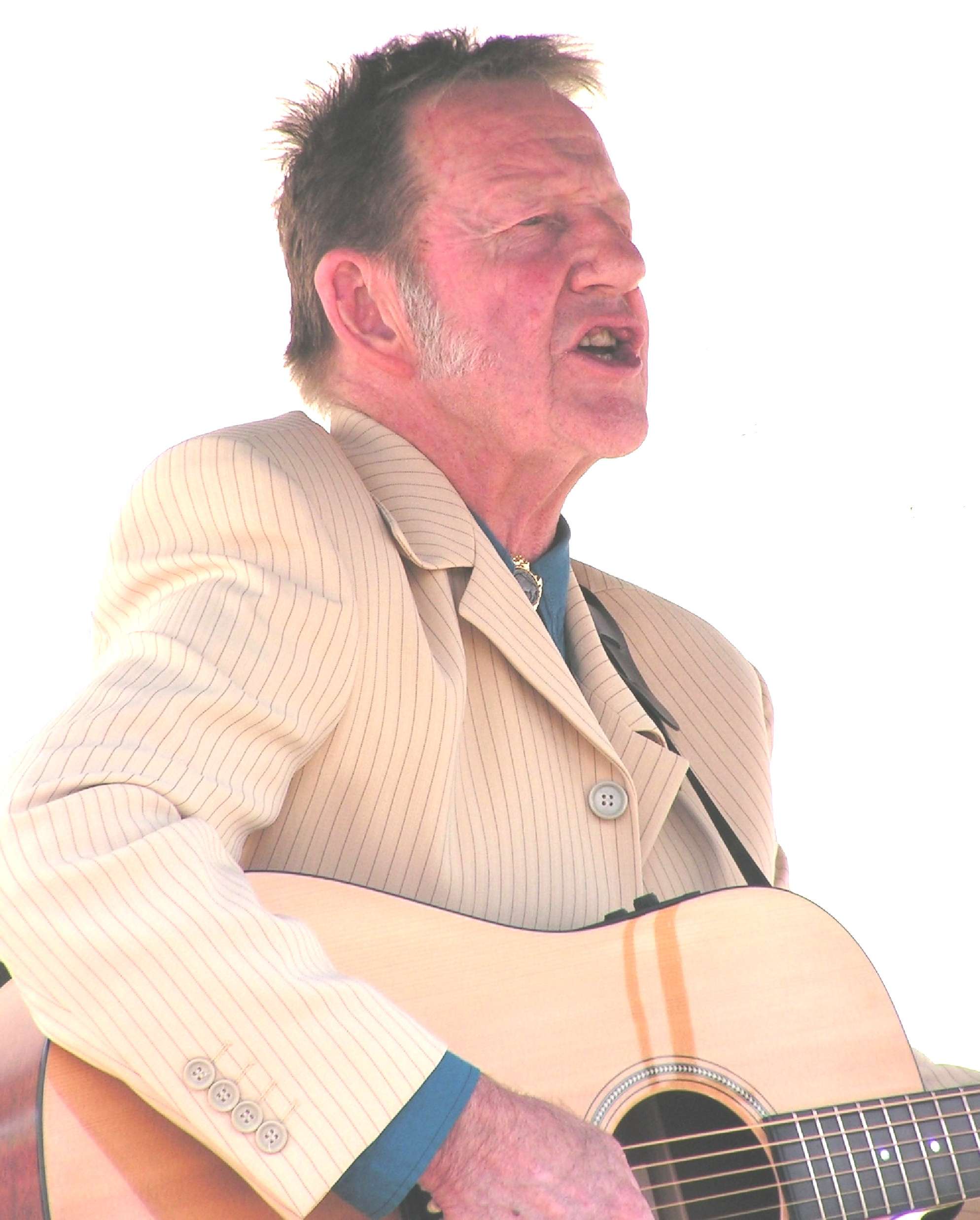
Steve Foster

- 2 January – Bryan Conquest, 87, politician
- 3 January – Colin Brumby, 84, composer and conductor
- 8 January –
  - Ron Tandberg, 74, cartoonist
  - Keith McKenzie, 95, Australian rules football player and coach
- 16 January – Moya O'Sullivan, 91, actress
- 20 January –
  - Graeme Langlands, 76, rugby league player
  - Barry Williams, 79, skeptic
- 22 January – Peter Diversi, 85, rugby league player
- 24 January – Bruce Light, 68, Australian rules football player
- 25 January – Steve Foster, 71, singer-songwriter
- 30 January – Ron Walker, 78, businessman, Lord Mayor of Melbourne.

=== February ===
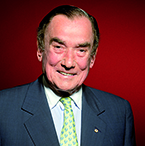
Michael Crouch

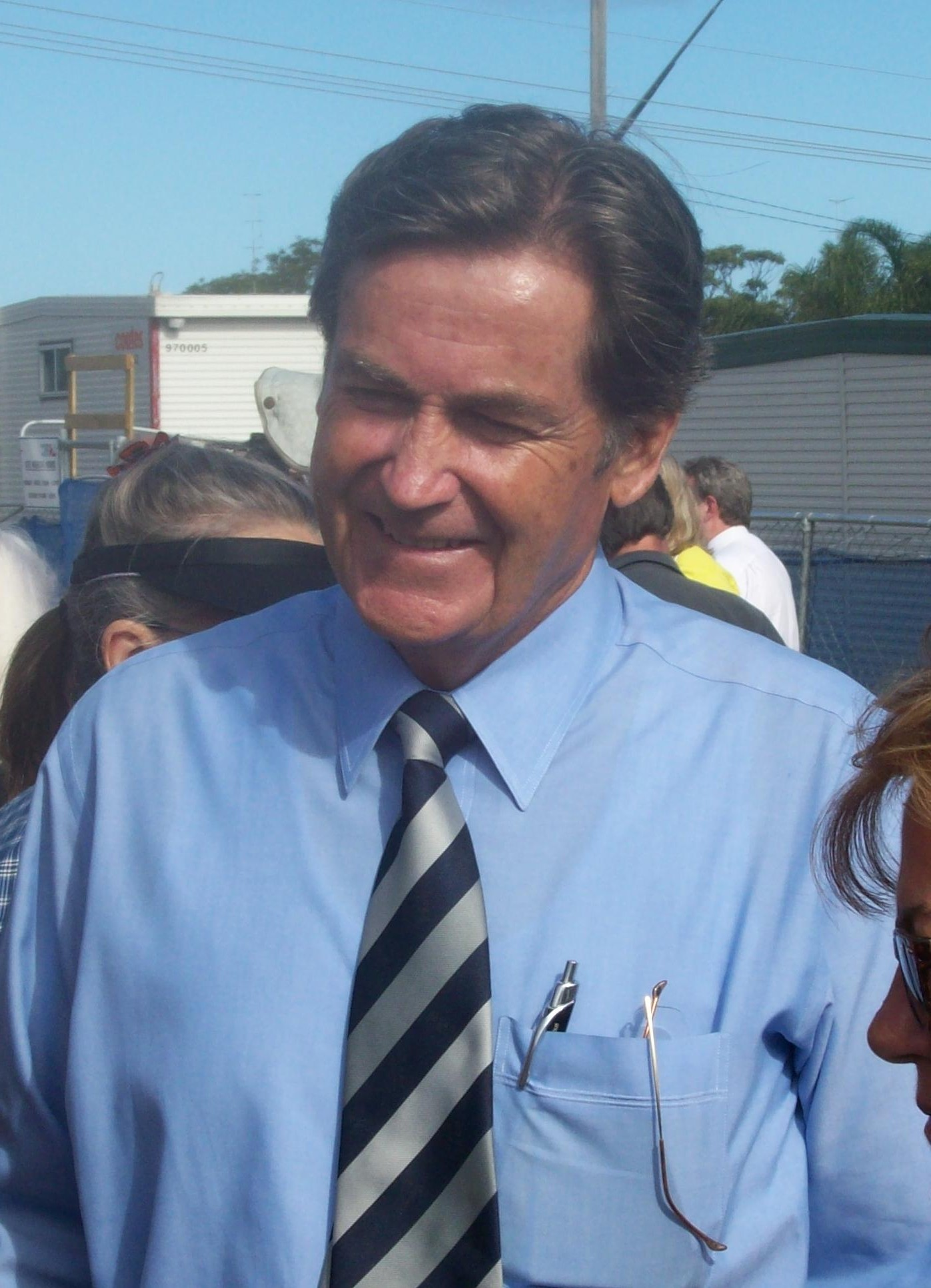
Grant McBride

- 3 February – Michael Gordon, 62, journalist
- 5 February – Hugh Wirth, 78, veterinarian and animal welfare advocate
- 8 February –
  - Jarrod Bannister, 33, javelin thrower (died in the Netherlands)
  - Don Hart, 87 Australian rules football player (Fitzroy)
- 9 February – Michael Crouch, 84, businessman and philanthropist
- 10 February – John Muir, 73, Queensland Supreme Court judge
- 11 February – Nicholas Shehadie, 92, rugby union player, Lord Mayor of Sydney
- 12 February – Grant McBride, 68, New South Wales politician
- 15 February – Geoff Jones, 87, Australian rules football player (St Kilda)
- 21 February –
  - John Cribb, 67, criminal
  - Zelda D'Aprano, 90, activist
- 23 February –
  - Eddy Amoo, 73, British soul singer
  - Graeme Gahan, 76, Australian rules football player (Richmond)
- 25 February –
  - Max Cole, 77, Australian rules football player (Fitzroy)
  - Ainsley Gotto, 72, political staffer and entrepreneur
  - Nev Pask, 87, property developer
- 27 February – Steve Folkes, 59, rugby league player and coach

=== March ===
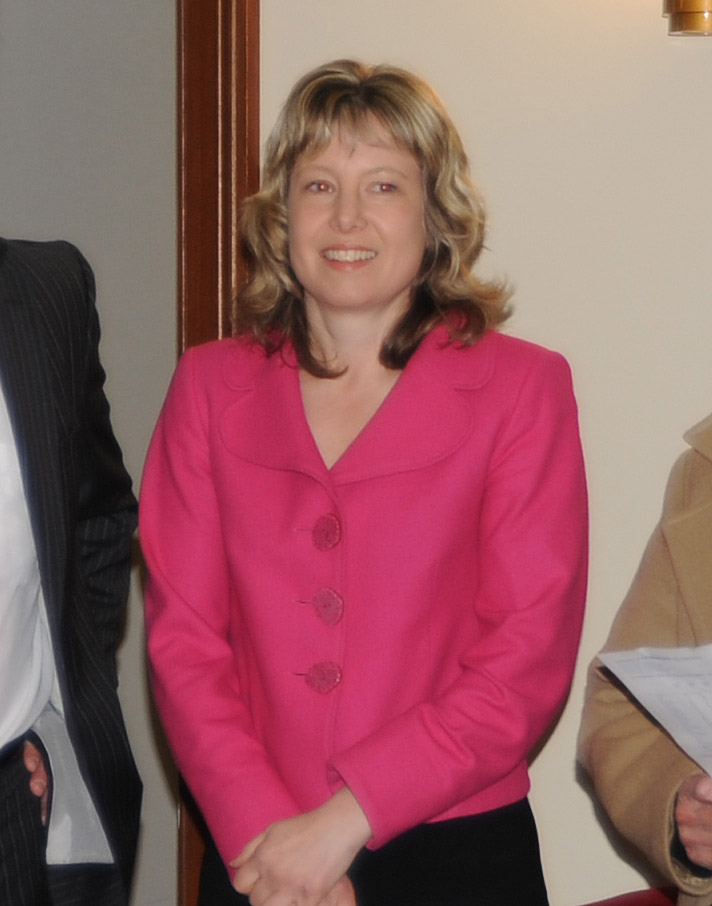
Vanessa Goodwin

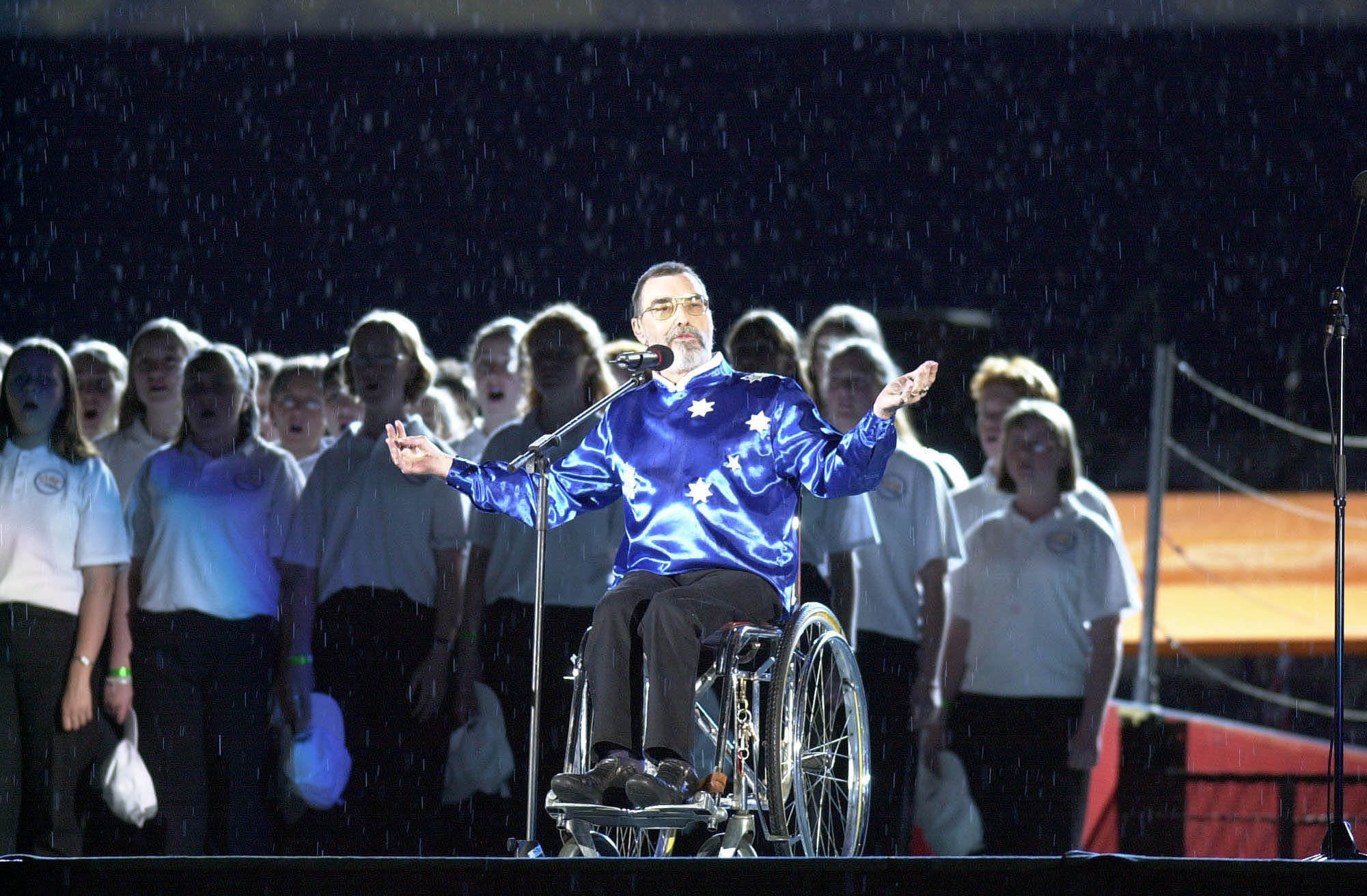
Jeff St John

- 3 March –
  - Mal Bryce, 74, Western Australian politician
  - Vanessa Goodwin, 48, Tasmanian politician
- 5 March – Jeff St John, 71, singer
- 6 March – Peter Nicholls, 78, literary scholar and critic
- 8 March – Peter Temple, 71, novelist
- 10 March – Tony Benneworth, 67, Tasmanian cricketer and politician
- 11 March –
  - Bob Baxt, 79, lawyer and academic
  - John Daly, 81, Olympic coach and academic
- 17 March – Dexter Davies, 66, Western Australian politician
- 18 March – David Cooper, 69, immunologist
- 24 March – Joe Malone, 94, Australian rules footballer (North Melbourne)
- 25 March – Edwin Carr, 89, Olympic sprinter
- 27 March – Sir Eric McClintock, 99, public servant and businessman

=== April ===
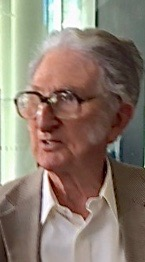
Michael Halliday

- 1 April –
  - Gil Brealey, 85, film producer and director
  - Jocelyn Newman, 80, Tasmanian politician
- 8 April – Tate Adams, 96, printmaker
- 11 April – Polixeni Papapetrou, 57, photographic artist
- 12 April – Stuart Devlin, 86, gold and silversmith
- 15 April – Michael Halliday, 93, linguist
- 16 April – Ivan Mauger, 78, New Zealand motorcycle speedway rider
- 19 April – Darrell Eastlake, 75, sports commentator
- 20 April –
  - Dick Hughes, 86, jazz pianist and journalist
  - Shane Yarran, 28, Australian rules footballer
- 24 April – Paul Gray, 54, singer-songwriter (Wa Wa Nee)
- 26 April – Michael Luscombe, 64, businessman, CEO of Woolworths
- 30 April –
  - Jan Cameron, 71, Olympic swimming medallist and coach
  - Terry Mackenroth, 68, Queensland politician

=== May ===
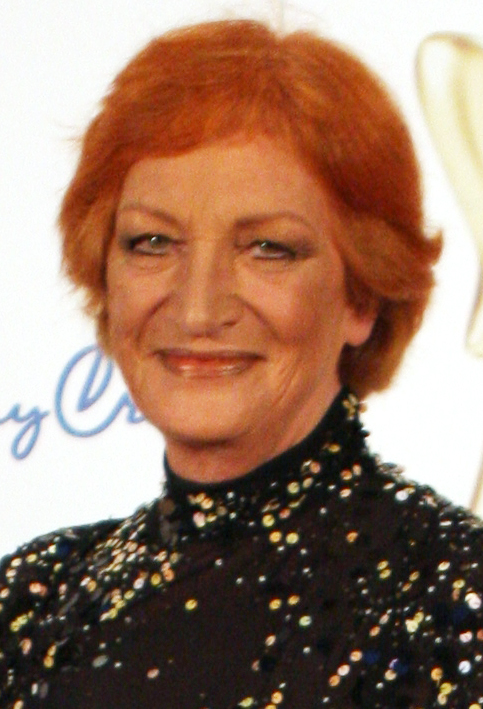
Cornelia Frances

- 2 May – Cliff Watson, 78, rugby league footballer
- 4 May –
  - Cathy Godbold, 43, television actress
  - Patricia Lascelles, Countess of Harewood, 91, Australian-born violinist and fashion model
- 6 May –
  - Leonard Faulkner, 91, Archbishop of Adelaide (1985–2001)
  - David Mitchell, 84, constitutional lawyer
- 9 May – Tan Duc Thanh Nguyen, 34, Bali Nine member (died in Indonesia)
- 10 May – David Goodall, 104, English-born botanist and ecologist (died in Switzerland)
- 11 May – Tom E. Lewis, 59, actor (The Chant of Jimmie Blacksmith)
- 18 May –
  - Sir John Carrick, 99, politician
  - Troy Waters, 53, boxer
- 19 May –
  - John Avery, 90, New South Wales Police Commissioner
  - David Treasure, 74, Victorian politician
- 20 May – Ernie Page, 83, New South Wales politician
- 21 May – Don Jessop, 90, politician
- 24 May – Phil Emmanuel, 65, guitarist
- 28 May – Cornelia Frances, 77, actress

=== June ===
- 1 June – Jill Ker Conway, 83, Australian-American scholar, author and businesswoman (died in the United States)
- 2 June –
  - Joe Berinson, 86, politician
  - Tony Morphett, 80, screenwriter
- 9 June – Deborah Cameron, 59, radio presenter
- 10 June – Ben Hills, investigative journalist
- 16 June – Ken Wood, 88, swimming coach
- 20 June – Peter Thomson, 88, golfer
- 21 June –
  - Sir Laurence Street, 91, Chief Justice of New South Wales
  - Hugh Stuckey, 89, comedy writer
- 22 June – Steve Condous, 82, South Australian politician
- 27 June –
  - Liz Jackson, 67, journalist and former barrister
  - William McBride, 91, obstetrician
- 28 June – Sam Bass, 73, South Australian politician

=== July ===
- 4 July – Harry M. Miller, 84, promoter, publicist and celebrity agent
- 9 July – Sam Chisholm, 78, television executive
- 11 July –
  - Abdel Aziem Al-Afifi, 48, Grand Mufti of Australia
  - Laurie Kelly, 89, New South Wales politician
- 16 July – Evan Whitton, 90, journalist
- 20 July – Jeff Hook, 89, cartoonist
- 29 July – Ian Stanley, 69, golfer

=== August ===
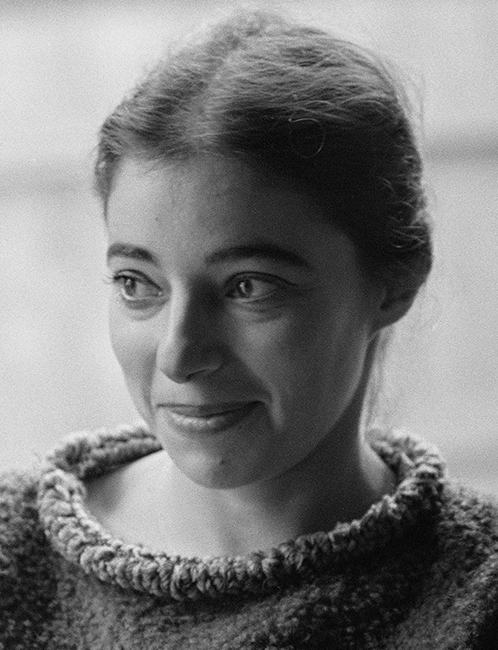
Mirka Mora

- 5 August –
  - Nev Warburton, 86, Queensland politician
  - Mary E. White, 92, paleobotanist
- 6 August – Nicole Kullen, 38, Paralympic equestrian
- 8 August –
  - Ronald Crawford, 82, racewalker
  - Jarrod Lyle, 36, golfer
  - Richard Searby, 87, lawyer
- 16 August – Jim McKiernan, 73, politician
- 17 August – Michael 'Tarzan' Fomenko, 88, ocean rower and hermetic bushman
- 20 August – Charles Blackman, 90, painter
- 21 August – Spencer P. Jones, 61, musician
- 22 August – Bill McGrath, 81, politician
- 23 August – Lance Thompson, 40, rugby league player
- 26 August –
  - Kerry Hill, 75, architect
  - Patrick Quilty, 79, Antarctic paleontologist
- 27 August – Mirka Mora, 90, artist
- 28 August – Andrew Hughes, 62, police officer
- 30 August – Peter Corris, 76, crime novelist
- 31 August –
  - Brian Davis, 84, Queensland politician
  - Ian Jones, 86, author, television writer and director

=== September ===
- 2 September – Conway Savage, 58, musician (Nick Cave and the Bad Seeds)
- 3 September – Ian Hampshire, 70, Australian rules footballer
- 5 September – Dennis Green, 87, canoeist
- 7 September – Donald Robinson, 95, Anglican archbishop
- 12 September –
  - Barry Cunningham, 78, politician
  - Albert Ullin, 88, children's bookseller
- 16 September –
  - Jim Kettle, 93, Australian rules footballer
  - John Molony, 91, historian, academic and author
  - Michael Young, 59, Australian rules footballer
- 18 September – Moi-Yo Miller, 104, illusionist and magic assistant
- 22 September – Damian Hill, 42, actor and screenwriter (Pawno)
- 28 September – Bob Jane, 88, former race car driver and prominent businessman

=== October ===
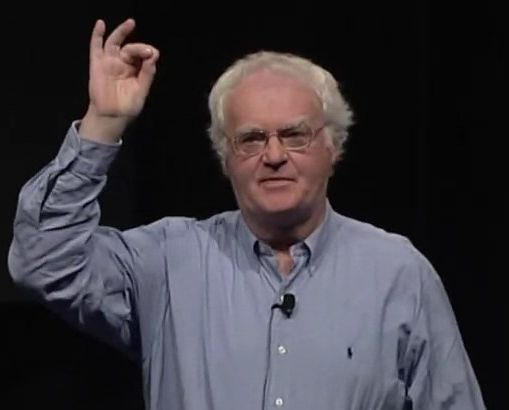
Richard Gill at TEDx Sydney 2011

- 2 October – Ron Casey, 89, broadcaster
- 5 October –
  - Frank Drum, 87, Australian rules football player (Richmond)
  - John Deeble, 87, health economist
- 6 October –
  - Quentin Kenihan, 43, disability advocate and actor
  - James Cowan, 76, novelist, poet and nonfiction writer
- 10 October – Bill Corey, 101, soldier, Rat of Tobruk
- 12 October – Pat Leane, 88, track and field athlete
- 16 October –
  - Ian Kiernan, 78, yachtsman and environmental campaigner (Clean Up Australia)
  - Margaret Thorsborne, 91, naturalist, conservationist and environmental activist
- 17 October – Gordon Maitland, 92, general
- 18 October – Jeff Hallebone, 89, cricketer
- 19 October –
  - Tom Meehan, 92, Australian rules football player
  - Darren Stewart, 52, association footballer and manager
- 21 October – Eleanor Witcombe, 95, screenwriter and playwright
- 22 October – Anne Fairbairn, 90, poet, journalist and expert in Arab culture
- 23 October – Todd Reid, 34, tennis player
- 24 October –
  - Dame Beryl Beaurepaire, 95, philanthropist
  - John D. Lamond, 71, filmmaker
- 28 October –
  - Richard Gill, 76, conductor
  - Colin Sylvia, 32, Australian rules football player (Melbourne, Fremantle)

=== November ===
- 6 November –
  - Jonathan Cantwell, 36, racing cyclist
  - Ted Mack, 84, politician
  - Cliffs of Moher, 4, racehorse
- 8 November – Murray Wilcox, 81, Federal Court judge
- 15 November – Ann Symonds, 79, politician
- 19 November – Larry Pickering, 76, cartoonist
- 22 November – Judith Rodriguez, 82, poet
- 23 November – Stan Perron, 96, businessman
- 26 November – Bonita Mabo, 75, indigenous activist

=== December ===
- 1 December – Judy McBurney, 70, actress
- 9 December – Gordon Scholes, 87, Labor MP 1967–1993
- 26 December – Penny Cook, 61, actress

== See also ==
- 2018 in Australian television
- List of Australian films of 2018
