= List of mass shootings in Australia =

This article is a list of mass shootings in Australia. Mass shootings are firearm-related violence with at least four casualties. Excluded are shootings associated with acts of war, such as the 1944 Cowra breakout, which saw over 200 soldiers killed. Also excluded are massacres of Aboriginal people using firearms, most of which are not well-documented.

The data includes casualties of perpetrators, including self-inflicted gunshot wounds or the shooting of a perpetrator by police. That treatment of perpetrator casualties is at variance with some but not all definitions of a mass shooting used in the United States. The inclusion of injured victims in the data is also at variance with some of the US definitions that only include dead victims. However, the above treatment is consistent with that used in other Wikipedia lists of mass shootings by country.

== 21st century ==
Date	Location	Dead	Injured	Total	Description
24 October 2026	Loganholme, Queensland	1	3	4	2026 Logan pub shooting. A drive-by style shooting, believed to be targeted, following a boxing tournament. A 19-year-old woman who was shot in the head and died later in hospital, three others were injured.
19 May 2026	Canley Heights, New South Wales	1	4	5	Two men shot and killed one man and injured four others in a targeted attack believed to be organised crime-related.
22 January 2026	Lake Cargelligo, New South Wales	5 (Note: Including the perpetrator or suspect)	1	6	2026 Lake Cargelligo shootings: Julian Ingram shot and killed pregnant Sophie Quinn, John Harris, Nerida Quinn and injured Kaleb McQueen before later shooting himself
14 December 2025	Bondi Beach, Sydney, New South Wales	16	41	57	2025 Bondi Beach shooting: Two gunmen opened fire on a Hanukkah event at Bondi Beach in Sydney, killing 15 people and wounding 40 more. One of the perpetrators was killed in a shootout with police, while the other was injured and arrested.
5 October 2025	Croydon Park, Sydney, New South Wales	0	18	18	A man opened fire from a restaurant rooftop onto Georges River Road at passing vehicles, including police vehicles, injuring 17 people, before being arrested. Paramedics treated 16 people at the scene for minor injuries, one man underwent surgery at Royal Prince Alfred Hospital for gunshot wounds to his chest and neck and the alleged gunman was taken to Bankstown Hospital for minor injuries.
12 December 2022	Wieambilla, Queensland	6	2	8	Wieambilla police shootings: A Police wellness check gone wrong, left six people dead including three perpetrators (two men and one woman). Two more people were wounded.
4 August 2022	Bogie, Queensland	3	1	4	A man shot four members of the same family, killing three and seriously wounding one.
4 June 2019	Darwin, Northern Territory	4	1	5	2019 Darwin shooting: A man shot five people with a pump-action shotgun, killing four and wounding one.
14 April 2019	Melbourne, Victoria	2	4	6	2019 Melbourne nightclub shooting: A drive-by shooting by two men left two people dead and four wounded.
11 May 2018	Osmington, Western Australia	7	0	7	Osmington shooting: A man shot dead his wife, daughter, and four grandchildren, before committing suicide.
5 June 2017	Brighton, Victoria	2	3	5	2017 Brighton siege: A man shot and killed one person and then held a hostage. In a subsequent shoot-out with a police tactical unit, the perpetrator was killed and three police officers were wounded.
7 March 2016	Ingleburn, New South Wales	2	2	4	A man armed with a rifle shot and killed one person and wounded two others, before taking his own life.
16 December 2014	Sydney, New South Wales	3	4	7	Lindt Cafe siege: Three people were killed and four others were wounded during a police raid at a café where a man was holding hostages.
8 September 2014	Lockhart, New South Wales	5	0	5	A man shot and killed his wife and three children with a shotgun before committing suicide.
26 April 2013	Smithfield, New South Wales	0	4	4	A shooting incident at a residence left four men wounded.
29 April 2011	Hectorville, South Australia	3	3	6	2011 Hectorville siege: A shooting incident and the following stand-off with the police left three people killed and three others wounded.
10 April 2010	Roxburgh Park, Victoria	4	0	4	A man shot and killed his three children and himself.
18 May 2009	Jandakot, Western Australia	0	4	4	A gang-related shootout left four people wounded.
2 June 2007	Adelaide, South Australia	0	4	4	A shooting incident at Tonic nightclub in Light Square left at least four people wounded.
31 October 2005	Fairfield, New South Wales	1	3	4	A 29-year-old man was shot dead and three others were wounded in a shooting at Babylon Cafe in the Civic Centre Arcade.
20 March 2005	Oakhampton Heights, New South Wales	4	0	4	A 32-year-old woman armed with a rifle shot and killed her husband, two children and herself.
21 October 2002	Melbourne, Victoria	2	5	7	Monash University shooting: A male international student shot and killed two students and wounded five others including the lecturer.
26 May 2002	Cabramatta, New South Wales	0	7	7	A man opened fire with a handgun at a wedding party, wounding seven people.

== 20th century ==
Date	Location	Dead	Injured	Total	Description
10 October 1999	Adelaide, South Australia	3	2	5	A gang-related shooting left three people killed and two others wounded. The case remains unsolved.
3 October 1999	Bendigo, Victoria	1	4	5	A man shot and wounded four police officers during a 19-hour stand-off, before committing suicide.
3 August 1999	Acacia Hills, Northern Territory	2	3	5	A 12-hour shooting spree left two people dead and three others wounded. The gunman was among the killed.
22 February 1999	Wollongong, New South Wales	1	9	10	1999 Keira Street Shooting: A man opened fire in front of a nightclub with a double-barreled sawn-off shotgun, killing one man and wounding nine others.
10 November 1997	Chippendale, New South Wales	3	1	4	A gang-related shooting at Blackmarket Cafe nightclub left three men killed and another man wounded.
31 August 1997	Mackay, Queensland	0	5	5	A shootout between rival bikie gangs left five people wounded.
1 June 1996	Palmerston, Northern Territory	0	6	6	An intoxicated man fired at police officers, wounding four and a bystander. The gunman was shot in the arm by police and arrested.
28 April 1996	Port Arthur, Tasmania	35	24	59	Port Arthur massacre: A man shot and killed 35 people and wounded 23 others during a shooting spree.
25 January 1996	Hillcrest, Queensland	7	0	7	Hillcrest shooting: A man shot dead his estranged wife, three children, and parents-in-law before committing suicide.
22 October 1995	Prospect, Tasmania	0	4	4	A 17-year-old shot and wounded four police officers before fleeing. He was later arrested and charged with five counts of attempted murder.
5 December 1994	Fawkner, Victoria	3	3	6	A man opened fire on people and passing vehicles, killing two people and wounding three others. He was shot and killed by police.
21 June 1994	Khancoban, New South Wales	1	3	4	A woman was killed and three other people were wounded at a holiday resort. A suspect surrendered at the scene.
26 August 1993	Burwood/Redfern, New South Wales	3	1	4	A man shot and killed two of his roommates before shooting his landlord to death at another location. The gunman was shot by police during a car chase and arrested.
27 October 1992	Central Coast, New South Wales	6	1	7	Central Coast massacre: A man armed with a 12-gauge pump-action shotgun shot and killed six people and wounded another.
17 August 1991	Strathfield, New South Wales	8	6	14	Strathfield massacre: A man armed with a semi-automatic rifle shot and killed seven people and wounded six others at a shopping mall, before committing suicide.
5 January 1991	Camp Hill, Queensland	4	0	4	A man shot and killed three family members and himself.
3 October 1990	Deniliquin, New South Wales	4	0	4	A man shot and killed his wife and two children before committing suicide.
30 August 1990	Surry Hills, New South Wales	5	0	5	A man armed with a 12-gauge shotgun killed five people at a public housing precinct before surrendering to police.
7 April 1990	Burleigh Heads, Queensland	1	8	9	A Satanist shot at passing cars with a rifle, killing one person and wounding seven others before being shot by police and arrested.
12 March 1990	Perth, Western Australia	4	0	4	A man shot and killed his wife and two children before committing suicide.
7 November 1989	Carrathool, New South Wales	2	2	4	A man shot four people at a remote house, killing two.
25 September 1988	Molgawo Arnhem Land near Gunbalanya, Northern Territory	5	0	5	A man shot and killed his wife, his two children and his in-laws.
5 February 1988	Patterson Lakes, Victoria	4	0	4	A man shot and killed his wife and two children before killing himself.
27 December 1987	Winkie, South Australia	3	1	4	A mentally ill fruit grower shot at relatives and co-workers, killing three people and wounding another before fleeing.
8 December 1987	Melbourne, Victoria	9	5	14	Queen Street massacre: A man armed with a rifle shot and killed eight people and wounded five others. He committed suicide by leaping from an 11th-floor window.
10 October 1987	Canley Vale, New South Wales	6	1	7	Canley Vale shootings: A man shot five people to death before killing himself. The victims were a woman who had rejected the perpetrator and gotten engaged to another man, her mother, father, brother and sister. Another brother was injured.
9 August 1987	Clifton Hill, Victoria	7	19	26	Hoddle Street massacre: A man armed with several firearms shot and killed seven people and wounded nineteen others.
23 January 1987	Pymble, New South Wales	4	0	4	Pymble shooting: A man went to the family home of his former girlfriend, shot her and three others.
12 February 1986	Canberra, Australian Capital Territory	4	1	5	A man shot and killed his common-law wife and her parents and wounded her brother. The man returned home and committed suicide.
2 September 1984	Milperra, New South Wales	7	28	35	Milperra massacre: A gunfight between rival motorcycle gang members left seven people killed and twenty-eight injured.
1 June 1984	Wahroonga, New South Wales	6	0	6	Wahroonga murders: A man shot dead his wife, three children and his mother, before killing himself.
3 March 1982	Tweed Heads, New South Wales	7	0	7	A man armed with a semi-automatic rifle shot and killed a family of six before committing suicide.
24 September 1981	Campsie, New South Wales	6	1	7	A man shot his wife and five children with a pair of rifles before committing suicide. One of the children survived.
21 May 1980	Melbourne, Victoria	3	2	5	A man opened fire at the Supreme Court of Victoria, killing three people and wounding two others before being arrested.
14 October 1979	South Yarra, Victoria	0	4	4	A man shot and wounded four people at a theatre. The perpetrator later walked into Camberwell Police Station and gave himself up.
22 September 1976	Spring Hill, Brisbane	2	4	6	1976 Spring Hill shooting: A man shot two dead and wounded four others on Boundary Street, Spring Hill, Brisbane in a random shooting. He was captured by heavily armed police later at a house where he was holding 5 people hostage.
12 November 1975	Toowoomba, Queensland	6	0	6	A depressed man used a .22-calibre rifle to kill his wife, three sons and a daughter, before committing suicide.
6 September 1971	Hope Forest, South Australia	10	0	10	Hope Forest shooting: A man shot dead his wife, their seven children, his wife's sister-in-law and her son with a .22-calibre rifle.
15 December 1969	Greenwich, New South Wales	3	1	4	A Finnish immigrant killed his wife and daughter and wounded his son before shooting himself.
17 June 1963	Aldinga, South Australia	5	0	5	A man, his wife, and their three children were found dead of gunshot wounds at their home, with a suicide note found.
28 June 1962	Collingwood, Victoria	4	0	4	Four people were found shot dead at a home. A 26-year-old man surrendered the following day.
26 December 1961	Tarampa, Queensland	2	2	4	A 17-year-old stole a rifle and went on a shooting spree at multiple farmhouses, targeting people and animals. A married couple was killed and two other people were wounded, with multiple animals also shot dead.
24 July 1959	Shepparton, Victoria	0	5	5	An Italian man armed with a shotgun shot and wounded four people including a police constable. He was arrested after accidentally shooting himself.
18 February 1957	Cannon Hill, Queensland	7	1	8	A man shot and killed six people and wounded another one before committing suicide. The perpetrator first battered his wife and daughter to death and set them on fire, before taking his gun to a house across the street to kill a friend's wife, two children and a family friend.
25 February 1956	Moe, Victoria	4	0	4	A Scottish migrant who had recently separated from his wife shot and killed his three children and himself at their home.
6 August 1955	Ivanhoe East, Victoria	2	4	6	A man shot and killed one person and wounded four others with a pistol before committing suicide.
13 October 1952	Richmond, Victoria	2	2	4	A man went to his neighbor's house and killed a woman, wounded her daughter and her husband before killing himself nearby.
1 August 1951	Beenak, Victoria	4	0	4	A man shot and killed his sister and brother-in-law before walking to a post office, killing another sister, and killing himself.
2 July 1948	Glen Innes, New South Wales	6	0	6	A man shot and killed his six children before being arrested and sentenced to death.
29 August 1946	Waterloo, New South Wales	3	3	6	Two people were killed and four others wounded at a house known for underworld crime. Nine people were arrested. A third victim died on 9 September.
17 September 1945	Paddington, New South Wales	2	2	4	Two people were killed and two others were wounded in a home.
29 October 1938	Frankston, Victoria	1	3	4	A man shot and wounded three people with a pistol at a dance hall before killing himself. One of the wounded girls had previously rejected the perpetrator's romantic gestures, which had led to the perpetrator making threats to shoot her.
21 August 1931	Perth, Western Australia	7	0	7	A man shot and killed his wife and five children before committing suicide.
18 July 1930	Nailsworth, South Australia	2	4	6	After four convicts escaped Yatala Labour Prison, they were pursued by police in a running gunfight and eventually crashed opposite the Nailsworth School. Shots were fired between the prisoners and police in the schoolyard. In total, two perpetrators were killed and two officers and two civilians were wounded.
30 September 1929	Palmyra, Western Australia	3	4	7	A retired farmer shot and wounded four people at a house before killing two other people and himself.
1 November 1928	Rockdale, New South Wales	4	1	5	A man entered a home and started firing, killing two women and wounding two other people before attempting suicide. The perpetrator and a victim later died of their wounds.
19 July 1928	Bendigo, Victoria	4	0	4	A man killed three people (his wife and two others) in a house before setting the home on fire and committing suicide.
14 January 1927	Kyogle, New South Wales	0	4	4	Four people (three men and one woman) were shot and wounded in a targeted attack. Five men were arrested, including one of the injured.
4 September 1926	Bundaberg, Queensland	3	2	5	A man killed his two children and father-in-law, attempted to kill his wife and wounded one other person with a revolver before walking outside and being arrested.
30 August 1926	Sydney, New South Wales	5	0	5	Five people were killed in a domestic violence incident. A father shot his wife, three children, and himself.
14 December 1924	near Cessnock, New South Wales	1	3	4	A man walked around firing at people, wounding three before committing suicide.
10 February 1924	Jingellic, New South Wales	1	3	4	A man shot into a crowd at a picnic, killing one person and wounding three others.
23 January 1924	Melbourne, Victoria	4	1	5	Botanic Gardens massacre: A man opened fire at a botanical garden with a rifle, killing four and wounding one. He later killed himself at another location.
22 March 1921	Riverton, South Australia	2	3	5	A man armed with a revolver shot and wounded five people at Riverton railway station. Two of the victims, including MP Percy Brookfield, died of their wounds.
1–2 June 1919	Sydney, New South Wales	2	16	18	A Chinese man armed with two revolvers and smoke bombs opened fire at random as he roamed the streets, fatally shooting one person and wounding sixteen people. He was killed by an armed citizen.
1914, 1916 or 1918	Bentick Island, Queensland	11	Unknown	11+	A settler identified as John McKenzie alledgedly shot any Kaiadilt people he encountered.
1 January 1915	Broken Hill, New South Wales	6	7	13	Battle of Broken Hill: Two men shot dead four people and wounded seven more before being killed by police and military officers.
2 May 1913	Ballarat, Victoria	2	2	4	A man shot his wife and two children, killing one, before committing suicide.
25 September 1912	Alexandria, New South Wales	0	4	4	A man shot and wounded three people in the street before being injured and arrested.
17 July 1912	Shark Bay, Western Australia	3	2	5	A Filipino seaman shot and killed two people and wounded two others before being shot dead.
16 November 1911	Mackay, Queensland	4	0	4	Ching family murders: A man killed a family of six. Four of the victims were killed with firearms.
29 June 1907	Richmond, Queensland	1	7	8	A man fired from a wagon at people, killing one person and wounding six others. The shooter was wounded and arrested.
6 October 1903	Hay, New South Wales	0	4	4	A teenager carrying a shotgun shot and wounded four children, allegedly by accident.

== 19th century ==
Date	Location	Dead	Injured	Total	Description
8 February 1898	Glen Osmond, South Australia	4	1	5	A man armed with a revolver shot and killed his wife and two children, wounded another child and then committed suicide.
19 December 1897	Ashfield, New South Wales	0	4	4	Four children were shot and wounded as they trespassed. A man was remanded into custody.
17 August 1888	South Terrace, Adelaide, South Australia	4	0	4	A man shot and killed his three children and himself.
3 January 1871	Forest Reefs, New South Wales	3	1	4	A man shot and killed his wife, mother-in-law and father-in-law, and wounded another person, during a domestic violence incident.
9 January 1867	Jindera, New South Wales	4	0	4	A gang of men tied up and then shot and killed four police special constables.

== See also ==
- Crime in Australia
- List of terrorist incidents in Australia
- Timeline of major crimes in Australia
