= List of rampage killers in Oceania and Maritime Southeast Asia =

This is a list of mass killers or spree killers in Oceania and Maritime Southeast Asia. A mass murderer is typically defined as someone who kills three or more people in one incident, with no "cooling off" period, not including themselves. A mass murder typically occurs in a single location where one or more persons kill several others.

This list does not include serial killers or major figures in politics and government who orchestrated such actions.

Some perpetrators may not have committed their acts as it is unclear if they were convicted.

== Rampage killers ==
| Accused perpetrator | Date | Year | Location | Country | Killed | Injured | W | Additional notes | Ref. |
|---|---|---|---|---|---|---|---|---|---|
| Butaog, Mangayanon (Note: At least three of the victims were relatives of the assailant.) | 9 Sep | 1985 | Sinasa | Philippines | 67 | 0 | MP | Committed suicide | |
| Brenton Tarrant, 28 | 15 March | 2019 | Christchurch | New Zealand | 51 | 89 | F | Subdued by police | |
| Carlos, Jessie Javier , 42 | 2 June | 2017 | Pasay, Metropolitan Manila | Philippines | 39 | 70 | FA | The perpetrator committed suicide. The perpetrator killed two of the victims just hours before the main attack. | |
| Martin Bryant, 28 | 28/29 April | 1996 | Port Arthur, Tasmania | Australia | 35 | 23 | FMA | Sentenced to 35 concurrent life terms plus 1,035 years | |
| Unknown (Note: Unconfirmed event.) | | | Siquijor | Philippines | 32 | ? | M | Killed by angry mob | |
| Unknown | | 1903 | Mindanao | Philippines | 23 | ? | M | Killed | |
| Wirjo, 42 (Note: At least one of the victims was a relative of the assailant.) | 14/15 April | 1987 | Banjarsari & Boyolangu | Indonesia | 20 | 13 | M | Committed suicide | |
| Arsenio Formentera, 31 | 28 January | 1968 | Palompon | Philippines | 17 | ? | M | | |
| Sanurip | 15 April | 1996 | Timika | Indonesia | 16 | 11 | F | | |
| Hodeng | 17 June | 1879 | Tankulu | Indonesia | 16 | 1 | | Arrested | |
| Domingo Salazar, 42 | 11 October | 1956 | Palawan | Philippines | 16 | 1 | M | Subdued by police | |
| Sajid Nakram, Naveed Akram | 14 December | 2025 | Bondi Beach | Australia | 15 | 40 | FE | Sajid was killed; Naveed was shot and injured | |
| Unknown | 13 Dec | 1873 | Ternate | Indonesia | 15 | 4 | M | Killed | |
| Basobas, Florentino | 9 May | 1977 | Quezon, Palawan | Philippines | 15 | 4 | M | Killed | |
| Antakin | 27 May | 1897 | North Borneo | Malaysia | 15 | 3 | M | Shot and killed | |
| Long, Robert Paul, 38 | 23/28 June | 2000 | Childers, Queensland | Australia | 15 | 2+ | MA | Sentenced to life imprisonment | |
| Pusok Anak Ngaik, 28 | 29 May | 1965 | Sandakan | Malaysia | 14 | 4 | M | | |
| Unknown | March | 1909 | Borneo | Indonesia | 14 | ? | | | |
| Unknown | Nov | 1935 | Gondang | Indonesia | 13 | 3 | | Sentenced to life imprisonment | |
| Gray, David Malcolm, 33 | 13/14 Nov | 1990 | Aramoana | New Zealand | 13 | 3 | F A | Killed by police | |
| Kalinga Boli | 25 May - 6 June | 1937 | Nagan | Philippines | 13 | 0 | M | Captured by police | |
| Two unknown men | 22 June | 1952 | Zamboanga | Philippines | 12 | 14 | M | One killed, other wounded and captured | |
| Unknown | July | 1933 | Palembang | | 12 | 12 | F | Arrested | |
| Rebasien | | 1856 | Napal Malientang | Indonesia | 12 | 7–10 | | Killed | |
| Unknown | 16 May | 1890 | Bonthain | Indonesia | 12 | 4+ | M | Killed | |
| Rublico, Salvador | 13 Nov | 1952 | Banga, Aklan | Philippines | 11–12 | 4 | M | Killed | |
| Mat Taram bin Sa'al, 30 | 9 Oct | 1947 | Bangi | Malaysia | 11 | 10 | M | Found not guilty by reason of insanity | |
| Leman | January | 1933 | Palembang | Indonesia | 11 | 2 | M | Arrested | |
| Unknown corporal | 25 July | 1967 | Jakarta | Indonesia | 11 | 2 | F | Arrested | |
| Dean, Kingsley, Roger, 37 | 18 Nov | 2011 | Sydney | Australia | 11 | 0 | A | Found guilty and sentenced to life imprisonment with out parole | |
| Danilo Guades, 37 | 2 June | 2007 | Samar | Philippines | 10 | 17 | M | Arrested | |
| Hajula | 22 Feb | 1932 | Malita | Philippines | 10 | 10 | F | Killed | |
| Ibrahim | 4 June | 1901 | Little Cross Street, Arab Street | Singapore | 10 | 7 | M | Killed by a villager | |
| Raden Prawiro Direjo | 23 Sep | 1863 | Salatiga | Indonesia | 10 | 6 | M | Killed | |
| O. L., 30 | 8 Feb | 1988 | Cianjur Regency | Indonesia | 10 | 2 | M | Arrested | |
| Unknown | 7 April | 2007 | Silangkan | Philippines | 10 | 1 | F | Killed by soldiers | |
| Unknown | | 1881 | Dai | Indonesia | 10 | ? | | Killed | |
| Junak | 19 Sep | 1960 | Seriang | Indonesia | 10 | ? | | Killed | |
| Two unknown men | 5 Nov | 1923 | S.S. Van Linschoten | Philippines | 9 | 19 | | Both were killed | |
| Kulop Mas Daud | 9 May | 1927 | Kati | Malaysia | 9 | 12 | F | Killed by police | |
| Contaoe, Marciano, 32 (Note: Assailant was a member of the military, police, or a comparable force at the time of the rampage.) | 21 May | 1988 | Manila | Philippines | 9 | 3 | F | Sentenced to 300 years in prison | |
| Sunan | 8 July | 1846 | Penang | Malaysia | 9 | 2 | M | Sentenced to death and executed | |
| Governor, Jimmy, 25 | 20/26 July | 1900 | New South Wales | Australia | 9 | 1 | FM | Sentenced to death and executed | |
| Idrus Bin Hassan, 62 | 7/8 Feb | 1973 | Kampong Batu Titian Akar | Malaysia | 8–9 | 3–4 | FM | Killed by police | |
| Rotang | 25 Oct | 1939 | Jakarta | Indonesia | 8 | 28 | M | Killed | |
| Mendoza, Rolando del Rosario, 55 | 23 Aug | 2010 | Manila | Philippines | 8 | 9 | F | Killed by police | |
| Toling, Antonio, 47; Toling, Jose, 47 | 8 Jan | 1965 | Santa Rosa | Philippines | 8 | 7 | M | Both were sentenced to death Four more died by jumping out of the train | |
| de Fiesta, Bernabe, 38 | 18 May | 2008 | Calamba | Philippines | 8 | 6 | F | Killed by police Killed a dog and two cows | |
| Unknown | 31 Oct | 1925 | Steamboat "Klang" | Malaysia | 8 | 5 | M | Killed by police | |
| Vitkovic, Frank, 22 | 8 Dec | 1987 | Melbourne | Australia | 8 | 5 | F | Committed suicide | |
| Unknown | 5 Sep | 1881 | Bunging | Philippines | 8 | 2 | | Killed | |
| Sacopla, Andres, 48 | 4 Sep | 1972 | Cabayugan | Philippines | 8 | 2 | F | Killed | |
| Gallo, Bemon, 20 (Note: All the victims were killed in the same household.) | 17 Dec | 2000 | Bacolod | Philippines | 8 | 1 | FM | Sentenced to 200 years in prison | |
| Unknown | 6 Sep | 1929 | Himatangi | New Zealand | 8 | 0 | F A | Unsolved | |
| Two unknown men | 18/19 Feb | 1933 | Batubatu | Philippines | 7–8 | 3 | | Both were killed | |
| Jonathan Moreño | 16 Jan | 2005 | Kalibo | Philippines | 7 | 33 | F | Arrested, diagnosed psychotic | |
| Sidin | | 1913 | Banda Aceh | Indonesia | 7 | ≈20 | M | Sentenced to 20 years in prison | |
| Knight, Julian, 19 | 9 Aug | 1987 | Melbourne | Australia | 7 | 19 | F | Sentenced to life imprisonment | |
| Bae, Ronald Baquiran, 41 | 4 Jan | 2013 | Tabon 1 | Philippines | 7 | 12 | F | Killed by police Also killed a dog Terminated a pregnancy Killed a man in 2003 | |
| Abuloc, Ernesto H., 40 | 31 March | 1977 | Zamboanga City | Philippines | 7 | 9–14 | F | Sentenced to death | |
| Frankum, Wade John, 33 | 17 Aug | 1991 | Sydney | Australia | 7 | 6 | FM | Committed suicide | |
| Ambulo, Marcial A. Rubio, Jobe P., 40 | 3 April | 2000 | Victoria, Oriental Mindoro | Philippines | 7 | 2 | F | Both were sentenced to 139 years in prison | |
| Suku (Note: All the victims were killed in the same household.) | 22/23 May | 1930 | Nariara | Fiji | 7 | 0 | MA | Sentenced to death | |
| Graham, Eric Stanley George, 40 | 8/9 Oct | 1941 | Koiterangi | New Zealand | 7 | 0 | F | Killed by police | |
| Dumunlag, Mariano | 15 Jan | 1989 | Sumilao, Bukidnon | Philippines | 7 | ? | F | Committed suicide | |
| Unknown | 25 Nov | 1860 | Baru | Indonesia | 6–9 | 0–1 | MA | Killed by angry mob | |
| Cabisada, Ramon | 3/4 May | 1989 | Upper Gusa & Lower Gusa | Philippines | 6–8 | 14–24 | F | Committed suicide | |
| Unknown | 27 Sep | 1922 | Pasar Babaan | Indonesia | 6–7 | 7–11 | M | Killed by police | |
| Gargasoulas, Dimitrious, 26 | 18/20 Jan | 2017 | Melbourne | Australia | 6 | 27 | MO | Sentenced to life imprisonment | |
| Jafaar Patola, 32 | 11 Oct | 1981 | Kampung Parit Setan | Malaysia | 6 | 25 | M | Killed by police | |
| Anang | 27 May | 1899 | Steamboat "Sri Pontianak" | Indonesia | 6 | 13 | M | Killed | |
| Cauchi, Joel, 40 | 13 April | 2024 | Sydney | Australia | 6 | 12 | M | killed by police | |
| de la Pena, Domingo | 2 June | 1989 | Catbalogan | Philippines | 6 | 8 | M | Killed by police | |
| Unknown | 30 Sep | 1936 | Pacitan | Indonesia | 6 | 4 | M | Killed by police | |
| Anderson, Stephen Lawrence, 24 | 8 Feb | 1997 | Raurimu | New Zealand | 6 | 4 | F | Found not guilty by reason of insanity | |
| Molina, Ruel, 31 | 20 Dec | 2014 | Kimantong | Philippines | 6 | 1–3 | MA | Killed by police | |
| Majka, Marian Ryszard, 35 (Note: At least one of the victims was a relative of the assailant.) | 18 Feb | 1957 | Brisbane, Queensland | Australia | 6 | 1 | FMA | Committed suicide | |
| Chang Yee Loong, 32 | 2 Nov | 2000 | Miri | Malaysia | 6 | 1 | M | Found not guilty by reason of insanity | |
| Baker, Malcolm George, 45 (Note: At least one of the victims was a relative of the assailant.) | 27 Oct | 1992 | Terrigal, Bateau Bay & Wyong, New South Wales | Australia | 6 | 1 | F | Sentenced to life imprisonment Terminated a pregnancy | |
| Arnatis Otao, Renie | 19 March | 2014 | Labangon | Philippines | 6 | 1 | M | Killed | |
| Posidio, Rufino B., 26 (Note: All the victims were killed in the same household.) | 14 Jan | 1960 | Manila | Philippines | 6 | 0 | F | Committed suicide | |
| Silva, George David, 27 (Note: All the victims were members of the same family.) | 17 Nov | 1911 | Mackay, Queensland | Australia | 6 | 0 | FM | Sentenced to death and executed | |
| Layton, Philip Eric, 21 | 3 March | 1982 | Tweed Heads | Australia | 6 | 0 | F | Committed suicide | |
| Grefaldia, Edgardo | 18 Oct | 1988 | De La Paz | Philippines | 6 | 0 | F | Sentenced to life imprisonment | |
| Unknown | 22 Oct | 1641 | "Coster" | Indonesia | 6 | ? | M | Killed; One man accidentally shot himself dead | |
| Unknown | | 1881 | Timor | Indonesia | 6 | ? | | Killed by angry mob | |
| Unknown | 8 Jan | 1971 | Iligan City | Philippines | 6 | ? | M | Killed by police | |
| Crabbe, Douglas John Edwin, 36 | 18 Aug | 1983 | Yulara, Northern Territory | Australia | 5 | 16 | V | Sentenced to life imprisonment | |
| Unknown | 15 June | 1920 | Tanro Kassi | Indonesia | 5 | 13 | | Killed by his brother-in-law | |
| Unknown | | 1875 | Little Dewakan | Indonesia | 5 | 10 | | Killed | |
| Saleng Bin Sulemang | 22 March | 1956 | Lajang | Indonesia | 5 | 10 | M | Killed by angry mob | |
| Jaya | 21 March | 1909 | Tranum | Malaysia | 5 | 8 | M | Killed by police | |
| Saidoong | 27 July | 1862 | Malayu | Indonesia | 5 | 7 | M | Killed by angry mob | |
| Fajardo, Jose | 25 June | 1976 | Cebu City | Philippines | 5 | 7 | M | Committed suicide | |
| Unknown | Feb | 1967 | | Philippines | 5 | 5 | | | |
| Wiremu Kīngi Maketū | 20 Nov | 1841 | Motuarohia Island | New Zealand | 5 | 0 | M | Sentenced to death and executed | |
| Nantjo, 35 | 3 Oct | 2004 | Kalora | Indonesia | 4 | 14 | M | Killed by angry mob | |
| Unknown | 18 Sep | 1856 | Makassar | Indonesia | 4 | 9 | | Killed | |
| Dueh | 21 July | 1883 | Sungi Limtah Undup | Malaysia | 4 | 9 | M | Killed | |
| Mamat Ayam | 20 Jan | 1925 | Kuala Terengganu | Malaysia | 4 | 9 | MA | Killed by police | |
| Padang; Luni | | 1860 | Negara Nabung | Indonesia | 4 | 8 | M | Both died | |
| Li Zhongren, 42 | 20 Nov | 2009 | Saipan | Northern Mariana Islands | 4 | 8 | F | Committed suicide | |
| Taotomo | 30 April | 1876 | Sumenep | Indonesia | 4 | 7 | M | Committed suicide while awaiting trial | |
| Valencia, Melecio | 28 Nov | 1927 | Dingras, Ilocos Norte | Philippines | 4 | 7 | | Killed by police | |
| Unknown | Sep | 1932 | Galesong | Indonesia | 4 | 7 | | Killed | |
| Tan Bon Soa | 17 Sep | 1910 | Asahan Sultanate | Indonesia | 4 | 6–7 | | Committed suicide while awaiting trial | |
| Unknown | 7 Aug | 1923 | Bujungtangaya | Indonesia | 4 | 6 | | Killed | |
| Zabala, Jose, 47 | 27 Sep | 1955 | | Philippines | 4 | 6 | | Killed | |
| Richard Forman, Colin, 23 | 5 Jan | 1977 | Alice Springs Airport | Australia | 4 | 4 | V | Died in the crash | |
| Unknown | 27 April | 1916 | Panji | Indonesia | 3 | 30 | | Killed by angry mob | |
| "Rod" and "Nash" | 22 Jun | 2026 | Tacloban | Philippines | 3 | 20 | M | Both Arrested | |
| Barizo, Fernando | 8 June | 1987 | Ragay | Philippines | 3 | 19 | M | Killed by angry mob | |
| Unknown | 8 Oct | 1881 | Wonosobo | Indonesia | 3 | 12 | MA | Killed | |
| Unknown, 14 | 12 June | 1909 | Binjey | Indonesia | 3 | 11–13 | M | Sentenced to 20 years in prison Also stabbed three horses | |
| Unknown | Dec | 1966 | | Philippines | 3 | 9 | | Killed by police | |
| Two unknown men | April | 1967 | Palawan | Philippines | 3 | 5 | M | Killed by police | |
| Chao-Tiao Yumol, 38 | 23 Dec | 2022 | Quezon City | Philippines | 3 | 3 | M | Sentenced to life in prison | |
| Hirosi, Justin, 43 | 23 Dec | 2003 | Airai | Palau | 3 | 1 | M | Sentenced to life in prison | |
| Lim Beng Hai Michael Tan Teow | 28 Mar | 1983 | Geylang Bahru | Singapore | 3 | 0 | M | Sentenced to death | |
| Unknown | April | 1967 | | Philippines | 2 | 6 | M | Killed by police | |

== Familicides ==
The victims must have been majority the relatives of the perpetrator to be considered a familicide.

| Perpetrator | Date | Year | Location | Country | Killed | Injured | W | Additional Notes | Ref. |
|---|---|---|---|---|---|---|---|---|---|
| Andangan* | 21 Oct | 1921 | Cotabato | Philippines | 11 | 0 | M | Committed suicide | |
| Bartholomew, Clifford Cecil, 40* | 6 Sep | 1971 | Hope Forest, South Australia | Australia | 10 | 0 | FM | Sentenced to death; commuted to life imprisonment; released after seven years | |
| Ratima, Raymond Wahia, 25 | 26 June | 1992 | Masterton | New Zealand | 7 | 2 | M | Sentenced to life imprisonment Terminated a pregnancy | |
| Ngah Ghafur | 14 Dec | 1898 | Bota | Malaysia | 7 | 1 | MA | Sentenced to death and executed | |
| Pagkay, Gardo, 25* | 22 July | 1968 | Cotabato City | Philippines | 7 | 0 | M | Committed suicide | |
| Imam Mamat, 40 | 11/13 Feb | 1891 | Pasir Garam | Malaysia | 6 | 4 | M | Killed; Terminated two pregnancies | |
| Yang Tai Chong, 21* | 6/7 March | 1966 | | Singapore | 6 | 4 | M | Found not guilty by reason of insanity | |
| Ong Kok, 34* | 11 Sep | 1930 | Tampines | Singapore | 6 | 2 | M | Committed suicide | |
| Angeles, Vicente, 31* | 19 May | 1957 | Manila | Philippines | 6 | 1 | F | Committed suicide | |
| Sornsung, Sucheep, 41 (สุชีพ ศรสังข์) | 1 Jan | 2019 | Phato District | Thailand | 6 | 1 | F | Committed suicide | |
| Thyer, Joseph, 44* | 11 Oct | 1896 | Cavanagh, South Australia | Australia | 6 | 0 | M | Committed suicide | |
| Glover, Catherine Mary, 34* | 1 March | 1898 | Triabunna, Tasmania | Australia | 6 | 0 | M | Committed suicide | |
| Baxter, James Reid, 43* | 8 April | 1908 | Invercargill | New Zealand | 6 | 0 | M | Committed suicide | |
| Archer, Andrew Thomas Edgar, 49* | 26 Feb | 1929 | Don, Tasmania | Australia | 6 | 0 | MA | Committed suicide | |
| Davies, Roderick Australia, 36* | 21 Aug | 1931 | Perth, Western Australia | Australia | 6 | 0 | F | Committed suicide | |
| Hall, Frederick Charles, 48* | 2 July | 1948 | Glen Innes, New South Wales | Australia | 6 | 0 | F | Sentenced to death | |
| Armanasco, Raymond, 40* | 12 Oct | 1950 | Perth, Western Australia | Australia | 6 | 0 | M | Sentenced to death | |
| Darnley, Joyce* | 5/6 May | 1964 | Sydney | Australia | 6 | 0 | P | Committed suicide | |
| Schlaepfer, Brian, 64* | 20 May | 1992 | Paerata | New Zealand | 6 | 0 | FM | Committed suicide | |
| Ram Chandar, 34* | 8 Jan | 1994 | Togomasi | Fiji | 6 | 0 | M | Sentenced to 120 years in prison | |
| May, Peter, 32* | 25 Jan | 1996 | Hillcrest, Queensland | Australia | 6 | 0 | F | | |
| Miles, Peter, 61* | 11 May | 2018 | Osmington, Western Australia | Australia | 6 | 0 | F | Committed suicide | |
| Wyrzykowski, Barbara, 25 | 3 July | 1999 | Perth, Western Australia | Australia | 5 | 0 | P | Committed suicide | |
| Patterson, Trudi, Erin, 48 | 29 July | 2023 | Leongatha, Victoria, Australia | Australia | 3 | 1 | P | Sentenced to life imprisonment | |

== Abbreviations and footnotes ==
* – Marks cases where all the victims were relatives of the perpetrator

W – A basic description of the weapons used in the murders

F – Firearms and other ranged weapons, especially rifles and handguns, but also bows and crossbows, grenade launchers, flamethrowers, or slingshots
M – Melee weapons, like knives, swords, spears, machetes, axes, clubs, rods, stones, or bare hands
O – Any other weapons, such as bombs, hand grenades, Molotov cocktails, poison and poisonous gas, as well as vehicle and arson attacks

A – indicates that an arson attack was the only other weapon used
V – indicates that a vehicle was the only other weapon used
E – indicates that explosives of any sort were the only other weapon used
P – indicates that an anaesthetising or deadly substance of any kind was the only other weapon used (includes poisonous gas)
