= List of Australian films of 2018 =

This is a list of Australian films scheduled for release in 2018.

== 2018 ==
Title	Director	Cast (subject of documentary)	Release date
The BBQ	Stephen Amis	Shane Jacobson, Magda Szubanski	22 February
Boar	Chris Sun	John Jarratt, Melissa Tkautz, Nathan Jones	18 October
Breath	Simon Baker	Simon Baker, Elizabeth Debicki, Ben Spence, Samson Coulter	4 May
Brothers' Nest	Clayton Jacobson	Shane Jacobson, Clayton Jacobson	11 March
Cargo	Ben Howling, Yolanda Ramke	Martin Freeman, Anthony Hayes, Caren Pistorius	
Celeste	Ben Hackworth	Radha Mitchell, Thomas Cocquerel, Nadine Garner, Odessa Young	3 August
The Film From Lot 15	Max Coultan	Keiran Whitehead, Jyoti Jakovickis and Ky Brutnell	2 February
Harmony	Corey Pearson	Jessica Falkholt, Jerome Meyer, Eamon Farren, Paula Arundell, Jacqueline McKenzie	9 October
Hotel Mumbai	Anthony Maras	Dev Patel, Armie Hammer, Nazanin Boniadi, Tilda Cobham-Hervey, Anupam Kher, Jason Isaacs, Suhail Nayyar, Vipin Sharma	7 September
Maya the Bee: The Honey Games	Noel Cleary, Sergio Delfino, Alexs Stadermann	Coco Jack Gillies, Benson Jack Anthony, Richard Roxburgh, Justine Clarke	26 July
The Merger	Mark Grentell	Damian Callinan, John Howard, Kate Mulvany	30 August
Nekrotronic	Kiah Roache-Turner	Monica Bellucci, David Wenham, Ben O'Toole	
Strange Colours	Alena Lodkina	Kate Cheel, Daniel P. Jones, Justin Courtin	27 April
Sweet Country	Warwick Thornton	Sam Neill, Bryan Brown, Matt Day	25 January
Swinging Safari	Stephan Elliott	Guy Pearce, Kylie Minogue, Radha Mitchell	18 January
That's Not My Dog!	Dean Murphy	Shane Jacobson, Paul Hogan, Jimeoin	15 March
Upgrade	Leigh Whannell	Logan Marshall-Green, Melanie Vallejo	14 June

== See also ==
- 2018 in Australia
- 2018 in Australian television
- List of 2018 box office number-one films in Australia
