= Serial crime =

Crime of a repetitive nature

Serial crimes are crimes of a repetitive nature. Serial murder, serial rape and serial arson are crimes regarded as serial crimes.

== Consistency of serial crime ==
=== Location selection ===
The potential crime locations usually contain the characteristics of the limited diversity and the narrow geographical range. Based on the analysis on the locations that the serial offenders adopt to encounter and release their victims, the consistency and the limited diversity involve in these locations across a series of crimes. To further expand upon the limited diversity and define the scope of the criminal sites, several researches provide some numerical data. One research clarifies the particular range of the homicide case locations selected by the offenders. This research concludes that the majority of the serial killers lives within 10 kilometers from the crime locations. Another study claims that the offenders often choose a place near to their accommodations as the crime sites (i.e., the median distance between the offender's home and the criminal spot is 3 kilometers).

=== Victim proclivity ===
"Marginalization" and "unfamiliarity" play a role in how serial killers select their target victims. The marginalized people refer to the individuals who are excluded by the modern institution based on the excuse of reprobation and censure. Vagrants, the homeless, prostitutes, migrant workers, and homosexuals become the major members of marginalized people. The unfamiliar people simply mean the group that the serial killers lack the previous interaction with. Based on the data collected from 97 victims and 21 serial killers, the strangers usually become their priority victim choice for the serial murderers.

=== Behavioral patterns ===
Instead of summarizing certain features shared among the killing behaviors of the serial murderers, researches indicate the consistent behavioral patterns from three dimensions. The serial homicide offenders express relatively consistent behaviors in aggressive actions during serial homicides. The scholars in the field of criminology and psychology often categorize the killing behaviors as aggressive actions, which expresses that every criminal conducts similar killing behavior patterns in his/her murdering series.

A higher possibility of consistency in the behavioral features for the serial killers occurs as their criminal case number increases. Scientifically, people will categorize a person as a serial killer through various metrics. One of the metrics claims that the high number of criminal cases becomes one of the core criteria to determine a person as the serial killer. Therefore, combined with this finding, the serial killers conducted consistent criminal behavior patterns based on their high crime case numbers.

The trace of the consistent criminal behavior pattern among the serial murderers appears in the connection between the serial killers and their victims. Researchers conduct an experiment to express that the offenses made by serial killers can behaviorally link to the same offenders. The capability to connect the crimes made by the criminals with the offenders exhibits that similar features exhibited through their offenses. These similar characteristics imply the outcome of the same criminal behaviors conducted by the same serial murderers, which indirectly implies the behavior consistency of the serial killers.

While some serial homicide cases appear an overall consistent pattern, some exceptional serial murdering cases do not follow the general consistent pattern. However, minor patterns still exist in the overall inconsistent criminal behaviors. Analyzing the development and details of the overall inconsistent killing behaviors, minor consistencies in three aspects of homicide behaviors (i.e., planning, wounding, or interaction with the victim). Therefore, people can always discover the consistency of criminal behaviors either by skimming through the overall behaviors of serial killers or zooming in on every individualized behavior of serial murderers.

== See also ==
- Recidivism
- List of murderers by number of victims
- List of serial killers by country
- Classification System for Serial Criminal Patterns
