= 2018 in Australian television =

This is a list of Australian television-related events, debuts, finales, and cancellations that were scheduled to occur in 2018, the 63rd year of continuous operation of television in Australia.

== Events ==
=== January ===
Date	Event	Source
1	The ABC's coverage of the annual midnight Sydney New Year's Eve fireworks is watched by 1.49 million viewers	
1	Gerard Whateley announced he is leaving the ABC after a 17-year career, including as host of Offsiders, moving to radio station 1116 SEN.	
7	SBS airs a three-hour commercial and commentary-free program The Ghan which follows The Ghan train from Adelaide to Darwin in the first locally produced slow television event series. It becomes the channel's highest rated broadcast in 12 months with 583,000 national viewers. Sister channel SBS Viceland runs a 17-hour extended version the following weekend lasting from 2:40am to 8:30pm.	
8	Following accusations around inappropriate conduct of actor Craig McLachlan in a stage show, the ABC removes all episodes of The Doctor Blake Mysteries, which McLachlan starred in, from its channels and ABC iview. Producers of the series December Media also announce they are temporarily suspending production of a future season for the Seven Network.	
17	Seven Network soap opera Home and Away marks 30 years since its debut on 17 January 1988. The program, which is the second longest-running Australian drama, begins its 31st season on 29 January.	
22	Georgie Gardner debuts as co-host of Today following the exit of Lisa Wilkinson in October 2017	
31	World Movies, an original launch channel on Foxtel in 1995, closes as a linear channel, continuing on only as an on demand offering and a branded segment on other movie channels.	

=== February ===
Date	Event	Source
9	The ABC holds its first Annual Public Meeting, which involves the ABC Board taking publicly submitted questions.	
9–25	The 2018 Winter Olympics in Pyeongchang, South Korea aired on the channels of the Seven Network	
11	The official 2018 OzTam television ratings period begins	
28	Eurosport News, FX Australia and Nat Geo People cease broadcasting on all Australian platforms	

=== March ===
Date	Event	Source
1	Discovery Channel and TLC become available on Fetch TV	
9	Bill McDonald is removed as co-anchor of Seven News Brisbane.	
12	Fiona O'Loughlin wins the fourth season of I'm a Celebrity...Get Me Out of Here!	
14–20	Seven News Melbourne presenter Peter Mitchell is slammed by the Supreme Court of Victoria for blatantly using inappropriate wording to describe the ongoing murder trial of Peter Dupas on the bulletin that aired on 14 March 2018.	
22	Claudia Anton wins the fourth season of The Great Australian Bake Off	
25	A two-week suspension in OzTam television ratings begins for the Easter break.	
25	Network Ten and its primary channel record their lowest ever weekly share for the 18–25 March 2018 week since OzTAM ratings began in 2001.	
29	The Nine Network secures the rights to televise the Australian Open tennis tournament from 2020–24. However, three months later, the deal is brought forward by twelve months.	

=== April ===
Date	Event	Source
2	"X Games Sydney" win the inaugural season of Australian Spartan	
4–15	The 2018 Commonwealth Games on the Gold Coast, Queensland will air on the channels of the Seven Network	
8	Official OzTam ratings resume after a two-week non-ratings period over Easter.	

=== May ===
Date	Event	Source
6	Alex and Emily win the ninth season of My Kitchen Rules	

=== June ===
Date	Event	Source
18	Sam Perry wins the seventh season of The Voice	
25	The Nine Network secures the rights to televise the Australian Open tennis tournament from 2019 onwards, twelve months earlier than planned.	
29	Better Homes and Gardens airs its 1,000th episode	

=== July ===
Date	Event	Source
1	The 60th Annual TV Week Logie Awards were held at The Star Gold Coast. As well as being staged in Queensland for the first time, the event introduced a number of changes including live re-voting, reducing the number of award categories, renaming of publicly voted categories and eligibility changes. The ceremony was held much later in the year than previous ceremonies to avoid clashing with the 2018 Commonwealth Games also being held on the Gold Coast.	
30	Toad and Mandy win the sixth season of House Rules	
31	Sashi Cheliah wins the tenth season of MasterChef Australia	

=== September ===
Date	Event	Source
24	The ABC Board sacks managing director Michelle Guthrie halfway through her five year contract.	
27	Chairman of the ABC Justin Milne resigns after claims emerge about political interference at the ABC and the surprise sacking of Michelle Guthrie days earlier.	

=== October ===
Date	Event	Source
4	For the first time in the Australian version of The Bachelor, Nick Cummins fails to choose a winner in the finale of the sixth season.	
9	Shane Gould wins Australian Survivor: Champions vs. Contenders, the fifth season of Australian Survivor	
11	Major glitches ruins what was to be Ian Henderson's final ABC News Victoria bulletin, with the New South Wales bulletin instead broadcast. He eventually presents his final bulletin the following evening, with Tamara Oudyn named as his replacement.	
28	Hayden and Sara win the fourteenth season of The Block	
31	Network Ten launches a major network branding, including introducing a new logo for the first time since 1991. Channel Ten becomes Channel 10, while multichannels ONE and ELEVEN are rebranded as 10 Boss (later renamed to 10 Bold) and 10 Peach respectively.	

=== November ===
Date	Event	Source
2	Sky News Live sacks Ross Cameron after making racist comments as co-host of Outsiders, becoming the second original co-host to be fired due to controversial comments made on the program after Mark Latham in 2017.	
15	Ali Oetjen chooses Taite Radley in the finale of season four of The Bachelorette.	
25	Lai Utovou wins the inaugural season of All Together Now.	

=== December ===
Date	Event	Source
1	The last day of the official 2018 OzTam television ratings period.	
18	Weekend Today Co-Host Peter Stefanovic announces he's leaving the Nine Network after 15 Years.	

== Television channels ==
=== New channels ===
- 2 September – Sky News on WIN
- 1 October – Your Money
- 1 December - 7food network

=== Renamed channels ===
- 31 October - Eleven to 10 Peach, One to 10 Boss
- 17 November - Food Network to SBS Food
- 10 December - 10 Boss to 10 Bold

=== Channel closures ===
- 31 January – World Movies
- 28 February – Eurosport News, FX, Nat Geo People

== Premieres ==
Television programs which debut for the first time on Australian television.

=== Domestic series ===
List of domestic television series premieres
Program	Original airdate	Channel	Source
Romper Stomper	1 January 2018	Stan	
Hughesy, We Have a Problem	30 January 2018	Network Ten	
Grace Beside Me	16 February 2018	NITV	
Australian Spartan	25 February 2018	Seven Network	
Bachelor in Paradise Australia	25 March 2018	Network Ten	
Picnic at Hanging Rock	6 May 2018	showcase	
Love Island Australia	27 May 2018	9Go!	
Bite Club	15 August 2018	Nine Network	
Bluey	1 October 2018	ABC Kids	
Paramedics	4 October 2018	Nine Network	

=== International series ===
List of international television series premieres
Program	Original airdate	Channel	Country of origin	Source
S.W.A.T.	14 January 2018	FOX8	United States	
SEAL Team	28 January 2018	Network Ten	United States	
Hard Sun	7 February 2018	Seven Network	United Kingdom	
Celebrity Big Brother	11 February 2018	9Go!	United States	
Blue Planet II	17 February 2018	Nine Network	United Kingdom	
Corporate	22 February 2018	The Comedy Channel	United States	
The Resident	26 February 2018	Seven Network	United States	
Wellington Paranormal	31 July 2018	SBS Viceland	New Zealand	

== Programming changes ==
=== Changes to channel affiliation ===
Criterion for inclusion in the following list is that Australian premiere episodes will air in Australia for the first time on a new channel. This includes when a program is moved from a free-to-air channel's primary channel to a digital multi-channel, as well as when a program moves between subscription television channels – provided the preceding criterion is met. Ended television series which change networks for repeat broadcasts are not included in the list.

List of domestic television series which changed channel affiliation
Program	Date	New channel	Previous channel	Source

List of international television programs which changed channel affiliation
Program	Date	New channel	Previous channel	Country of origin	Source
The Simpsons	28 February 2018	7mate	Eleven	United States	

=== Free-to-air premieres ===
This is a list of programs which made their premiere on Australian free-to-air television that had previously premiered on Australian subscription television. Programs may still air on the original subscription television network.

List of international television programs which premiered on free-to-air television for the first time
Program	Date	Free-to-air channel	Subscription channel	Country of origin	Source

=== Subscription premieres ===
This is a list of programs which made their debut on Australian subscription television, having previously premiered on Australian free-to-air television. Programs may still air (first or repeat) on the original free-to-air television channel.

List of domestic television programs which premiered on subscription television for the first time
Program	Date	Free-to-air channel	Subscription network(s)	Source

=== Returning programs ===
Australian produced programs which are returning with a new season after being absent from television in the previous calendar year.

List of returning domestic television series
Program	Return date	Channel	Original run	Source
Talkin' 'Bout Your Generation	21 May 2018	Nine Network	2009-2012 (Ten)	
Sports Tonight	15 July 2018	Network Ten	1993-2011	
All Aussie Adventures	5 August 2018	Network Ten	2001-2004	
Blind Date	15 October 2018	Network Ten	1991	

=== Endings ===
List of domestic television series endings
Program	End date	Network	Start date	Source
Blind Date	19 December	Network 10	15 October	
The Checkout	17 April	ABC	21 March 2013	
Game of Games	15 December	Network 10	7 October	
ScreenPLAY	27 April	7mate	29 June 2017	
Shark Tank	7 August	Network Ten	8 February 2015	

== Deaths ==
Date	Name	Age	Broadcast credibility	References
16 January	Moya O'Sullivan	aged 91	Actress known for Number 96 as Pyillis Pratt and Neighbours as Marlene Kratz	
17 January	Jessica Falkholt	aged 29	Actress in the television series Home and Away as Hope Morrison.	
4 May	Cathy Godbold	aged 33	Actress best known as role in Home and Away as Meg Bowman	
28 May	Cornelia Frances (OAM)	aged 77	Actress starred in The Young Doctors, Sons and Daughters, Home and Away and hosted The Weakest Link	
9 July	Sam Chisholm (AO)	aged 78	New Zealand born Australian media executive, known for the Nine Network	
1 December	Judy McBurney	aged 70	Actress best known for her roles in The Young Doctors as Tania Livingstone and in cult series Prisoneras Sandra "Pixie" Mason.	
26 December	Penny Cook	aged 61	Australian actress best known for the serial A Country Practice as Vicki Dean Bowen, E Street as Dr. Elly Fielding, and Neighbours as Prue Brown and presenter of The Great Outdoors	

== See also ==
- 2018 in Australia
- List of Australian films of 2018
