= List of murderers by number of victims =

- For serial killers see: List of serial killers by number of victims
- For mass murderers and spree killers see: List of rampage killers

== See also ==
- Lists of murderers
