= Lists of murderers =

Lists of murderers include lists of rampage killers who kill two or more victims in a short time, including mass murderers and spree killers, and lists of serial killers, who murder three or more people over more than a month, with a significant period of time between the murders. (Note: Definitions vary, but typically a person who kills multiple people in a short time in one place is called a mass murderer, while a person who kills multiple people in a short time in multiple locations without any cooling off period is called a spree killer. A serial killer is one who kills multiple people over an extended period of time with cooling off periods between the killings.)

== Rampage killers ==
- List of rampage killers

=== By place ===
- List of rampage killers (home intruders)
- List of rampage killers (home intruders in the United States)
- List of rampage killers (school massacres)
- List of rampage killers (workplace killings)
- List of rampage killers (workplace violence in the military)
- List of rampage killers (vehicular homicide)

=== By region ===
- List of rampage killers in Africa
- List of rampage killers in the Americas
- List of rampage killers in Asia
- List of rampage killers in Europe
- List of rampage killers in Oceania and Maritime Southeast Asia

=== Familicides by region ===
- List of rampage killers (familicides in Africa)
- List of rampage killers (familicides in Americas)
- List of rampage killers (familicides in Asia)
- List of rampage killers (familicides in Oceania and Maritime Southeast Asia)
- List of rampage killers (familicides in Europe)
- List of rampage killers (familicides in China)

=== Other ===
- List of rampage killers (religious, political, or ethnic crimes)

== Serial killers ==
- List of serial killers before 1900
- List of serial killers by number of victims
- List of serial killers by country
- List of German serial killers
- List of Russian serial killers
- List of serial killers in the United States

== Other ==
- List of murder convictions without a body
- List of youngest killers

== See also ==
- Lists of murders
