= Hillcrest shooting =

Familicide in Hillcrest, Queensland, Australia

- Location: Hillcrest, Queensland, Australia
- Date: 25 January 1996 c. 3:50 am (AEST)
- Target: Family members
- Attack type: Mass shooting, murder–suicide, familicide
- Weapon: .30-30 Winchester 1894
- Deaths: 7 (including the perpetrator)
- Perpetrator: Peter May

On 25 January 1996, 32-year-old Peter May shot and killed six people in the suburb of Hillcrest in Logan City, Queensland, Australia. May, a man who was described as a problematic gambler with a history of domestic violence, killed his estranged wife, Helen, his three children and his parents-in-law before he committed suicide.

It remains both one of Australia's most high-profile cases of domestic violence and one of Australia's worst mass shootings, occurring just three months before the Port Arthur massacre.

== Background ==
A month prior, Peter May had visited a Men's Rights Agency (MRA) and was reportedly told he had little hope of seeing his children after his wife left him. It was alleged the MRA may have encouraged him to use a private investigator to track down his wife's secret address, though the agency denied their advice led to the tragedy.

== Shooting ==
All three of his children, Lisa, 11, Andrew, 9, and Natalie, 7, were all shot dead at an Ellen Grove address in Brisbane’s southwest.

Peter then drove to Hillcrest where his wife was staying with her parents Jim and Rita Potter. He then killed the Potters, dragging Helen back inside as she tried to escape and shooting her dead, before taking his own life.

== See also ==
- Osmington shooting, a familicide with a similar death toll that occurred in Osmington, Western Australia on 11 May 2018
