= 2019 Melbourne nightclub shooting =

Drive-by shooting in Melbourne, Australia

2019 Melbourne Nightclub Shooting
- Map of the location which the shooting occurred.
- Location: Prahran, Victoria
- Date: 14 April 2019
- Attack type: Drive-by-shooting
- Weapon: Firearm
- Deaths: 2
- Injuries: 4

On 14 April 2019, alleged perpetrators Jacob Elliott and Allan Fares committed a drive-by-shooting, using a stolen black Porsche Cayenne, targeting the Love Machine nightclub in Melbourne, Victoria. This attack, which is believed to not have a specific target other than the nightclub itself, led to the deaths of Richard Arrow and Aaron Khalid Osmani. Following the shooting, Victoria Police additionally arrested Moussa Hamka, whom is being charged with numerous offences including accessory to murder, possessing a firearm, stalking and other additional charges in relation to the incident. The three accused perpetrators have pleaded not guilty to all charges.

== Motive ==
On 15 April 2019 Victorian Police made a statement mentioning their intention to investigate the connection between the shooting and Outlaw Biker Gangs. This claim was additionally supported by further investigation, with the two suspects Jacob Elliot and Allan Fares to have known connections with an outlaw motorcycle gang. The motive of the attack is greatly accredited towards revenge due to a dispute with one of the accused family members being ejected out of the club at a previous date. There have been previous reports of attempts from Biker Gangs to enforce "protection payments" upon the Love Machine nightclub in Prahran, Victoria.

== Aftermath ==
Shortly following the shooting, 26-year-old Moussa Hamka was alleged to have hidden the 32-calibre firearm used in the attack in his bedroom. Following the arrest, his bail was revoked by the Victorian Supreme Court. Hamka's lawyers did not attempt to oppose the decision.

On 1 July 2019, homicide detectives issued a search warrant for a home in Bundoora, Victoria. At the premises, 18-year-old Jacob Elliott was arrested and charged with two counts of murder and three counts of attempted murder. Elliott was the second person to be charged in relation to the incident.

Allan Fares was arrested in the early morning of 3 July 2019. He was charged with two counts of murder and three counts of attempted murder. As of that time, Fares remained in police custody pending further legal proceedings.

== See also ==
- List of mass shootings in Australia
