= Joe Malone (footballer) =

Australian rules footballer (1924–2018)

Personal information
- Full name: Joseph Vincent Malone
- Born: 4 February 1924; Laanecoorie, Victoria
- Died: 24 March 2018 (aged 94)
- Original team: Laanecoorie
- Height: 170 cm (5 ft 7 in)
- Weight: 77 kg (170 lb)

Playing career^{1}
| Years | Club | Games (Goals) |
| 1946–47 | North Melbourne | 10 (2) |
- ^{1} Playing statistics correct to the end of 1947.

Joseph Vincent Malone (4 February 1924 – 24 March 2018) was an Australian rules footballer who played with North Melbourne in the Victorian Football League (VFL).

Prior to playing for North Melbourne, Malone enlisted in the Australian Army and served in New Guinea during World War II.
