= List of 2018 box office number-one films in Australia =

This is a list of films which have placed number one at the box office in Australia during 2018. All amounts are in Australian dollars and from Box Office Mojo.

#	Weekend end date	Film	Weekend gross	Top 20 openings
1	7 January 2018	Jumanji: Welcome to the Jungle	$6,409,669	Pitch Perfect 3 (#2), All the Money in the World (#5), Three Billboards Outside Ebbing, Missouri (#7)
2	14 January 2018	Jumanji: Welcome to the Jungle	$4,729,836	The Post (#4), Darkest Hour (#6), The Nut Job 2: Nutty by Nature (#12), Along with the Gods: The Two Worlds (#14), Thaanaa Serndha Koottam (#17)
3	21 January 2018	Maze Runner: The Death Cure	$3,400,221	The Commuter (#6), The Shape of Water (#14), The Swinging Safari (#15), Mary and the Witch's Flower (#18)
4	28 January 2018	I, Tonya	$2,318,027	Padmaavat (#5), Sweet Country (#18)
5	4 February 2018	The Greatest Showman	$1,600,311	Den of Thieves (#3), Molly's Game (#5), Phantom Thread (#14), Paw Patrol: Sea Patrol (#16)
6	11 February 2018	Fifty Shades Freed	$4,661,242	Insidious: The Last Key (#4), The 15:17 to Paris (#10), Pad Man (#16)
7	18 February 2018	Black Panther	$10,525,885	Lady Bird (#3), Detective Chinatown 2 (#14), Monster Hunt 2 (#15), Laavaan Phere (#18)
8	25 February 2018	Black Panther	$7,510,380	Game Night (#2), Finding Your Feet (#4), Winchester (#8), Operation Red Sea (#10), The BBQ (#11), Hibiscus & Ruthless (#17)
9	4 March 2018	Black Panther	$4,530,116	Red Sparrow (#2)
10	11 March 2018	Black Panther	$3,203,131	12 Strong (#4), Happy Family (#10), Death Wish (#11), Laung Laachi (#13), The Mercy (#18)
11	18 March 2018	Tomb Raider	$2,787,480	Peter Rabbit (#5), I Can Only Imagine (#11), That's Not My Dog! (#14), Raid (#15)
12	25 March 2018	Peter Rabbit	$3,642,554	Pacific Rim Uprising (#2), Sajjan Singh Rangroot (#8), Mary Magdalene (#12)
13	1 April 2018	Ready Player One	$3,933,527	Blockers (#3), Love, Simon (#4), A Wrinkle in Time (#6), The Death of Stalin (#9), Rangasthalam (#11), Baaghi 2 (#12), Paul, Apostle of Christ (#13), The Other Side of Hope (#19)
14	8 April 2018	Peter Rabbit	$2,902,240	A Quiet Place (#3), Sherlock Gnomes (#5), Early Man (#13), Subedar Joginder Singh (#16)
15	15 April 2018	Rampage	$3,038,135	Truth or Dare (#6), Isle of Dogs (#8), The Party (#14), Golak Bugni Bank Te Batua (#16), Distant Sky - Nick Cave & The Bad Seeds Live in Copenhagen (#18)
16	22 April 2018	I Feel Pretty	$2,494,898	The Guernsey Literary and Potato Peel Pie Society (#5), Super Troopers 2 (#11), Bharat Ane Nenu (#12)
17	29 April 2018	Avengers: Infinity War	$21,239,894	Nelyubov (Loveless) (#16), Gurrmul (#18), Unsane (#19)
18	6 May 2018	Avengers: Infinity War	$10,209,214	Breath (#3), Daana Paani (#10), A or B (#11), 102 Not Out (#12), Naa Peru Surya (#13)
19	13 May 2018	Avengers: Infinity War	$5,312,136	Life of the Party (#2), Tully (#7), Crooked House (#8), Midnight Oil 1984 (#10), Raazi (#12)
20	20 May 2018	Deadpool 2	$12,619,836	How Long Will I Love You (#9), Aurore (#12), Harjeeta (#17), The Royal Wedding of HRH Prince Harry & Miss Meghan Markle (#20)
21	27 May 2018	Solo: A Star Wars Story	$6,612,874	Duck Duck Goose (#8), Parmanu: The Story of Pokhran (#16)
22	3 June 2018	Deadpool 2	$3,569,345	Veere Di Wedding (#6), Carry On Jatta 2 (#7), Gringo (#8)
23	10 June 2018	Ocean's 8	$5,550,644	Hereditary (#4), Kaala (#6), Kodachrome (#20)
24	17 June 2018	Incredibles 2	$10,615,273	Tag (#3), Race 3 (#7), Upgrade (#8), The Leisure Seeker (#10), Disobedience (#13)
25	24 June 2018	Jurassic World: Fallen Kingdom	$10,272,557	Brother's Nest (#15), Ideal Home (#18), Foxtrot (#20)
26	1 July 2018	Jurassic World: Fallen Kingdom	$6,124,201	Hotel Transylvania 3: Summer Vacation (#3), Sicario: Day of the Soldado (#4), Sanju (#6), Adrift (#7), Demain tout commence (#14), Animal World (#17)
27	8 July 2018	Ant-Man and the Wasp	$5,814,528	Show Dogs (#9), Mary Shelley (#17)
28	15 July 2018	Ant-Man and the Wasp	$3,782,206	Skyscraper (#4), Soorma (#12), Muse: Drones World Tour (#13), Vadhayiyaan Ji Vadhayiyaan (#14), Overboard (#19)
29	22 July 2018	Mamma Mia: Here We Go Again!	$5,906,745	The Equalizer 2 (#2), Dhadak (#11), Kadai Kutty Singam (#18)
30	29 July 2018	Mamma Mia: Here We Go Again!	$3,903,564	Andre Rieu's 2018 Maastricht Concert: Amore, My Tribute To Love (#3), The Breaker Upperers (#5), Ashke (#10), Detective Dee: The Four Heavenly Kings (#11), Beirut (#12), Maya the Bee: The Honey Games (#14), Whitney (#15)
31	5 August 2018	Mission: Impossible – Fallout	$6,214,801	The Wife (#5), Along with the Gods: The Last 49 Days (#11), Summer 1993 (#13), Thomas & Friends: Big World! Big Adventures! The Movie (#17), Fanney Khan (#19)
32	12 August 2018	Mission: Impossible – Fallout	$3,637,508	The Spy Who Dumped Me (#3), The Island (#8), On Chesil Beach (#13), Vishwaroopam II (#15), Dakuaan Da Munda (#16), Superfly (#17)
33	19 August 2018	The Meg	$3,404,528	BlacKkKlansman (#3), The Darkest Minds (#6), Grease (40th Anniversary) (#10), Geetha Govindam (#14)
34	26 August 2018	The Meg	$2,114,076	Book Club (#3), Slender Man (#5), The Happytime Murders (#7), Working Class Boy (#9), Mirai (#18)
35	2 September 2018	Crazy Rich Asians	$5,218,601	Mile 22 (#3), Luis & the Aliens (#10), Mar Gaye Oye Loko (#13), Kin (#14), The Insult (#16), Stree (#20)
36	9 September 2018	Crazy Rich Asians	$4,087,157	The Nun (#2), The Merger (#14), McQueen (#17), Big Brother (#19)
37	16 September 2018	Crazy Rich Asians	$2,427,727	The Predator (#2), A Simple Favor (#3), Christopher Robin (#5), Teen Titans Go! To the Movies (#6), Searching (#8), The Hows of Us (#13), Seema Raja (#17), Manmarziyaan (#18), Sailaja Reddy Alludu (#20)
38	23 September 2018	Johnny English Strikes Again	$2,699,042	Ladies in Black (#2), Smallfoot (#6), The House with a Clock in Its Walls (#9), Qismat (#13), Golden Job (#17), Saamy Square (#18), Batti Gul Meter Chalu (#19), Mandy (#20)
39	30 September 2018	Johnny English Strikes Again	$2,396,942	Night School (#3), Alpha (#12), Chekka Chivantha Vaanam (#13), My Hero Academia: Two Heroes (#14), Sui Dhaaga (#15), Devadas (#16), Parahuna (#17)
40	7 October 2018	Venom	$9,336,140	Paw Patrol Mighty Pups: The Movie (#10), Project Gutenberg (#13), The Seagull (#16), American Animals (#17), Afsar (#18), 96 (#19), Andhadhun (#20)
41	14 October 2018	Venom	$4,126,019	First Man (#2), Bad Times at the El Royale (#4), Aravinda Sametha Veera Raghava (#13), Shadow (#16), Exes Baggage (#17)
42	21 October 2018	A Star Is Born	$6,019,203	Badhaai Ho (#8), Vada Chennai (#15), One Percent (#17), Aate Di Chidi (#19), I Want to Eat Your Pancreas (#20)
43	28 October 2018	A Star Is Born	$5,004,675	Halloween (#2), Goosebumps 2: Haunted Halloween (#3), Beautiful Boy (#11), Twilight (10th Anniversary) (#18), Klimt & Schiele: Eros and Psyche (#19), Baazaar (#20)
44	4 November 2018	Bohemian Rhapsody	$6,760,103	Hunter Killer (#5), Charming (#9), Indivisible (#17), Colette (#19), Savyasachi (#20)
45	11 November 2018	Bohemian Rhapsody	$6,202,906	The Girl in the Spider's Web (#3), Thugs of Hindostan (#5), Boy Erased (#7), They Shall Not Grow Old (#10), Patrick (#12), Suspiria (#16), Intimate Strangers (#17), Journey's End (#19)
46	18 November 2018	Fantastic Beasts: The Crimes of Grindelwald	$8,574,160	Burn the Stage: The Movie (#4), The Old Man & the Gun (#6), Shoplifters (#16), Taxiwaala (#17)
47	25 November 2018	Fantastic Beasts: The Crimes of Grindelwald	$4,244,437	Robin Hood (#3), Widows (#5), The Nutcracker and the Four Realms (#6), The Children Act (#7), A Cool Fish (#10), Pokémon the Movie: Story of Everyone (#17)
48	2 December 2018	Creed II	$2,985,026	The Grinch (#2), 2.0 (#5), Louis Theroux's Altered States (#11), Normandie nue (#13), Sorry to Bother You (#17), Lean on Pete (#20)
49	9 December 2018	The Grinch	$2,467,752	Mortal Engines (#4), Second Act (#6), Overlord (#8), Can You Ever Forgive Me? (#13), Elliot the Littlest Reindeer (#14), Kedarnath (#15), Banjara: The Truck Driver (#17)
50	16 December 2018	The Grinch	$2,695,822	Spider-Man: Into The Spider-Verse (#2), Andre Rieu's Sydney Town Hall Concert: An Australian Celebration (#5), Once Upon a Deadpool (#10), Peppermint (#11), Free Solo (#17), Bhajjo Veero Ve (#18)
51	23 December 2018	Bumblebee	$2,957,184	Zero (#8), Zimna Wojna (Cold War) (#18), Master Z: The Ip Man Legacy (#19)
52	30 December 2018	Aquaman	$11,266,897	Ralph Breaks the Internet (#2), Holmes & Watson (#5), Vice (#7), The Favourite (#8), Simmba (#10)

== Highest-grossing films ==
Highest-grossing films of 2018
Rank	Title	Distributor	Domestic gross
1	Avengers: Infinity War	Disney	$40,228,902
2	Incredibles 2	Disney	$33,834,134
3	Black Panther	Disney	$31,030,616
4	Bohemian Rhapsody	Fox	$28,863,114
5	Jurassic World: Fallen Kingdom	Universal	$25,745,851
6	Jumanji: Welcome to the Jungle	Sony	$25,540,482
7	Deadpool 2	Fox	$24,694,655
8	A Star Is Born	Warner Bros.	$22,680,869
9	The Greatest Showman	Fox	$21,351,102
10	Peter Rabbit	Sony	$20,379,297

== See also ==
- List of Australian films – Australian films by year
- 2018 in film
