= Geoff Jones (footballer, born 1930) =

Australian rules footballer (1930–2018)

Personal information
- Full name: Geoffrey Jones
- Born: 5 April 1930
- Died: 15 February 2018 (aged 87)
- Original team: Sandringham
- Height: 175 cm (5 ft 9 in)
- Weight: 73 kg (161 lb)
- Position: Rover

Playing career^{1}
Years	Club	Games (Goals)
1954–1956	St Kilda	19 (12)
- ^{1} Playing statistics correct to the end of 1956.

Geoff Jones (5 April 1930 – 15 February 2018) was an Australian rules footballer who played for the St Kilda Football Club in the Victorian Football League (VFL).
