= Nev Pask =

Australian property developer (died 2018)

Neville John Pask (born in Gympie, Australia, died 25 February 2018) was an Australian businessman and one of Queensland's biggest property developers, having built 1500 homes and many other projects.

He was described as a land baron, with holdings estimated to be worth A$640 million in 2007, with a land bank of sufficient size to allow the eventual construction of 9000 homes. He was the fifth wealthiest Queenslander, with a net worth in 2008 of A$875 million according to the Business Review Weekly Rich List.

His philanthropic causes included the Police Citizens Youth Club, Zoe Reed Hospice, Royal Children's Hospital and the Brisbane Lord Mayor's Community Trust. In 2003, he was awarded the Centenary Medal for distinguished service to business and commerce through the construction industry.

He was considered a shrewd investor in property; in 2001 he paid $24 million for land in the Melbourne outer suburb of Rowville and eventually made a $50 million gross profit on that development alone. In 2004, Pask was accused by a farmer who had sold him farm land of exploiting "inside knowledge that the area would be rezoned for urban use". Pask defended the deal, pointing out that the farmer had legal advice at the time of the deal.
