= Jim Kettle =

Australian rules footballer (1925–2018)

Personal information
- Full name: James Cameron Kettle
- Born: 4 July 1925; Brunswick, Victoria
- Died: 16 September 2018 (aged 93)
- Height: 185 cm (6 ft 1 in)
- Weight: 83 kg (183 lb)
- Position: Wing

Playing career^{1}
Years	Club	Games (Goals)
1945, 1947–52	Fitzroy	41 (23)
- ^{1} Playing statistics correct to the end of 1952.

James Cameron Kettle (4 July 1925 – 16 September 2018) was an Australian rules footballer who played with Fitzroy in the Victorian Football League (VFL).
