= Max Cole (footballer) =

Australian rules footballer

Personal information
- Full name: Max Cole
- Born: 30 January 1941
- Died: 25 February 2018 (aged 77)
- Original team: Noble Park / Dandenong
- Height: 175 cm (5 ft 9 in)
- Weight: 83 kg (183 lb)
- Position: Back pocket

Playing career^{1}
Years	Club	Games (Goals)
1965–69	Fitzroy	52 (0)
- ^{1} Playing statistics correct to the end of 1969.

Max Cole (30 January 1941 – 25 February 2018) was an Australian rules footballer who played with Fitzroy in the Victorian Football League (VFL).
