= Frank Drum =

Australian rules footballer (1931–2018)

Personal information
- Full name: Francis William Drum
- Born: 3 January 1931; Minyip, Victoria
- Died: 5 October 2018 (aged 87); Minyip, Victoria
- Original team: Minyip
- Height: 191 cm (6 ft 3 in)
- Weight: 89 kg (196 lb)

Playing career^{1}
Years	Club	Games (Goals)
1950	Richmond	2 (0)
- ^{1} Playing statistics correct to the end of 1950.

Career highlights
- 1952 Wimmera Football League premiership; 1954 Wimmera Football League premiership

Francis William Drum (3 January 1931 – 5 October 2018) was an Australian rules footballer who played with Richmond in the Victorian Football League (VFL).
