= Ronald Crawford (race walker) =

Australian racewalker (1936–2018)

Ronald John Crawford OAM (26 March 1936 – 8 August 2018) was an Australian racewalker who competed in the 1956 Summer Olympics, in the 1960 Summer Olympics, and in the 1964 Summer Olympics.
