= 2026 Logan pub shooting =

Mass shooting in Australia 2026

- Location: Loganholme, Logan City, Queensland, Australia
- Date: 24 October 2026; 8:15 pm (AEST)
- Attack type: Mass shooting
- Deaths: 1
- Injuries: 3
- Victim: Vana-Reese Schuster-Togiatau

On 24 October 2026, a mass shooting occurred in a Loganholme, a suburb of Logan City in Queensland. One person died, three others were injured.

== Attack ==
At 8:15am, police were called to Fitzy's Loganholme, a pub located on Bryants Road, following reports of gunshots fired from a vehicle. A Mitsubishi approached the drop-off zone where people were gathered during the intermission of a boxing tournament. Witnesses saw two people wearing balaclavas and gloves. A number of shots were fired from the front passenger window of the vehicle, injuring four people, before leaving the scene. Police allege the vehicle was set alight on Maloney Road, Waterford West, which has since been declared a crime scene, and a second car collected the occupants of the vehicle and departed. CCTV footage appears to show one of the occupants injuring themselves when setting the car alight.

A second car was identified later that evening, a dual-cab ute was found set alight on Beenleigh Beaudesert Road at Tamborine but has yet to be conclusively linked to the attack.

== Victims ==
Four people received bullet wounds and were transported to hospital including;

- 19-year-old Jimboomba woman, shot in the head and neck and died later in hospital
- 38-year-old Browns Plains man, shot in the abdomen and arm
- 37-year-old Salisbury man, shot in the abdomen
- 27-year-old Cornubia man, shot in the abdomen

It is believed that the attack was targeted, and the 19-year-old was an unintended victim.
