= Sam Chisholm =

New Zealand-Australian media executive

Sam Chisholm (AO)
- Born: Samuel Hewlings Chisholm; 8 October 1939; New Zealand
- Died: 9 July 2018 (aged 78)
- Education: King's College, Auckland
- Occupation: Media Executive
- Known for: Association with Nine Network

Samuel Hewlings Chisholm AO (8 October 1939 – 9 July 2018) was a New Zealand-born Australian media executive who was a significant figure in the Australian media.

== Career ==
Chisholm attended King's College, Auckland.

Chisholm had been for several years the sales director of Kerry Packer's Channel Nine before he was appointed managing director in 1975. During this time the Network enjoyed a period of unprecedented ratings and revenue success to become Australia’s No 1 television network. In 1988 Kerry Packer sold the network to Alan Bond. In 1990 Chisholm moved to the UK to work for Packer's rival Rupert Murdoch, rescuing the newly established British Sky Broadcasting BSkyB from financial problems after the merger of Sky and British Satellite Broadcasting. In 2000, he returned to Australia, and in 2003 received a double lung transplant.

== Awards ==
On 25 November 2013 he was appointed an honorary officer of the Order of Australia. On 19 February 2014 he was awarded the King's College honours tie in Auckland, New Zealand for outstanding achievement in his selected career.

== Benefactor ==
When leading Australian television personality Graham Kennedy became ill in his later years, an anonymous benefactor came forward and donated a substantial sum (reported to be A$150,000) for Kennedy's ongoing support and health care. On 27 May 2005, two days after Kennedy's death, his close friend and carer Noeline Brown confirmed that the benefactor was Sam Chisholm.

== Death ==
Chisholm died on 9 July 2018, after a short illness, with his wife Sue and daughter Caroline by his side.
