= Osmington shooting =

Familicide in Osmington, Western Australia, Australia

- Location: 33.906°S 115.229°E; Osmington, Western Australia, Australia
- Date: 11 May 2018 c. 4:00 am – 5:00 am (WST)
- Target: Members of the Miles-Cockman family
- Attack type: Mass shooting, murder–suicide, familicide
- Weapon: Three rifles
- Deaths: 7 (including the perpetrator)
- Perpetrator: Peter Miles

The Osmington shooting was a familicide in Osmington, Western Australia, on 11 May 2018, in which Peter Miles, a 61-year-old retired high school farm manager, shot dead his wife, daughter, and four grandchildren, before calling police and then committing suicide. It was the worst mass shooting in Australia since the 1996 Port Arthur massacre, until the 2025 Bondi Beach shooting.

== Background ==
Peter Miles worked in the farm school at Margaret River Senior High School for twenty years. In 2015, he and his wife Cynda moved from the Margaret River townsite to a 12-hectare (30-acre) hobby farm in Osmington. Miles' daughter, Katrina, and her four children (Tay, 13; Rylan, 12; Arye, 10 and Kayden, 8) moved onto the property following the breakdown of her marriage, living in a renovated shed. Katrina believed the children were on the autism spectrum, and they were withdrawn from the local school in order to be home-schooled.

According to Aaron Cockman, Katrina's estranged husband and father to the four children, the Miles family had a history of violence, mental illness and dysfunctional relationships. Peter was "estranged from his own mother and his father had tried to kill him". His son, Katrina's brother, burned down a shed during a family dispute and later committed suicide. Katrina had also "once threatened to kill herself and the children by driving into a tree". Cockman stated that Peter paid an estimated $100,000 of his daughter's legal fees relating to their separation, and that Peter and Cynda had prevented him from seeing his children for six months prior to the shootings.

== Investigation ==
Authorities arrived at the Miles' 30-acre farm in Osmington following a call to 000 at 5:15 am. Peter (aged 61) was found outside the property deceased in a chair on the veranda, his wife Cynda (58) inside the main house. The bodies of their daughter, Katrina Cockman (35), and her four children were found inside the converted shed that served as their residence. Western Australia Police Commissioner Chris Dawson confirmed that three rifles were recovered at the property, all of which were licensed to Peter, and that police did not believe that anyone outside the residence was involved.

Aaron Cockman held a press conference forty-eight hours after learning of the deaths, stating that he had been told by police that Peter first shot Katrina and her four children while they slept in their beds, before shooting his wife Cynda in the living room of their home. He then placed a two-minute 000 call to police alerting them to the shootings, before committing suicide.

On 17 May, Dawson confirmed that police had completed forensic work and that access to the property was returned to the family, but stated that the investigation would continue for several months. A suicide note was also confirmed to have been found. Peter was also found to be on selective serotonin reuptake inhibitor class antidepressants at the time of the incident.

== Aftermath and criticism ==
Cockman has criticised the Office of the State Coroner for its secrecy and unwillingness to provide information to him. Ros Fogliani, the State Coroner, rejected his request for a public inquest to be held, stating that it was "not desirable" and that "all relevant lines of inquiry have been followed and that a coroner is now able to make the required findings about the deaths on the evidence that has already been obtained". Cockman subsequently wrote to state attorney-general John Quigley reiterating his request for a public inquest.

Cockman has stated his belief that the Family Court of Western Australia placed the Miles family "under intense financial and emotional pressure" prior to the killings, and supports a royal commission into Australian family law.

== See also ==
- List of mass shootings in Australia
- Timeline of major crimes in Australia
