= Osmington, Western Australia =

Osmington
- Town
- Coordinates: 33°54′16″S 115°12′51″E
- Country: Australia
- State: Western Australia
- LGA(s): Shire of Augusta-Margaret River
- Location: 20 km (12 mi) north-east of Margaret River

Government
  - State electorate(s): Vasse
  - Federal division(s): Forrest

Area
  - Total: 34.5 km^{2} (13.3 sq mi)

Population
  - Total(s): 163 (SAL 2021)
- Postcode: 6285

Osmington is a small townsite located in the South West region of Western Australia in the Shire of Augusta-Margaret River, about 20 km (12 mi) north-east of Margaret River.

It was established as part of the Group Settlement Scheme, being group number 85. The only building standing in the townsite proper is St John's Anglican church that was established in 1933 and is listed by the Heritage Council of Western Australia; the town also used to have a primary school. It mostly consists of rural vineyards and farmland properties. It gained notoriety due to a multiple shooting murder-suicide in the locality on 11 May 2018.
