= 1997 in Australia =

- Monarch: Elizabeth II
- Governor-General: Sir William Deane
- Prime minister: John Howard
- Population: 18,517,564
- Elections: NT, SA

The following lists events that happened during 1997 in Australia.

- Decades: 1970s; 1980s; 1990s; 2000s; 2010s
- See also: 1997 in Australian television; 1997 in Australian literature; Other events of 1997; Timeline of Australian history

== Incumbents ==
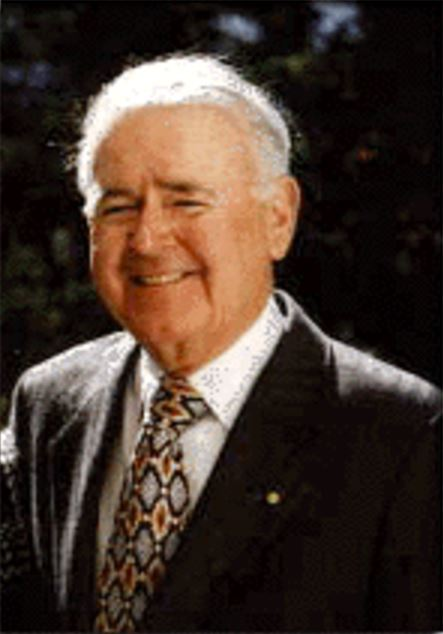
Sir William Deane

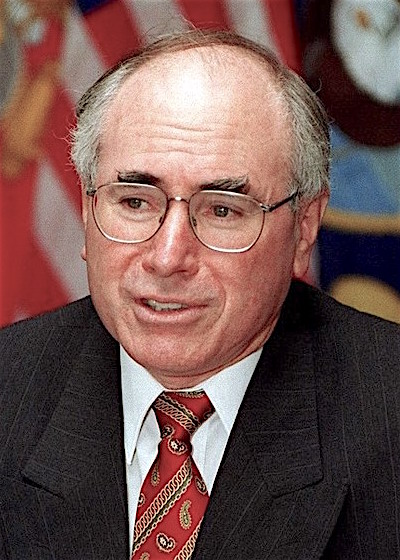
John Howard

- Monarch – Elizabeth II
- Governor-General – Sir William Deane
- Prime Minister – John Howard
  - Deputy Prime Minister – Tim Fischer
  - Opposition Leader – Kim Beazley
- Chief Justice – Sir Gerard Brennan

=== State and territory leaders ===
- Premier of New South Wales – Bob Carr
  - Opposition Leader – Peter Collins
- Premier of Queensland – Bob Borbidge
  - Opposition Leader – Peter Beattie
- Premier of South Australia – John Olsen
  - Opposition Leader – Mike Rann
- Premier of Tasmania – Tony Rundle
  - Opposition Leader – Michael Field (until 14 April), then Jim Bacon
- Premier of Victoria – Jeff Kennett
  - Opposition Leader – John Brumby
- Premier of Western Australia – Richard Court
  - Opposition Leader – Geoff Gallop
- Chief Minister of the Australian Capital Territory – Kate Carnell
  - Opposition Leader – Andrew Whitecross (until 19 August), then Wayne Berry
- Chief Minister of the Northern Territory – Shane Stone
  - Opposition Leader – Maggie Hickey
- Head of Government/Chief Minister of Norfolk Island – Michael King (until 5 May), then George Smith

=== Governors and administrators ===
- Governor of New South Wales – Gordon Samuels
- Governor of Queensland – Leneen Forde (until 29 July), then Peter Arnison
- Governor of South Australia – Eric Neal
- Governor of Tasmania – Guy Green
- Governor of Victoria – Richard McGarvie (until 23 April), then James Gobbo
- Governor of Western Australia – Michael Jeffery
- Administrator of the Australian Indian Ocean Territories – Ronald Harvey (from 1 October)
- Administrator of Norfolk Island – Alan Kerr (until 30 June), then Ralph Condon (until 3 August), then Tony Messner
- Administrator of the Northern Territory – Austin Asche (until 17 February), then Neil Conn

== Events ==
=== January ===
- 1 January – The Tri-Nation ODI cricket match at the SCG between Australia and Pakistan is marred by poor crowd behaviour. The game is interrupted six times due to pitch invasions with eight men arrested and charged with "entering a playing field" and 86 spectators ejected from the ground. NSW Minister for Sport Gabrielle Harrison asks the SCG Trust to provide her with a report with a number of options to be considered to discourage future pitch invasions. The crowd's behaviour is also condemned by Sydney district chief superintendent Darcy Cluff who also says two female police officers will be reprimanded for performing the Macarena in front of spectators during the game.
- 9 January – HMAS Adelaide rescues British yachtsman, Tony Bullimore, from the Southern Ocean, after his boat, Exide Challenger, capsized three days before.
- 17 January – After an exhaustive 18-month search, one of Australia's most wanted men, former businessman and accused paedophile Philip Bell is arrested in South Africa. The 62-year-old is arrested in Jeffreys Bay after being monitored since Interpol tipped off South African authorities about his entry to the country in October 1996. It's revealed Nelson Mandela's annual Christmas party had been interrupted so Mandela could sign a surrender warrant enabling Bell to be extradited back to Australia after his arrest. Task Force Indus had been established the previous April to gather evidence about Bell. An arrest warrant for Bell was issued by Justice James Wood who had heard evidence from Bell's alleged victims during the Royal Commission into the New South Wales Police Service.
- 20 January – Prime Minister John Howard calls a meeting of State Premiers to discuss the implications of the High Court's Wik judgment.
- 26 January – Nobel Prize winner Peter Doherty is named Australian of the Year.

=== February ===
- 4 February –
  - Prime Minister John Howard wins Parliamentary support for a constitutional convention on the republic.
  - More than 1000 residents in the South West Queensland town of Charleville are evacuated as the Warrego River floods the town. Makeshift accommodation was provided for evacuees at the local racecourse, the high school and at the showgrounds. 47 homes in Augathella are also evacuated.
- 9 February – Prime Minister John Howard announces that unemployed 16 to 20-year-olds will be forced to work up to 20 hours a week on community-based projects in trial work-for-the-dole schemes. Participants will be paid award rates and will be obliged to work only the number of hours that equate to their dole payment.
- 10 February – Prime Minister John Howard convenes meetings between miners, farmers and Aboriginal leaders, to discuss the Wik native title issue. Howard also reveals the details of the Government's Work for the Dole plan.
- 11 February – Prime Minister John Howard admits he approved a requested pay rise for one of Labor defector Mal Colston's staff shortly before last year's crucial Senate vote on the partial sale of Telstra.
- 14 February –
  - Arnott's Biscuits begins withdrawing its biscuits from supermarket shelves as authorities issue a health alert over an extortionist's poison threat. A pesticide strong enough to kill a small child had been found in some of the biscuits.
  - The New South Wales Health Department warns for the first time that oysters from Wallis Lake may be the source of a Hepatitis A outbreak after 150 cases are reported in the previous three weeks. The outbreak goes on to worsen with hundreds more people becoming infected and one man dying after eating oysters from Wallis Lake. The outbreak has a detrimental effect on the local seafood and tourism industries. It also prompts a class action to be launched against Great Lakes Council by those who became infected after eating Wallis Lake oysters. It's reported that the most likely source of the outbreak is faecal contamination from sewage overflow running into the lake onto oyster beds.
- 22 February – Reflecting on his first year in office, Prime Minister John Howard talks of a "10-year leadership transition" and said that "while my health lasts and I've got my marbles and I'm delivering good leadership and political success, you stay. But when that changes, you don't".
- 23 February – Federal Independent Senator Mal Colston denies new allegations that he had rorted his parliamentary expenses, saying the claims by a former employee were "malicious".
- 25 February – The Minister for Administrative Services, David Jull, announces a departmental investigation into Independent Senator Mal Colston's use of chauffeur-driven Commonwealth cars and warns he would have no hesitation referring the matter to police.
- 26 February – Arnott's Biscuits restocks Queensland supermarket shelves with its biscuits three weeks after it was rocked by an extortion threat. The threat has cost the company at least $10 million.

=== March ===
- 6 March – In Cairns, Paul Streeton is sentenced to life imprisonment for setting fire to school boy Tjandamurra O'Shane.
- 16 March – After a third woman goes missing from the Perth suburb of Claremont, the Western Australia Police Force confirm that they are now investigating the crimes of a serial killer in what is to become known as the Claremont serial killings.
- 24 March –
  - Senator Mal Colston admits he's guilty of claiming an extra $7,000 for travel expenses, but blames sloppy book-keeping.
  - A conscience vote by the Senate overturns the Northern Territory's controversial voluntary euthanasia legislation, The Rights of the Terminally Ill Act.
- 26 March – Prime Minister John Howard announces plans for a constitutional convention in Canberra to consider the republic issue.
- 29 March – Prime Minister John Howard arrives in Shanghai, China to promote trade relations.
- 31 March –
  - Prime Minister John Howard meets Chinese Premier Li Peng in Beijing and proposes a strategic relationship that focuses on trade, with regular military consultation and a human rights dialogue to manage differences between the two countries.
  - In what is the first case of its kind in Australia, a 14-year-old gay high school student says he intends to sue his former school, Cranebrook High School, for failing to provide a safe environment alleging he was subject to ongoing homophobic vilification. The case is expected to determine if Australian schools are liable for the safety of gay students. The case prompted much commentary in the media.

=== April ===
- 1 to 30 April – This is the driest area-averaged month since at least 1900 over New South Wales, with an average of 3.42 millimetres or 0.13 inches, over South Australia, with an average of 0.70 millimetres or 0.028 inches, and over the Murray–Darling basin, with an average of 2.13 millimetres or 0.084 inches.
- 2 April – Governor-General Sir William Deane urges action to address the widening gap in health between indigenous and non-indigenous Australians.
- 8 April –
  - Prime Minister John Howard refers travel rort allegations against Senator Mal Colston to the Australian Federal Police and calls on his to stand down as Deputy President of the Senate. Liberal Senator Bob Woods and National Party backbencher Michael Cobb are also under investigation for allegedly rorting parliamentary expenses.
  - New South Wales Premier Bob Carr announces plans to abolish or amend the law which allows diminished responsibility to be used as a legal defence.
- 9 April – Senator Mal Colston agrees to stand down as Senate Deputy President but refuses to resign from Parliament.
- 11 April – Pauline Hanson launches the One Nation party in Ipswich, Queensland.
- 14 April – Prime Minister John Howard announces that the Government will no longer accept the vote of Senator Mal Colston.
- 17 April – The Charter of Budget Honesty Act becomes law, setting a framework for sound fiscal management and informing the public about public finances.
- 21 April – Former West Australian Premier Carmen Lawrence is charged with perjury over her evidence to the 1995 Easton Royal Commission.
- 29 April – BHP announces it will end steel-making operations in Newcastle in 1999, with 2,500 job losses.
- 30 April – Prime Minister John Howard speaks on Melbourne's 3AW about Pauline Hanson saying that she is "articulating the fears and concerns and the sense of insecurity that many Australian feel at a time of change and instability. Now it's easy to sort of finger the fact that people feel uneasy and unhappy. The next step is to say, 'Okay, you've fingered the uncertainty. What are you going to do about it?'"

=== May ===
- 1 May –
  - Tasmania becomes the last state in Australia to decriminalise homosexuality.
  - Melbourne's HM Prison Pentridge is closed.
  - Foreign Affairs Minister Alexander Downer uses the launch of Asialine, a magazine for Australian business in Asia, to make a strong attack on Pauline Hanson, saying her views are offensive to people of all backgrounds. "Those views promote an insular Australia separate from the region. This is the concept of a little Australia: inward looking, narrow-minded, protectionist and disconnected from our own neighbourhood," he says.
- 5 May –
  - The position of Chief Minister of Norfolk Island is restored.
  - Prime Minister John Howard holds his first meeting with German Chancellor Helmut Kohl.
- 6 May –
  - Mal Colston resigns as Deputy President of the Senate.
  - Prime Minister John Howard appeals for an end to protests against Pauline Hanson.
  - Kerry Whelan disappeared. Believed murdered, her remains have not been located as of 4 August 2016, when the man convicted of her murder died.
- 7 May – Former Coles Myer chief Brian Quinn is sentenced to four years jail for defrauding the company of almost $4.5 million. Victorian Premier Jeff Kennett, union boss Bill Kelty and businessman Lindsay Fox had all appeared as character witnesses for Quinn.
- 8 May –
  - Melbourne's Crown Casino is opened by Victorian Premier Jeff Kennett.
  - Nine months after Pauline Hanson's maiden speech, Prime Minister John Howard directly attacks her views for the first time saying, "she is wrong when she suggests that Aboriginals are not disadvantaged. She is wrong when she says that Australia is in danger of being swamped by Asians. She is wrong to seek scapegoats for society's problems. She is wrong when she denigrates foreign investment, because it withdrawal would cost jobs. She is wrong when she claims Australia is headed for civil war".
- 13 May – Federal Treasurer Peter Costello delivers his second Federal Budget, which delivers a tax rebate of up to $450 per year on savings and a $1 billion Federation Fund for construction.
- 15 May – The Industrial Relations Commission signals the end of the traditional award system by rejecting an industry-wide claim for a wage rise.
- 20 May – The Human Rights & Equal Opportunities Commission releases a 689-page report entitled, Bringing Them Home, which states that Australian governments must apologise and pay compensation for the forced removal of Aboriginal and Torres Strait Islander children from their families. The report concludes that successive government policies of forced removal of children constitutes a crime against humanity which amounted to "genocide". It recommends a national compensation fund be established by the Commonwealth and states, as well as a national "sorry day" be held each year.
- 21 May – The Federal Government announces further cuts to immigration, halving the family reunion programme and increasing skilled migration, saying cuts are linked to high unemployment.
- 26 May – Prime Minister John Howard tables the Bringing Them Home report, saying that "personally, I feel deep sorrow for those of my fellow Australians who suffered injustices under the practices of past generations towards indigenous people...[but] Australians of this generation should not be required to accept guilt and blame for past actions and policies over which they had no control." At the Reconciliation Convention in Melbourne, some Aboriginal people turn their backs and yell at the Prime Minister in protest during his address. However, some applaud when Howard expresses his personal sorrow. Despite continuing to criticise Howard's 10-point Wik plan, Aboriginal leader Pat Dodson welcomes Howard's personal acknowledgement of the Stolen Generation and later states: "It's a start. It's a good start. I think that the Prime Minister is on the road to the acknowledgement of the things of the past. I think the fact that he said personally he was sorry is something we shouldn't lose sight of."
- 27 May – Brigitte Muir, a 39-year-old woman from Natimuk, becomes the first Australian woman to reach the summit of the world's highest mountain, Mount Everest. Upon reaching the summit, Muir also becomes the first Australian person to climb to the summit of each of the world's seven continents.
- 30 May – Prime Minister John Howard releases a ten-point plan in response to the High Court of Australia's historic Wik decision last December which recognised that native title and pastoral leases can co-exist. Key points of the plan include the permanent extinguishment of native title on freehold, exclusive-tenure leases, agricultural leases deemed to confer exclusive title and where rights are inconsistent with those of pastoralists; the removal of the right of native title-holders to negotiate over mining exploration and the imposition of a six-year unset clause to register statutory native title claims.

=== June ===
- 2 June – A former Victorian police officer is arrested for attempting to extort more than $4 million from Nestlé by contaminating Nestle products at a Coles supermarket in Sydney. He is extradited from Victoria to New South Wales where he pleads guilty. He is later sentenced to two and a half years with an additional term of three years. He attempts to explain his actions by saying he was testing the plot of a crime novel, stating: "I am an amateur novelist... I have seven novels in various stages of writing. This is the scenario for one of those novels – a crime novel."
- 5 June – Prime Minister John Howard bows to pressure from the car industry to accept a four-year freeze on car tariffs from 2000 to 2004.
- 15 June – 14-month-old Jaidyn Leskie disappears from a house in Moe, Victoria.
- 21 June – Prime Minister John Howard briefs the Queen on his plans to deal with the republic issue.
- 24 June – Prime Minister John Howard describes Australia as a racially tolerant nation in the Sir Robert Menzies Memorial Lecture in London.
- 26 June – Prime Minister John Howard arrives in Washington and is met by US Ambassador Andrew Peacock. Howard meets with President Bill Clinton on 27 June.
- 29 June – More than a year after the Port Arthur massacre, Tasmania again attracts international media attention when bush poet Peter Shoobridge murders his four children and then kills himself north of Hobart, in what becomes known as the Shoobridge family killings. The police investigating the killings are criticised by the Anglican Bishop of Tasmania Philip Newell who tells the police commissioner that the public disclosure of graphic details relating to the methods used is extremely irresponsible as it worsens the trauma of survivors. A coroner later rules Shoobridge was acting under a delusion when he killed his children, with the murders probably not premeditated.

=== July ===
- 1 July –
  - The telecommunications market is deregulated, allowing the entry of competitors other than Telstra and Optus.
  - When Britain hands back Hong Kong to China, Prime Minister John Howard warns China that it must keep its promise to maintain Hong Kong's freedom and autonomy.
- 13 July – A crowd of over 100,000 people watches the Royal Canberra Hospital implosion. A 12-year-old girl, Katie Bender, is killed instantly and nine others are injured when debris from the site travels across Lake Burley Griffin.
- 15 July –
  - Senator Mal Colston and former West Australian Liberal MP Noel Crichton-Browne are charged with fraud.
  - Two Australians are killed when a temporary wooden bridge collapses into a shallow creek at the Maccabiah Games near Tel Aviv, Israel.
- 17 July – Frank Gilford waives his right to call for the death penalty of two British nurses charged with the murder of his sister Yvonne Gilford in Saudi Arabia.
- 21 July – Former West Australian Premier Dr Carmen Lawrence pleads not guilty to giving false evidence to the Marks Royal Commission.
- 23 July – Queensland Premier Rob Borbidge criticises cuts by the Federal Government to drought relief funds.
- 24 July – The West Australian Court of Criminal Appeal quashes seven convictions against former West Australian Premier Brian Burke.
- 30 July –
  - The Thredbo landslide occurs, killing 17 people.
  - New South Wales Premier Bob Carr announces that New South Wales Police will employ Korean police and intelligence officers to help crack down on organised crime gangs as investigations continue into Korean loan-shark operations at Sydney Harbour Casino.

=== August ===
- 2 August – Stuart Diver, a ski instructor, is rescued as the sole survivor of the Thredbo landslide.
- 12 August – Victorian Premier Jeff Kennett is under fire for spending over $5,000 on a helicopter trip.
- 18 August – Aboriginal activist Burnum Burnum dies at his Woronora, Sydney home. He is particularly remembered for claiming Britain on behalf of the Aboriginal people on Australia Day 1988, while Australia celebrated its bicentenary.
- 28 August – Pauline Hanson sues the Australian Broadcasting Corporation after its youth station Triple J begins playing a new song called Backdoor Man by Pauline Pantsdown which lampoons her. The ABC later unsuccessfully appeals an injunction in the Queensland Court of Appeal preventing the song from being played on Triple J. Pantsdown later releases I Don't Like It which similarly spoofs Hanson.
- 29 August –
  - Queensland Premier Rob Borbidge denies allegations that a senior member of his government frequented a male brothel.
  - Telstra to cut another 15,000 jobs over the next three years after it revealed a big slump in profits.
- 30 August – Elections in the Northern Territory re-elect the Country Liberal Party government of Shane Stone.
- 31 August –
  - The head of Yagan, a Noongar warrior, is repatriated to Australia 164 years after being taken to the United Kingdom.
  - Prime Minister John Howard announces the names of the 36 non-parliamentary appointees to the Constitutional Convention that will discuss Australia becoming a republic. Among the names are Julie Bishop, Geoffrey Blainey, Greg Craven, Miranda Devine, Gatjil Djerrkura, Bill Hayden, Peter Hollingworth, Leonie Kramer, Richard McGarvie, Donald McGauchie, Roma Mitchell, George Mye, Lois O'Donoghue, Arvi Parbo, George Pell, Nova Peris-Kneebone, Judith Sloan, David Smith and George Winterton.

=== September ===
- 1 September – Federal Cabinet shelves plans to alter cross-media ownership laws.
- 2 September – Victorian Premier Jeff Kennett ridicules Federal Cabinet's indecision on media ownership laws. The Federal Opposition uses this to help show that the Prime Minister is weak.
- 3 September – Waterfront unions and the ACTU warn the Federal Government of widespread industrial action if the Government continues its method of reforming work conditions at seaports.
- 8 September – New South Wales Premier Bob Carr opens a world-class cancer research institute in Camperdown, Sydney.
- 11 September – BHP announces plans to cut over 800 jobs from coal mines in the Illawarra.
- 14 September – Prime Minister John Howard announces a $5 million rescue package for farmers.
- 30 September – The guns buyback amnesty expires with owners of restricted weapons now facing fines.

=== October ===
- 4 October –
  - The body of 22-year-old Japanese woman Michiko Okuyama is discovered after she disappeared from Cairns on 20 September. A 16-year-old boy later appears in the Children's Court charged with her murder. The following year, he becomes the first minor in Queensland to be sentenced to life imprisonment after being convicted of murder. He unsuccessfully appeals the severity of his sentence in 1999. Due to his age when he murdered Okuyama, his identify can never be publicly disclosed under Queensland law. Okuyama's murder is extensively covered by the Japanese media, causing hostility towards Australia. Federal tourism minister Andrew Thomson visits Cairns attempting to limit the damage to the tourism market and speaks Japanese while talking to the media urging them not to overreact. Despite his efforts, the Japanese media portray Australia as an increasingly violent and racist country, linking the murder to the views of Pauline Hanson. The murder of Michiko Okuyama is frequently described as one of the most heinous and violent crimes to have ever taken place in Far North Queensland.
  - The New South Wales Labor Party Conference delegates reject Premier Bob Carr's planned sell-off of the State's electricity assets. Carr is the first Labor Premier in fifty years to suffer a defeat at a State Party Conference.
- 9 October – Justice David Harper rejects an attempt by Catholic Archbishop of Melbourne George Pell to ban the public display of Andres Serrano's controversial artwork Piss Christ from the National Gallery of Victoria.
- 11 October —
  - A state election is held in South Australia. The Liberal/National coalition government of John Olsen is re-elected, albeit with a substantially reduced minority.
  - Andres Serrano's controversial artwork Piss Christ is damaged when a 51-year-old man removes it from the wall at the National Gallery of Victoria just two hours after Serrano's exhibition opens.
- 12 October – The National Gallery of Victoria decides to cancel Andres Serrano's exhibition after two youths destroy his controversial artwork Piss Christ with a hammer. Catholic Archbishop of Melbourne George Pell says while he understands the outrage he only supports legal and peaceful protesting.
- 15 October – Cheryl Kernot, leader of the Australian Democrats, defects to the Australian Labor Party.
- 29 October – Prime Minister John Howard has meetings in Malaysia and in Indonesia, with President Suharto, about the Asian currency crisis.
- 31 October – In a Special Commission of Inquiry hearing, five senior counsels representing Bob Carr, Justice James Wood, Peter Collins, Terry Sheahan and John Della Bosca, condemn Labor MP Franca Arena for alleging that there was a high level paedophile cover-up.

=== November ===
- 2 November – Prime Minister John Howard launches the Federal Government's anti-drug campaign.
- 5 November – Postcard bandit Brenden Abbott and four others escape from Brisbane Correctional Centre at Wacol, Brisbane.
- 13 November – Postcard bandit Brenden Abbott robs a local Commonwealth Bank branch at Palm Beach on the Gold Coast.
- 14 November –
  - Sydney is awarded the 2002 Gay Games.
  - Arnott's Biscuits shareholders overwhelmingly approve a takeover bid from American conglomerate Campbell's.
- 15 November – Two men are charged with murders of Lauren Barry and Nichole Collins.
- 17 November – Telstra shares are listed on the Australian Securities Exchange.
- 26 November – Sydney's Star City Casino is opened by New South Wales Premier Bob Carr.

=== December ===
- 3 December
  - Queensland Premier Rob Borbidge announces nearly $30 million to bail out the Queensland Ambulance Service, but unions say it is not enough.
  - The first of the Federal Government's Work for the Dole schemes begins in Sydney.
- 9 December – The Australian Banking Association doubles the bounty on the head of bank robber Brendan Abbott.
- 19 December – Postcard bandit Brenden Abbott robs the Yirrigan Drive branch of the Commonwealth Bank in Perth, disguised as a businessman in a grey wig and a false moustache and brandishing a .45 Webley, stealing $300,000.
- 26 December – The final figures for the nationwide guns buyback are released: 640,000 weapons were surrendered across Australia with New South Wales providing the poorest number of returns.

== Arts and literature ==
- 3 June – David Foster's novel The Glade within the Grove wins the Miles Franklin Award
- 17 September – Robert Drewe's The Drowner wins Book of the Year at the New South Wales Premier's Literary Awards
- 22 September – Brisbane pop group Savage Garden wins a record 10 ARIA awards.

== Film ==
- The Castle
- Doing Time for Patsy Cline
- Blackrock
- The Wiggles Movie
- 24 March – Queensland-born actor Geoffrey Rush wins "Best Actor" at the 69th Academy Awards for his portrayal of pianist David Helfgott in the movie Shine. He is the first Australian to win the Best Actor Oscar since Peter Finch in 1976 for the film Network. Australian cinematographer John Seale wins an Oscar for his work on the film The English Patient.
- 3 September – The Castle, a film that cost $700,000 to make and was shot in 11 days, passes $10 million at the box office.

== Television ==
- 7 March – The Sydney Gay and Lesbian Mardi Gras is televised on commercial television for the first time when a 90-minute highlights package hosted by Tottie Goldsmith is aired on Network 10, almost a week after the event.
- 22 May – Television journalist Jana Wendt accepts a $1.2 million settlement and ends her legal action against the Seven Network after receiving a death threat. Wendt had taken Seven to court to be released from a contract she had signed with the network, claiming she had been misled when lured from the Nine Network to host Witness with a promise it was to be a high quality program.
- 24 May – The Footy Show panellist Sam Newman sustains a broken leg and ankle after being injured in an incident outside his home in Melbourne. Although originally reported that he had been crushed while attempting to help his girlfriend park in his garage, Newman later admits the incident occurred following an argument but denies it was deliberate. He claims he had exited the car and was walking alongside the vehicle when his girlfriend drove off, knocking him over, stating: "She said something to me and I walked around to find out what it was. She was in the process of driving off and that's when this accident happened."
- 1 July – Prime Television comes to Mildura, ending a monopoly on commercial television held by STV-8 since 1965.
- 11 July – Long running American-Canadian children's animated series Arthur premieres on ABC TV.
- 1 November – TCN-9 stages the first trial of digital television in the Southern Hemisphere.
- 20 December – American animated comedy series South Park is launched on SBS becoming the network's highest rating series to date.

== Sport ==
- 27 February – First day of the Australian Track & Field Championships for the 1996–1997 season, which are held at the Olympic Park in Melbourne, Victoria. The 5,000 metres was conducted at the Nike Classic, Melbourne on 20 February. The men's decathlon event was conducted at the Hobart Grand Prix on 15–16 February 1997.
- 1 March – The Australian Super League competition commences with 2 matches, with the Brisbane Broncos defeating the Auckland Warriors 14–2 in Brisbane & the North Queensland Cowboys defeating the Adelaide Rams 24–16 in Townsville.
- 2 March – Greg Blewett and Steve Waugh bat the whole day during the first test match at Johannesburg against South Africa.
- 7 March – The ARL competition kicks off with the Parramatta Eels defeating the North Sydney Bears 10–8 at Parramatta Stadium.
- 19 May – In the one and only Super League Tri-series, New South Wales defeat Queensland 23–22 in the longest (104 minutes) & one of the most exciting games of representative rugby league ever played.
- 25 May – Brisbane Strikers create history by winning the NSL Grand Final, a 2–0 victory over Sydney United. The achievement was the first NSL title in their history, the first time a Queensland side had won the title, and all in front of a record crowd of 40,446 at Suncorp Stadium.
- 28 May 1997 – Swimmer Scott Miller is involved in a late night altercation outside a Canberra takeaway shop in which he sustains a dislocated finger. The scuffle leads to his expulsion from the Australian Institute of Sport where there are already concerns about his attitude and apparent lack of commitment to training sessions.
- 13 July – Patrick Carroll wins his second men's national marathon title, clocking 2:11:21 in Brisbane, while Susan Hobson claims her second women's title in 2:32:43.
- 4 August – Cathy Freeman becomes the first Australian woman to win a title at the World Athletics Championships, after her triumph in the 400 metres event in Athens in 49.77 seconds.
- 10 August – Australia retains the Ashes after beating England by 264 runs in the Fifth Test at Trent Bridge Nottingham. The win gives Australia its fifth consecutive series victory, an ascendancy they've held since winning the 1989 series in England.
- 22 August – The Melbourne Phoenix defeat the Adelaide Thunderbirds 58–48 in the inaugural Commonwealth Bank Trophy netball grand final
- 7 September – Pat Rafter wins the US Open, defeating Britain's Greg Rusedski 6–3, 6–2, 4–6, 7–5 to claim Australia's first grand slam tournament title since Pat Cash won Wimbledon in 1987.
- 17 September – The Melbourne Storm rugby league team is founded.
- 20 September – The Brisbane Broncos defeat the Cronulla Sharks 26–8 at ANZ Stadium (now Elizabeth II stadium) to become premiers of the Super League (Australia) season 1997. It is the first night grand final played in rugby league.
- 27 September – The Adelaide Crows (19.11.125) defeat the St Kilda Saints (13.16.94) to win the 101st VFL/AFL. It is the first premiership for Adelaide & the first time the AFL flag has left Victoria since 1994.
- 28 September – In one of, if not the most exciting grand final ever played, the Newcastle Knights defeat minor premiers the Manly-Warringah Sea Eagles 22–16 to win the 90th NSWRL/ARL premiership. It is the first premiership for Newcastle & it was the third consecutive grand final appearance for Manly. The South Queensland Crushers finish in last position in their final season, claiming their second consecutive wooden spoon.
- 4 November – Melbourne Cup at Flemington won by Might And Power ridden by Jim Cassidy and trained by Jack Denham. The winning time was 3:18.3 and the placegetters were Doremus and Markham. The race was also noteworthy because of serial pest Peter Hore who ran onto the track during the race.
- 29 November – In what has come to be known as the Iran game, the Socceroos draw 2–2 with Iran at the Melbourne Cricket Ground after leading 2–0. The game is interrupted when spectator Peter Hore cut up Iran's goal net. Iran qualifies for the 1998 FIFA World Cup on the away goals rule.
- 19 December – After a series of meetings at the Sydney Football Stadium (now Sydney Football Stadium), the Super League war is declared over. The ARL & Super League agree to form the National Rugby League, and the Perth Reds, Hunter Mariners & South Queensland Crushers are shut down to give a 20-team competition for 1998, with the newly founded Melbourne Storm becoming part of the unified competition that season. The NRL is to be reduced to 14 teams for 2000 after reform.

== Births ==
- 1 January – Keegan Hipgrave, rugby league player
- 10 January – Blake Lawrie, rugby league player
- 11 January – Cody Simpson, swimmer and singer
- 16 January – Jarome Luai, rugby league player
- 17 January – Jack Vidgen, singer
- 20 January – Rheed McCracken, athletics competitor
- 22 January – Brock Lamb, rugby league player
- 3 February – Mitchell Dunn, rugby league player
- 11 February – Rosé, singer
- 15 February – Joseph Tramontana, rugby league player
- 18 February – Evie Ferris, ballerina and member of children's band The Wiggles
- 19 February
  - Paige Greco, Paralympic cyclist (d. 2025)
  - Brad Parker, rugby league player
- 6 March – Daniel De Silva, footballer
- 20 March – Wayde Egan, rugby league player
- 11 April – Georgia Bohl, Olympic swimmer
- 18 April – Siosifa Talakai, rugby league player
- 27 April – Jesse Ramien, rugby league player
- 11 May – Morgan Baker, actor
- 13 May – Reimis Smith, rugby league player
- 10 June – Fletcher O'Leary, actor
- 16 June – Latrell Mitchell, rugby league player
- 18 June – Cory Denniss, rugby league player
- 26 June
  - Jacob Elordi, actor
  - Jack Murchie, rugby league player
- 27 June – Felix Dean, actor
- 30 June - Reuben Garrick, Rugby League Player
- 3 July – Jordan Mailata, American football and rugby league player
- 14 July – Brodie Croft, rugby league player
- 21 July
  - Josh Ralph, rugby league player
  - Tom Wright, rugby player
- 25 July – Nat Butcher, rugby league player
- 2 August – Phillip Sami, rugby league player
- 4 August – Sam Stone, rugby league player
- 5 August – Jack Cogger, rugby league player
- 17 August – Tyronne Roberts-Davis, rugby league player
- 18 August – Josephine Langford, actress
- 6 September – Jai Field, rugby league player
- 9 September – Billy Bainbridge, rugby league player
- 10 September – Nick Meaney, rugby league player
- 12 October – Curtis Scott, rugby league player
- 15 October – Jack Johns, rugby league player
- 14 November – Nathan Cleary, rugby league player
- 27 December – Gideon Gela-Mosby, rugby league player

== Deaths ==
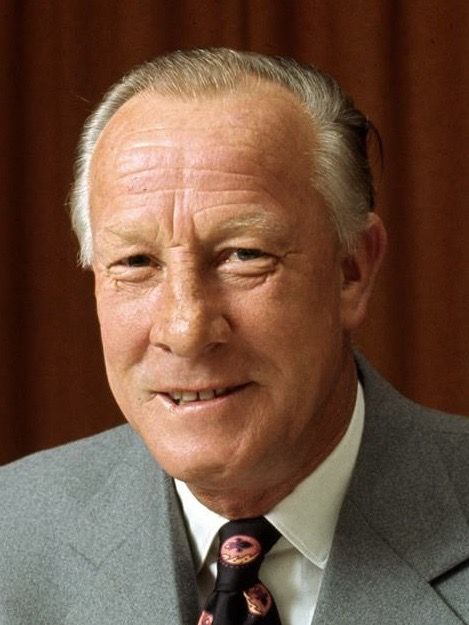
Lance Barnard

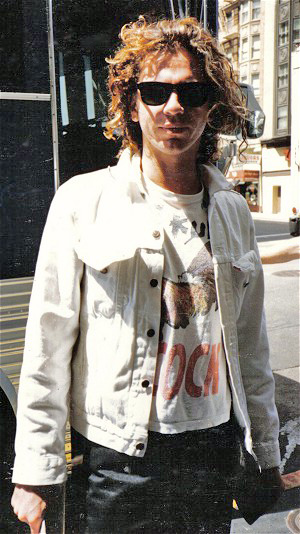
Michael Hutchence

- 17 January – Bert Kelly, South Australian politician (b. 1912)
- 31 January – John Panizza, Western Australian politician (b. 1931)
- 16 March – Harry Holgate, 36th Premier of Tasmania (b. 1933)
- 10 April – Clinton Haines, computer hacker (b. 1976)
- 12 April – Sir Eric Pearce, television newsreader (born in the United Kingdom) (b. 1905)
- 21 April – Laurence Henry Hicks, military bandmaster and composer (born in the United Kingdom) (b. 1912)
- 25 April – Brian May, film composer (b. 1934)
- 2 May – John Carew Eccles, psychologist (died in Switzerland) (b. 1903)
- 21 May – William Aston, New South Wales politician (b. 1916)
- 15 June
  - Jaidyn Leskie, murder victim (b. 1996)
  - Dal Stivens, writer (b. 1911)
- 11 July – Jock Sturrock, Olympic yachtsman (b. 1915)
- 13 July – Sir Garfield Barwick, 7th Chief Justice of Australia and New South Wales politician (b. 1903)
- 6 August – Lance Barnard, 3rd Deputy Prime Minister of Australia (b. 1919)
- 17 August – Burnum Burnum, Indigenous activist, sportsman and actor (b. 1936)
- 5 September – Brian Grieve, botanist (b. 1907)
- 12 September – Archer Denness, soldier (b. 1914)
- 16 September – Anne Kerr, Lady Kerr, 19th Spouse of the Governor-General of Australia and interpreter (b. 1914)
- 29 October – Nugget Coombs, public servant and economist (b. 1906)
- 5 November – Peter Jackson, rugby league footballer (b. 1964)
- 6 November – Jane Thurgood-Dove, murder victim (b. 1963)
- 22 November – Michael Hutchence, singer, songwriter and actor (b. 1960)

== See also ==
- 1997 in Australian television
- List of Australian films of 1997
