= AWGIE Award for Stage =

Theatre writing award

The AWGIE Award for Stage is awarded by the Australian Writers' Guild at the annual AWGIE Awards for Australian performance writing. The award is for the playscript. To be eligible, the play must have had its first professional production (as distinct from reading) in the previous year.

David Williamson has received the award five times, over the period 1972 to 1988. Andrew Bovell has also won five times (once jointly), over the period 1997 to 2014. Hannie Rayson, Nick Enright, Patricia Cornelius and Tom Holloway have all won three times.

== Winners ==
Award recipients include:

- 1971: Michael Boddy & Bob Ellis for The Legend of King O'Malley^{*}
- 1972: David Williamson for The Removalists^{*}
- 1973: David Williamson for Don's Party
- 1974: Dorothy Hewett for Bonbons and Roses for Dolly and Ron Blair for President Wilson in Paris
- 1975: Jim McNeil for How Does Your Garden Grow?^{*}
- 1976: Not awarded
- 1977: Steve J. Spears for The Elocution of Benjamin Franklin^{*}
- 1978: David Williamson for The Club^{*}
- 1979: Ron Blair for Marx
- 1980: David Williamson for Travelling North and David Allen for Upside Down at the Bottom of the World
- 1981: Gordon Graham for Demolition Job
- 1982: Ron Elisha for Einstein^{*}
- 1983: Stephen Sewell for Welcome the Bright World
- 1984: Ron Elisha for Two
- 1985: John Upton for Machiavelli Machiavelli
- 1986: Jack Davis for No Sugar and Hannie Rayson for Room to Move
- 1987: Michael Gow for Away^{*}
- 1988: David Williamson for Emerald City
- 1989: Paul M. Davies for On Shifting Sandshoes
- 1990: Nick Enright for Daylight Saving^{*}
- 1991: Hannie Rayson for Hotel Sorrento
- 1992: Gordon Graham for The Boys
- 1993: Alma DeGroen for The Girl Who Saw Everything
- 1994: Nicholas Parsons for Dead Heart
- 1995: Scott Taylor for Clipped Wings
- 1996: Nick Enright for Blackrock
- 1997: Andrew Bovell for Speaking in Tongues
- 1998: Andrea Lemon for Rodeo Noir^{*}
- 1999: Andrew Bovell, Patricia Cornelius, Melissa Reeves, Christos Tsiolkas for Who's Afraid of the Working Class^{*} and Justin Monjo & Nick Enright for Cloudstreet^{*}
- 2000: Timothy Daly for The Private Visions of Gottfried Kellner
- 2001: Hannie Rayson for Life After George
- 2002: Andrew Bovell for Holy Day
- 2003: Katherine Thomson with Angela Chaplin & Kavisha Mazzella for Mavis Goes To Timor
- 2004: Stephen Sewell for Myth, Propaganda and Disaster in Nazi Germany and Contemporary America
- 2005: Melissa Reeves for The Spook^{*}
- 2006: Patricia Cornelius for Love
- 2007: Tommy Murphy for Holding The Man
- 2008: Tom Holloway for Beyond the Neck
- 2009: Andrew Bovell for When the Rain Stops Falling
- 2010: Tom Holloway for And No More Shall We Part
- 2011: Patricia Cornelius for Do Not Go Gentle^{*}
- 2012: Lachlan Philpott for Silent Disco
- 2013: Kate Mulvany & Anne-Louise Sarks for Medea
- 2014: Andrew Bovell for The Secret River
- 2015: Donna Abela for Jump for Jordan
- 2016: Angus Cerini for The Bleeding Tree
- 2017: Leah Purcell for The Drover's Wife^{*}
- 2018: Michelle Lee for Rice
- 2019: Kate Mulvany for The Harp in the South^{*}
- 2020: Suzie Miller for Prima Facie^{*}
- 2021: Kodie Bedford for Cursed!^{*}
- 2022/23: Maxine Mellor for Horizon [original]; Elaine Acworth for My Father's Wars [adapted]
- 2024: Dylan Van Den Berg for Whitefella Yella Tree [original]; Tom Holloway for Museum of Modern Love [adapted]
- 2025: Hilary Bell for Summer of Harold [original]; Verity Laughton for The Dictionary of Lost Words [adapted]

== Footnotes ==
^* Also awarded the Major AWGIE Award across all categories
