= 56th AWGIE Awards =

Award ceremony for writing of 2023

The 56th annual AWGIE Awards, presented by the Australian Writers' Guild, took place on 15 February 2024 at the Parade Theatre at National Institute of Dramatic Art, Sydney. The nominations were announced on 17 January 2024. This marks the first ceremony to be held in February, as it was previously held in November.

== Winners and nominees ==
Winners are listed first and highlighted in boldface.

=== Film ===
**Feature Film – Original**
- **Late Night with the Devil – Colin Cairnes and Cameron Cairnes**
  - Head South – Jonathan Ogilvie
  - The New Boy – Warwick Thornton
  - The Rooster – Mark Leonard Winter
**Feature Film – Adapted**
- **The Royal Hotel – Oscar Redding with Kitty Green; based on the documentary Hotel Coolgardie by Pete Gleeson**
  - Blueback – Robert Connolly; based on the novel by Tim Winton
**Short Film**
- **Jia – Vee Shi**
  - IMOAN – Catherine Kelleher
  - Tuī Ná – William Duan
  - Voice Activated – Steve Anthopoulos

=== Documentary ===
**Documentary – Public Broadcast (Including VOD) or Exhibition**
- **Volcano Man – Tim Russell with James Crawley and Steven Sander**
  - The Defenders – Matthew Bate
  - Harley & Katya – Blayke Hoffman with Selina Miles
  - John Farnham: Finding the Voice – Poppy Stockell with Paul Clarke
**Documentary – Community, Educational, and Training**
- **Imagined Touch – Sofya Gollan**

=== Television ===
**Television – Serial**
- **Neighbours: Episode 8867 – Sarah Mayberry (Network 10)**
  - EastEnders: Episode 6593 – Peter Mattessi (BBC UKTV)
  - Home and Away: Episode 7949 – Paige Montague (Seven Network)
  - Home and Away: Episode 7959 – Louise Bowes (Seven Network)
  - Neighbours: Episode 8903 – Jason Herbison (Network 10)
**Television – Series**
- **The Great: "Ice" – Tony McNamara (Hulu)**
  - The Newsreader: "People Like You and Me" – Kim Ho (ABC)
  - Totally Completely Fine: "Not All Heroes Carry a Vape" – Keir Wilkins (Stan)
**Television – Limited Series**
- **The House Across the Street – Giula Sandler (5)**
  - The Clearing: "Maitreya" – Elise McCredie (Disney+)
  - The Lost Flowers of Alice Hart – Sarah Lambert, Kirsty Fisher, and Kim Wilson (Prime Video)
**Comedy – Situation or Narrative**
- **Colin from Accounts: "Flash" – Harriet Dyer (Binge)**
  - A Christmas Ransom – Elliot Vella, Gretel Vella, and Timothy Walker (Stan)
  - Colin from Accounts: "The Good Room" – Patrick Brammall (Binge)
  - In Limbo: "Cremating" – Tamara Asmar (ABC iview)
**Comedy – Sketch or Light Entertainment**
- **The Last Year of Television: "2022" – Mitch McTaggart (Binge)**
  - Gruen Nation: "Pawesome" – James Colley and Bec Melrose with Kirsten Drysdale, Angela Lavoipierre, and Cameron James (ABC)
  - The Weekly: "The Week in TV featuring Margaret Pomeranz" – Rob Hunter (ABC)

=== Children's Television ===
**Children's Television – 'P' Classification (Preschool – Under 5 Years)**
- **Beep and Mort: "Nothing to Do Day" – Charlotte Rose Hamlyn (ABC Kids)**
  - Beep and Mort: "My Best Friend" – Amy Stewart (ABC Kids)
  - Kangaroo Beach: "Hoppy Christmas Ghërkinn" – Charlotte Rose Hamlyn and Tim Bain (ABC Kids)
  - Kangaroo Beach: "King Kanga" – Rebekka Schafferius (ABC Kids)
**Children's Television – 'C' Classification (Children's – 5-14 Years)**
- **Crazy Fun Park: "Remember Me" – Magda Wozniak (ABC Me)**
  - Crazy Fun Park: "I Don't Wanna Grow Up" – Nicholas Verso (ABC Me)
  - Mikki vs the World: "Broken Hearts and Stinky Farts" – Gemma Bird Matheson (ABC Me)
  - Turn Up the Volume: "The Less I Know the Better" – Matthew Bon (ABC Me)
  - Turn Up the Volume: "Spinning Around" – Chloe Wong and Penelope Chai (ABC Me)

=== Audio ===
**Audio – Fiction**
- **The Missed – Sami Shah**
  - Gripped: You Don't Know Me: "Is There Anything Else You Remember?" – Jacklyn Bassanelli
  - Starship Q Star: "First Contact-ish" – Meegan May and Lauren Anderson
**Audio – Non-Fiction**
- **Disclosed: The Children in the Pictures: "Crimes Without Borders" – Simon Nasht and Akhim Dev**

=== Stage ===
**Stage – Original**
- **Whitefella Yella Tree – Dylan Van Den Berg**
  - The End of Winter – Noëlle Janaczewska
  - Everyman and His Dog – Ron Elisha
  - Never Closer – Grace Chapple
  - The Return – John Harvey
  - Wayside Bride – Alana Valentine
**Stage – Adapted**
- **Museum of Modern Love – Tom Holloway; based on the novel The Museum of Modern Love by Heather Rose**
  - Are We There Yet? – Finegan Kruckemeyer; based on the picture book by Alison Lester
  - Looking for Alibrandi – Vidya Rajan; based on the novel by Melina Marchetta
**Musical Theatre**
- **Watershed: The Death of Dr Duncan – Alana Valentine and Christos Tsiolkas**
  - Dubbo Championship Wrestling – Daniel Cullen with James Cullen
**Community and Youth Theatre**
- **Ngadjung – Dylan Van Den Berg**
  - The Chapel, the Fire and the Dead Cat – Madelaine Nunn
  - How to Vote! Or, the Repercussions of Political Ambition and Personal Rivalries within Student Leadership and Media Organisations in the Context of the Post-COVID-19 Neoliberal University Institution – Julian Larnach
**Theatre for Young Audience**
- **All the Shining Lights – Brendan Hogan**
  - Past the Shallows – Julian Larnach
  - The Sleep that Ceased to Settle – Finegan Kruckemeyer

=== Other categories ===
**Animation**
- **Koala Man: "The Red Hot Rule" – Nina Oyama (Disney+)**
  - Bird Drone – Clare Toonen
  - The Sandman: "Dream of a Thousand Cats" – Catherine Smyth-McMullen (Netflix)
  - The Strange Chores: "Help Manga Charlie" – Alix Beane (ABC Me)
**Web Series and Other Non-Broadcast/Non-'Subscription Video on Demand' TV Short Works**
- **Night Bloomers: "Friend or Foe" – Andrew Undi Lee**
  - Appetite: "Dead Ahead" and "Pho Ken What" – Mohini Herse, Neilesh Verma, and Grace Tan
  - Childish Deano: "Show and Tell" and "Apology" – David Ferrier and Dean Thomas
  - Latecomers: "I Woke Up with Cerebral Palsy Again" and "Great Boobs" – Emma Myers, Nina Oyama, and Angus Thompson
  - Night Bloomers: "Striking Hair Pins" – Ra Chapman
