= Rennie Fritschy =

Mining resource exec

Ronald Carl "Rennie" Fritschy AM is an Australian business executive, best known for his work in the mining and resource sector.

For eight years, Fritschy was managing director of Queensland Alumina Limited. During his career, Fritschy has also worked within the nickel, petrochemical and textile fields. He lists his time at Queensland Alumina and being the site manager of Nabalco in Gove as two career highlights.

In 2004, Fritschy was appointed as Central Queensland University's second chancellor, taking over from the university's original chancellor, Stanley Jones. Fritschy retired from the role in 2016. At the university's 25th anniversary celebrations in 2017, both Fritschy and Jones were recognised for the work they did as chancellors by being appointed as emeritus chancellors of the university.

Fritschy was recognised with an AM in the 2016 Australia Day Honours, for his significant service to higher education and for his services in the mining and resource sector.
