= D86 =

D86 may refer to:

- D86 (debugger), a debugger associated with the A86 software
- HMS Agincourt (D86), a Royal Navy Battle class destroyer
- HMS Birmingham (D86), a Royal Navy Type 42 destroyer
- HMS Hawkins (D86), a Royal Navy Hawkins class cruisers
- Sequoia Field airport FAA location identifier
- Grünfeld Defence, Encyclopaedia of Chess Openings code
- A method for automated distillation by ASTM
