= Clinton Haines =

Australian computer hacker

- Born: 10 April 1976; Brisbane, Australia
- Died: 10 April 1997 (aged 21); Saint Lucia, Queensland, Australia
- Other names: Harry McBungus; TaLoN; Terminator-Z
- Occupation: Hacker

Clinton 'Clint' Haines (10 April 1976 – 10 April 1997) was an Australian computer hacker. He was also known as Harry McBungus, TaLoN and Terminator-Z.

Haines attended Ipswich Grammar School. He wrote his first computer virus in assembly language using the A86 assembler in the early 1990s.

Haines was responsible for the viruses NoFrills, Dudley, X-Fungus/PuKE, Daemaen and 1984. NoFrills infected the Australian Taxation Office (ATO). It was described by anti-virus company manager Len Grooves as "a very average virus ... It could have been written by any first-year computer student ... it had serious design faults and programming bugs." Nevertheless, the ATO decided to turn off all of its 15,000 computers until the virus was eradicated, to avoid the infection spreading.

His virus Dudley also infected the computers of Telecom Australia), shutting down their system in two hours. The Dudley virus was a variant of the No Frills code with the text [Oi Dudley!][PuKE].

Haines died from a heroin overdose in 1997, in Saint Lucia, Brisbane, celebrating his 21st birthday. At the time of his death he was completing an undergraduate science degree in microbiology at the University of Queensland. A computer virus was written in his honour (RIP Terminator-Z by VLAD). The virus, named 'Memorial', pays acknowledgement to Haines by placing a message on an infected user's screen.
