= Beyond the Neck =

2007 play by Tom Holloway

- Original language: English
- Written by: Tom Holloway
- Characters: 1 (boy); 2 (teenage girl); 3 (young mother and wife); 4 (old man)
- Subject: Set 10 years after the Port Arthur Massacre, the play investigates the long-lasting and traumatic effects of the event upon survivors and other Australians.
- Genre: Verbatim
- Setting: Port Arthur, Tasmania; 2006

Premiere
- Date: 12 September 2007
- Place: Peacock Theatre, Hobart

Beyond the Neck is a play written by the Australian playwright Tom Holloway and published by Brisbane's Playlab Press in 2008, as the first full-length play that Holloway created. The play is divided into two halves, "The First Movement" and "The Second Movement". It is based upon the stories and testimonies of the victims of the 1996 Port Arthur Massacre and is centred at the Broad Arrow Café in Tasmania where the event took place. In 2004, as part of the Melbourne International Arts Festival, La Mama chose an early draft of the script to further develop, and so in 2005, with funding from the Australian Council of Arts, Holloway began the process of researching the event of the Port Arthur Massacre and interviewing those most affected. The play was included in the NSW HSC Drama Syllabus from 2015-2018.

== Characters ==
1 - 7 year old boy

Although the young boy has no clear connection to the Port Arthur Massacre, he is included to show the effects of grief and the differing ways in which individuals deal with it. Feeling lonely and forgotten by his parents, the young boy invents an imaginary friend to keep him company named Michael. The young boy constantly talks to Michael throughout the play, and it becomes known that the imaginary friend is a bad influence, encouraging him to perform violent and sadistic acts, as well as the inappropriate joke that triggers the character's flashbacks towards the end of the play.

2 - 17 year old girl

The teenage girl remains largely affected by the events of the Port Arthur Massacre, her father a victim of Martin Bryant. Struggling to deal with his death, she turns to conspiracy theories to explain the events of that day. Due to her mother's quick rebound with her father's best friend, the young girl struggles to connect with them and accept herself within her family. The trip to Port Arthur brings up a multitude of emotions for the character, as seeing the Port Arthur Memorial Garden and commemorative plaque, as well as her conversation with Character 4, allows her to finally understand the reality of the massacre and what happened to her father.

3 - 28 year old woman

Character 3 is another individual included to demonstrate the way in which people come to terms with their grief. For the majority of the play, she speaks to her husband David and her child Molly, as they travel on a bus tour around Tasmania with a group of elderly people. It is only at the end of the play, however, when her flashbacks are triggered, that it becomes clear that David and Molly are only memories conjured by her imagination. The two were killed in a car accident, and though some time has passed the young woman continues to struggle to accept the reality of their death.

4 - 75 year old man

One of the most important characters within the play, the old man works at the Broad Arrow Café where the massacre took place, and was a direct witness to its atrocities. He suffers significant post-traumatic stress disorder, with flashbacks regularly plaguing him throughout the entirety of the play. The most significant of his episodes occurs at the climax of Beyond the Neck, when Character 1 pretends that a massacre is happening again as a joke. The old man believes that he, and everyone around him, is in danger and thus reacts quickly. The monumental physical and emotional toll of witnessing the massacre is made clear to the audience through his monologue, as he describes in significant depth particular details about the event, such as the woman covered in blood who hugged him.

A visitor

This character can be played by any one of the actors, required only for the "Coda" at the end of the play.

== Plot summary ==
=== "Tune Up" ===
Instruction for the director to raise all lights to full brightness and then slowly dim them, as the characters walk on stage and touch up their outfits before the lights dim to absolute darkness and the play begins.

=== "Overture" ===
Beyond the Neck begins with the "Overture", in which the location of the play, Port Arthur, is introduced. The character "4" (old man), details the negative history of the location, speaking of the hardships of the convicts who lived in the penal settlement in the 1800s (see History Port Arthur, Tasmania). The characters "1" (boy), "2" (teenage girl), "3" (young mother and wife), and "4" (old man) are then introduced, through direct address and as the musical quartet piece that Holloway intended. The "Overture" acts as a prologue to the characters and their backstories, placing them in relation to the events of the Port Arthur Massacre.

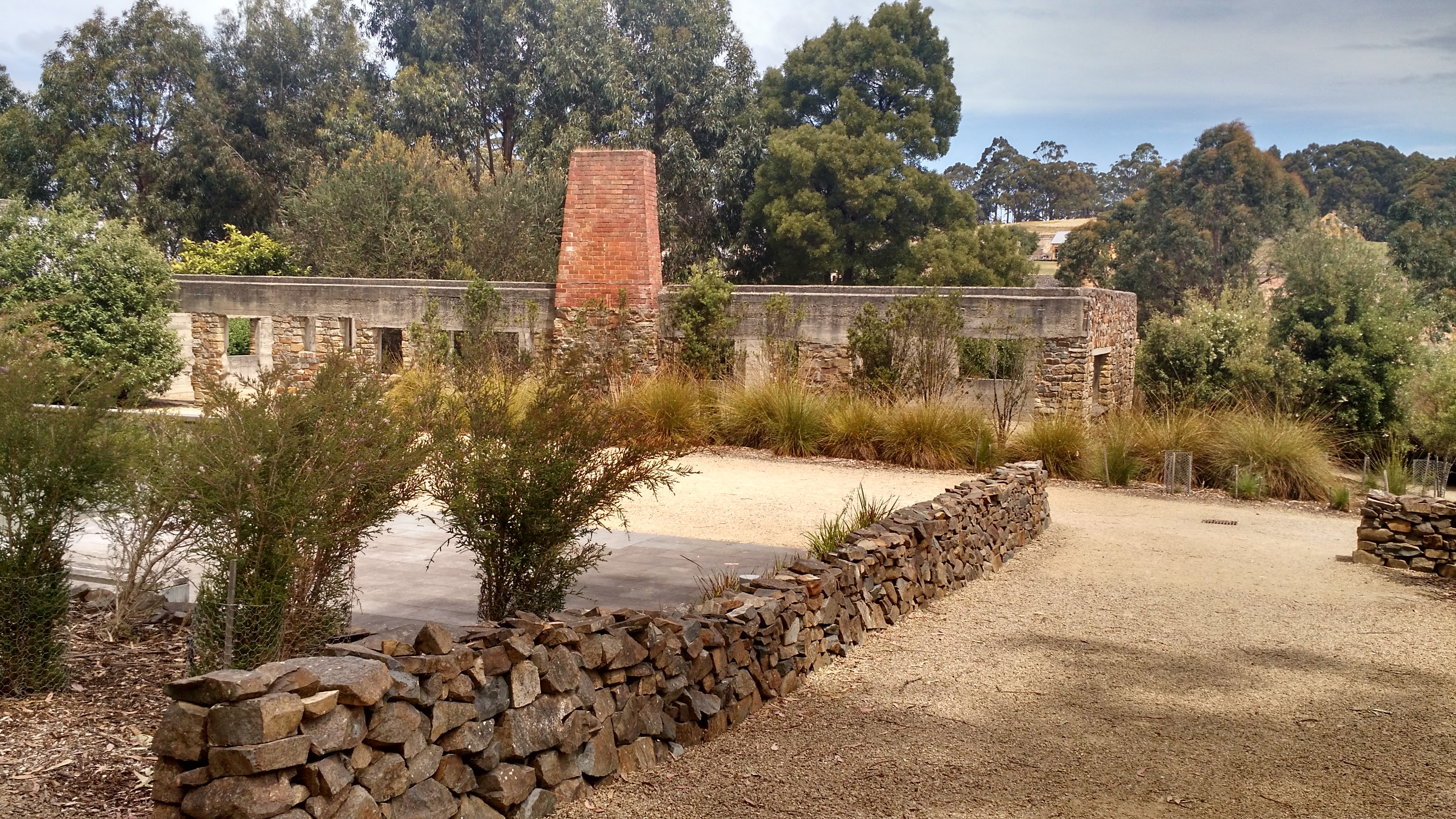
Port Arthur Memorial Garden

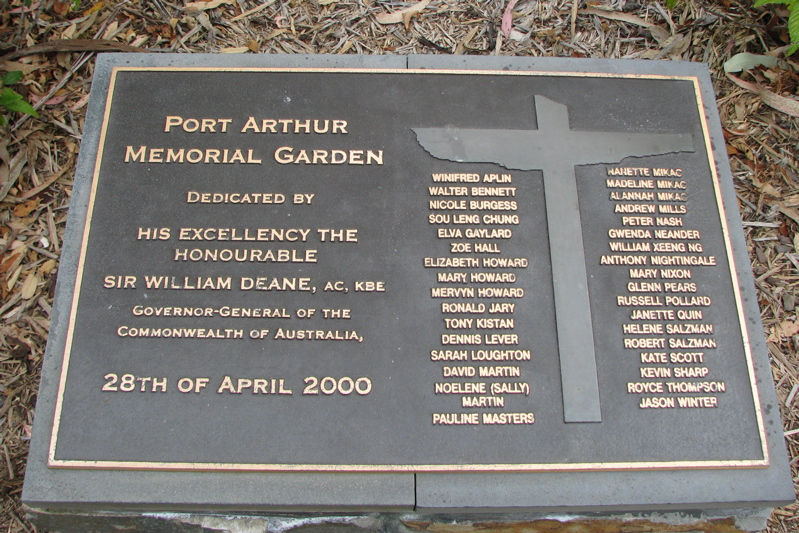
Commemorative memorial to the victims of the Port Arthur Massacre

=== "Setting Off" ===
The next part of the play, "Setting Off", brings the characters to the ten year anniversary of the Port Arthur Massacre, revealing that the tragedies of the event continue to haunt them to the present day. It is within this section that Holloway's employment of imperatives to remove the audience's emotional attachment to the piece, a Brechtian technique, is exhibited.

=== "The Trip Down" ===
This section of the play details the character's separate journeys as they begin to travel to the Broad Arrow Café in Port Arthur, where the massacre took place. Although they do not travel together, their stories intertwine as they interrupt and talk over the top of each other, contributing to Holloway's intention of creating a musical quartet and chorus, as he outlines in the "Important Note to Actors and Director".

=== "Arrival" ===
Adding to the character's backstories, "The Arrival" continues to examine the trauma that the four characters are dealing with, as their arrival to the location of the massacre, Port Arthur, causes them to have flashbacks triggered by post-traumatic stress disorder. The characters continue to act as narrators for each other, revealing more and more small details of information with each line that passes. More information about the Port Arthur Massacre begins to come to light within a conversation between Character 1 and his father.

=== "The Tour" ===
All four characters come together for this scene of the play to participate in the tour of Port Arthur, and Character 4's opening introduction in the "Overture" is repeated. Character 2 and 4 both have flashbacks to the events of the Port Arthur Massacre, and Character 1's uncomfortable and inappropriate joke triggers post-traumatic stress disorder for all of the character's once more. This scene finally reveals the violence associated with Michael and the park for Character 1, and ultimately allows Character 2 to accept her father's death.

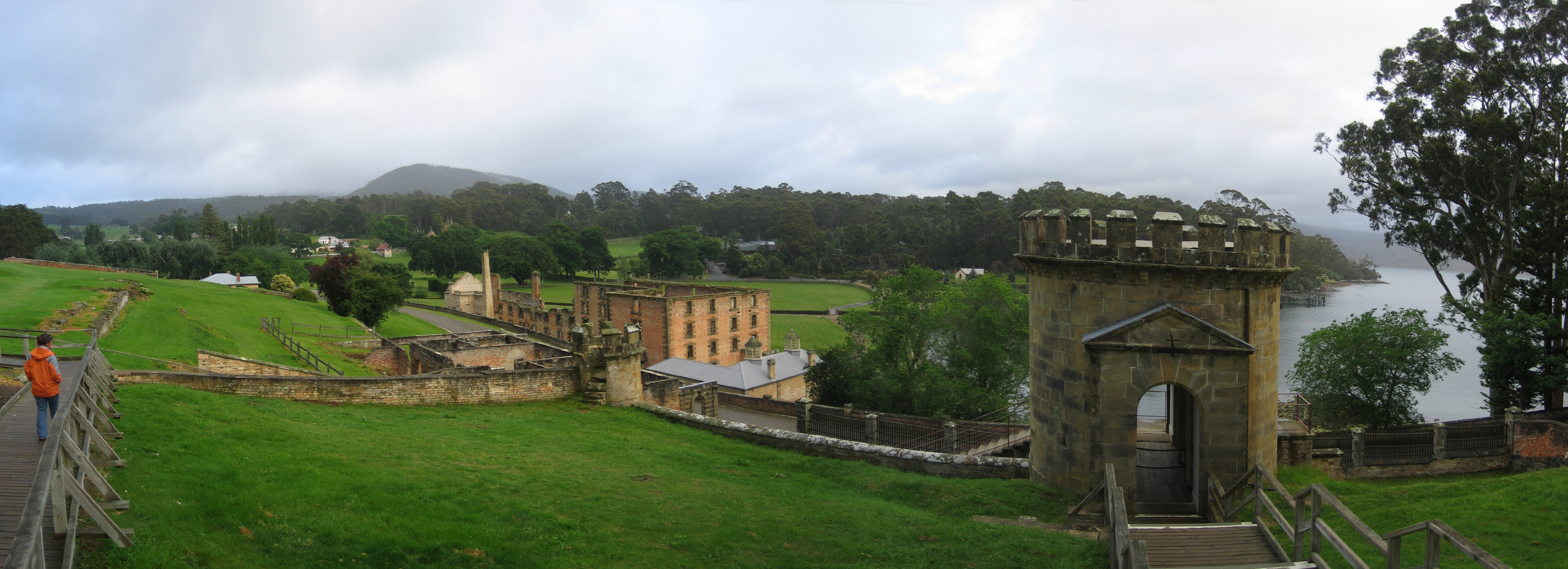
Port Arthur

=== "The Point of No Return" ===
It is within this section of the play that the characters finally interact, with Character 3 talking to Character 1 on a park bench and Character 4 finally telling Character 2 of the events of the Port Arthur Massacre. The conversations trigger flashbacks for the characters, and it is finally revealed that Character 3's husband and daughter are actually dead and she has been hallucinating them throughout the entire play.

=== "Coda" ===
A visitor describes the location of Port Arthur, and a sense of closure for the loss experienced at that site is finally felt.

== Relation to the Port Arthur Massacre ==
In Tom Holloway's "Foreword" to Beyond the Neck, he recounts where he was and what he was doing at the time of the Port Arthur Massacre, and the long-lasting effect on him is evident, "That first day will stay with me forever." Holloway's deep emotional attachment to the events of that day inspired him to write a play on it, especially because it was something that affected the entirety of Australia, "It was an event so tragic that people struggled even to talk about it. It was too big and too painful. For many, it still is. For me though it brought up things that I needed to share..." What made it even more difficult for Australia to cope and move on from the event was the media blackout on survivor's statements and testimonies during the trial of Martin Bryant. Due to this blackout, the Australian public was deprived of important information regarding the event and survivors were unable to tell their story, preventing healing. Therefore, the shock of Holloway's play was increased, as it broke the silence and began a remedial process for the survivors and the Australian public as a whole.

Although Holloway rejects the notion that his play adheres to the "verbatim" genre, its role in community healing reflects the positive therapeutic and restorative nature of verbatim theatre. It is for this reason that the play was included in the NSW HSC Drama Syllabus from 2015-2018.

Additionally, the way in which Holloway constructed the play, through interviews of those most affected, mirrors the process for creating verbatim theatre. Holloway noted the positive impact and healing properties that these interviews fostered, quoted by the ABC as saying, "For many people the moment when they were able to share the story was a major part of being able to come to terms with it. Some people could do that straight away, others took years. Some were prompted to share their experience after the events of September 11".

For Holloway, effect of his play upon the Tasmanian community and those affected in terms of healing was seriously considered, evident in his instruction in "Introduction to Port Arthur and the Play...": "Before each performance, the cast and crew should offer tea and biscuits or similar to the audience without charge. Not in the sense of an emergency centre, but purely to give something away for free."

== Adaptations ==
An early version of Holloway's Beyond the Neck was chosen by La Mama Café in the 2004 Melbourne International Arts Festival for further development, leading to its eventual premiere on 12 September 2007. Located at the Peacock Theatre in Hobart, with Ron Haddrick starring as Character 4, the play was performed for an additional three nights at that location. The play then toured to Launceston, where it was staged from 18 to 21 September at the Earl Arts Centre.

Belvoir St Theatre in Surry Hills was the next Australian company to stage the play, from 7 to 31 May and starring award-winning Australian actress Anita Hegh.

On 15 March 2012, the play was revived for a production in Melbourne by Red Stitch, a series of shows lasting until 14 April 2012 with Australian theatre veteran Roger Oakley performing as Character 4.

Most recently, Emu Productions/Epicentre Theatre Production Company produced Beyond the Neck at King Street Theatre from 28 May – 13 July 2015.

== Reception ==
In 2007, "Beyond the Neck” was one of only ten plays selected for stage reading by the Royal Court Theatre's International Young Playwright's Festival in London, out of over four hundred submissions. Adding to its numerous accolades, the play was also appointed as "best stage play" at the 2008 Australian Writer's Guild Awards.

The play has been positively critically received, with The Daily Telegraph reporting it to be "a powerful meditation on a national tragedy so brutal that many people are still coming to terms with it." For The Daily Telegraph, the play's musicality and chorus-like performance was both its triumph and its downfall, "Although the actors are still in the complicated process of finding the rhythm of this work and the script is occasionally uneven in tone, there are some genuinely moving moments".

Of its 2012 Belvoir St production, The Sydney Morning Herald acclaimed, "Beyond The Neck echoes in your head for a long time afterwards". Anita Hegh further adulated Holloway on his work in her interview with The Daily Telegraph on her involvement in the Belvoir St production, defining him to be "a very serious talent".

Alternatively, the Herald Sun rated its Red Stitch production a high 4.5 stars. The Sydney Morning Herald was equally favourable toward the Red Stitch production, claiming that, "Tom Holloway's Beyond the Neck composes the long shadow of the Port Arthur massacre into a beautifully graduated piece of chamber theatre", and that the play is "a haunting drama, and this nuanced ensemble production from Red Stitch allows its soft, broken chords to sing".
