= Volcano Man =

Documentary feature film

- Theatrical release poster
- Directed by: James Crawley
- Written by: James Crawley, Tim Russell, Steven Sander
- Produced by: Tim Russell; Rhian Skirving
- Starring: James Crawley
- Production company: Palace Cinemas
- Distributed by: Madman Entertainment
- Release date: August 5, 2022 (Melbourne International Film Festival)
- Running time: 86 minutes
- Country: Australia
- Language: English

Volcano Man is a 2022 Australian documentary film directed by James Crawley. It was written by James Crawley, Tim Russell and Steven Sander, and produced by Tim Russell and Rhian Skirving. It tells the story of James' father Richard Crawley, an eccentric photographer and documentarian.

The film premiered at the Melbourne International Film Festival on August 5, 2022, screening around Australia in 2022 through Palace Cinemas and released in Australia and New Zealand via Madman Films and DocPlay. It received critical acclaims from critics and audience. It received several awards including clinching the third in the Melbourne International Film Festival Audience Award in 2022, and the AWGIE Awards for the Best Writing in a Documentary Feature in 2023.

== Synopsis ==
Richard Crawley is a filmmaker who is passionate about his work. He records his family every moment. He ventures to music photography in order to pay the family bills. After he befell tragedy, his son James attempts to understand his father's turmoil after discovering 30 hours of confessional footage, thus begins a documentary about his father.

== Release ==
Volcano Man was premiered at the 70th Melbourne International Film Festival on August 5, 2022, emerging as third in the Audience Award. It was screened in partnership with Movember and Palace Cinemas in November 2022, before being released in Australia and New Zealand on DocPlay. In October 2023, the film had its international premiere at the Heartland International Film Festival.

== Reception ==
Volcano Man received positive reviews from critics and audience. It won in 2023, the AWGIE Awards for Best Writing in a Documentary Feature at the 56th ceremony, and the Best Editing in a Feature Documentary from the Australian Screen Editors Guild. It was nominated for Best Documentary Feature Film by the Film Critics Circle of Australia 2023 and for the Best Documentary Feature at the Heartland International Film Festival.

ABC Radio commended the film as among the "stand-out films, home-movie footage shaped into a remarkable documentary of family, love, grief and determination. The Guardian called the film, "A celebration of life".
