= Port Arthur massacre =

1996 mass shooting in Tasmania, Australia

- Port Arthur (Tasmania) Port Arthur (Australia)
- Location: 43.14652°S 147.85139°E; Port Arthur, Tasmania, Australia
- Date: 28–29 April 1996; 30 years ago 11:45 AM – 7:45 AM (UTC+10)
- Target: People at the Port Arthur Historic Site
- Attack type: Mass murder, mass shooting, shooting spree, carjacking, kidnapping, hostage-taking, arson
- Weapons: Colt AR-15 (.223); L1A1 Self-Loading Rifle (7.62x51mm); Daewoo Precision Industries USAS-12 (Unused; Left in car)
- Deaths: 35
- Injuries: 24 (including the perpetrator)
- Perpetrator: Martin Bryant
- Motive: Revenge; property dispute, notoriety (suspected)

The Port Arthur massacre was a mass shooting that occurred on 28 April 1996 at Port Arthur, a tourist town in the Australian state of Tasmania. The perpetrator, Martin Bryant, murdered 35 people and wounded 23 others, in the deadliest mass shooting by a lone gunman in modern Australian history. The attack led to fundamental changes in Australia's gun laws.

Two of Bryant's victims were known to him personally and were killed at Seascape, a bed and breakfast property. The majority of his victims were killed in a shooting spree at the Port Arthur Historic Site, a popular tourist destination. Using two semi-automatic rifles, he began his attack at a small café before moving into a nearby gift shop, killing 20 people indiscriminately in a short amount of time. Many others were killed at the site's car park, including several children. After killing its four occupants, Bryant stole a vehicle at the site's tollbooth and drove to a nearby service station, where he killed a woman and abducted her partner. He continued to fire at passing vehicles before finally returning to Seascape with his hostage, who was then killed. He set fire to the property but was captured the following morning.

Bryant pleaded guilty to the killings and received 35 life sentences without parole; his motives have been subject to debate. The massacre led to a reassessment of Australia's gun laws by the newly elected Howard government. The National Firearms Agreement between state and federal governments was announced within two weeks of the massacre, establishing heavy restrictions on the use of automatic and semi-automatic weapons and creating a gun buyback program, a national gun registry and a waiting period for firearm sales.

== Background ==
=== Location ===
The main location of the incident was the historic Port Arthur former prison colony, a popular tourist site in south-eastern Tasmania, Australia.

=== Perpetrator ===
In 1992, Martin Bryant—then 25—was bequeathed about $570,000 in property and assets by a friend, Helen Harvey, who left her estate to him following her death in a car crash. He used part of this money to go on many trips around the world from 1993 onwards.

Bryant's father had tried to purchase a bed and breakfast property called Seascape, but Noelene (also known as Sally) and David Martin bought this property before his father could ready his finances, much to the disappointment of Bryant's father, who often complained to his son of the "double dealing" the Martins had done to secure the purchase. Bryant's father offered to buy another property from the Martins at Palmers Lookout Road, but they declined the offer. Bryant apparently believed the Martins had deliberately bought the property to hurt his family and believed this event to be responsible for the depression that led to his father's 1993 suicide. Bryant later described the Martins as "very mean people" and as "the worse [sic] people in my life".

In late 1995, Bryant became suicidal after deciding he had "had enough". He stated, "I just felt more people were against me. When I tried to be friendly toward them, they just walked away". Although he had previously been little more than a social drinker, his alcohol consumption increased and, although he had not consumed any alcohol on the day of the massacre, his alcoholism had especially escalated in the six months prior.

According to Bryant, he thought the plan for Port Arthur might have first occurred to him four to twelve weeks before the event.

=== Motivation ===
Bryant's suspected motivations for the massacre were the refusal of the sale of Seascape by owners David and Noelene Martin and the desire to become notorious, as revealed by his lawyer, on the Channel 7 program Sunday Night, aired on 6 March 2016. From the moment he was captured, he continually wanted to know how many people he had killed and seemed impressed by the number. Bryant is allowed to listen only to music on a radio outside his cell and is denied access to any news reports of his massacre. Photographers who took pictures of him in his prison cell were forced to destroy the film in his presence when the Governor found out.

=== Gun laws in Australia before the Port Arthur massacre ===
After storming out of a national gun summit in 1987, eight years before the massacre and following two mass shootings in Melbourne earlier in the year, Premier of New South Wales Barrie Unsworth said: "it will take a massacre in Tasmania before we get gun reform in Australia", referencing Tasmania's resistance to gun law changes. A redesign of the laws for all states and territories of Australia had been prepared by officers and presented at a meeting of police ministers in Launceston in 1995. It had been rejected by Tasmania.

== Attacks ==
The events of the day were pieced together after investigation by police, then presented in court on 19 November 1996.

David and Noelene Martin were the first victims, murdered at the Seascape property (43.11905°S 147.85328°E) at some point within a 12 hour timeframe prior to the Port Arthur attack.

A couple stopped at Seascape, and Bryant met them outside. When they asked if they could have a look at the accommodation, Bryant told them that they could not because his parents were away and his girlfriend was inside. His demeanour was described as quite rude and the couple felt uneasy. They left at about 12:35 p.m.

Bryant drove to Port Arthur in his yellow Volvo 244, taking the keys for Seascape and the Martins' weapons stored in the Seascape properties after locking the doors. Bryant stopped at a car which had pulled over due to overheating and talked with two people there. He suggested that they come to the Port Arthur café for some coffee later.

He travelled past the Port Arthur historic site towards a Palmer's Lookout Road property owned by the Martins, where he came across Roger Larner. Larner had met him on some occasions more than 15 years previously. Bryant told Larner he had been surfing and had bought a property called Fogg Lodge and was now looking to buy some cattle from Larner. Bryant also made several comments about buying the Martins' place next door. He asked if Marian Larner was home and asked if he could continue down the driveway of the farm to see her. Larner said OK but told Bryant he would come also. "Bryant then responded that he might go to Nubeena first" and he was going to return in the afternoon.

=== Port Arthur Historic Site ===
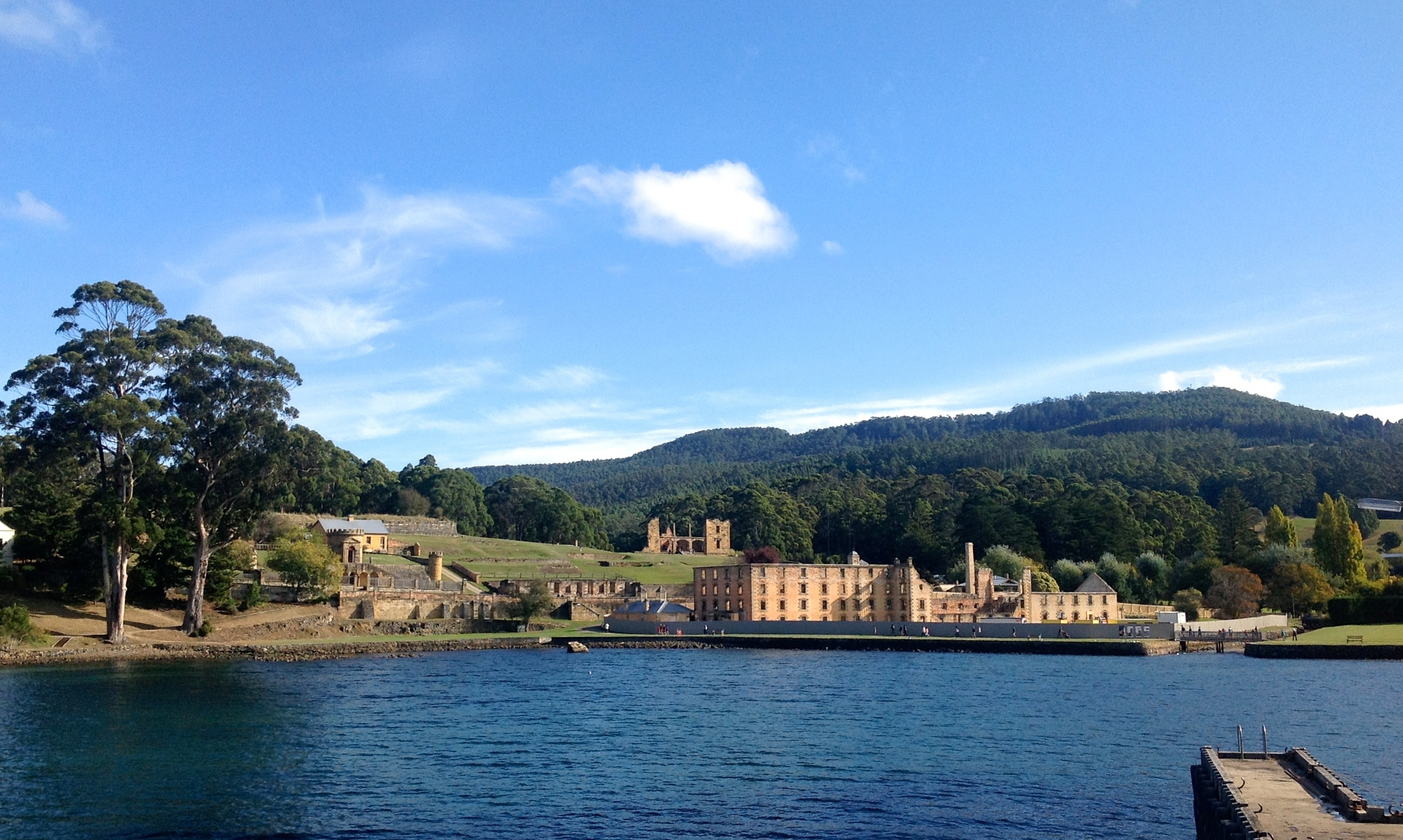
Port Arthur Bay, Port Arthur was the location of most of the shootings.

At around 1:10 p.m., Bryant paid the entry fee for the site and proceeded to park near the Broad Arrow Café (43.14652°S 147.85139°E), near the water's edge. The site security manager told him to park with the other cars because that area was reserved for camper-vans and the car park was busy that day. Bryant moved his car to another area and sat in his car for a few minutes. He then moved his car back near the water, outside the café. The security manager saw him go up to the café carrying a "sports-type bag" and a video camera, but ignored him. Bryant went into the café and purchased a meal, which he ate on the deck outside. He attempted to start conversations with people about the lack of wasps in the area and there not being as many Japanese tourists as usual. He appeared nervous and "quite regularly" looked back to the car park and into the café.

=== Broad Arrow Café murders ===
The café was very small, and was particularly busy that day as many people waited for the next ferry. Bryant pointed his rifle at the table beside him, fatally shooting Moh Yee (William) Ng and Sou Leng Chung, who were visiting from Malaysia. Bryant then fired a shot at Mick Sargent, grazing his scalp and knocking him to the floor. He then fatally shot Sargent's girlfriend, 21-year-old Kate Elizabeth Scott, hitting her in the back of the head.

A 28-year-old New Zealand winemaker, Jason Winter, had been helping the busy café staff. As Bryant turned towards Winter's wife Joanne and their 15-month-old son Mitchell, Winter threw a serving tray at Bryant in an attempt to distract him. Joanne Winter's father pushed his daughter and grandson to the floor and under the table.

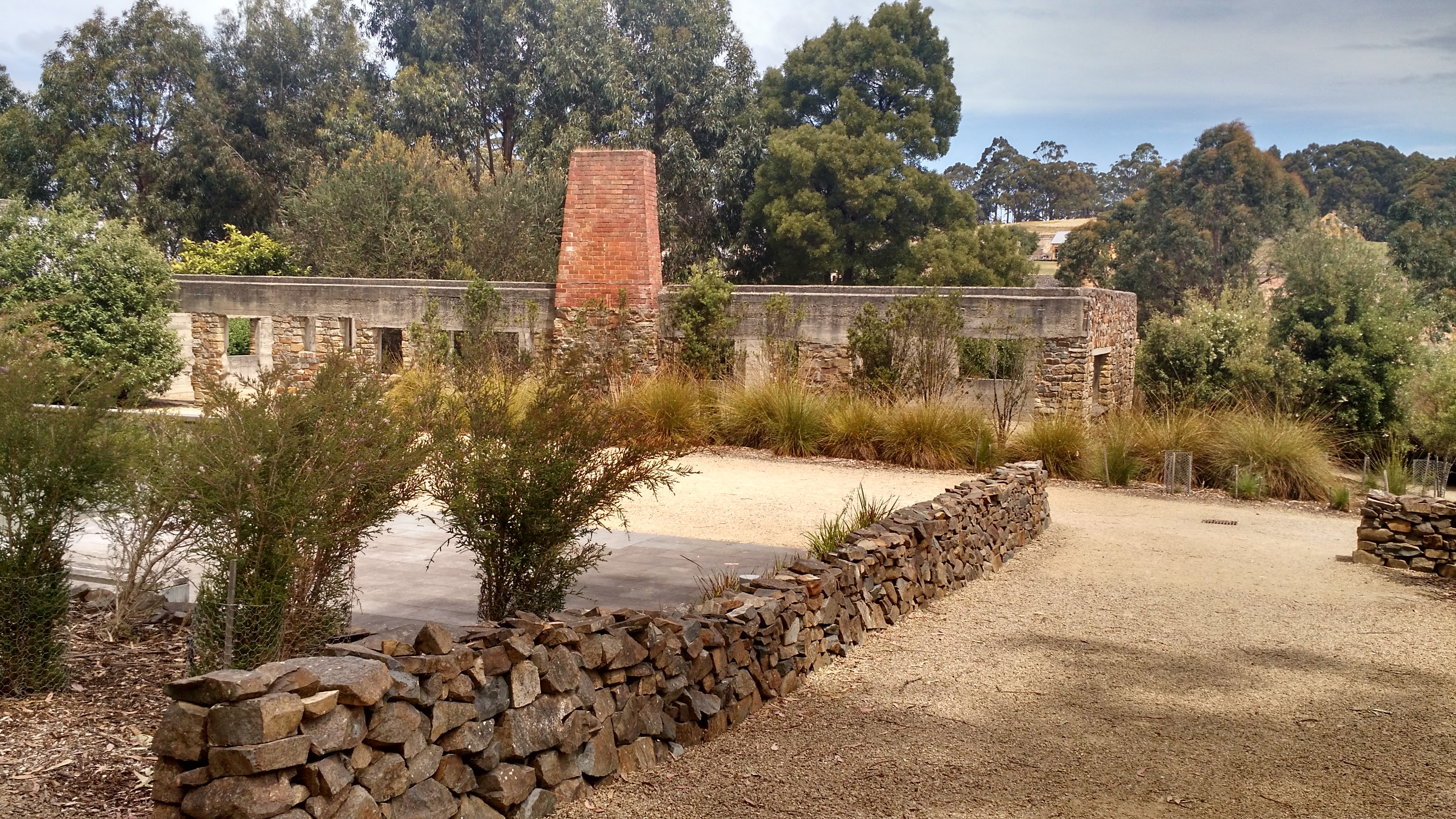
The cafe structure in 2015. A memorial garden has been established at the site.

Anthony Nightingale, 44, stood up after the sound of the first shots. Nightingale yelled "No, not here!" as Bryant pointed the weapon at him. As Nightingale leaned forward, he was fatally shot through the neck and spine.

Bryant fired one shot that killed Kevin Vincent Sharp, 68. He then fired another shot at Walter Bennett, 66, which passed through his body and struck Raymond John Sharp, 67, Kevin Sharp's brother, killing both. The three had their backs towards Bryant, and were unaware what was happening . The shots were all at close range. Gerald Broome, Gaye Fidler and her husband John Fidler were all struck by bullet fragments, but survived.

Bryant then turned towards Tony and Sarah Kistan and Andrew Mills. Tony Kistan and Andrew Mills had both stood up when the shooting began, and both were fatally shot in the back of the head, Kistan while pushing his wife towards the door. Thelma Walker and Pamela Law were injured by fragments from these shots before being dragged to the ground by their friend, Peter Crosswell, as the three sheltered underneath the table. Also injured by fragments from these shots was Patricia Barker.

Bryant moved just a few metres and began shooting at the table where Graham Colyer, Carolyn Loughton and her daughter Sarah were seated. Colyer was shot in the jaw. Sarah Loughton ran towards her mother, who had been moving between tables. Carolyn Loughton threw herself on top of her daughter. Bryant shot Carolyn Loughton in the back; her eardrum was ruptured by the muzzle blast from the gun going off beside her ear. Despite Carolyn's efforts, Sarah had been fatally shot in the head.

Bryant pivoted around and fatally shot Mervyn Howard. The bullet passed through him, through a window of the café, and hit a table on the outside balcony. Bryant then fatally shot Mervyn Howard's wife, Mary Howard in the head and neck.

Bryant was near the exit, preventing others from attempting to run past him and escape. Bryant moved across the café towards the gift shop area. As Bryant moved, Robert Elliott stood up. He was shot in the arm and head, though survived his injuries.

The shooting lasted approximately 15 seconds, during which Bryant fired 17 shots, killed 12 people, and wounded 10 more.

=== Gift shop murders ===
As Bryant moved towards the gift shop area, many used the time to hide under tables and behind shop displays. He fatally shot the two local women who worked in the gift shop: 17-year-old Nicole Burgess, in the head, and 26-year-old Elizabeth Howard, in the arm and chest.

Coralee Lever and Vera Jary hid behind a hessian (burlap) screen with others. Lever's husband Dennis was fatally shot in the head. Pauline Masters, Vera Jary's husband Ron, and Peter and Carolyn Nash had attempted to escape through a locked door but could not open it. Peter Nash laid down on top of his wife to hide her from the gunman. Gwen Neander, trying to make it to the door, was shot in the head and killed.

Bryant saw movement in the café and moved near the front door. He shot at a table and hit Peter Crosswell, who was hiding under it, in the buttock. Jason Winter, hiding in the gift shop, thought Bryant had left the building and made a comment about it to people near him before moving out into the open. Bryant saw him, with Winter exclaiming, "No, no" just prior to being shot, the bullet hitting his hand, neck and chest. Winter was then fatally shot in the head. Fragments from those shots struck American tourist Dennis Olson, who had been hiding with his wife Mary and Winter. Dennis Olson suffered fragment injuries to his hand, scalp, eye and chest, but survived.

It is not immediately clear what happened next, although at some point, Bryant reloaded his weapon. Bryant walked back to the café and then returned to the gift shop, where he fatally shot Ronald Jary, Peter Nash and Pauline Masters. He did not see Carolyn Nash, who was lying under her husband. Bryant aimed his gun at an unidentified Asian man, but the rifle's magazine was empty. Bryant then moved to the gift shop counter, where he reloaded his rifle, leaving an empty magazine on the service counter, and left the building.

In the café and gift shop combined, he fired 29 shots, killed 20 people, and wounded 12 more.

=== Car park murders ===
Bryant then moved towards the coach parking lot, situated in front of the café building. One of the coach drivers, Royce Thompson, was shot in the back as he was moving along the passengers' side of a coach. He fell to the ground and was able to crawl under the bus, but later died of his wounds. Brigid Cook was trying to guide people down between the buses and along the jetty area to cover. Bryant moved to the front of this bus and walked across to the next coach. People had quickly moved from this coach towards the back end, in an attempt to seek cover. As Bryant walked around it, he saw people trying to hide and shot at them. Cook was shot in the right thigh, causing the bone to fragment, the bullet lodging there.

Bryant then quickly moved around another coach and fired at another group of people. Winifred Aplin, running to get to cover behind another coach, was fatally shot in the side. Another bullet grazed Yvonne Lockley's cheek, but she was able to enter one of the coaches to hide, and survived.

Some people then started moving away from the car park towards the jetty. However, someone shouted that Bryant was heading that way, so they doubled back around the coaches to where Brigid Cook had been shot. Bryant then moved to where Janet and Neville Quin, who owned a wildlife park on the east coast of Tasmania, were beginning to move away from the buses. Bryant shot Janet Quin in the back, where she fell, unable to move, near Royce Thompson.

Bryant then continued along the car park as people tried to escape along the shore. Doug Hutchinson was attempting to get into a coach when he was shot in the arm.

Bryant then went to his vehicle, which was just past the coaches, and exchanged his weapon for a self-loading rifle.

Bryant moved back to the buses where Janet Quin lay injured from the earlier shot. He then fatally shot her in the back. Bryant then went onto one of the coaches and fatally shot Elva Gaylard in the arm and chest. At an adjacent coach, Gordon Francis saw what happened and moved down the aisle to try to shut the door of the coach he was on. He was seen by Bryant and shot from the opposite coach. He survived, but needed four major operations.

Neville Quin, husband of Janet, had escaped to the jetty area, but returned to look for his wife. He had been forced to leave her earlier after Bryant shot her. Bryant exited the coach and, spotting Quin, chased him around the coaches. Bryant fired at him at least twice before Quin ran onto a coach. Bryant entered the coach and pointed the gun at Neville Quin's face, saying, "No one gets away from me". Quin ducked when he realised Bryant was about to pull the trigger. The bullet missed his head but hit his neck, momentarily paralysing him.

=== Toll booth murders and carjacking ===
Bryant went to his car and drove towards the exit from the historical site. Ahead of him were Nanette Mikac and her children, Madeline, 3, and Alannah, 6. Nanette was carrying Madeline, and Alannah was running slightly ahead. By this point, they had run approximately 600 metres (660 yards) from the car park. Bryant opened his door and slowed down. Mikac moved towards the car, apparently thinking he was offering help. Bryant stepped out of the car, and told Nanette Mikac to get on her knees. She did so, and Bryant fatally shot her in the temple. He then fatally shot Madeline and Alannah.

Bryant drove up to the toll booth at the exit of the historical site, where there were several vehicles, and blocked a 1980 gold BMW 7 Series owned by Mary Rose Nixon. Inside were Nixon, driver Russell James Pollard and passengers Helene and Robert Graham Salzmann. An argument with Robert Salzmann ensued, and Bryant took out his rifle and fatally shot him. Pollard emerged from the BMW and moved towards Bryant before being fatally shot in the chest. Bryant then moved to the BMW and fatally shot Nixon and Helene Salzmann before removing them from the car. Bryant transferred ammunition, handcuffs, the AR-15 rifle and a fuel container to the BMW.

Another car then came towards the toll booth and Bryant shot at it.

=== Service station murder and abduction ===
Bryant drove up to the service station in front of the Port Arthur General Store (43.13983°S 147.85079°E) and cut off a white Toyota Corolla that was attempting to exit onto the highway. Glenn Pears was driving, with girlfriend Zoe Hall in the passenger seat. Bryant quickly exited the car with his rifle in hand and tried to pull Hall from the car. Pears got out of the car and approached Bryant. Bryant pointed the gun at Pears and pushed him backwards, eventually directing him into the now open boot of the BMW, locking Pears inside.

Bryant then moved back to the passenger side of the Corolla as Hall attempted to climb over to the driver's seat. Bryant raised his rifle and fired three shots, killing her.

=== Seascape roadway ===
As Bryant drove down to Seascape, he shot at a red Ford Falcon coming the other way, smashing its front windscreen. Upon arriving at Seascape, he got out of his car. A Holden Frontera 4WD vehicle then approached Seascape along the road. Those in the vehicle saw Bryant with his gun, but believed him to be rabbit hunting and slowed down as they passed him. Bryant fired into the car; the first bullet hit the bonnet and broke the throttle cable. He fired at least twice more into the car as it passed, breaking the windows. One bullet hit the driver, Linda White, in the arm.

Another vehicle then drove down the road, carrying four people. It was not until they were almost adjacent to Bryant that they realised he was carrying a gun. Bryant shot at the car, smashing the windscreen. Douglas Horner was wounded by pieces of the windscreen. The car proceeded ahead where White and Wanders tried to get in, but Horner did not realise the situation and drove on. When they saw that White had been shot, they came back and picked them up. Both parties then continued down to a local establishment called the Fox and Hounds Inn, where they called police.

Yet another car drove past and Bryant shot at it, hitting the passenger, Susan Williams, in the hand. The driver, Simon Williams, was struck by fragments. Sometime after he stopped, Bryant removed Pears from the boot and handcuffed him to a stair rail within the Seascape Guesthouse. At some point, he also set the BMW on fire. He would spend the next 18 hours in a standoff with police.

=== Capture on 29 April ===
Bryant was captured the following morning, when a fire started in the guest house, presumably set by Bryant.

It was discovered that Glenn Pears had been shot during or before the standoff and had died before the fire. The remains of the Martins were also found.

== Victims ==
=== Fatalities ===
The following is a list of those killed in the Port Arthur massacre.

- Winifred Joyce Aplin, 58
- Walter John Bennett, 66
- Nicole Louise Burgess, 17
- Sou Leng Chung, 32
- Elva Rhonda Gaylard, 48
- Zoe Anne Hall, 28
- Elizabeth Jayne Howard, 26
- Mary Elizabeth Howard, 57
- Mervyn John Howard, 55
- Ronald Noel Jary, 71
- Tony Vadivelu Kistan, 51
- Leslie Dennis Lever, 53
- Sarah Kate Loughton, 15
- David Martin, 72
- Noelene "Sally" Joyce Martin, 69
- Pauline Virjeana Masters, 49
- Alannah Louise Mikac, 6
- Madeline Grace Mikac, 3
- Nanette Patricia Mikac, 36
- Andrew Bruce Mills, 39
- Peter Brenton Nash, 32
- Gwenda Joan Neander, 67
- William Xeeng Ng, 48
- Anthony Nightingale, 44
- Mary Rose Nixon, 60
- Glenn Roy Pears, 35
- Russell James Pollard, 72
- Janette Kathleen Quin, 50
- Helene Maria Salzmann, 50
- Robert Graham Salzmann, 57
- Kate Elizabeth Scott, 21
- Kevin Vincent Sharp, 68
- Raymond John Sharp, 67
- Royce William Thompson, 59
- Jason Bernard Winter, 29

== Aftermath ==
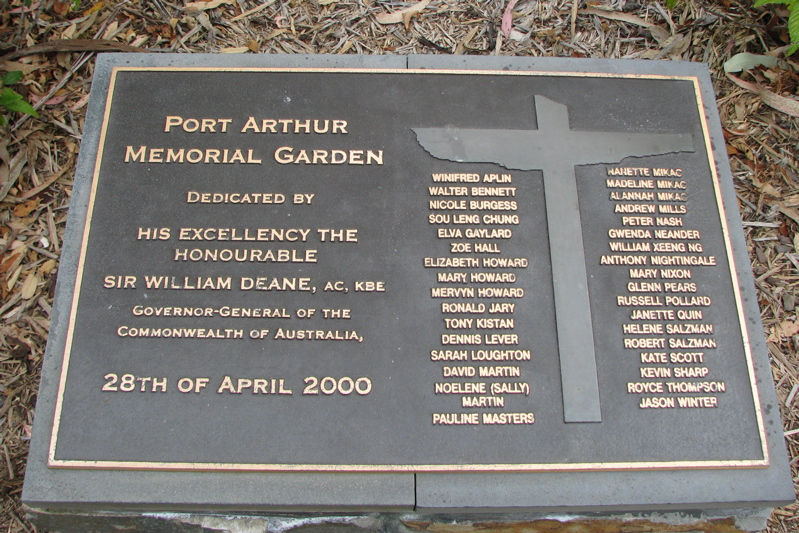
Memorial plaque

The Port Arthur tourist site reopened a few weeks later, and since then a new restaurant has been built. The former Broad Arrow Café structure is now a "place for quiet reflection", with a monument and memorial garden dedicated at the site in April 2000. The Australian Journal of Emergency Management published several research articles on the response and the ongoing processes of recovery, including an article about caring for the social workers working with residents.

=== Government reaction ===
Following the spree, the Prime Minister of Australia, John Howard, led the development of strict gun control laws within Australia and formulated the National Firearms Agreement, restricting the private ownership of semi-automatic rifles, semi-automatic shotguns and pump-action shotguns as well as introducing uniform firearms licensing. It was implemented with bipartisan support by the Commonwealth, states and territories. The massacre happened just six weeks after the Dunblane massacre, in Scotland, which claimed 18 lives, with UK Prime Minister John Major reaching out to his counterpart over the shared tragedies; the United Kingdom passed its own changes to gun laws the next year after a change of government.

Under federal government coordination, all states and territories of Australia restricted the legal ownership and use of self-loading rifles, self-loading shotguns, and tightened controls on their legal use by recreational shooters. The government initiated a mandatory "buy-back" scheme with the owners paid according to a table of valuations. Some 643,000 firearms were handed in at a cost of $350 million which was funded by a temporary increase in the Medicare levy which raised $500 million.

Some state governments, notably Tasmania itself and Queensland, were generally opposed to new gun laws. Concern was raised within the Coalition Government that fringe groups such as the "Ausi Freedom Scouts", the Australian League of Rights and the Citizen Initiated Referendum Party, were exploiting voter anger to gain support. After discovering that the Christian Coalition and National Rifle Association of America were supporting the gun lobby, the government and media cited their support, along with the moral outrage of the community to discredit the gun lobby as extremists.

=== Community reaction ===
A substantial community fund was given for the victims of the Port Arthur massacre. The murder of Nanette Mikac and her daughters Alannah and Madeline inspired Dr Phil West of Melbourne, who had two girls similar in age to the murdered children, to set up a foundation in their memory. The Alannah and Madeline Foundation was launched in 1997 to combat bullying and to support child victims of violence.

The massacre at Port Arthur forged a kinship between that town and the Scottish town of Dunblane, which had suffered a similar event, the Dunblane school massacre, only weeks previously.

In 1996, Australian composer Peter Sculthorpe wrote Port Arthur, In memoriam: for chamber orchestra, "...for the victims of the massacre at Port Arthur, 28 April 1996, for those who died, and for those who live with the memory of it". The work was first performed 24 June 1996, at Government House, Hobart, Tasmania, by the Tasmanian Symphony Orchestra conducted by David Porcelijn.

=== Mental illness and copycat effects ===
Much discussion has occurred as to Bryant's mental health. At the time of the offences he was in receipt of a Disability Support Pension on the basis of being mentally handicapped. Media reports also detailed his odd behaviour as a child. He was able to drive a car and obtain a gun, though he possessed a licence for neither.

Paul Mullen, a forensic psychiatrist with extensive involvement following the string of massacres in Australia and New Zealand, attributes both the Port Arthur massacre and some of the earlier massacres to the copycat effect. In this theory the saturation media coverage provides both instruction and perverse incentives for dysfunctional individuals to imitate previous crimes. In Tasmania, a coroner found that a report on the current affairs program A Current Affair, a few months earlier had guided one suicide, and might have helped create the expectation of a massacre. The coverage of the Dunblane massacre, in particular the attention on the perpetrator, is thought to have provided the trigger for Bryant to act.

== Investigation ==
Martin Bryant pleaded guilty to having carried out the shootings and was given 35 life sentences without parole. Since 2015, he has been imprisoned in the Risdon Prison Complex.

=== Prosecution ===
Bryant was held in Royal Hobart Hospital under heavy police guard while awaiting trial. According to a guard, there were at least two security guard job applications made by individuals seeking to exact retribution on Bryant.

On 22 November 1996, Bryant was sentenced to 35 sentences of life imprisonment for each count of murder and sentenced to 25 years for the remaining 36 charges on 5 other offences (20 attempted murders, 3 counts infliction of grievous bodily harm, the infliction of wounds upon a further 8 persons, 4 counts of aggravated assault and 1 count of unlawfully setting fire to property). All sentences are to be served concurrently.

== Legacy ==
Tasmanian Police records from the incident are in the care of the Tasmanian Archive and Heritage Office. A memorial service on the 20th anniversary of the massacre had over 500 people in attendance.

In 2007, Tasmanian playwright Tom Holloway dealt with the massacre in his play Beyond the Neck. Tasmanian composer Matthew Dewey also deals with these issues in his first symphony. The case was also covered by Casefile True Crime Podcast on 11 February 2017.

The 2019 album Tasmania by Australian psychedelic rock/pop band Pond contains a song that is partly about the massacre, titled "The Boys Are Killing Me".

The 2021 feature film Nitram is based on the event and won the 2021 CinefestOZ Film Prize.

== Conspiracy theories ==
Following the massacre, many pro-gun activists in Australia began promoting conspiracy theories about the massacre. The book Deadly Deception at Port Arthur, a pseudoscientific text written by Joe Vialls in 1999, is often cited by conspiracy theorists, as is the 2016 film Bryant – The Port Arthur Massacre by actor Paul Moder, though neither of these are credible sources.

One of the most popular conspiracy theories regarding the attacks involves the idea that the attacks were carried out by the government to strengthen gun laws, or that the government had prior knowledge of the attacks, claims that have been openly promoted by several members and candidates of right-wing populist parties such as One Nation and the Shooters, Fishers and Farmers Party (SFF). Often referenced cited as supposed evidence for this conspiracy theory is a quote from then-New South Wales Premier Barrie Unsworth where he famously declared in 1987 that it would take a mass shooting in Tasmania to change Australia's gun laws, with the quote being referenced by One Nation and founder leader Pauline Hanson herself, despite Hanson denying she believed in conspiracy theories about the event.

== See also ==
- List of mass shootings in Australia
- List of massacres in Australia
- Timeline of major crimes in Australia
- List of disasters in Australia by death toll
