= Murder of Michiko Okuyama =

Australian murder case

Michiko Okuyama
- Born: 1974 or 1975; Yokohama, Japan
- Died: 20 September 1997 (aged 22); Cairns, Queensland, Australia
- Cause of death: Homicide

Michiko Okuyama (born 1974 or 1975) was a Japanese woman whose body was discovered on 4 October 1997 after disappearing from Cairns, Queensland, Australia on 20 September 1997. On 7 October 1997, a 16-year-old boy was detained by police during a raid on a Cairns City property and he appeared in the Cairns Children's Court the following day charged with Okuyama's murder. He was convicted by a jury of murder on 23 September 1998 and was subsequently sentenced to life imprisonment, becoming the first minor in Queensland to receive such a sentence.

Due to his age at the time of the murder, a child having been born on 7 January 1981, the killer's name can never be publicly disclosed under Queensland law.

== Background ==
While growing up in Yokohama, Okuyama developed an interest in the ocean hoping to visit the Great Barrier Reef. She worked as a swimming instructor after finishing school and also obtained her Master Scuba Diver certification. In 1997, she successfully applied for a 12-month work visa enabling her to travel to Australia to work on becoming a fully qualified divemaster. Her inability to speak much English was not a deterrent to her aspiration of moving to Australia and working on the Great Barrier Reef.

== Arrival in Australia ==
Okuyama arrived in the Far North Queensland city of Cairns on 14 September 1997, the location consciously chosen by Okuyama due to its marketing as a thriving tourism centre as well as its close proximity to the reef. She moved into an apartment her parents had rented for her in the city centre, where she began sharing with a roommate. Okuyama spoke to her parents on the phone on 19 September 1997 to update them on how she was settling in. She said she was happy with her clean apartment and described her roommate as friendly.

== Disappearance ==
At around 11:30am on 20 September 1997, Okuyama left her apartment informing her roommate that she planned to do some shopping. Casually dressed and wearing a bum bag, Okuyama caught a bus and then disembarked near the Cairns Post Office to post some letters to friends and family in Japan. She then purchased some items at a Woolworths to prepare that night's evening meal.

When Okuyama did not arrive back at the apartment, her roommate grew concerned but assumed Okuyama had made other plans. However, after more time had elapsed, Okuyama's roommate contacted Okuyama's parents who were also concerned. They reported her missing to the police in Cairns on the evening of 22 September 1997.

Okuyama's parents, Mikio and Toshie Okuyama arrived in Cairns on 25 September 1997. Communicating through an interpreter, the Okuyama family were updated by the Queensland Police Service on the case and their efforts in locating their daughter. This had included extensively searching throughout the city, releasing her image and details in the local media, putting up posters and dressing a mannequin to look like Okuyama in a shopping centre.

== Discovery ==
On 5 October 1997, Okuyama's naked body was found in a swamp at the rear of a home in the suburb of Manunda by a resident returning from a holiday. He had discovered Okuyama's remains after going to investigate an unpleasant odour. Her badly decomposed body had been covered in palm fronds and soil. Dental records were used to confirm the body belonged to Okuyama. A post-mortem examination revealed Okuyama had been severely beaten and had sustained multiple facial fractures. The official cause of death was determined to be blood inhalation and her death was ruled as a murder. Due to the advanced state of decomposition, it was unable to be determined whether Okuyama had been raped.

== Arrest, trial and conviction ==
During a raid on a Cairns City property on 7 October 1997, a 16-year-old boy was arrested.

The boy appeared in the Cairns Children's Court on 8 October 1997 on a single count of murder, where he was not required to enter a plea. He was remanded in custody until a committal hearing on 19 December 1997.

It was reported in the media that the boy had left school at the age of 14 and was estranged from his family. He had been living in a caravan and had recently failed to obtain work as a television camera operator's assistant at the local Network 10 station. It was reported that he had contacted the television station to pitch a local news story about street safety.

On the day of Okuyama's disappearance, he had his photograph published in the Cairns Post in an unrelated article after having approached the newspaper about having found seven used syringes in the street. That photograph was republished by The Sun-Herald on 12 October 1997 after his appearance in the children's court.

Under Queensland law, the boy's identification was suppressed due to the age he was when he murdered Okuyama - which continues to be the case with his identity not being revealed until after his death. In official court documents, the boy has only ever been referred to as "D".

An eight-day trial commenced in the Queensland Supreme Court, during which the court heard evidence from the prosecution that the boy had lured Okuyama into the disused Elphinstone Ltd building in Grafton Street and trapped her in a soundproof vault where he held her captive and viciously attacked her, bashing her head against a wall, and then leaving her to die.

After leaving her body in the vault for several days, the boy returned to the building and placed her body in a wheelie bin, and then dragged her remains through the streets in broad daylight until dumping them in the swamp near Trinity Bay State High School in Manunda where they were eventually found.

When police raided the warehouse, they found Okuyama's blood inside the vault and the groceries she had purchased at the supermarket in an upstairs room. They also found trophies in the boy's caravan, including Okuyama's blood stained clothing and her bum bag.

A jury took just 50 minutes to deliberate on 23 September 1998, finding the boy guilty of Okuyama's murder.

When Justice Stanley Jones handed down his sentence on 8 November 1998, the killer became the first minor in Queensland to ever be sentenced to life imprisonment. Jones said the murder was violent and particularly "heinous and macabre", meeting the two preconditions for a life sentence to be imposed on a minor.

The boy's appeal against the severity of his sentence in 1999 were unsuccessful. His lawyer argued that the killing was not particularly ruthless and a reduction to approximately 15 years in prison would be more appropriate given the boy's young age. The three appeal court judges upheld the original life sentence that had been imposed, due to the brutal nature of the killing.

On turning 17, he had been transferred from juvenile detention to an adult prison. He was subject to the maximum 15-year non-parole period under the Juvenile Justice Act. He applied for parole in 2013 from the Woodford Correctional Centre.

After enquiries made by the media in 2018, it's now asserted that the killer finished his sentence in October 2017 and is again living in the community.

Following his conviction, the boy's father gave an interview to the Cairns Post.

The father, who also cannot be named, said he would feel obligated to apologise to the Okuyama family if he was certain his son had committed the murder. However, he felt he was unable to because he sincerely believed his son wasn't capable of murdering someone. He stated: "If I knew for a fact that it was my son who actually killed the young woman I would feel obliged to apologise to her family. Such an act is just not in his make-up. Even prior to him being sentenced, my son again told me he did not do it... I cannot apologise for something I don't know to be factual and has been based to a large degree on circumstantial evidence... Until I am convinced that my son committed the murder, I will continue to stand by him."

According to the boy's father, his son and 20-year-old daughter had come to Cairns to live with him approximately four years prior to the murder. Their mother was based on the Sunshine Coast. The father admitted that his two children were from an "unhappy and broken marriage" in which he struggled with alcoholism. The boy's father said he had been separated from his wife since 1991.

== Legacy ==
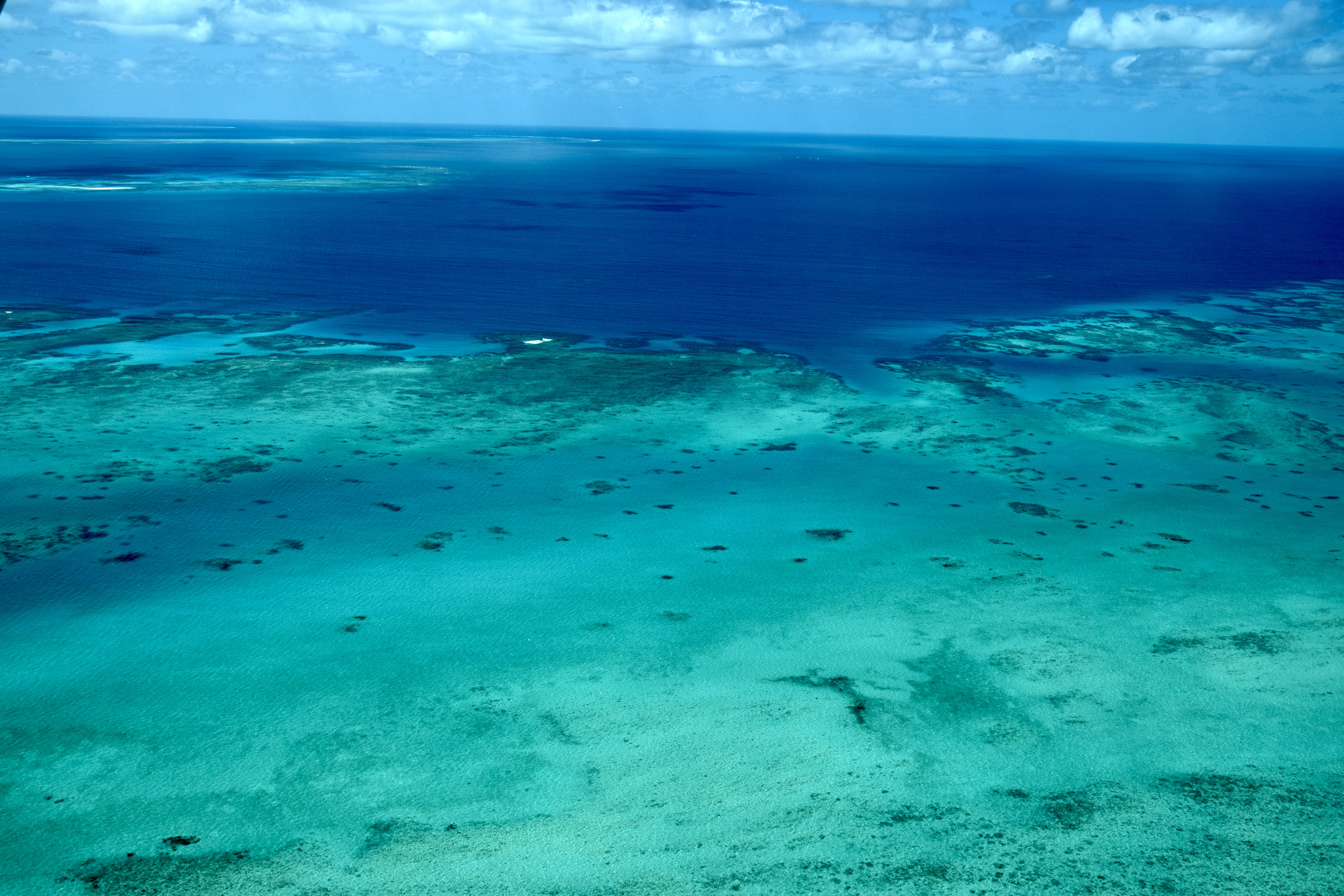
A 2016 photo of the Great Barrier Reef near Cairns, where Michiko Okuyama's ashes were scattered

Okuyama's body was privately cremated in Cairns with her family scattering some of her ashes on the Great Barrier Reef before they took the remaining ashes back to Japan.

Upon leaving Cairns, Okuyama's family were comforted for more than an hour at the Cairns Airport by locals and airport staff who apologised for their daughter's murder. Through an interpreter, Okuyama's mother Toshie told the gathering that the family did not blame the city for their daughter's murder, and thanked them for their help.

Despite support shown by the Cairns community, Okuyama's murder prompted scrutiny into how Asian tourists were being treated in Cairns. According to criminologist Paul Wilson there was evidence of harassment against Asians in Cairns which was also a city which had an issue with violence at local pubs.

Cairns-based journalist and author Robert Reid said the time had come to openly address the issues relating to crime in Cairns including assaults against tourists. Reid expressed frustration about being labelled "anti-Cairns" or part of the detested southern media whenever attempts were made to raise the issue. He also observed that there had been a different approach surrounding Okuyama's murder, stating: "Local crimes, particularly assaults on Japanese tourists, have been played down for a long time. Yet for this murder, 15 detectives flew up from Brisbane, a police media spokesman was up here for a week, interpreters were hired, journalists came from Japan by the planeful and even the Federal Minister for Tourism came up. The case made headlines everywhere. It is because she was Japanese. Cairns is billed as paradise but it can be hell if you are not careful, especially at night."

In 1998, on the first anniversary of Okuyama's murder, a memorial garden was erected by the Cairns community, Cairns City Council and the local Japanese community. It was dedicated in Okuyama's honour.

Voluntary caretakers John and Luiza Grave have maintained the memorial since it was erected. They have had ongoing issues relating to keeping the area free from litter, having continuously removed dirty nappies, condoms, syringes, cigarette butts and human excrement from the garden. In 2021, the Graves expressed concerns about who would maintain the memorial when they were no longer able to, particularly after John Grave was diagnosed with osteoarthritis.

== International tourism concerns ==
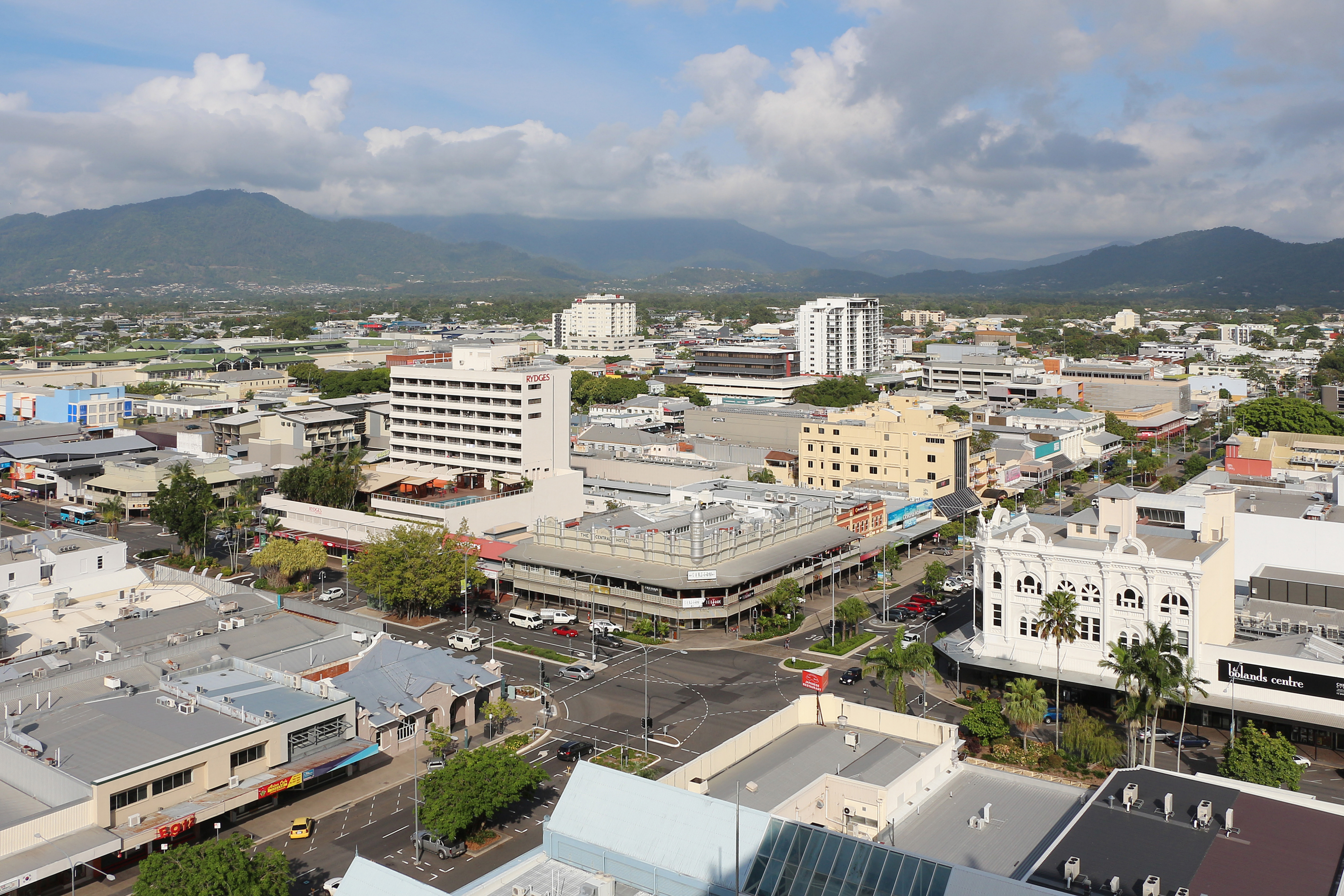
Cairns, 2015

Okuyama's murder was covered extensively in the Japanese media, which became hostile towards Australia.

Concerned about the damage the coverage was doing to Australia's image as a tourist destination, Federal Tourism minister Andrew Thomson visited Cairns on 7 October where a large Japanese media contingent had assembled. Thomson gave interviews to the Japanese journalists while speaking in their language urging them not to over-react.

Despite this, the media in Japan portrayed Australia as an increasingly violent and racist country. Some magazines linked Okuyama's murder with the views of federal politician Pauline Hanson who had risen to prominence following her maiden speech in the Australian parliament in which she criticised Asian immigration and said Australia was in danger of becoming "swamped" by Asians.

The Sankei newspaper claimed that there is an ongoing issue with "yobbos" in Cairns who are frequently harassing young Japanese women. The newspaper quoted a Japanese resident who local men in Cairns had boasted about Japanese women being easy targets because they were compliant and easily led. The newspaper also claimed the murder had created a "deep unease" within Australia's Japanese community.

Shūkan Josei published an article suggesting Cairns was not a safe place for women while Shūkan Gendai published an article critiquing the way Okuyama was dressed at the time of her disappearance. Yomiuri Shimbun reported on Australia's worsening crime statistics.

Okuyama's brother Hideo Okuyama complained about swarmed by Japanese media at the Narita International Airport in Tokyo after returning from identifying his sister's body. He also became frustrated with the way Australia was being portrayed by the Japanese media which prompted him to create a website in an attempt to provide an accurate depiction of what had occurred. Writing on his webpage, Hideo said "I don't want anybody to misunderstand Cairns or Australia. I fear lots of people might misunderstand and give up going to such a wonderful place. It's full of warm-hearted people. But the media, they never give up. We felt much calmer and quieter in Cairns and I felt keenly the warmth and respect of the people of Cairns. The family also complained of Okuyama being portrayed by the Japanese media as a flirtatious woman who courted danger.

In response to the negative publicity, Australia launched a tourism campaign costing more than $1 million to promote safety.
