= Murder of Yvonne Gilford =

1996 murder case in Saudi Arabia

Yvonne Gilford
- Born: c.1941 Australia
- Died: 12 December 1996; Dhahran, Saudi Arabia
- Cause of death: Asphyxiated with a pillow
- Occupation: Nurse
- Known for: Murder victim
- Family: Frank Gilford (brother)

Yvonne Gilford was an Australian nurse who was murdered in the King Fahd Military Medical Complex, in Dhahran, Saudi Arabia on 12 December 1996. Two British nurses, Deborah Parry and Lucille "Lucy" McLauchlan, were arrested for the crime. Parry confessed to the murder and McLauchlan to being an accessory, though both subsequently claimed to have been coerced into signing the confession. Parry was sentenced to death by beheading, and McLauchlan to eight years' imprisonment and 500 lashes. Parry's sentence was reduced to life imprisonment after Gilford's elder brother Frank accepted a "blood money" payment of approximately £750,000, and both sentences were eventually commuted to time served after personal intervention from King Fahd.

== Yvonne Gilford ==
Yvonne Gilford was born in 1941 and grew up on a farm in Jamestown, South Australia, along with her parents and brother Frank. She became a nurse at the age of 28 and initially worked in Auckland, New Zealand, before moving to London, United Kingdom in 1973 and then Johannesburg, South Africa in 1976. After working in various hospitals in the city for the next twenty years, she accepted a new job in Dhahran in April 1996, and moved to Saudi Arabia with her ultimate aim being to earn enough money to retire from nursing and return to Australia. She initially found herself with few colleagues who spoke good English and quickly befriended Parry and McLauchlan after they arrived in Dhahran in August of that year. For Parry it was her second time working in the country as she had previously worked there between 1993 and 1994, while it was McLauchlan's first time working abroad. She had been dismissed from her previous job for credit card fraud. It subsequently emerged she had used fraudulent references to obtain the job in Dhahran.

== Murder ==
Gilford was last seen alive on the evening of 11 December, when she, Parry and McLauchlan held an "early Christmas party" in her bedroom. She failed to report for work the following morning, and when guards were sent to her bedroom to investigate, they found her dead. There were signs of a struggle in which Gilford had been stabbed thirteen times, though the ultimate cause of her death was ascertained to have been asphyxiation by her own bed pillow. Within the next week, Parry and McLauchlan were arrested on suspicion of murder after allegedly using Gilford's bank card to make a series of withdrawals totalling approximately $1,000.

== Trial and sentencing ==
Several days after their arrest, Parry eventually confessed to having been in a relationship with Gilford, and that she had attacked her (albeit without intent to kill) following an argument. McLauchlan agreed that her account of events was true, though by the time of the trial both had unsuccessfully attempted to withdraw the confession, claiming that they had been intimidated, deprived of sleep and subjected to threats of sexual violence in order to coerce them into signing it. Prior to the trial, the lawyers for the two nurses discovered similarities between Gilford's death and the 1994 murder of Liberty de Guzman, another nurse at the same complex, but that case was judged to not be relevant to the trial.

The actual trial was relatively swift, in large part due to the confession that the two nurses had signed. There was no cross-examination of the two witnesses, nor any witnesses or forensic evidence. McLauchlan was found guilty of manslaughter and was sentenced to eight years' imprisonment and 500 lashes. Parry's sentencing was more complicated, as she was found guilty of murder and sentenced to death, but could be commuted to a life sentence if the closest surviving relative of the victim were to accept a "blood money" payment as allowed under the Islamic law of Diyya. Gilford's closest surviving relative was her brother Frank, who initially refused the notion of accepting any such payment, though eventually accepted a payment worth around £750,000, which was funded primarily by British Aerospace and philanthropist/publisher Felix Dennis. Frank subsequently donated the entire payment to a children's charity.

While Parry had been saved from the death penalty, there were still many questions about the overall fairness of the trial, and in March 1998, Prime Minister Tony Blair personally appealed to King Fahd during a state visit to resolve the situation. Finally, on 20 May 1998, Fahd commuted the sentences of both women to 17 months in prison – the time that they had already served – with the only conditions being that both were to write him a letter personally thanking him for his clemency, and then accept deportation back to the United Kingdom.

== Aftermath ==
Following her return to the UK, McLauchlan married her fiancé Grant Ferrie. She subsequently asked to meet Frank to personally apologise for calling him a "greedy, selfish bastard" for accepting the blood money, but Frank refused the offer and said that he did not ever want to meet either of the two nurses. She was subsequently struck off the nursing register for her actions in using false references to obtain her job in Saudi Arabia. In 2011 she was convicted of credit card fraud for a second time, before being convicted of theft in May 2012. On both occasions, her solicitor said she had been "mentally scarred" by her experience in the Saudi prison. McLauchlan died on 7 January 2014, aged 48, at Ninewells Hospital, Dundee, Scotland after suffering a brain haemorrhage at her house two days previously.

Parry resumed her nursing career upon her return to the UK, being re-employed at one of her former jobs at Holy Cross Hospital in Haslemere, despite an attempt by MP George Galloway to have her struck off. She continued to maintain that she was not a lesbian and had not been in a relationship with Yvonne Gilford and had no involvement whatsoever with the murder, and in 2012 called for Gilford's body to be exhumed and subjected to forensic techniques that were not available at the time of her death.

The case attracted much attention in the UK and Australia owing to the fact it would have been the first execution of a westerner in Saudi Arabia. Other factors were the British media's reporting over the case and the political pressures that prompted Fahd to release the nurses. The case was mentioned in Desert Royal, a memoir of a Saudi princess written by Jean Sasson.
