= Red Stitch Actors Theatre =

Australian ensemble theatre company

- Interactive map of Red Stitch Actors Theatre
- Address: 2 Chapel Street; St Kilda East, Victoria
- Coordinates: 37.85837°S 144.99315°E
- Capacity: 80

Website
- redstitch.net

Red Stitch Actors Theatre is an ensemble theatre company based in Melbourne, Australia.

Established in 2001 and with its first season in 2002, Red Stitch has presented over 100 contemporary plays. These include works from international playwrights such as Edward Albee, Annie Baker, Jez Butterworth, Martin Crimp, Amy Herzog, Sarah Kane, Neil LaBute and Simon Stephens, and more recently Australian playwrights such as Melissa Bubnic, Tom Holloway and Joanna Murray-Smith.

Red Stitch's 80-seat theatre is a converted church hall on Chapel Street, St Kilda East opposite the Astor Theatre. The company was based in an industrial building on Inkerman Street, St Kilda, until 2003. Red Stitch occasionally plays seasons at Arts Centre Melbourne's Fairfax Studio and tours to other cities across Australia. Its 2023 production of Who's Afraid of Virginia Woolf transferred to Melbourne's Comedy Theatre in June 2024, and to Sydney's Roslyn Packer Theatre in November 2025.

In 2019, Red Stitch revamped the Cromwell Road Theatre in South Yarra as a flexible space seating up to 120, to be a second venue for the company.

Red Stitch has won numerous Melbourne Green Room Awards, including Best Production - Theatre Companies for Harvest by Richard Bean in 2007 and Iphigenia in Splott by Gary Owen in 2022. Its production of Red Sky Morning by Tom Holloway was nominated for the national Helpmann Award for Best Regional Touring Production in 2011.
