= Murder of Jane Thurgood-Dove =

1997 murder in Australia

Jane Thurgood-Dove
- Born: Jane Elisa Magill; 17 March 1963; Australia
- Died: 6 November 1997 (aged 34); Niddrie, Victoria, Australia
- Cause of death: Murder
- Body discovered: Muriel Street, Niddrie, Victoria, Australia
- Resting place: Fawkner Memorial Park, Fawkner, Moreland City, Victoria, Australia
- Known for: Murder victim
- Spouse: Mark Thurgood-Dove
- Children: 3
- Parent(s): Helen and John Magill

Jane Elisa Thurgood-Dove was the victim of a murder in Niddrie, Victoria, Australia in 1997. On 6 November 1997, she was confronted in the driveway of her suburban Melbourne home and shot repeatedly as her three young children, aged 3, 5 and 10, cowered inside her car.

The murder shocked the public. Despite the Victorian government posting a $1 million reward for information leading to a conviction, no one has been charged in relation to this murder.

== Murder ==
Jane Thurgood-Dove arrived at her Muriel Street, Niddrie, home in the afternoon of 6 November after collecting her children from school. As she climbed from her 4WD, she was approached by a "short, pot-bellied man" who proceeded to chase her around the vehicle. When she tripped and fell, the man then pulled out a large calibre pistol and, in full view of her terrified children, shot her repeatedly in her head and torso, killing her instantly.

The man ran to a waiting getaway car, a stolen metallic blue Holden Commodore, driven by a younger, slimmer man. The assailants sped off. The car was later found torched in nearby Farrell Street. Investigations revealed that the Holden Commodore was stolen the previous day from Princes Park, Carlton.

== Suspects ==
Following the murder, police initially followed two distinct lines of investigation with the prime investigator, Ron Iddles, suspecting either the husband of Thurgood-Dove or a man Iddles discovered was having an affair with Thurgood-Dove.

=== Husband ===
The police first considered the husband of Thurgood-Dove. However, police investigations tended to support his assertions that his marriage was happy and healthy.

=== Obsessed man ===
Thurgood-Dove had revealed to at least two friends that a well-respected, serving policeman was obsessed with her and, indeed, had been diagnosed with depression since her murder. In 1998, Melbourne's Herald Sun carried the front-page headline that the policeman was the prime suspect in Thurgood-Dove's murder. He is believed to have admitted loving her and asking her to leave her husband, but denied killing her.

It was speculated that the policeman hired two hitmen to kill Thurgood-Dove when she refused to leave her husband. The policeman was interviewed by the Homicide squad on three occasions. The policeman had no alibi for the time of Thurgood-Dove's killing and, indeed, failed a polygraph test on 29 April 2000. However, police could not uncover sufficient evidence to charge the man.

Some police were concerned that the suspect in the case was still an operational policeman and armed. The policeman, who worked in the city, was believed to have daily dealings with the public and routinely carried a revolver in the course of his duty. Some police had sought his removal from operational duties. But police command was believed to have refused to suspend or transfer the man after he produced medical and psychiatric evidence that he was fit to continue active duty.

On 7 October 2003, the Herald Sun quoted a senior homicide detective eliminating the policeman, who was the prime suspect in the Thurgood-Dove murder, from further inquiries.

=== Mistaken identity ===
Following the announcement of a $1 million reward, police received information that a group of Geelong bikers had been implicated in the murder. It was said that Thurgood-Dove was mistakenly murdered, with the real target being a woman of similar appearance with a 4WD who lived, like her, on a corner property in the same street. Police offered a potential indemnity deal to a former biker suspected of being the getaway driver in return for identifying the person who organised the hit. Two men, Steven John Mordy and Jamie Reynolds, were named as the persons responsible for stealing the vehicle and committing the murder. Mordy died in 2000 from a heart attack, and Reynolds died in a boating accident in 2006, meaning the case is unlikely to ever be solved.

== See also ==
- List of unsolved murders (1980–1999)
