= And No More Shall We Part =

2009 play written by Tom Holloway

- Author: Tom Holloway
- Language: English
- Genre: Play
- Publisher: Currency Press
- Publication date: 2009
- Publication place: Australia
- Media type: Print (Paperback)
- ISBN: 978-0-86819-904-7

And No More Shall We Part is a 2008 play by the Australian playwright Tom Holloway.

== Plot ==
The play is about Pam and Don; after a long and successful marriage, they are still very much in love. But Pam is ill and has to make a heartbreaking decision that will transform both their lives. She does so in the only way she knows how – quickly, pragmatically, and resolutely. Don behaves in the only way he knows how – struggling to keep up but desperate not to lose touch.

And No More Shall We Part follows Pam and Don’s halting, humorous and devastating attempt to begin to say goodbye to each other after a lifetime together.

== First production ==
And No More Shall We Part was first produced by A Bit Of Argy Bargy and Full Tilt for the Melbourne Fringe Festival at BlackBox Theatre, The Arts Centre, Melbourne, on 30 September 2009, with the following cast:

Pam: Margaret Mills

Don: Dennis Moore

Director: Martin White

Designer: Katie Skillington

Lighting Designers: Adam Hardy and Kimberly Anne Kwa

Production Manager: Erica McCalman

== Awards ==
- 2008 Patrick White Playwrights' Award, commended
- 2010 AWGIE Awards, winner
- 2010 Victorian Premier's Prize for Drama, winner
