= Tom Holloway =

Australian playwright

Tom Holloway is an Australian playwright and librettist, based in Melbourne. He is a four-time AWGIE Award winner. His plays have been performed across Australia and internationally, including productions in the United Kingdom, Germany, France and the United States.

== Early life and education ==
Holloway was born in Tasmania and grew up in Hobart. After attending university in Tasmania, he studied playwriting at Sydney's National Institute of Dramatic Art in 2001, and at London's Royal Court Theatre International Playwriting Studio in 2006.

== Career ==
=== Early plays (2007–2012) ===
Holloway's plays have been performed across Australia and internationally, including Beyond the Neck at Belvoir St Theatre (2007), Red Sky Morning at Red Stitch Actors Theatre (2008–09) and on a regional tour, and Don't Say The Words (2009). And No More Shall We Part was performed by Griffin Theatre Company, Sydney, and at Hampstead Theatre, London (2012). In February 2011, his play Fatherland premiered at the Gate Theatre in London.

=== Storm Boy, Forget Me Not and international work (2013–2019) ===
His stage adaptation of Colin Thiele's Storm Boy premiered in 2013 (Barking Gecko Theatre Company and Sydney Theatre Company), returning for a national tour in 2015, and was staged by Melbourne Theatre Company in 2019. Forget Me Not premiered at Belvoir in 2013 and was later produced at London's Bush Theatre and the HighTide Festival in 2015. In 2016, And No More Shall We Part received its United States premiere at the Williamstown Theatre Festival, starring Alfred Molina and Jane Kaczmarek, and his solo play As We Forgive, written for actor Robert Jarman, was produced by Tasmania Performs and Griffin Theatre Company. His adaptation of James M. Cain's Double Indemnity premiered at Melbourne Theatre Company in 2016, and Sunshine was staged at Red Stitch Actors Theatre.

=== Opera ===
Holloway has collaborated with Czech composer Miroslav Srnka on four operas, produced by the Bavarian State Opera, the Bregenz Festival and Theater an der Wien. His libretto for South Pole premiered at the Bavarian State Opera in 2016, and a production of their chamber opera Make No Noise was presented at the Bregenz Festival that year. Their opera Singularity also premiered at the Bavarian State Opera. Their opera Voice Killer, based on the case of American soldier Eddie Leonski, who murdered three women in Melbourne in 1942, premiered at MusikTheater an der Wien on 13 June 2025.

=== Museum of Modern Love (2021–2022) ===
Holloway adapted Heather Rose's Stella Prize-winning novel The Museum of Modern Love for the stage. After development readings at Sydney Festival in 2021, the play premiered at the Seymour Centre as part of Sydney Festival in January 2022, directed by Timothy Jones.

=== Recent work (2024–present) ===
In March–April 2026, Beyond the Neck was presented at Theatre Works, St Kilda. Later in 2026, a UK and Ireland tour of Double Indemnity by Trafalgar Theatre Productions, starring Mischa Barton in her UK stage debut, was scheduled to open at Eastbourne's Devonshire Park Theatre in February.

Holloway's play Eliza, commissioned by Sydney Theatre Company and developed through Melbourne Theatre Company's NEXT STAGE Writers' Program, had its world premiere at MTC's Southbank Theatre (The Sumner) from 28 September to 31 October 2026, directed by Paige Rattray and starring Dan Spielman. Based on real events, it tells the story of MIT professor Joseph Weizenbaum and the creation of the ELIZA chatbot.

Alongside his playwriting, Holloway has developed workshops that teach storytelling and creative process to young people.

== Plays ==
- Stones In My Passkey (2001)
- Revelator (2002)
- The Bus (2004)
- Pathetique And the Papers (2004)
- Snapshot (2005)
- His Tattooed Fist (2005)
- Beyond the Neck (2007)
- The Knife that Catches the Sun (2008)
- Don't Say the Words (2008)
- Red Sky Morning (2008)
- Love Me Tender (2010)
- Gambling (2010)
- You Won't Be Seeing Rainbows Anymore (2010)
- The Suicide Show (2010)
- Fatherland (2011)
- Die Winterreise (2011)
- And No More Shall We Part (2011)
- If I Should Stay I Would Only Be in Your Way (2011)
- Faces Look Ugly (2011)
- Dance of Death (2013)
- Forget Me Not (2013)
- Storm Boy (2013)
- 100 Reasons for War (2015)
- Dead Centre and Sea Wall (2015)
- As We Forgive (2016)
- Double Indemnity (2016)
- Sunshine (2016)
- The Museum of Modern Love (2022)
- Eliza (2026)

== Libretti ==
- Make No Noise (music by Miroslav Srnka, 2011)
- South Pole (music by Miroslav Srnka, 2016)
- Singularity (music by Miroslav Srnka)
- Voice Killer (music by Miroslav Srnka, 2025)

== Style ==
Holloway has likened aspects of his work to postdramatic theatre. On Love Me Tender, he said: "There's been a big push away from story the last ten years in this movement called 'post-dramatic theatre'. They're very fragmented and experimental, these plays... I'm taking what I love about those plays and feeding narrative back into it."

== Awards ==
- 2008 AWGIE Award for Best Stage Play: Beyond the Neck
- 2008 Green Room Award for Best New Play and R. E. Ross Trust Script Award: Red Sky Morning
- 2010 AWGIE Award for Best Stage Play: And No More Shall We Part
- 2010 Victorian Premier's Literary Awards Louis Esson Prize for Drama: And No More Shall We Part
- 2011 Max Afford Award: Faces Look Ugly
- 2014 AWGIE Award for Theatre for Young Audiences: Storm Boy; also nominated for a 2014 Helpmann Award for Best Presentation for Children
- 2024 AWGIE Award for Stage – Adapted: The Museum of Modern Love (56th AWGIE Awards)

He was also shortlisted for the 2011 AWGIE, the 2009 NSW Premier's Literary Award, the 2011 WA Premier's Literary Award and the 2008 and 2009 Patrick White Awards.
