= Stanley Jones (judge) =

Australian judge

Stanley Graham Jones AO (born 10 September 1941 in Mackay, Queensland) is a retired Australian judge. He served as a judge of the Supreme Court of Queensland and became the court's first Far North Queensland judge. He was the first person to be appointed to the role of chancellor at Central Queensland University.

== Career ==
After attending Gladstone State High School and Nudgee College, Jones studied at the University of Queensland where he graduated with a Bachelor of Laws in 1964. Following his graduation, Jones was admitted to the Supreme Court of Queensland as a solicitor and worked as a partner at Brisbane firm, O'Sullivan, Curry & Co. In 1969, Jones was admitted to the Supreme Court of Queensland as a barrister and commenced practice in Rockhampton. During his time in Rockhampton, Jones became the founding chairperson of the local Aboriginal Legal Service in 1972. Jones became a Queen's Counsel in 1989.

Jones was the first person to be appointed to the role of chancellor at Central Queensland University in 1992. Jones had previously been a council member at the institution from 1975 until 1989, during its previous incarnation as the Capricornia Institute of Education. He resigned as the university's chancellor in 2004.

In 1997, Jones was appointed as a judge of the Supreme Court of Queensland and became the court's first Far North Queensland judge, based in Cairns.

Stanley Jones retired in 2011. His retirement drew tributes from various community leaders and the legal fraternity. Jones has remained active in legal affairs since his retirement, most notably chairing the Queensland Government's Youth Sexual Violence and Abuse Steering Committee.

== Awards ==
As part of the Queen's Birthday Honours list in 2005, Jones was appointed an Officer of the Order of Australia for improving legal and education services in Central Queensland.

Central Queensland University conferred Jones as a Doctor of the University in 2008. Jones received an Honorary Doctor of Laws from James Cook University in 2010.

== Personal life ==
In 2010, Jones was engaged by the Crime and Misconduct Commission to investigate claims of official misconduct by LNG companies relating to the completion of environmental assessments for coal seam gas projects.
