= A86 (software) =

Assembler and debugger for MS-DOS

- Developer: Eric Isaacson
- Stable release: 4.05 / 14 January 2000
- Operating system: MS-DOS
- Platform: x86
- Type: Assembler
- License: Freeware
- Website: eji.com/a86

A86 is an assembler for MS-DOS which generates 16-bit code for the Intel x86 family of microprocessors. Written by Eric Isaacson, it was distributed as shareware in June 1986. Isaacson was one of two people who implemented Intel's official ASM86 assembler released in 1982.

The A86 assembler is contained in one 32K executable and can directly produce a COM file or an object file for use with a standard linker. It comes with a debugger, D86. Speed of assembly is a primary selling point, and Isaacson claimed that A86 could assemble 100,000 lines of source per second on a Pentium II or better. 32-bit support was added in the mid 1990s in the form of A386 and D386. These were not distributed as shareware, but were provided to users who registered A86.

While supporting expected x86 syntax, A86 and A386 do not require directives, such as ASSUME, SEGMENT, and PROC, which Microsoft Macro Assembler and other contemporaries rely on. A86 and A386 have a custom syntax for macros and local labels which is incompatible with other assemblers. There are also a variety of syntactical tweaks allowing more concise source code.

The A86 family of products was never ported to Windows, but it is possible to use the object files created by A386 with a Windows linker. The assembler does not support 64-bit code.

== A86-specific features ==
If there are errors during assembly, the error messages are inserted directly into the source code so they can be found via text editor searches. The messages are automatically removed if they no longer apply. This behavior can be turned off via a command line option.

Any label consisting of one letter followed by one or more digits is local, meaning it can be redefined as needed, with each definition replacing the prior. The manual recommends using L1 through L9 for normal code and M1 through M9 in macros. Branches to local labels are assumed to be backward, but a forward branch can be specified by prefixing the label reference with the greater than symbol (e.g.,>L2).

Numbers starting with a zero are hexadecimal, such as 00FF, instead of using a prefix such as "0x" or "$". A trailing "K" indicates kibibytes. 16K is the same as 16*1024 or 16384.

Multiple registers can be pushed or popped on the same source line. push eax, edx, ebp generates one instruction for each of the three operands.

There is shorthand for conditionally executing a single instruction. if z mov ax,bx outputs two instructions: a conditional branch followed by the move.

If ret is specified as the label for a conditional branch, it automatically targets a return instruction within the 8-bit branch range (e.g., jz ret).

Macros use a different syntax than contemporaneous assemblers.

== Code fingerprint ==
The assembler was designed to use particular instruction encodings which are functionally equivalent, but together create a fingerprint that's embedded in the executable file. This is mentioned in the legal terms section of the manual. The fingerprint makes it possible to tell if code was assembled with A86 and also to distinguish between registered and unregistered versions of the assembler.
