= Familicide =

Act of killing one's own family

A familicide is a type of murder or murder–suicide in which an individual kills multiple of their own close family members (children, spouses, siblings, or parents) in quick succession. In half the cases, the killer lastly kills themselves in a murder–suicide. If only the parents are killed, the case may also be referred to as a parricide. An individual who commits familicide is called a familicider.

== Familicide of others ==
Familicide carried out by outsiders is used as a form of enhanced kin punishment or to eliminate rivals. In ancient China, the "nine familial exterminations" was the killing of an entire extended family or clan, usually for treason. Machiavelli advocated the extermination of a previous ruler's family to prevent uprisings in The Prince. Sippenhaft (English: kin liability) was used in Nazi Germany to punish and sometimes execute the relatives of defectors and anyone involved in the 20 July plot. La Cosa Nostra began killing the relatives, including women and more recently children, of informants (pentiti) and rivals in the 1980s.

== Family annihilators ==
=== Definition and statistics ===
Family annihilators are a specific type of familicide perpetrator. Forensic psychiatrist Park Elliott Dietz first introduced the term in 1986. He characterized family annihilators as typically the senior male of the household who is struggling with mental health issues and who kills each family member present, sometimes including pets. After murdering the others, he may commit suicide or force law enforcement to kill him.

Between 1900 and 1999, there were 909 mass murder incidents in the U.S. (defined as four victims within a 24-hour period). Of those, more than half occurred within an immediate family. Although the familicide cases are relatively rare, they are the most common form of mass killings. However, statistical data are difficult to establish due to reporting discrepancies.

Familicide differs from other forms of mass murder in that the murderer kills family members or loved ones rather than strangers. This has a different psychodynamic and psychiatric significance, but the distinction is not always made.

A study of 30 cases in Ohio found that most of the killings were motivated by a parent's desire to stop their children's suffering. According to ABC News contributor and former FBI agent Brad Garrett, people responsible for killing their families tend to be males in their 30s. Many of these crimes occur in August, before school starts, which may delay detection and investigation.

In Australia, a study was done of seven cases of familicide followed by suicide in which marital separation followed by custody and access disputes were identified as an issue. Some common factors such as marital discord, unhappiness, domestic violence, sexual abuse, threats of harm to self or others were found in varying degrees. It was not clear what could be done in terms of prevention.

Birmingham City University researchers Elizabeth Yardley, David Wilson, and Adam Lynes co-authored "A taxonomy of male British family annihilators, 1980–2013", examining British familicides in the period. Newspaper articles were used as references. The study concluded that most of the perpetrators were male. Men who murder their entire families usually do so because they believe their spouse performed a wrongdoing and that the spouse needs to be punished, they feel that the family members caused a disappointment, they feel that their own financial failings ruined the point of having a family, and because they wish to save their family from a perceived threat.

Far fewer women commit familicide, and those who do usually have different reasons, including perceived or imagined loss of custody of children. Male family annihilators are typically driven by loss of control, including financial crises, separation or divorce, and may demonstrate evidence for domestic violence, while for women perpetrators, battery, abuse or mental illness is more common, the act itself more likely premeditated and more likely to include victims under the age of one.

A literature review done in 2018 noted contextual and offense characteristics of familicide. Among the 63 articles reviewed 74–85% noted relationship problems or separation. This article also found evidence of financial problems, intoxication, and use of firearms. This literature review unveiled that 71% of these offenses were motivated in regard to conflict between parents and 29% associated to the perpetrators' situation in life. Lastly this article reported two studies, one of which found that many of the motives involved feelings of abandonment, psychosis, and narcissistic rage. The other study found that 60% of these perpetrators were suicidal and 40% homicidal.

=== Narrative ===
Yardley, Wilson, and Lynes divide familicides into four groups: anomic, disappointed, self-righteous, and paranoid.

In this typology, the "anomic" killer sees his family purely as a status symbol; when his economic status collapses, he sees them as surplus to requirements. The "disappointed" killer seeks to punish the family for not living up to his ideals of family life. The "self-righteous" killer destroys the family to exact revenge upon the mother, in an act that he blames on her. Finally, the "paranoid" killer kills their family in what they imagine to be an attempt to protect them from something even worse.

== Notable familicides ==
- Walter Calverley, April 23, 1605, Calverley Old Hall, Yorkshire, England. Calverley stabbed his sons William and Walter to death and also stabbed his wife. He was executed by pressing.
- George Forster, December 5, 1802, London, England. Forster allegedly killed his wife and child by drowning them in the Paddington Canal.
- Juhani Aataminpoika, October 18, 1849, Heinola, Finland. Aataminpoika killed his mother, stepfather and their two children, who were his siblings.
- Leah Charlton, May 8, 1890, Liverpool, England. Charlton, who had an unidentified mental illness, slit her three children's throats before attempting suicide.
- Frederick Bailey Deeming, July 26, 1891, Rainhill, Lancashire, England. Deeming killed his wife and four children and fled to Australia.
- Marty Bergen, January 19, 1900, North Brookfield, Massachusetts. Bergen killed his wife and two children with an axe, then slit his own throat.
- James Reid Baxter, April 8, 1908, Invercargill, New Zealand. Baxter killed his wife and five children, then himself.
- André Bloch, November 17, 1917, France. Bloch killed his brother, uncle and aunt for eugenic reasons.
- Mateo Banks, April 18, 1922, Azul, Buenos Aires, Argentina. Banks shot dead three siblings, two nieces, one sister-in-law and two family employees.
- Charles Lawson, December 25, 1929, North Carolina. Lawson killed six children and his wife with a 12-gauge shotgun, bludgeoned the bodies to make sure they were dead, and then walked into the woods and shot himself.
- Magda Goebbels and her husband Joseph, May 1, 1945, Berlin, Germany. The Goebbels fatally poisoned their six children before committing suicide together.
- John Etter Clark, June 3, 1956, Erskine, Alberta. Clark, a provincial politician at the time, used a rifle to kill five members of his family: his wife, son and three daughters. Also among the dead were a visitor and a hired farmworker.
- Lowell Lee Andrews, November 28, 1958, Wolcott, Kansas. Andrews shot his parents and sister.
- Troy axe murders, September 28, 1964. William G. Gravlin, a fireman who had recently exited a state hospital after slashing a cousin's wife, murdered his wife, daughter, and five stepchildren with an axe.
- Alice Crimmins, July 14, 1965, New York City. Crimmins killed her two children with help from persons unknown.
- Charles Whitman, August 1, 1966, Austin, Texas. Whitman killed his wife and mother before committing the University of Texas tower shooting, killing an additional 15 people and wounding 31 others.
- Jeffrey MacDonald, February 17, 1970, Fort Bragg, North Carolina. MacDonald killed his pregnant wife and two preschool-aged daughters.
- John List, November 9, 1971, Westfield, New Jersey. List killed his wife, mother, and three children.
- Ronald DeFeo Jr., November 13, 1974, Amityville, Long Island, New York. DeFeo killed his father, mother, two brothers, and two sisters.
- James Ruppert, March 30, 1975, Hamilton, Ohio. Ruppert killed 11 family members.
- Bradford Bishop, March 1, 1976, Bethesda, Maryland. Bishop allegedly killed his mother, wife, and three sons.
- Simon Peter Nelson, January 7, 1978, Rockford, Illinois. Nelson killed his six children, the family dog, and then assaulted his wife, before being arrested.
- George Emil Banks, September 25, 1982, Wilkes-Barre, Pennsylvania. Banks killed 13 people, including 5 of his children, their mothers, and bystanders. This still remains the deadliest mass shooting in Pennsylvania.
- White House Farm murders, August 7, 1985, Tolleshunt D'Arcy, England. Jeremy Bamber shot his parents, his foster sister, and her two children.
- Frances Newton, April 7, 1987, Mount Houston, Texas. Newton shot her husband and two children.
- Ronald Gene Simmons, December 22–26, 1987, Dover, Arkansas. Simmons killed 14 family members ranging in age from 20 months to 46 years.
- David Brom, February 18, 1988, Rochester, Minnesota. Brom, 16, murdered his parents, Bernard and Paulette, his younger brother, Richard, and sister, Diane, with an axe inside the family home.
- József Istvan Barsi, July 25, 1988, Canoga Park, California. Barsi killed his wife and daughter Judith before committing suicide two days later.
- Murder of the DeLisle children, August 3, 1989, Wyandotte, Michigan. Lawrence DeLisle drove the family station wagon into the Detroit River, drowning his four children. He and his wife both survived.
- Lyle and Erik Menendez, August 20, 1989, Beverly Hills, California. The two brothers murdered their parents, José and Mary Louise "Kitty" Menendez.
- Schlaepfer family murders, May 20, 1992, Paerata, New Zealand. Brian Schlaepfer, who had suffered from mild depression, murdered six members of his family on their Paerata farm before killing himself.
- Ricardo Barreda, November 15, 1992, La Plata, Argentina. Barreda killed his wife, Gladys McDonald, 57, mother-in-law, Elena Arreche, 86, and two daughters, Cecilia, 26, and Adriana, 24.
- Jean-Claude Romand, January 9–10, 1993, Prévessin-Moëns, France. Romand killed his wife, two children, his parents and their dog, and attempted to kill his ex-mistress.
- Zakrzewski family murders, June 9, 1994, Okaloosa County, Florida. Edward J. Zakrzewski II, a United States Air Force sergeant, murdered his South Korean wife and their two children by fatally striking them with a crowbar and machete. Zakrzewski was sentenced to death for the triple murder.
- Bain family murders, June 20, 1994, Dunedin, Otago, New Zealand. Five members of the Bain family were shot to death, either by Robin Bain, the father of the family, or the eldest son David, who was the sole surviving member of the family. David was convicted on five counts of murder in 1995, but was acquitted in a retrial in 2009.
- Susan Smith, October 25, 1994, Union, South Carolina. Smith drowned her two sons in a lake and blamed it on an imaginary Black hijacker.
- Freeman family murders, February 26, 1995, Salisbury Township, Lehigh County, Pennsylvania. Two brothers and their cousin murdered the brothers' parents and younger brother.
- Darlie Routier, June 6, 1996, Rowlett, Texas. Routier stabbed two of her sons to death before staging the scene as a home invasion.
- Christina Marie Riggs, November 4, 1997, Sherwood, Arkansas. Riggs smothered both her children before attempting suicide.
- Kip Kinkel, May 20, 1998, Springfield, Oregon. Kinkel killed his parents before committing a school shooting at Thurston High School the following day, leaving an additional two dead and 25 wounded.
- Khoua Her, September 3, 1998, Saint Paul, Minnesota. Her, strangled all six of children to death before attempting to commit suicide.
- Vladimir Pokhilko, September 21, 1998, Palo Alto, California. Pokhilko bludgeoned and stabbed his wife and son to death before committing suicide by slitting his own throat.
- Seth Privacky murdered his family (his mother, father, brother, brother's girlfriend, and grandfather) on Thanksgiving weekend, on November 29, 1998, fearing eviction from his parents.
- 1999 Atlanta day trading firm shootings, July 27, 1999, Stockbridge, Georgia. Mark Orrin Barton bludgeoned his wife, son, and daughter to death before going on a shooting rampage at day trading places before killing himself.
- Phillip Austin, July 10, 2000, Northampton, England. Austin murdered his wife, two children, and the family's two dogs.
- Lundy murders, August 29, 2000, Palmerston North, New Zealand. Mark Lundy murdered his wife and daughter.
- Robert William Fisher, April 10, 2001, Scottsdale, Arizona. Fisher has been charged with three counts of first-degree murder of his wife and two children and one count of arson. He is currently a fugitive from justice.
- Dipendra Bir Bikram Shah, June 1, 2001, Kathmandu, Nepal. Dipendra allegedly killed the royal family of Nepal at a family dinner and died from a self-inflicted gunshot to the head.
- Andrea Yates, June 20, 2001, Clear Lake City, Texas. Yates killed her five children, aged between six months and seven years.
- Sef Gonzales, July 10, 2001, Sydney, New South Wales. Gonzales killed his parents and sister with a knife and baseball bat before attempting to frame it as an anti-Filipino hate crime.
- Bluestone family murders, August 28, 2001, Gravesend, Kent, England. PC Karl Bluestone killed his wife and two of their four children before committing suicide.
- Christian Longo, December 18, 2001, Lincoln County, Oregon. Longo killed his wife and three children.
- Vincent Brothers, July 6, 2003, Bakersfield, California. Brothers shot his wife, their three children, and his mother-in-law.
- Marcus Wesson, March 12, 2004, Fresno, California. Wesson killed nine of his children that he fathered through his legal wife and his polygamist wives who were also his daughters and nieces.
- Christopher Porco, November 15, 2004, Delmar, New York. Porco murdered his father Peter and severely disfigured his mother Joan in an attempt to cover up his financial problems and exploitation of his parents (see Murder of Peter Porco).
- Neil Entwistle, January 20, 2006, Hopkinton, Massachusetts. Entwistle killed his wife and infant daughter.
- Richardson family murders, April 23, 2006, then twelve-year-old Jasmine Richardson murdered her eight-year-old brother Jacob, mother Debra, and father Mark, along with her then 23-year-old boyfriend Jeremy Steinke. Jasmine was responsible for her brother's death, while Steike was responsible for both her parents' death.
- Christopher Vaughn, June 14, 2007, Springfield, Illinois. Vaughn murdered his wife and three children and tried to frame his murdered wife for the crime.
- Chris Benoit, June 22–24, 2007, Fayetteville, Georgia. Benoit killed his wife and son before later taking his own life.
- Manling Williams, August 7-8, 2007, Rowland Heights, California. Manling murdered her husband and two sons because she wanted to have a new life with her affair partner. She is sentenced to death for her crime.
- Nicholas Waggoner Browning, February 1, 2008, Cockeysvile, Maryland. Nicholas killed his parents and his two younger brothers with a gun.
- Jessie Dotson, March 2, 2008, Binghampton, Memphis. Killed his brother, two of his nephews (also wounding two more nephews and his niece), their mother, and two others.
- Steven Sueppel, March 23, 2008, Iowa City, Iowa. Sueppel killed his wife, their four children, and himself.
- John Walsh, June 29, 2008, Cowra, New South Wales, Australia. Walsh killed his wife, two grandchildren and attempted to kill his daughter and noted his intention to kill his former son-in-law.
- Christopher Foster, August 26, 2008, Maesbrook, Shropshire, England. Foster killed his wife, daughter, horses, and dogs in his luxury home with a rifle before setting the house on fire, dying himself.
- William Parente, April 19–20, 2009, Towson, Maryland. Parente killed his wife, two daughters, and himself.
- Schenecker double homicide, January 27, 2011, Tampa, Florida. Julie Schenecker murdered her two children while her husband, a U.S. Army officer, was deployed to Iraq.
- Dupont de Ligonnès murders and disappearance, April 2011, Nantes, Loire-Atlantique, France. The wife and four children of Xavier Dupont de Ligonnès were found murdered and buried at the family home. Xavier, the only suspect, disappeared and has never been found.
- Rzeszowski family homicides, August 14, 2011, St Helier, Jersey. Damian Rzeszowski stabbed to death his wife, his two small children, his father-in-law, his neighbor, and the neighbor's child. Sentenced to 30 years in prison, died in custody on March 31, 2018.
- Powell murders, December 6, 2009, West Valley City, Utah, and February 5, 2012, South Hill, Washington. Joshua Powell murdered his sons Charles and Braden by bludgeoning them and setting fire to the house he was renting in February 2012. He is also believed to have murdered his wife Susan in December 2009. Powell died by suicide at the scene after killing his sons.
- Trey Eric Sesler, March 20, 2012, Waller, Texas. Sesler murdered his mother, father and brother with a shotgun and a rifle in preparation to perpetrate a school shooting at Waller High School. He was arrested at a friend's house the same day.
- Don Steenkamp, April 6, 2012, Griekwastad, South Africa. Steenkamp raped his sister and killed her and his parents.
- Harok family murder, 22 May 2013, U.S. national Kevin Dahlgren killed his cousin Veronika Haroková, her husband and two sons in Brno, Czech Republic.
- Timothy Jones Jr., August 28, 2014, Lexington County, South Carolina. Jones strangled his five children to death and drove their corpses round the highway for days before disposing of them in Alabama.
- Cairns child killings, December 18–19, 2014, Cairns, Australia. Raina Mersane Ina Thaiday (AKA Mersane Warria) was alleged to have drugged and stabbed seven of her children and one of their cousins before attempting to kill herself. She was found not guilty by reason of insanity.
- Van Breda murders, January 27, 2015, Stellenbosch, Western Cape, South Africa. Henri Christo van Breda murdered his parents and brother and severely wounded his sister.
- Broken Arrow killings, July 22, 2015, Broken Arrow, Oklahoma. Brothers Robert and Michael Bever murdered five family members; father, mother and three younger siblings, by stabbing them to death. Two survived the attack, one unharmed. Robert and Michael were each charged with five consecutive counts of first-degree murder.
- 2016 Spalding shooting, July 19, 2016, Lincolnshire, United Kingdom. Lance Hart killed his wife and daughter before killing himself.
- Hawe family murders, August 28, 2016, Ballyjamesduff, Ireland. Alan Hawe killed his wife, Clodagh, and their 3 sons Liam, Niall and Ryan before killing himself. A deputy principal, he feared losing his status. The case provoked a major conversation in Ireland about the marginalisation of Clodagh in reports on the crime.
- Woodlands double murders, January 20, 2017, Woodlands, Singapore. Teo Ghim Heng, 49, a Singaporean property agent who killed his pregnant wife, Choong Pei Shan, 39, and their daughter, Zi Ning, and was sentenced to death.
- Troadec family murders, February 16, 2017, Orvault, France. Hubert Caouissin murdered his brother-in-law, his wife and their two children in an inheritance dispute.
- Riverview murders, March 18, 2018, Riverview, Florida. Ronnie O'Neal III shot the mother of his children, hacked his daughter to death, and stabbed his son, who survived.
- Hart family murders, March 26, 2018, Mendocino County, California. Jennifer and Sarah Hart deliberately drove off a cliff with their six adopted children out of fear that they would be found out as abusive parents.
- Steven Pladl triple murder and suicide, April 11–12, 2018, Knightdale, North Carolina, and New Milford, Connecticut. Steven Pladl, 43, murdered his biological daughter, 20-year-old Katie Rose Fusco Pladl, whom he had been engaged in an incestuous relationship with, and her adoptive father, 56-year-old Anthony Charles Fusco, in New Milford, Connecticut. He later died by suicide in Dover, New York. He had killed his month-old son Bennett the day prior at his home in Knightdale.
- Osmington shooting, May 11, 2018, Osmington, Western Australia. Peter Miles murdered his wife, daughter, and his four grandchildren before killing himself.
- Watts family murders, August 13, 2018, Frederick, Colorado. Christopher "Chris" Watts, 33, killed his pregnant wife, Shanann, 34, and their two daughters, Bella, 4, and Celeste, 3.
- Anthony Robert Harvey, September 3, 2018, Bedford, Western Australia. Harvey killed his wife, three infant daughters and then his mother in law the next morning in their family home.
- Grant Amato, January 24, 2019, Seminole County, Florida. Amato killed his father, mother and brother, over his obsession with a cam girl.
- Todt family murders, December 2019, Celebration, Florida. Anthony Todt confessed to the murders of his wife, 42-year-old Megan, their three children: Alek, age 13; Tyler, age 11; and Zoe, age 4, and the family dog, Breezy.
- Clarke family murders, February 19, 2020, Camp Hill, Queensland, Australia. Rowan Baxter, 42, set fire to the interior of his enstranged wife's car, killing their three children, Aaliyah, 6, Laianah, 4, and Trey, 3, before killing himself. His estranged wife, Hannah, 31, would die later that day from her injuries.
- 2020 Williamsburg massacre, on December 8, 2020, Williamsburg, West Virginia, Oreanna Myers, 25, shot her three biological children and her two stepchildren before setting the house on fire, before killing herself. It is the worst mass shooting in West Virginia history.
- Murdaugh family murders, June 7, 2021, Islandton, South Carolina, Richard Alexander "Alex" Murdaugh, a prominent attorney, killed his wife Margaret "Maggie" Murdaugh and youngest son Paul Murdaugh at their hunting estate. Motives included financial issues, his addiction to Oxycontin, and impending civil and criminal judicial proceedings involving his son's role in the death of Mallory Beach.
- Samarate massacre, May 4, 2022, Samarate, Varese, Italy, Alessandro Maja killed his wife Stefania Pivetta and their daughter Giulia. His son survived but was left disabled by the serious injuries he sustained.
- Milligan Ricker murders, September 9, 2022, Elk Mills, Maryland. Marcus Milligan, a 39-year-old violent domestic abuser, murdered four members of his family, his wife, Tara Ricker Milligan, 37, and children, Teresa, 13, Nora, 11, and Finn, 8, before turning the gun on himself.
- Killing of the Haight family, January 4, 2023, Enoch, Utah. Michael Haight, 42, shot and killed his wife, Tausha, 40, five children, Macie, 17, Briley, 12, Ammon, 7, Sienna, 7, Gavin, 4, and mother-in-law, Gail Earl, 78, before killing himself inside their home.
- 2026 Tumbler Ridge shooting, February 10, 2026, Tumbler Ridge, British Columbia, Canada. Jesse Van Rootselaar killed her mother and step-brother before carrying out an attack at a school, killing seven people, including herself.
- 2026 Pawtucket shooting, On February 16, 2026, Pawtucket, Rhode Island, Roberta Dorgano, shot and killed her ex-wife and son during a high school hockey game before killing herself. Her ex-father in-law later succumbed to his injuries a week later.
- 2026 Shreveport shooting, April 19, 2026, Shreveport, Louisiana. Shamar Elkins, 31, shot and killed his seven children, and wounded his ex-wife and girlfriend, before killing himself.

== Related terms ==
Rates of individual homicide involving family members, not grouped by incidents of familicide, in the United States between 1980 and 2008

- Avunculicide – the killing of one's uncle
- Filicide – the killing of a child (or children) by one's own parent (or parents)
- Fratricide – the killing of one's brother
- Infanticide – the killing of one's child (or children) up to 12 months of age
- Mariticide – the killing of a husband or significant other; current common law term for spouse regardless of gender
- Matricide – the killing of one's mother
- Patricide – the killing of one's father
- Sororicide – the killing of one's sister
- Uxoricide – the killing of a wife or significant other
