= Bluestone (disambiguation) =

Bluestone or blue stone may refer to:

== Minerals and stones ==
- Bluestone, a building stone of various lithologies
- Pennsylvania Bluestone, a bluestone from a specific region in the United States
- Copper(II) sulfate, hydrated form of the chemical compound
- Chalcanthite, hydrated copper(II) sulfate mineral
- Lazurite, a sulfide of sodium aluminium silicate and the core constituent of lapis lazuli
- Sin-Kamen (in Russian literally: Blue Stone), a type of pagan sacred stones, widespread in Russia

== Places ==
- Preseli Hills, known as the bluestone area of Pembrokeshire
- Bluestone, Pembrokeshire, a luxury holiday resort in the Pembrokeshire National Park
- Bluestone railway station, formerly in Norfolk, England
- Pedra Azul (Portuguese for "blue stone"), a municipality in Minas Gerais, Brazil
- Pedra Azul State Park (Portuguese: Parque Estadual de Pedra Azul), a state park in Espírito Santo, Brazil

== Fiction ==
- Matt Bluestone, a character from the Gargoyles
- Bluestone 42, a British comedy drama TV series

== Other ==
- Blue Stone (neutron initiator), a British nuclear weapon component
- Bluestone Television
- Blue Stone (music group), an American electronic-pop musical project
- Bluestone Group, a portfolio and asset management business
- Irving Bluestone (1917 – 2007), negotiator for workers at General Motors in the 1970s
- Bluestone family murders, 2001 crime in England
