= Schlaepfer family murders =

Massacre in New Zealand

Coordinates: 37.167°S 174.871°E

- Paerata (New Zealand)
- Location: Paerata, Auckland Region, New Zealand
- Date: 20 May 1992
- Attack type: Mass shooting, stabbing
- Weapons: Shotgun; .22-calibre rifle; Knife
- Deaths: 7 (including the perpetrator)
- Injuries: 0
- Perpetrator: Brian Schlaepfer

The Schlaepfer family murders was a familicide that took place in Paerata, New Zealand on 20 May 1992. A 64-year-old Brian Schlaepfer murdered six members of his family on their Paerata farm before he shot himself. The massacre was one of the most high-profile familicide shootings in New Zealand's history.

== Background ==
Schlaepfer was a well-liked and highly regarded member of his community before the killings. He had more than 100 acres of property, on which he had constructed residences for the majority of his family. He had also established the neighbourhood gliding club, given a local scout group a campsite and even served as a scoutmaster. Nearing retirement, Schlaepfer began to suffer mild-depression and feared losing control of his farm to family members and was unhappy about any future changes made to the property. This led to internal domestic disputes with his family.

== Murders ==
In the morning of the murder, Schlaepfer quarrelled with his wife in their bedroom before stabbing her to death with a knife. One of his sons went to investigate the noise of the fight and was shot. Schlaepfer then went to the tool shed where he shot his other son. The wife of one of his sons went from another house to search for the origin of the gunshots and was wounded by shots on the way to the house where the murders had taken place. She ran to her house and called the police on the emergency telephone number (111).

Schlaepfer next shot and stabbed his grandson in his bed, then shot his son's wife in the kitchen while she was talking to the police. Schlaepfer then returned to the tool shed where he shot his son and waited for his other son to return from work. Schlaepfer shot and stabbed him when he arrived, then went into the bush near the house and shot himself. Schlaepfer's granddaughter, who had hidden from him in a wardrobe, survived the shooting of her mother and continued speaking to police on the emergency line for three hours, describing what was happening at the scene until it was secured by police. Schlaepfer used a shotgun and a .22-calibre rifle during the shooting.

== Aftermath ==
More than 60 police officers were dispatched; some went to the farm, and others ensured that the roads were safe before the ambulances could enter. When the armed cops arrived, they found the slain bodies of the family members inside their respective houses and at various locations of the farm. They were then able to rescue his granddaughter, 9-year-old Linda, the only surviving family member. After six hours of searching, Schlaepfer's body was found with a single self-inflicted gunshot wound to the head and was lying with a shotgun in an open field behind the furtherest farmhouse on the property. Police believe that he died a short time after conducting the massacre. A joint funeral service was later held for Schlaepfer and the slain family, and they were all buried together. Kerry Schlaepfer, Linda's older sister who was elsewhere at the time of the shootings, died in her sleep in 2023.

== Gun control context ==
At the time of the event, gun owners were still regulated under the Arms Act 1983, which granted lifetime licences. New Zealand legislation to amend the act in order to review licences every 10 years (a consequence of the 1990 Aramoana massacre) had not yet been enacted. Thomas Thorp considered the Schlaepfer murders in his comprehensive 1995 Review of Firearms Control in New Zealand for the New Zealand Government. Thorp found that Schlaepfer had been issued with a class A firearms licence in 1984 and had no known history of mental illness or domestic violence according to police records.

== See also ==
- Aramoana massacre
- Invercargill Tragedy
- Arms Act 1983
- Raurimu massacre
