= Murders of Calyx and Beau Schenecker =

Murder of two children in Tampa, Florida, U.S.

- Location of Tampa in Florida.
- Location: Tampa, Florida
- Date: January 27, 2011
- Attack type: Familicide, filicide, child murder, double-murder, shooting
- Weapon: .38 revolver
- Victims: Calyx Schenecker; Beau Schenecker
- Perpetrator: Julie Schenecker
- Verdict: Guilty on both counts
- Convictions: First-degree murder (2 counts)
- Sentence: Two life sentences without the possibility of parole

The murders of Calyx and Beau Schenecker occurred on January 27, 2011, when 16-year-old Calyx and 13-year-old Beau Schenecker were found dead by police at their home in Tampa, Florida. Their mother, Julie Powers Schenecker, was arrested on suspicion of their murder after a confession.

On January 29, Schenecker was admitted to Tampa General Hospital but released the next day. She was charged with two counts of first-degree murder, and indicted by grand jury on February 9. Seven days later she entered a plea of not guilty, with her legal team indicating they would pursue a defense on the grounds of insanity. Parker Schenecker divorced his wife in May 2011 and subsequently filed a civil lawsuit for wrongful deaths, following a dispute over distribution of the family's assets.

Julie Schenecker's criminal trial began on April 28, 2014. She was found guilty of first-degree murder and was sentenced to two concurrent life terms in prison on May 15, 2014.

== Schenecker family ==
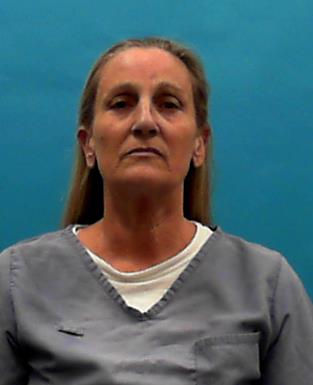
Julie Schenecker

Julie Powers Schenecker (born January 13, 1961, in Muscatine, Iowa) lived in Tampa, Florida, with her husband, U.S. Army Colonel Parker Schenecker, and their two children. The couple met in Germany during the 1980s, where Julie Powers was working as a Russian linguist.

At the time of Calyx and Beau's deaths, Parker Schenecker was overseas. Their daughter Calyx was 16 and their son Beau was 13 at the time of their deaths. According to the New York Daily News, the children were described as "cheerful and seemingly happy."

=== Previous investigation ===
Police visited the Schenecker home November 6, 2010, to investigate an allegation of child abuse made by Calyx. No charges were filed against Schenecker, but according to the police report, Schenecker acknowledged that she had hit her daughter. Calyx told a counselor in her once-a-week therapy appointment that her mother had hit her in the face when they were heading home from cross-country practice on November 2, 2010, according to the police report. Investigators that visited the home said no injuries were visible on Calyx when the report was filed four days later. Calyx had told investigators that Schenecker had "hit her with an open hand on her face for approximately 30 seconds", according to the report.

== Murders ==
On January 28, 2011, police visited the property after receiving a call from Schenecker's mother, who expressed concern at not being able to reach her daughter. Officers found Beau Schenecker in a sport utility vehicle in the garage and Calyx Schenecker in her bedroom; both had been shot with a .38 revolver and covered with blankets. Julie Schenecker was found unconscious on the rear porch covered in blood.

Police stated that Schenecker admitted to killing her children because they "talked back and were mouthy". A police statement said, "She described the crimes in detail." A note was allegedly found in the house describing a plan to murder her children and commit suicide. According to the arrest affidavit, Beau was shot twice in the head on January 27 while being driven by his mother from soccer practice. Schenecker then drove home and killed Calyx in her room as she was doing her homework on her computer. The revolver had been purchased five days before the killings. Calyx was found on her bed covered by a blanket.

=== Criminal trial ===
Police arrested Julie Schenecker at the scene. Later that day, she was admitted to the hospital for a "pre-existing medical condition". She was released the next day and taken to Hillsborough County Jail, where she was held without bail. On February 9, 2011, Schenecker was indicted by a grand jury for first-degree murder. Her arraignment was set for February 16, where she entered a plea of not guilty, with her defense team indicating they would pursue an insanity defense. Prosecutors initially said they would seek the death penalty for Schenecker, but later declined to do so. In August 2012, lawyers on both sides said they needed a year to review computer files found on the computer in the Schenecker home before trial. In December 2012, at a hearing a trial date was set for October 7, 2013, for Julie Schenecker. In August 2013, Hillsborough Circuit Judge Emmett Lamar Battles granted a defense motion requesting more time to review evidence and depose expert witnesses. The trial was delayed until April 28, 2014.

Julie Schenecker was found guilty of first-degree murder and was sentenced to two concurrent life terms in prison on May 15, 2014.

=== Civil lawsuit ===
The Scheneckers divorced in May 2011. Following dispute over the distribution of their assets, particularly to limit the money available for use in Julie Schenecker's legal defense, Parker Schenecker filed a wrongful death lawsuit against his wife.

== See also ==
- Familicide
- Filicide
- List of murdered American children
