= Jackie Cruz =

Dominican–American actress, singer, and former model (born 1986)

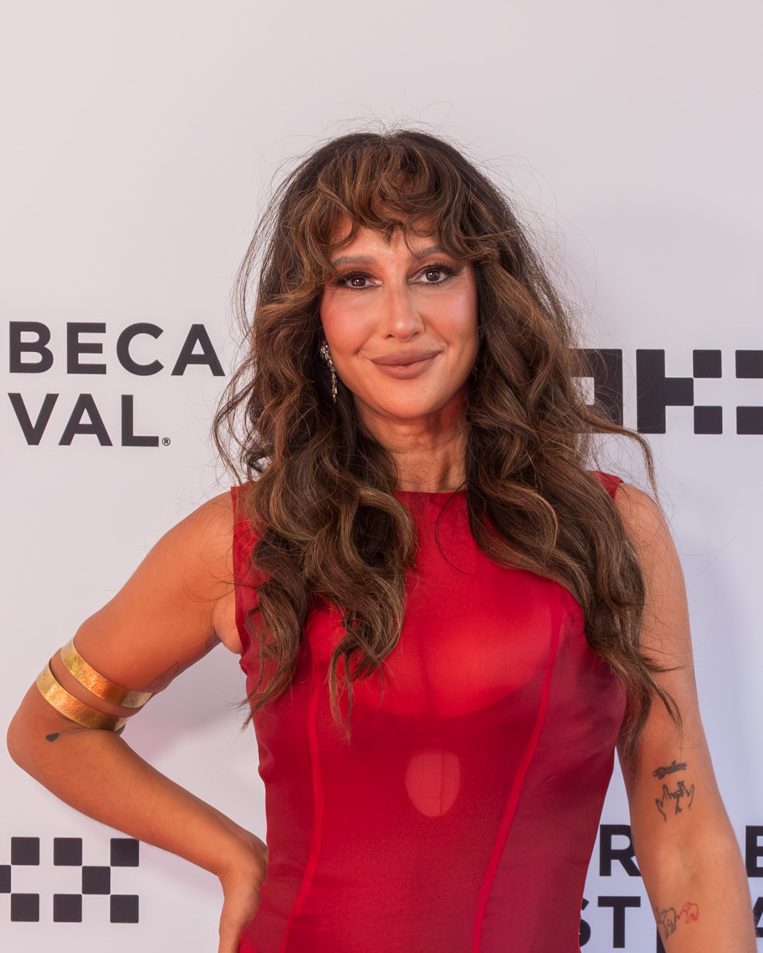
- Cruz in 2026
- Born: Jacqueline Chavez; August 8, 1986 (age 40); Queens, New York, U.S.
- Education: Alexander Hamilton High School
- Occupations: Actress; singer; model
- Years active: 2007–present
- Height: 5 ft 9 in (1.75 m)
- Spouse: Fernando Garcia (m. 2020)
- Children: 3
- Musical career
- Genres: Pop
- Instruments: Vocals

Jackie Cruz (born August 8, 1986) is a Dominican–American actress, singer and former model. She is known for her role as Marisol "Flaca" Gonzales on the Netflix original series Orange Is the New Black.

== Early life ==
Born Jacqueline Chavez in Queens, New York, on August 8, 1986, Cruz grew up between Los Angeles, California, and Santiago, Dominican Republic. She was raised by a single mother, and she speaks fluent English and Spanish. Cruz was inspired to become an entertainer at the age of seven after watching Whitney Houston in The Bodyguard. She attended Alexander Hamilton High School in Los Angeles, where she was a member of the school's music academy.

At age 16, Cruz moved out of her mother's apartment and became homeless. When she was 17, she was the victim of a car accident where she suffered a collapsed lung, fell into a coma and required brain surgery. Her song "Sweet Sixteen" is based on the incident.

== Music career ==
When Cruz was in high school, she worked with will.i.am's producers in a girl group called Krush Velvet, although the group never signed to a record label. Her debut extended play, Hollywood Gypsy, was released independently in 2010.

Cruz is a part of a band called "The Family Portrait".

== Acting career ==
In 2009, Cruz began making appearances on the E! television series Kourtney and Khloé Take Miami. She and Kourtney Kardashian became friends after meeting in an art class, which led to further appearances on the series. In one episode, Cruz and Kardashian were filmed kissing, an incident that Kardashian later stated she was "so embarrassed" by. Although Cruz initially stated that she and Kardashian remained friends following the incident, Kardashian later stated that she "can never talk to [Cruz] again".

Cruz cites Rita Moreno as an acting influence.

Cruz was working as a model and a waitress at New York City restaurant Lavo before she was cast as Marisol "Flaca" Gonzales on the Netflix series Orange Is the New Black. Originally a recurring character for the first three seasons, it was announced in April 2015 that she would be promoted to series regular for the fourth season.

In early 2022 she filmed a starring role in the romantic comedy, "Things Like This", directed by fellow Orange Is the New Black actor, Max Talisman.

In May 2022, she wrapped filming on the horror-thriller History of Evil. Her recasting into the role wasn't known until afterward.

In 2024, Cruz starred in the Lifetime film Husband, Father, Killer: The Alyssa Pladl Story which was based on the Pladl incest and murder case where she portrays Alyssa Diaz.

== Personal life ==
In 2016, Cruz told AfterEllen: "I like the person whether it's a woman—we don't like to be labeled. I'm in a relationship with a man right now, but I've liked women in the past. So I guess we don't want to be labeled. We don't really talk about it, but the actions speak louder than words, am I right? So you're seeing it. You're living it."

In August 2020, Cruz married artist Fernando Garcia. In December 2021, Cruz and Garcia announced they're expecting twins. In March 2022, Cruz announced on Instagram that she had welcomed twins (a girl and a boy). In February 2025, Cruz announced that she and Garcia are expecting their third child together. In October 2025, they welcomed their third child.

== Discography ==
- Hollywood Gypsy (2010)

=== Singles ===
Year	Title	Album
2018	Don't Waste My Time (Ft. Feefa)	TBA
2019	Melly 16	TBA
2019	La Hora Loca	TBA

== Filmography ==
=== Film ===
Year	Title	Role	Notes
2016	13 Steps	Izar	
2019	This Changes Everything	Herself	Documentary film
2020	Here After	Susan	a.k.a. Faraway Eyes
2020	A Nice Girl Like You	Nessa Jennings	
2020	Rosa	Rosa	short film
2020	Tremors: Shrieker Island	Freddie	
2021	Lansky	Dafne	
2021	I Love Us	Ruby Ellis	
2021	Nuevo Rico	Barbie	short film; voice
2021	Midnight in the Switchgrass	Suzanna	
2021	All the World Is Sleeping	Toaster	
2022	Panama	Cynthia Benitez	
2022	Bumblebees	Cyd	short film
2022	BOYMOM	Mom	short film
2023	History of Evil	Alegre Dyer	
2024	Blood, Beach, Betrayal	Lucia	
2024	Say a Little Prayer	Ruby Serrano	
2025	Things Like This	Ava	
2025	Best Eyes	Rosa	short film; post-production
2025	Betty Bird Goes to War	Bee	short film
2026	Never Change!	Victoria Mayo	
TBA	Cleveland.	Erika	Upcoming
TBA	Woozy	Gloria	Upcoming

=== Television ===
Year	Title	Role	Notes
2007	The Shield	Graciela	Episode: "The New Guy"
2008	My Own Worst Enemy	Mendez's Girlfriend	Episode: "Down Rio Way"
2009–2010	Kourtney & Khloé Take Miami	Herself	2 episodes
2013–2019	Orange Is the New Black	Marisol "Flaca" Gonzales	Recurring role (2013–2015); Series regular (2016–2019)
2014	Unforgettable	Maria Torres	Episode: "True Identity"
2016	Blue Bloods	Rosa Alvarez	Episode "Blast from the Past"
2020	Good Girls	Rhea	Recurring role (season 3)
2020	Acting for a Cause	Lady Capulet	Episode: “Romeo and Juliet”
2024	Husband, Father, Killer: The Alyssa Pladl Story	Alyssa Pladl	Television film
