= William Parente =

New York real estate attorney (1949-2009)

- Born: July 20, 1949; Bay Ridge, Brooklyn, New York, U.S.
- Died: April 20, 2009 (aged 59); Towson, Maryland, U.S.

William M. Parente (July 20, 1949 – April 20, 2009) was a New York real estate attorney known for the murders of his wife and two daughters and his suicide. At the time, he was also under investigation by the FBI for an alleged Ponzi scheme.

== Life and career ==
William Michael Parente was born in Bay Ridge, Brooklyn, to Willie and Roccolyn Parente; the elder Parente was a New York State Police trooper. The younger William Parente grew up in Bay Ridge as an only child, summering with his family in Long Beach. Parente graduated Brooklyn College and Brooklyn Law School, assisted by Anthony J. Russo, an uncle who paid his tuition to both institutions.

At his Manhattan office on the Avenue of the Americas, fellow attorneys viewed Parente as a hardworking family man. He was unfailingly polite to his longtime secretary... and worked long though not excessive hours. He didn't even curse, nor join others for drinks after work...

— An All-American Family Tragedy, Newsday, April 25, 2009

Parente married Betty Mazzarella in 1977. After becoming a member of the New York bar, Parente joined a Wall Street law partnership, moving into a private practice in 1988 after discovering his wife was pregnant with their first child. After moving to Garden City, New York, Parente and family returned frequently to his old Brooklyn neighborhood for local delicacies, staying in touch with old friends, visiting his mother, and remembering his childhood Halloweens by returning to the same neighborhood with his two daughters each year for trick or treat.

Late in his legal career, Parente was involved in making what he called "bridge loans."

"He essentially worked as a bank," reported a friend, making comparatively high-risk loans to projects pending permit approval.

In order to fund those loans, he allegedly drew on assets from investments for which he had responsibility. When at least one investor called asking for money back, Parente could neither immediately return the funds, nor successfully explain his inability to do so.

== Murders ==
On April 20, 2009, the bodies of four people were found by staff in room 1029 of the Sheraton hotel in Towson, Maryland. Police were called. The bodies were identified as those of Parente, his wife Betty, 58, and their daughters Stephanie, 19, and Catherine, 11. Stephanie was a student at Loyola College. The cause of death was found to be asphyxiation. It was later found that Parente had purchased a knife after killing his family.

Police believe that each of the murders took place at a different time. Betty was believed to be the first victim, having been killed some time during the day on April 19. Catherine was believed to have been killed soon after. Both victims were laid on a bed in the room. Stephanie, a speech-language pathology major, was believed to have been killed later on Sunday after she had left the Loyola campus for a visit from her family that had surprised her. Her roommates were also surprised because she had been studying for a chemistry exam to be taken the following day.

Around midnight, after the murders of Betty and their daughters, Stephanie's roommate had called the room at the Sheraton to check on her. Parente answered the phone, and replied that Stephanie had been staying there. He was believed at the time by Stephanie's roommate, who was unaware that Stephanie was already dead. That roommate later reported that Parente sounded "odd" over the phone, and did not sound like himself. Parente is believed to have killed himself some time on Monday morning. Hotel staff noticed that the Parentes did not check out on Monday, and there was concern from Loyola College about Stephanie not showing up that day.

=== Motive ===
The motive was believed to be Parente's financial difficulties and a pending investigation against him. It was learned by Baltimore County Police while they were investigating the crime that Parente was also being investigated by the FBI for a scheme in which investors were potentially defrauded out of $20 million. In particular, a complaint had been made against Parente for the alleged loss of $450,000.

According to the information learned in the financial investigation, $245,000 in checks Parente had written to investors had bounced, leading to complaints to the New York attorney general's office. Some investors reported following his death that they had "lost millions."

The FBI investigation, which is considered to be separate from that of the murders and suicide, is ongoing.

=== Response ===
The case was one of two familicides in Maryland in less than a week. The other one was that of Christopher Wood of Middletown, which had occurred on April 16. The two events, having been in such close chronological and geographic proximity, highlighted in the media the topic of familicide and suicide resulting from economic troubles.

The funeral service for Willam Parente was separate from that for the remaining members of his family.
