= Phillip Austin =

British murderer (born 1969)

Phillip Austin (born 14 February 1969 in Northampton, England) is a British convicted triple murderer. During the course of a day in July 2000, Austin killed his wife Claire Quinn (aged 31), their two children, Kieren (aged 8) and Jade (aged 7), and two dogs. In March 2001, Austin was sentenced to three concurrent life sentences. The presiding judge described Austin's family annihilation as "beyond the bounds of belief."

== Background ==
Claire and Phillip Austin married in 1993, after the births of their children. Austin worked the night shift as a forklift operator, and Claire worked for Northamptonshire County Council as a part-time home help. Phillip Austin was 31 years old when he murdered his family.

== Murders ==
On 10 July 2000, Austin and Claire were at the house they shared on the Standens Barn housing estate in Northampton. Austin hit his wife over the head with a mallet. After a struggle, Austin strangled her with her bra, and then stabbed her with two carving knives. Using the same mallet, Austin battered the family's poodles, Dandy and Sooty, to death. Austin proceeded to pick up his children from school, and took them out for a meal of fish and chips on the way home. Once home, Austin sedated both children and strangled them in their bedrooms.

== Arrest and sentencing ==
During the week in which the murders remained undiscovered, Austin spent the week on the run, in Blackpool and Scarborough. On 20 July, Austin was arrested in the Lake District, as he sat in his car with his wrists slashed.

When asked what caused him to attack his wife, Austin told detectives, "She started hassling me and arguing and that. I just turned on her." When asked his reasons for murdering his children, he stated, "It sort of came to me that I had killed her so I went upstairs and killed my children."

Austin initially pleaded not guilty to the murders on the grounds of diminished responsibility. Austin then changed his plea and was given three concurrent life sentences. Austin will have to serve a minimum of 20 years, after which time he will be eligible to apply for parole. After applying for parole in 2021, his move to an open prison was refused by the Parole Board for England and Wales. In 2023, the justice secretary again overruled the parole board's recommendation for a move to an open prison. His case is next up for review in 2025.
