= Samarate massacre =

2022 family murder in Italy

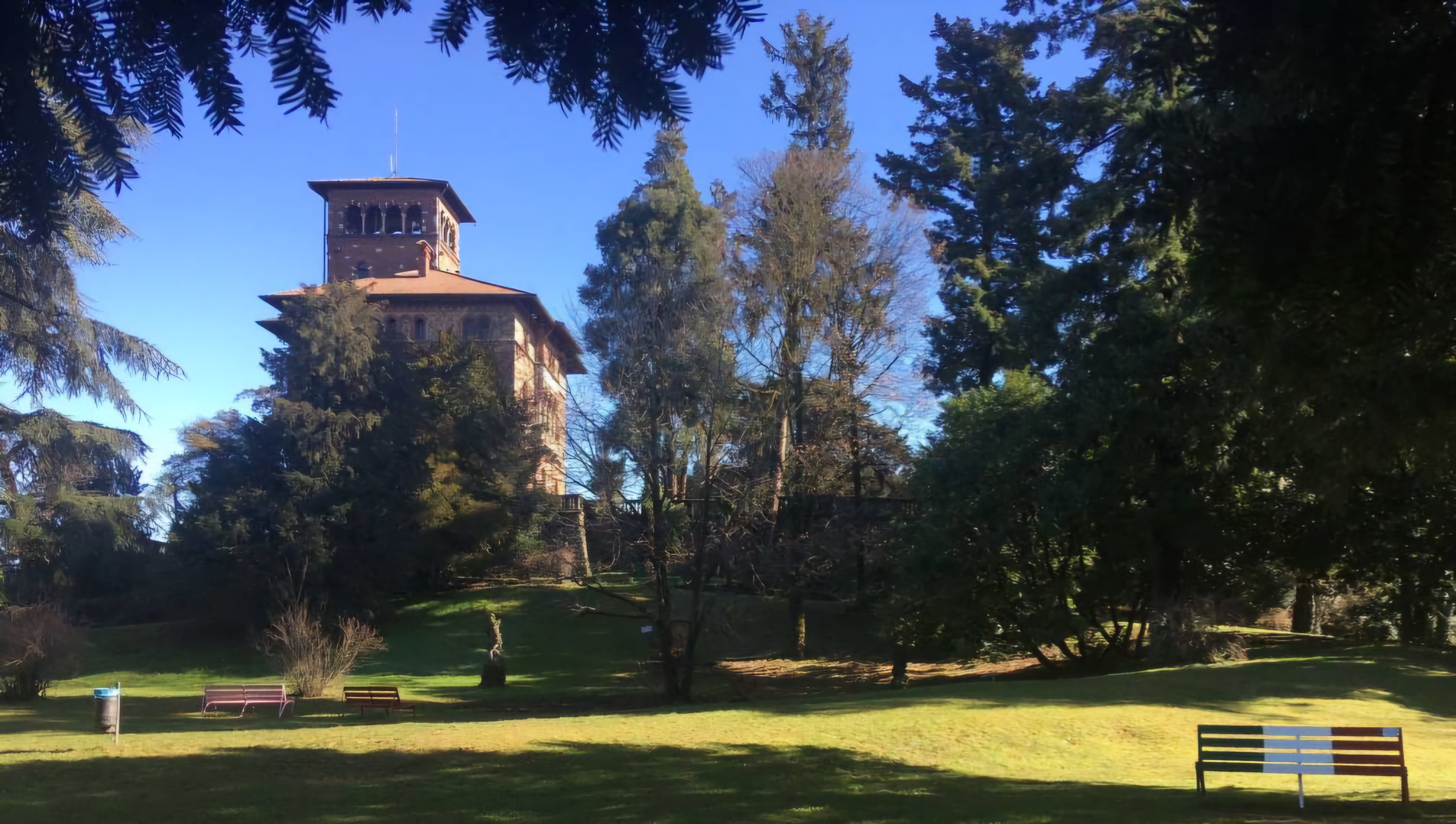
- Samarate
- Location: Samarate, Italy
- Date: 4 May 2022; 4:00 – 5:00 am (approximately)
- Attack type: Multiple homicide, attempted homicide
- Weapons: Hammer, screwdriver, knife, drill
- Deaths: 2
- Victim: Maja Family
- Perpetrator: Alessandro Maja
- Motive: Unknown (presumably emotional disturbance due to financial problems)

The Samarate massacre is a case of familicide that occurred in Samarate, in the province of Varese, Italy on 4 May 2022.

The massacre was carried out by Alessandro Maja (born Milan in 1964), a surveyor who, on the night between 3 and 4 May 2022, killed his wife Stefania Pivetta and their daughter Giulia, who was only 16 years old, with a hammer. His twenty-four-year-old son Nicolò, attacked with a drill and screwdriver, miraculously survived and was left disabled by the serious injuries he sustained. The perpetrator allegedly attempted suicide after the massacre. The motive, never fully clarified, was attributed to the state of emotional turmoil in which Maja found himself due to financial problems. The crime took place in the Maja family villa, where the family had lived since 1999.

On 12 June 2024, the Supreme Court of Cassation confirmed the life sentence for Alessandro Maja, a sentence already pronounced in the first instance.

== Crime ==
At dawn on 4 May 2022, around 6:00 am, screams for help were heard from the family home at 32 Via Torino in Samarate, alarming the entire neighborhood. From the open front door, the neighbours saw Alessandro Maja lying on the ground, in his underwear, covered in blood. Only his legs were visible, half of his body was inside the house and half outside. During the first call to 118, only an ambulance was requested, but at a certain point Maja started screaming "I killed them all, bastards!". After these words, the carabinieri were also called. It was soon discovered that Maja, with several objects (hammer, screwdriver and knife) had fatally wounded his wife Stefania Pivetta, a 57-year-old hairdresser, and his daughter Giulia Maja while they were sleeping. He then went down to the garage to attempt suicide, but without success. His son Nicolò, although in desperate conditions, managed to survive the attack. He was saved only because, before being attacked, he woke up and managed to resist and shout to attract the attention of the neighbours.

The reconstruction of the crime revealed that Stefania Pivetta was the first to die. She was killed on the sofa at home (where she was sleeping that night because she had contracted COVID-19) with a hammer blow to the skull and a stab to the throat, dying without even realizing it. Maja then went up to the 2nd floor to her daughter Giulia's room, who was killed with a single shot to the head. Her eldest son Nicolò was the last to suffer Alessandro Maja's murderous fury, from which he miraculously survived.

== Investigations ==
=== Alessandro Maja ===
The investigations immediately focused on the figure of Alessandro Maja and on what could have been the motive for this massacre. At the time of the events, Alessandro Maja was a 57-year-old surveyor with a studio on the Navigli in Milan, where he ran an atelier for Food & Beverage premises. Born in Milan, in 1999 he moved to Samarate together with his wife Stefania Pivetta in the villa where the tragedy took place. According to the testimonies of neighbors and relatives, Maja was obsessed with money and believed that his wife spent too much, even on useless things. Maja was deeply agitated because of his economic situation, believing himself to be a failure and that the family was on the brink of poverty. Over time, the hypothesis of a further concern on the part of Maja for a possible separation from his wife has gained ground, but the true motive for the Samarate Massacre is still unknown. What is certain, for the investigators, is the aggravating circumstance of premeditation.

Giulio Pivetta, father and grandfather of the victims, testified about a conversation he had with his granddaughter Giulia a few days before the tragedy. While Mr. Pivetta was in the car with his granddaughter to take her to tennis, she told him that the night before she found her father Alessandro sitting on her bed, in tears, apologizing. According to investigators, Maja had already organized the extermination of his family, so much so that he apologized to his daughter for the crazy act he was about to commit. For the entire city of Samarate and especially for those who knew the Maja family, the massacre seemed to have no explanation because from the outside "they seemed like the perfect family, never an argument, an enviable family".

== Trial ==
The trial against Alessandro Maja began in May 2023, on charges of aggravated voluntary homicide and attempted homicide. The request of the PM Martina Melita was life imprisonment with 18 months of daytime isolation, while the defence asked for the exclusion of the aggravating circumstance of cruelty together with a new psychiatric evaluation. Maja, according to the expert reports, was capable of understanding and willing at the time of the crime and in order not to lose his economic well-being he would have killed his family, waiting for them to fall asleep to strike them in their sleep.

On 21 July 2023, the Court of Assizes of Busto Arsizio sentenced Alessandro Maja to life imprisonment with 18 months of daytime isolation, in addition to the payment of legal costs. The sentence was confirmed by the Court of Assizes of Milan on 14 February 2024 and made definitive on 12 June of the same year.

During the trial, in the courtroom, her son Nicolò, who ended up in a wheelchair, wore a t-shirt with the faces of his mother and sister on it. Alessandro Maja admitted to having committed an unforgivable crime but still asked for forgiveness from his son and the Pivetta family. Maja is currently serving his sentence in the prison of Monza.
