= Pladl incest and murders =

2018 triple murder–suicide

- Location: Knightdale, North Carolina, U.S. (murder of Bennett); New Milford, Connecticut, U.S.(double-murder); Dover, New York, U.S. (suicide)
- Date: April 11–12, 2018
- Attack type: Familicide, filicide, infanticide, murder–suicide, shooting
- Weapon: AR-15–style rifle
- Deaths: 4 (including the perpetrator)
- Victims: Katie Rose Fusco (20); Anthony Charles Fusco (56); Bennett Kieron Pladl (7 months)
- Perpetrator: Steven Walter Pladl
- Motive: Revenge after biological daughter ended their incestuous relationship

On April 12, 2018, 43-year-old Steven Walter Pladl murdered his biological daughter, 20-year-old Katie Rose Fusco Pladl, with whom he had been engaged in an incestuous relationship, and killed her adoptive father, 56-year-old Anthony Charles Fusco in New Milford, Connecticut. The day prior, Steven had murdered his daughter Katie's seven-month-old son, Bennett Kieron Pladl, by smothering him in Knightdale, North Carolina. Following hours of search conducted by the Dutchess County Sheriff's office, Steven Pladl died by suicide in Dover, New York.

The news gained widespread attention for the incestuous relationship between Steven Pladl and Katie Fusco, which had been extensively covered in the preceding months, as well as the mishandling of the incest trial leading up to the killings, which had ignored Steven's history of abuse and failed to properly restrict Steven's access to Katie and their son Bennett.

== Background ==
Steven Pladl was born on April 6, 1975, in Levittown, New York. He reportedly behaved strangely throughout high school, including not socializing with his peers and wearing the same clothes to school every day.

Alyssa Pladl (née Garcia) was born in 1980, in San Antonio, Texas.

=== Meeting and birth of Denise Pladl ===
In 1995, Steven Pladl, aged 20, met and groomed Alyssa Garcia, aged 15, over the internet. He traveled to San Antonio to begin a sexual relationship with her, and Alyssa ran away with Steven to live with him in New York. She became pregnant at 16.

On January 29, 1998, Alyssa gave birth to their first child at 17, whom they named Denise Pladl. According to Alyssa, Steven abused Denise by pinching her until she was "black and blue" and stuffing her in a cooler to the point of near-suffocation. Alyssa decided to put Denise up for adoption at eight months old, because she believed Denise would not have a chance at life while living with Steven.

== Adoption and reuniting with biological parents ==
Denise Pladl was adopted by Kelly (née Gould) and Anthony Fusco from Dover, New York, and renamed Katie Rose Fusco. Anthony was a retired corrections officer at Federal Correctional Institution in Danbury, Connecticut. Katie's upbringing was described as regular and without notable incidents. She graduated from Dover High School in 2016 and had intended to attend Dutchess Community College to study art to work in online advertising.

In August 2016, when Katie was 18, she reached out to her biological parents, Steven and Alyssa Pladl, on Facebook, and they met in Knightdale, North Carolina. Katie decided to move in with her biological parents, who lived with their other two children at their home in unincorporated Henrico County, Virginia, near Richmond, a decision that her adoptive parents were apprehensive about but supported. By the time Katie moved in, Steven and Alyssa had made the decision to separate and were sleeping in separate bedrooms. Over the following months, Steven and Katie became close, culminating in Steven sleeping on the floor of Katie's bedroom. When confronted by Alyssa, Steven told her it was not her business and stormed out of the house with Katie. Alyssa moved out in November 2016, and she and Steven shared custody of the other two children.

== Incest and criminal charges ==
In May 2017, Alyssa read in one of their children's journals that Steven and Katie were sexually involved, that Katie was pregnant, and that the two children had been told that Katie was their stepmother. By this point, Steven and Katie had moved in with Steven's mother in Knightdale, North Carolina. Alyssa called Steven, who confirmed the relationship and that Katie was pregnant. Alyssa then reported this to the police.

On July 20, 2017, Steven and Katie got married in Parkton, Maryland, lying on their marriage documents that they were not related. The wedding was attended by Steven's mother and Katie's adoptive parents. Katie gave birth to their son, Bennett Kieron Pladl, on September 1, 2017.

In January 2018, Katie and Steven were arrested for incest in Wake County, North Carolina. Their charges amounted to incest with adult, adultery, and contributing to delinquency. Steven was released on bond while Katie remained in custody until trial. By early February, their arrest received international attention.

Both were extradited to Virginia to face trial, during which Steven's attorney Rick Friedman II maintained that his client's relationship with Katie was consensual, emphasising that she was "an 18-year-old woman." He further asserted that Steven had been "head over heels in love" with his daughter and that this had "outweighed the issue of them being biologically related," citing Steven's marital troubles as a factor. The judge ordered that Steven and Katie not contact each other, while the custody of Bennett would be handed over to Steven's mother in Knightdale, North Carolina.

Following their release on bond, Katie moved back with her adoptive parents and informed Steven over the phone that she did not want to continue their relationship, leaving Steven enraged.

== Murders and suicide ==
On April 11, 2018, Steven murdered his seven-month-old son, Bennett, at his home, hiding the infant's body in a closet. Bennett was discovered at 9:00 a.m. the following day during a welfare check and is believed to have died by suffocation.

The following day, April 12, 2018, Katie and Anthony Fusco traveled from Dover to Waterbury, Connecticut, to visit Katie's adoptive grandmother and clean her home. Steven knew this was a routine for Katie. Traveling to Dover, Steven located and followed Katie and Anthony's car. He murdered them with his AR-15 rifle, while they were at a stop sign at the intersection of Route 7 and Route 55 heading to New Milford, Connecticut. Bystanders reported hearing shots being fired in New Milford, and the police arrived and discovered the bodies of Katie and Anthony in their car.

Steven then called his mother and told her that he had murdered Katie, Anthony, and Bennett. He advised his mother that she shouldn't go into the house and encouraged her to call the police. He explained that a key was left under the mat for easy entry. His mother called police, who found Bennett dead in Steven's home. Steven was found dead via a self-inflicted gunshot wound inside his van in Dover, 18 miles from the shooting site.

After the killings, Friedman stated that "nobody ever could have predicted" Steven's actions, stating that during their meetings, he showed "no indication" of possibly turning to violence. He defended his representation of Steven Pladl and the court's decision, stating "If any judge or any prosecutor or defense attorney involved in any of these cases believed that the Pladl child would be in harm's way, there would not have been any bond," since, in his view, "the professionals care too much about children."

== Burial ==
The three victims were buried in Saint Charles Cemetery, Dover Plains, New York.

== Adaptation ==
In 2024, Lifetime adapted the story into a television film titled Husband, Father, Killer: The Alyssa Pladl Story as part of its "Ripped from the Headlines" feature films. It stars Jackie Cruz as Alyssa Pladl, Matthew MacCaull as Steven Pladl, and Matreya Scarrwener as Katie Rose Pladl.
