= Invercargill Tragedy =

Familicide of James Reid Baxter wife and children, including himself

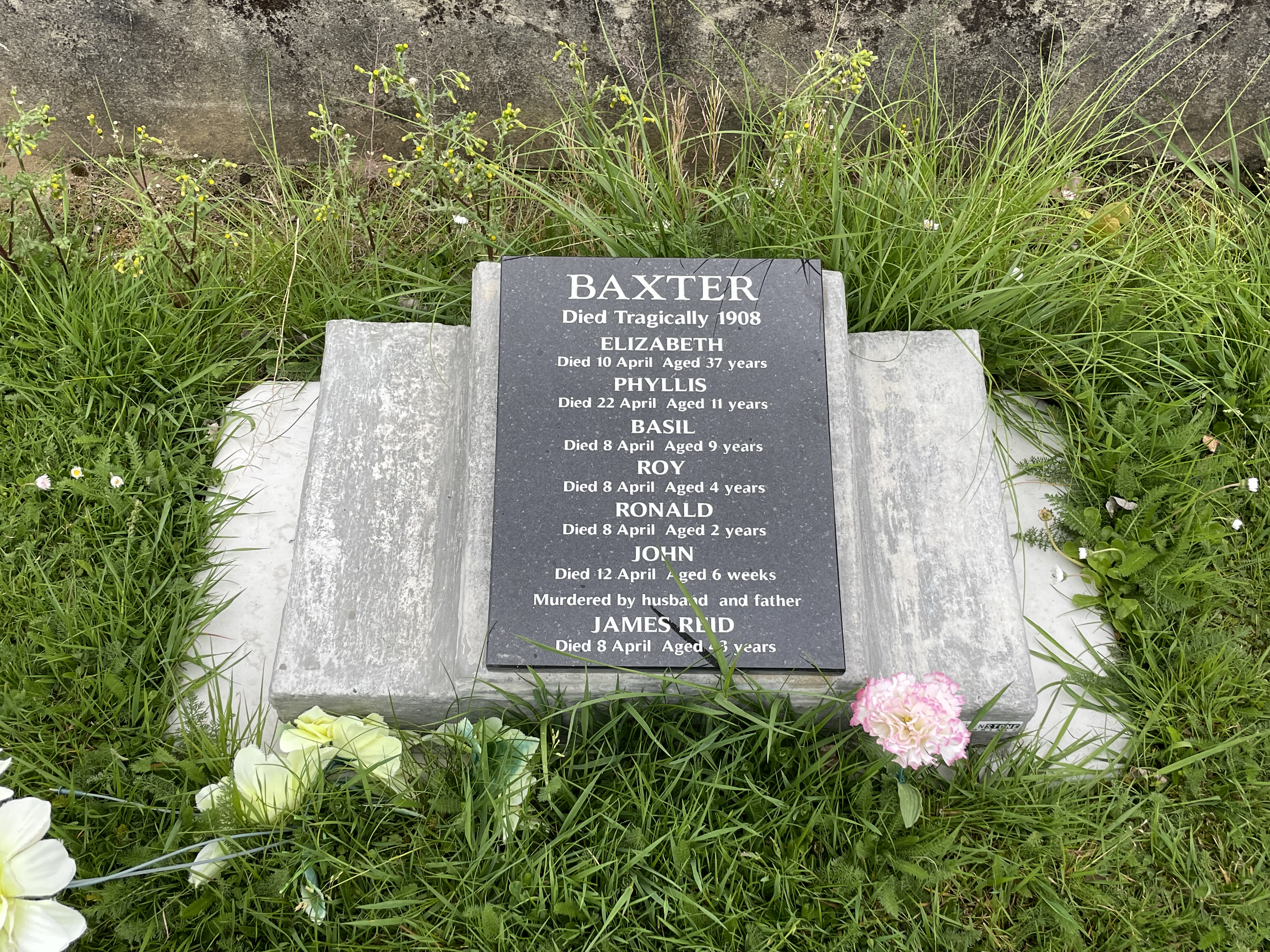
- Location: Invercargill, New Zealand
- Date: 8 April 1908
- Attack type: Murder–suicide, familicide
- Weapons: Stove scraper, 12-gauge shotgun
- Deaths: 7 (including the perpetrator)
- Perpetrator: James Reid Baxter
- Motive: Unknown
- Coroner: William Anderson Stout

The Invercargill Tragedy was a familicide that took place in Invercargill, New Zealand on 8 April 1908. James Reid Baxter killed his wife and five children with an iron stove scraper before shooting himself in the head with a shotgun. It was the worst mass murder in Southland.

== Background ==
The Baxter family had moved to Invercargill around April 1907. James Reid Baxter started a small floristry business. Weeks before the killings, Baxter had become ill with cholera. This apparently caused him to begin acting in a depressed manner, sleeping often and eating little. During this time, he slipped on a rock in Bluff, injuring his head. Around 3 April 1908, Baxter purchased a .22 caliber Remington rifle. He returned it on 6 April, exchanging it for the 12-gauge shotgun with which he would later kill himself.

== Killings and aftermath ==
The family went to bed in a normal manner on 7 April. Basil (9) and Roy (4) shared a bed in a room at the front of their Crinan Street home. Phyllis (11) and Ronald (2) shared the room behind that. Across the hallway was James (43) and Elizabeth's (37) room, in which was six-week-old John's cot.

In the early hours of 8 April, Baxter attacked his family with an iron stove scraper as they slept. All but Ronald were struck with a single blow to the head. Baxter then locked himself in the bathroom, filled the bathtub, and shot himself in the head with his shotgun. Most of his head was blown off, leaving only the mouth, moustache, and lower jaw. Early reports misidentified the weapons used as an axe and detonator cap.

The incident was discovered between 10:45 and 11:00 a.m. by neighbour and family friend Archibald McLean. He looked in the front window and saw the bodies of Basil and Roy laying bloodied in bed, called the police, and then entered the house with Sergeant Matheson. Ronald was also found dead in bed, while Phyllis was unconscious but alive on the floor. As McLean and Matheson entered the parents' bedroom, Elizabeth briefly woke, asking "what has happened?" before falling unconscious. John was also found unconscious in his cot. Finally, James was found dead in the bathtub holding his gun. The stove scraper was in the bath with him.

Elizabeth, Phyllis, and John were taken to the hospital. Phyllis was seen as a lost cause, while Elizabeth and John were thought likely to recover. However, on 10 April Elizabeth died and John's condition worsened. John died on 12 April. Phyllis regained consciousness on 11 April, but suffered from amnesia and paralysis on one side of her body. She eventually died on 22 April.

James Reid Baxter was declared to have suffered from temporary insanity. The family was buried together in an unmarked plot at Invercargill's Eastern Cemetery. Sharon Reece noted in The Press in 2014 that references to the event disappeared a month after it happened, with it being largely forgotten in the modern day. A plaque was added to the gravesite in March 2022.
