= Hawe family murders =

2016 mass murder in Ireland

On 28 August 2016, Alan Hawe (40) murdered his wife, Clodagh (née Coll; 39), and their three sons, Liam (13), Niall (11), and Ryan (6), before committing suicide in Barconey, County Cavan, Ireland.

== Background ==
Alan Hawe was the eldest child of Stephen and Olive Hawe and grew up in Windgap in the south-west of County Kilkenny. Alan had been a successful handball player and had won many regional championships in his youth. Clodagh Hawe (née Coll) was the daughter of Mary and Pat Coll was a native of Mountnugent, a village also located in the far south of County Cavan, the village being only a few miles south-west of Ballyjamesduff. She had one sister, Jacqueline, and one brother, Tadgh, who died by suicide in 2010.

Alan and Clodagh Hawe met while in teacher training together and married in the year 2000. Alan Hawe was deputy principal at Castlerahan National School, which is very close to Barconey (Robinson), the townland where the family home was located, while Clodagh Hawe was a teacher at Oristown National School, just south-east of Kells in the north of County Meath. Clodagh Hawe was a native of Mountnugent, a village also located in the far south of County Cavan, the village being only a few miles south-west of Ballyjamesduff. Prior to the murders, Alan Hawe had been seeing a therapist and in his last session, he spoke of his status as a "pillar of the community" and how he feared losing this position, weeping while saying "if only they knew".

== Murders ==
Alan Hawe murdered his family before proceeding to hang himself, all inside the family home at 3 Oakdene Downs, located just inside the townland of Barconey (Robinson) in the far south of County Cavan. Though reports initially stated that he had stabbed his family members to death, it was later reported that he had slit the throats of his children and that Clodagh had been found face down on a sofa with "severe head and neck injuries and [with] a large pool of blood under the chair".

The murders were planned a year in advance. Two weeks prior to the murders, Alan Hawe rearranged the furniture so that Clodagh Hawe would have her back to him when he approached her with the axe. Deputy state pathologist Michael Curtis said at the inquest that the boys all had injuries at their Adam's apple and suggested this was done purposefully to prevent them from being able to scream. After murdering his family and prior to taking his own life, Alan Hawe transferred money out of the joint account he shared with Clodagh Hawe, leaving his family the sole beneficiaries of his estate. Hawe then wrote a "disjointed and rambling" letter in which he apologised for his actions, before taking his own life via hanging. In the note, Hawe also wrote that he enjoyed killing his family. In the note he wrote "I think there was some sort of psychosis that made me enjoy that", Jacqueline Connolly believes the word psychosis was deliberately chosen by Alan Hawe in order to "spoonfeed" forensic psychiatrists a motive for the crime.

The alarm was raised by Mary Coll, Clodagh's mother, who arrived at the Hawe family home early on the morning of the 29 August 2016. Mrs Coll had driven to the house at Oakdene Downs. On arriving at the Hawe family home, she found no signs of life: the house was still locked, curtains were still closed and the family's cars were still parked in the driveway. Mrs Coll went around to the back of the house, intending to let herself in as she had a key to the backdoor. It was at this stage that Mrs Coll found a handwritten note attached to the backdoor, which read: 'Please do not come in. Please call the gardaí'. Upon reading this note, which was written in Alan Hawe's handwriting, Mrs Coll refrained from entering the house. Instead, she immediately contacted the Garda Síochána on her mobile phone, at around 10:40 am. Garda Alan Ratcliffe and Garda Aisling Walsh were the first gardaí to arrive on the scene, arriving from Bailieborough Garda Station in the south-east of County Cavan shortly after 11am. Garda Ratcliffe entered the house at around 11:30am, where he discovered the bodies of the Hawe family inside.

== Burial ==
The five members of the Hawe family were buried together in Castlerahan, County Cavan in September 2016. During the funeral mass, Father Felim Kelly made no mention of the murder. Relations on Clodagh's side of the family regretted this choice the day after the burial and made an application for exhumation very shortly after. However the decision to exhume belonged to Alan Hawe's next of kin which was his family. Alan Hawe's body was exhumed in May 2017. His remains were cremated in Glasnevin Cemetery. An anniversary mass for Alan Hawe took place on the first anniversary of his death in Castlerahan, despite his body having been exhumed from there earlier in the year. The relatives of Clodagh Hawe were unaware of who organised the mass and stated they felt the act was disrespectful.

== Aftermath ==
An inquest carried out in 2017 ruled that Alan Hawe died by suicide and that Clodagh, Liam, Niall, and Ryan Hawe were unlawfully killed. The inquest heard that Alan Hawe had been seeing a psychotherapist and that he was concerned about losing his reputation as a pillar of the community. Father Felim Kelly, the local parish priest and personal friend of Alan Hawe, attempted to have the timing of the inquest moved as it was close to Christmas. Clodagh's sister and mother were reportedly left €50,000 in debt as a result of the legal costs of pursuing the release of documents pertinent to the investigation of the case. They were also critical of a lack of support provided by the State and by charitable organisations to their family and the families of murder victims in Ireland generally. Mary Coll and Jacqueline Connolly, the mother and sister of Clodagh Hawe, sued the estate of Alan Hawe for damages. Olive Hawe, mother of Alan Hawe, also sued his estate, citing trauma as a result of the murders.

The family of Clodagh Hawe have called for amendments to be made to the Succession Act to prevent the families of a perpetrator of a murder-suicide from inheriting the estate. The case was reviewed in 2019 following the efforts of Clodagh's family, following reports that Alan Hawe had been seen visiting the school at which he had been employed on the morning of the killings. Also in 2019, the school in which Clodagh had been employed unveiled a new hall named in her memory. In 2025, Jacqueline Connolly, the sister of Clodagh Hawe published a memoir Deadly Silence about the murders. In the book, Connolly highlights a number of failures by Gardaí investigating the case, including CCTV evidence that was mishandled, digital evidence that was overlooked, and 20 key witnesses who needed to be reinterviewed. Evidence that Alan had a secret phone which he used to access illegal pornography featuring children was also missed. Connolly has also called for Gardaí to be better trained in investigating murder-suicides.

There were further issues expressed by Jacqueline Connolly in her 2025 book Deadly Silence. She maintained that Alan Hawe's relationship with Clodagh was a controlling one with family members referring to it as "manipulative" and labelling is as coercive control. Texts Clodagh Hawe received from her sister, Jacqueline, were immediately forwarded to Alan Hawe and the two shared an email account so that he could keep tabs on her. According to Connolly, Clodagh Hawe had also at one point told her mother that she had threatened to leave Alan over his issues with pornography. Following the crimes, it was discovered that Alan Hawe had been accessing illegal pornography featuring children, visiting dating sites, and cross-dressing in Clodagh Hawe's clothes. Clodagh Hawe's sister Jacqueline Connolly has spoken about her belief that the fear of this being discovered and losing his position in society led Hawe to commit the murders. His suicide note also revealed that he feared something was about to "blow up" when he returned to work at school after the end of the summer.

== #HerNameWasClodagh ==
Shortly after the murders took place, women's rights groups in Ireland (such as Women's Aid and the National Women's Council) criticised what they perceived as the overly sympathetic treatment of Alan Hawe in the Irish press. The hashtag #HerNameWasClodagh began trending on social media in a backlash to the initial reporting of the crime. It was noted that much of the early coverage did not feature any images of Clodagh Hawe Coverage of the murder included a quote from a local who asked "How could he kill those poor boys?" This comment was noted as excluding Clodagh. Writer Linnea Dunne wrote a blog post Rest in peace, invisible woman where she discussed Clodagh Hawe's absence in the coverage of her own murder. The piece spread on social media and was reposted in The Guardian newspaper.
