= Bluestone Group =

British financial services company

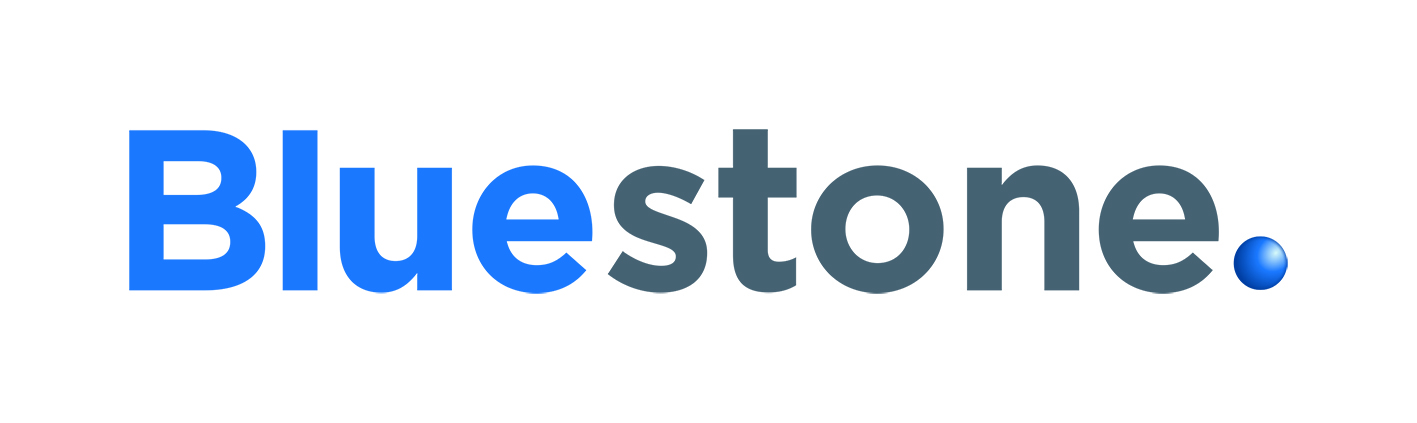
- Industry: Finance
- Founded: 2000
- Founder: Alistair Jeffery
- Headquarters: Cambridge, England
- Key people: Alistair Jeffery (Chairman, Bluestone Investment Holdings Limited); Peter McGuinness (Managing Director, Bluestone Investment Holdings Limited)
- Products: Credit management Consumer finance Financial software
- Net income: £(11.1) million (2025)
- Total assets: £20.0 million (2025)
- Total equity: £19.6 million (2025)
- Website: bluestone.co.uk

Bluestone Group is a British financial services and technology business headquartered in Cambridge, England. Its current operations include the financial-technology company Fignum and the credit-management and consumer-finance company Bluestone Consumer Finance. For the year ended 30 June 2025, Bluestone Investment Holdings reported a loss of £11.1 million, principally reflecting an £11.6 million reduction in the fair value of its investments. At year-end, it had total assets of £20.0 million and net assets of £19.6 million.

== History ==
Bluestone Group was established in 2000 in Australia as a specialist residential mortgage lender. The business was founded by Alistair Jeffery, an investment banker who had worked at Goldman Sachs and Nomura Securities in London during the 1990s. The first loan was settled in December 2000, and in the following year, a modest A$50m residential loans were written.

Bluestone's first office was in Sydney's Chifley Tower. In 2001 the business moved to Clarence Street before relocating to its Sydney office to Kent Street and then to 101 Sussex Street. The business funded its early expansion with a series of private equity rounds. The first round of A$1.8m was completed in June 2000. The subscribers were primarily private investors. A further A$4m was raised in September 2001 from RMB Ventures, the Australian venture capital arm of First National Bank (South Africa). Crescent Capital and the Liberman Family invested further expansion funds in 2002, and ABN AMRO invested A$5m in 2005.

Bluestone's start-up funding was provided via a A$250m warehouse line provided by Nomura International, part of the Nomura Group. Nomura exited its funding line in 2003 by syndicating its warehouse line to Barclays.

== Expansion ==
Between 2002 and 2006, Bluestone grew strongly. The business wrote around $100m new loans in 2002, and closed its first securitisation, Sapphire I, in May 2002. Loan volumes doubled year-on-year for the following few years. In 2004, Bluestone topped the BRW Fast 100 list of Australia's fastest-growing private businesses, having recorded turnover growth of 887% over the preceding three years. The following year, Bluestone was again featured in the top 10 of the Fast 100, with turnover of A$56m and an annual average growth rate of 178%.

In late 2005, Bluestone concluded a major liquidity event, providing an opportunity for existing shareholders to sell down their stake or exit completely, and new investors to join. RMB Ventures, who had invested initially in 2001, exited completely, and some other shareholders sold down their stakes. The resulting block of around 50% shares in the business was acquired by ABN AMRO (and funds managed by ABN AMRO Capital), and UK fund manager Cambridge Place. The transaction valued Bluestone at A$150m.

In 2004, Bluestone broadened its product suite further to include a small-ticket commercial product, lending to primarily self-employed borrowers secured on retail units, office blocks, small commercial buildings and the like. In 2006, the group also developed a servicing business, Bluestone Servicing. Up until this point, the day-to-day administration of Bluestone's now-A$3b loan portfolio had been outsourced to AMS, a subsidiary of General Electric. In early 2007, this business was bought in-house, materially increasing Bluestone's gross revenues and diversifying the business away from the 'originate–securitise' model. Bluestone Servicing was awarded an Above Average servicer rating by Standard & Poors in 2008, and a Special Servicer rating of 2 (Primary Servicing 2-) by Fitch Ratings in 2009.

== Funding ==
Bluestone originated loans using shorter-term warehouse funding, provided by Nomura International, Westpac and Barclays. The warehouse lines were periodically refinanced via securitisation, a process in which portfolios of loans are sold to special purpose entities which issue mortgage-backed bonds to fund the purchase. Bluestone completed seventeen securitisations totalling over A$4.5b between April 2002 and February 2008. The Sapphire series comprised eleven Australian and four New Zealand transactions involving residential mortgages. Emerald I and II were the first securitisations of Australian reverse mortgages. Bluestone was the first issuer in Australia to have transactions rated by all three major rating agencies (Standard & Poors, Fitch Ratings and Moody's), and bonds were sold to a mix of Australasian, Asian and European investors. In 2003, Bluestone became the first lender to issue notes secured by mortgage-backed bonds to retail investors in New Zealand. The Sapphire Securities series was fully repaid in 2007.

== 2008 financial crisis ==
In early 2007, Bluestone employed over 200 staff and was originating around A$100m per month of residential, commercial and reverse mortgage business. The market for mortgage-backed securities (RMBS) changed radically in July 2007, the start of the Credit Crunch. From this point onwards, risk aversion in the debt capital markets increased sharply, and the RMBS market effectively shut in early 2008. RAMS, a large non-bank mortgage lender failed in August 2007, the first major casualty of the credit crunch in Australia. The business had been listed on the Australian Securities Exchange just eight weeks earlier at a market capitalisation of A$880m.

Bluestone was one of the last lenders to access the Australian and NZ debt capital markets without government support in late 2007 and early 2008, placing approximately A$650m of mortgage-backed bonds. The environment deteriorated again sharply in 2008 as the equity markets caught up with the scale of the turmoil in the structured credit markets, and started a major sell-off. Confidence in financial institutions of all types deteriorated throughout the year, and many banks struggled to fund themselves in the interbank markets, where borrowing rates rose sharply. Pressure built for financial institutions on multiple fronts, culminating in the bankruptcy of Lehman Brothers in September 2008.

== Capital and asset management: 2009–14 ==
In March 2009, Bluestone established its UK operation, opening an office in Cambridge as the group expanded its capital-management and loan-servicing activities.

In September 2011, Bluestone acquired Close Credit Management from Close Brothers for an undisclosed sum and renamed it Bluestone Credit Management. The Sheffield-based business managed more than 170,000 customer accounts; the acquisition approximately doubled the number of accounts managed by Bluestone and added about 165 employees to its European operations.

Later in 2011, Bluestone established its Irish business through the purchase, with Värde Partners, of a €350 million asset-finance portfolio from Bank of Scotland (Ireland). Bluestone initially concentrated on servicing the acquired portfolio and subsequently launched an Irish asset-finance lending business in late 2014.

== Resumption of lending ==
In 2014, Lloyds Development Capital (LDC) acquired approximately 50% of the shares in Bluestone from a number of existing shareholders, joining Macquarie Bank as Bluestone's major institutional shareholders. At the same time, the holding structure of the Group was inverted with the creation of a new UK top-co, Bluestone Consolidated Holdings Limited, which in June 2015 had net assets of £35m. Residential lending resumed in Australia in 2013, funded by a warehouse line from Macquarie Bank, and Bluestone started lending into the auto and equipment space in Ireland in 2014. Bluestone securitised residential mortgages in 2013 in both Australia and New Zealand, taking advantage of the normalisation of the capital markets globally.

In December 2022, the UK holding company changed its name from Bluestone Consolidated Holdings Limited to Bluestone Investment Holdings Limited and adopted investment holding company accounting status.

== Sale of Australasian operations ==
On 26 February 2018, Bluestone agreed to sell its Australasian mortgage-lending and portfolio-servicing operations to an affiliate of Cerberus Capital Management. The transaction covered businesses in Australia, New Zealand and the Philippines, including the group's Manila operations, and Bluestone Group UK was to divest its entire interest in the Asia-Pacific business.

At the time of the announcement, the Australasian business had originated more than A$6 billion of loans, served over 37,000 customers and completed more than 24 securitisations in Australia. The consideration was not publicly disclosed. The acquisition was reported as completed in April 2018.

A portion of the sale proceeds were then used by Bluestone's parent company, Bluestone Consolidated Holdings, to fund the buy-back and cancellation of all shares held by LDC. The transaction resulted in the management team led by Alistair Jeffery acquiring a controlling stake in the company, with major institutional shareholder Macquarie Bank doubling its shareholding to 30%. Following completion, Bluestone Group had a team in Europe of 170 staff and net assets of over £20 million (A$35 million). Around the same time, Bluestone moved its head office to One Station Square, in the heart of Cambridge's construction and technology area.

== Fignum ==
Fignum Limited was incorporated in April 2019 and developed from Bluestone Group's dedicated in-house information-technology team. It was established to commercialise loan-origination and servicing software originally developed for Bluestone's mortgage, motor-finance and consumer-finance businesses, as well as to supply external lenders.

Fignum markets a cloud-based software-as-a-service product range known as the Evolve Suite. Its products include Origin, a loan-origination and underwriting system, and Adapt, which manages loan servicing; a debt-management and collections product named Thrive is under development. When Bluestone Mortgages and Bluestone Motor Finance were sold in 2023, the parties announced their intention to maintain the businesses' technology relationships with Fignum after completion. In March 2026, Fignum agreed to develop its Adapt servicing platform for Close Brothers Motor Finance, integrating it with an existing Fignum platform used by the lender.

For the year ended 30 June 2025, Fignum reported revenue of £5.09 million, compared with £5.90 million in 2024, while its loss after tax increased from £0.80 million to £1.70 million. Its average number of employees increased from 24 to 26.

== Sale of Bluestone Mortgages and Bluestone Motor Finance ==
In March 2023, Shawbrook Bank announced that it had agreed to acquire Bluestone Mortgages in a cash-and-share transaction. The acquisition completed on 31 May 2023 after regulatory approval. At the time the agreement was announced, Bluestone Mortgages had originated more than £1.8 billion of residential mortgages and managed a loan book of more than £1.3 billion. Shawbrook subsequently reported total consideration of £44.7 million, with no contingent consideration.

Bluestone Investment Holdings' later accounts recorded an investment in Marlin BidCo, Shawbrook's then-parent company. Following Shawbrook's 2025 listing, Bluestone expected that investment to return approximately £1.9 million in cash and listed Shawbrook shares valued at £10.6 million, making Bluestone Investment Holdings a direct shareholder in Shawbrook.

In September 2023, Close Brothers announced that it had agreed to acquire Bluestone Motor Finance (Ireland) in a cash transaction. The acquisition completed on 31 October 2023 for cash consideration of €17.2 million, after which the business was rebranded as Close Brothers Motor Finance.

Bluestone operational history

	UK
Receivables management	
Debt collections	
Portfolio purchase	
Financial technology	
