= Bluestone family murders =

2001 family murder in Gravesend, Kent, England

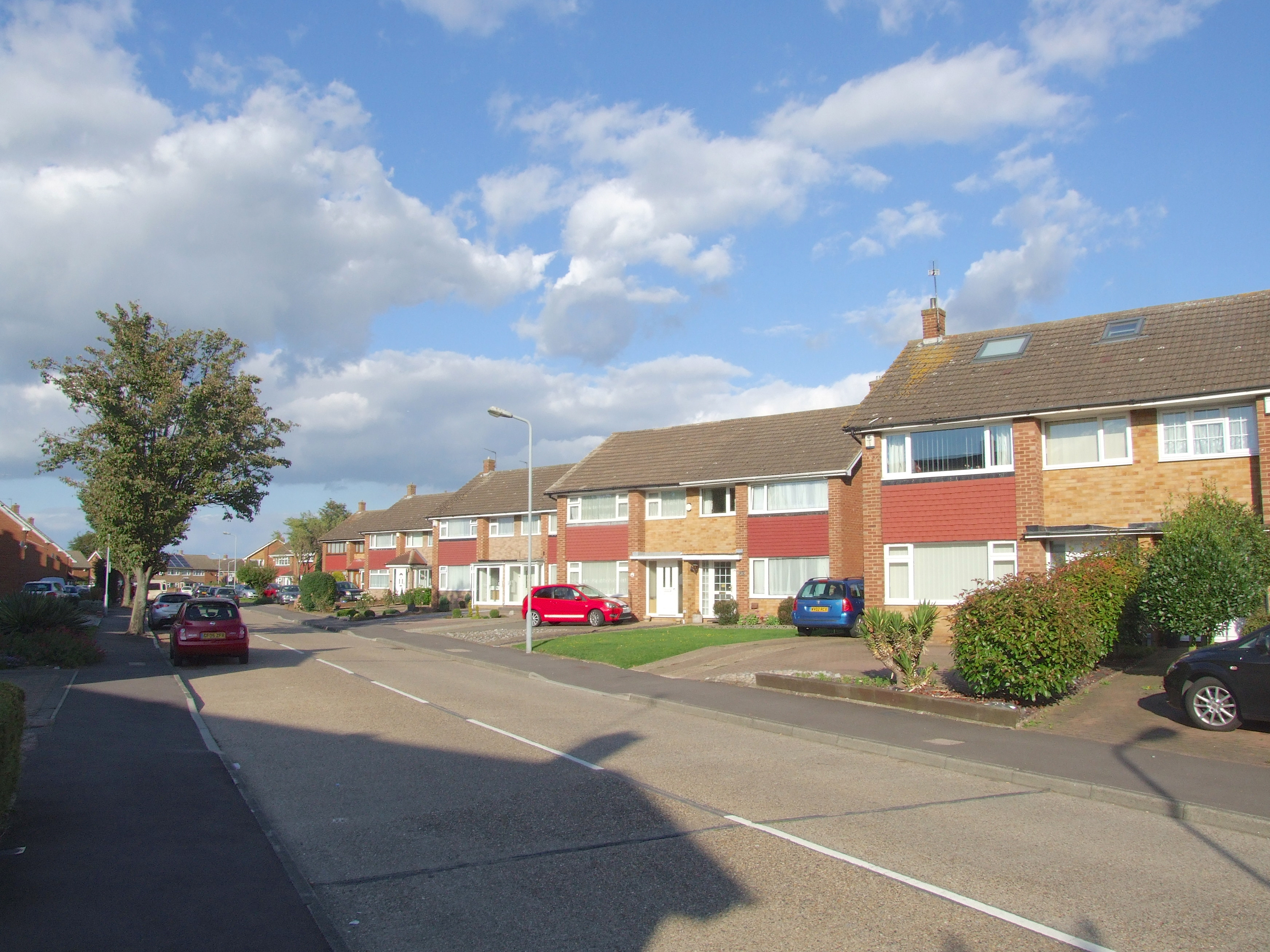
- Marling Way, Riverview Park, Gravesend
- Location: Gravesend, Kent, England
- Date: 28 August 2001 c. 10 p.m. GMT
- Attack type: Triple murder, Familicide, murder-suicide
- Weapon: Claw hammer
- Deaths: 4 (including the perpetrator)
- Injuries: 2
- Victims: Jill Bluestone, Henry Bluestone, Chandler Bluestone
- Perpetrator: PC Karl Bluestone
- Motive: Domestic violence; Paranoia over supposed affair

The Bluestone family murders occurred in Gravesend, Kent, England on 28 August 2001. Police officer Karl Bluestone murdered his wife Jill and two of the couple's children with a claw hammer before killing himself in the garage. The two oldest children survived the attack.

== Events ==
Karl Bluestone joined Kent Police in 1987. He had a history of domestic violence, had accused his wife of having an affair before the murders, and had bugged her car with a listening device. In June 1999, he was arrested for injuring one of his children when he threw a cup across the room. His wife Jill had run to call neighbours for help.

On 28 August 2001, seven-year-old Jessica Bluestone ran to neighbours shouting "my daddy is trying to hurt me." The police were called, and they arrived to the property, 92 Marling Way, in the Riverview Park area at 10pm, where they found the bludgeoned body of Jill Bluestone Jill had suffered 30 blows to the head. The couple's three-year-old son, Henry was found dead in his cot.

Karl Bluestone was found hanging in the garage at the end of the garden. The family's three other children were taken to the Darent Valley Hospital in Dartford, where 18-month-old Chandler died of his injuries. The couple's eight-year-old son, Jack, was transferred to London's Kings College Hospital with severe injuries.

Victims:

- Jill Bluestone, 31
- Henry Bluestone, three
- Chandler Bluestone, one

The funerals of Jill Bluestone and her two sons were held at Nunthorpe Methodist Church in Middlesbrough on 7 September 2001. Karl was given a separate burial.

== Inquest ==
The November 2001 inquest revealed that Bluestone attacked his family after his wife told him that she was leaving and taking the children with her.

== Parliament ==
The case was brought up in the House of Commons on 19 July 2002. Labour MP for Luton South Margaret Moran asked Minister of State for Policing John Denham how many domestic violence incidents Kent Police had recorded. The minister confirmed that four incidents had been recorded but no disciplinary action was undertaken in relation to any of them.

== Media coverage ==
Jeanette Winterson criticised the media coverage of the case.
