= Timothy Jones Jr. =

American murderer on South Carolina's death row

- 2023 Jones' mugshot
- Born: December 28, 1981 (age 44); Chicago, Illinois, U.S.
- Status: Incarcerated on death row
- Conviction: Murder (5 counts)
- Penalty: Death

Details
- Victims: 5 (his children)
- Date: August 28, 2014
- Country: United States
- State: South Carolina
- Date apprehended: September 6, 2014

Timothy Ray Jones Jr. (born December 28, 1981) is an American convicted mass murderer who killed his five children: Merah (aged 8), Elias (aged 7), Nahtahn (aged 6), Gabriel (aged 2), and Abigail Elaine (age 1), in their mobile home along South Lake Drive in Lexington County, South Carolina. Jones admitted to working Nahtahn to death and killed the other four children in a panic. Jones pleaded not guilty by reason of insanity, but the court rejected this plea. He was found guilty of five counts of murder in 2019 and was sentenced to death. As of 2022 he is awaiting execution on death row in South Carolina. The South Carolina Supreme Court denied his appeal.

== Personal life ==
Timothy Jones Jr. was born on December 28, 1981 to parents Timothy Jones Sr. and Cindy Jones, who was 16 when she became pregnant. Her husband described Cindy Jones as violent and erratic. She behaved strangely, giving Timothy Jones Jr. laxatives as an infant and cutting up clothes with knives. Though she was never formally diagnosed, it is believed she had a mental illness. When her son was 18 months old, she left the family. Timothy Jones Sr. later remarried. In 2001 Jones Jr. was arrested in Illinois for possession of cocaine, check-forgery, and car theft. He was sentenced to seven years in prison but was released two years later in 2003.

Timothy Jones Jr. met Amber Kyzer, a Pennsylvania native, in Chicago. In June 2004, 22-year-old Jones married 18-year-old Kyzer in DuPage County, Illinois. Timothy's now ex-wife Amber gave birth to five children: Merah, born in Pennsylvania, Elias and Nahtahn, (Note: Pronounced na-ton) born in Mississippi, and Gabriel and Abigail, born in South Carolina. In 2011 Jones graduated from Mississippi State University with a degree in computer engineering. He moved to South Carolina to work as an engineer for Intel in Columbia, earning a salary of approximately $71,000 annually. The couple moved into an inexpensive trailer in Lexington County in the suburbs of Columbia; Amber was a stay-at-home mother. In her testimony at trial, Amber indicated that her ex-husband believed, "women are to be seen and not heard, keep the children out of the way… at one point wanted a farm full of children." Jones is a strict Christian fundamentalist. After his arrest, police seized his religious belongings, including scripture with verses highlighted on corporal punishment.

=== Divorce ===
The couple separated for two weeks in May 2012, and according to Jones' divorce lawyer, when Jones returned to their shared home, he discovered that his wife "was putting the children to bed and then going next door to meet her paramour." According to court records, Amber was having an affair with a 19-year-old neighbor. Jones began meeting with a family therapist and marriage counselor, April M. Hames. He stated that he distrusted his wife because of his troubled childhood. He also accused his wife of neglecting the children, resulting in the state's Department of Social Services (DSS) opening an investigation in the family's home in 2011. Investigators found the home in a state of disarray but closed the case. The couple remained split, with Timothy Jones taking the children to Mississippi to live with his parents. In later court depositions, Dr. Hames noted that Jones "did not want to feel abandoned by his wife." When Amber became pregnant with the couple's youngest child, Abigail, Timothy Jones was tested to verify he was the biological father, which he was. The couple finalized their divorce in October 2013. Timothy Jones was awarded custody, while Mrs. Jones only retained visitation rights and was required to be supervised by her husband. Timothy Jones and the children returned to Lexington County, moving into a mobile home. The mother's visits rarely took place at the rented trailer, usually occurring at a Chick-fil-A in Lexington. Reportedly, Jones allowed his ex-wife to talk to the children over the phone each night. On Sunday evenings, Jones allowed his children to participate at youth night programs at The Salvation Army.

Jones lived in a trailer off of a dirt road in Red Bank, a neighborhood of Lexington, South Carolina. Jones was investigated twice for child abuse during this time, but investigators found no evidence that would warrant removing the children from home. In May 2014, one child said that Jones spanked him and forced him to do exercises as punishment. But since there were no bruises, investigators considered the punishment lawful. Two weeks later, Jones was again accused of abuse. The case file reported, "Mr. Jones beats the child often leaving bruising. Mr. Jones does not feed the children adequately...It is reported Mr. Jones does not want to send his children back to public schools because he does not want the school to report the beatings." Further, the caseworker noted, "Dad appears to be overwhelmed as he is unable to maintain the home." This investigation was not concluded before the children's murder.

== Murders ==
Throughout the day of Thursday, August 28, 2014, Timothy Jones smoked synthetic marijuana to cope with the stress of an impending project, leaving work in the afternoon to return his home in Lexington County to and smoke "spice". Jones then retrieved his three eldest children, Merah, Elias, and Nahtahn from Saxe Gotha Elementary School, and his two youngest, Gabriel and Abigail, from a nearby daycare. Jones then purchased takeout from a nearby restaurant. That afternoon, Jones unsafely forced the five children out of the car at a Lexington County Walmart, for which he was later charged with unlawful neglect of his infant daughter. Jones and the children returned home, and upon discovering that an electrical outlet in the mobile home had gone out, he accused Nahtahn of tampering with the outlet, because his son had an interest in electricity. Jones used torture, namely forced exercise, on his son in an unsuccessful attempt to elicit a confession from him. Nahtahn was forced to do one hundred push ups, one hundred sit ups, and two hundred squats, all in sets of ten. After sending the boy to bed, Jones returned to the room to check on Nahtahn, shaking him by the shoulders to demand answers regarding the broken electrical outlet. Nahtahn collapsed to the floor, and Jones told two other children, Elias and Merah, that he thought Nahtahn was dead. Merah confirmed that her brother was no longer breathing.

Amber Kyzer called the family home at 7:12 p.m. and spoke to one of her sons, Nahtahn. Jones testified that he heard Nahtahn saying "It was an accident, Mommy." to his mother over the phone. After that, she was disallowed communication with Jones and her children. Authorities estimate that Timothy Jones Jr. most likely killed his children the night of August 28th, 2014. At approximately 2:00 AM, Jones left the home with Merah to purchase carton of cigarettes at a nearby convenience store. Jones reportedly heard voices on the drive home, telling him to kill his four other children, because they would be better off in Heaven than orphaned. Upon returning home, Merah went to sleep with her brother Elias, who was in the living room. Jones smoked two more bowls of spice, and proceeded to the living room where the children were sleeping. Both Elias and Merah were reportedly strangled by hand. As Elias was strangled, he begged, "Dad, take me with you." Merah pleaded, "Daddy, I love you", before he also strangled her to death. Jones strangled Abigail and Gabriel with assistance from a belt, because his hands were too big to squeeze. Ross' forensic investigation corroborated this, stating it "children are elastic" and it would take between three to five minutes to successfully kill them through strangulation.

Jones reportedly attempted suicide by smoking seven or eight more bowls of synthetic marijuana, and awoke the next morning in a state of paranoia.

He wrapped their corpses in black trash bags, using bleach to cover the stench of decay. Jones later admitted to killing his children on August 28th in the family home. It is possible that the other children were dead when Amber Kyzer spoke to Nahtahn. In the trial, Travis Pressley, a prison guard, testified that Jones admitted to strangling his eldest daughter after she witnessed him murdering one of her brothers. Stephanie Stanley, a DNA-specializing agent with SLED, positively identified the mutilated bodies from matching DNA strands found in both Jones' car and home.

On September 1, Jones stopped at a Dunkin' Donuts on Labor Day in Spartanburg, South Carolina. On September 3, he went to a West Columbia Walmart. He purchased several items he used to mutilate his children, including large plastic bins, saws, and muriatic acid. Authorities believed his children were stored in the trunk of the car. His children had been marked absent at school on Friday, Monday, and Tuesday. On September 3, Amber Kyzer contacted the authorities to inform them she could not reach her ex-husband or her children, and that they had missed a scheduled visit at Chick-fil-A. Authorities listed the family as "missing" but did not announce it to the public until the following Tuesday, September 9; the day Jones led authorities to the disposal site of the children's bodies. Police did not issue an Amber alert, because Timothy Jones was listed as the custodial parent.

=== Discovery of bodies ===
The bodies of Jones five children were discovered in black trash bags off of a rural dirt road near Camden, Alabama. On Saturday, September 6, 2014, Jones was stopped in his "blood-soaked" Cadillac Escalade at a routine traffic checkpoint in Mississippi. Police noted that Jones seemed "very strange" and "maybe on the violent side." Initially, police suspected him of driving while under the influence of alcohol, but officers reported smelling burned marijuana, and a malodorous stench. When they checked his South Carolina license plate, they were notified of the missing children. Upon investigation of Jones' vehicle, police found "spice"; a synthetic marijuana, "a large amount of blood", bleach, muriatic acid,, charcoal fluid, children's clothing "but no children", materials to produce methamphetamine, and hand-written notes detailing how to kill and mutilate bodies. The notes read, “Head to campground,” “Melt bodies,” “Sand to dust or small pieces,” and “Day 1: Burn up bodies. Day 2: Sand down bones. Day 3: Mexican Border (smiley face), dissolve, and discard.” Jones was arrested on charges of driving while intoxicated, and possession of synthetic marijuana. On September 10th, 2014; Jones led the Mississippi sheriff and FBI agents to a secluded dirt road in Alabama, where five black garbage bags containing human remains were recovered, and later determined to be the bodies of the deceased children. It was later revealed in court that Jones originally planned to dump the bodies near the Mexican border. It is unclear why Jones stopped in Alabama instead. Prosecutors posited that the stench of decomposition made Jones change his plans. An officer at the scene spoke that the car "smelled with the stench of death" and was filled with blood, bleach, and maggots.

Dr. Janice Ross, who performed the autopsies, indicated that the bodies of the deceased children were significantly decomposed with tissue loss from animal eating, and maggots were present. Dr. Ross' report cited that the black bags sped up the decomposition process because they had been placed in the sun. The bodies had been outdoors for approximately one week before they were recovered.

In the first autopsy performed, Ross noted that Elias' body was in two separate trash bags that were torn, consistent with animal eating. The boy was clothed in a short-sleeved Saxe Gothe shirt and shorts. The report indicated that there was "tissue loss at neck; skeletonization of hands, decomposition, skin discoloration, internal organs decomposing, no natural disease, fracture of bone in neck shows strangulation." Merah, the second autopsy, was in four bags, and naked inside a sleeping bag. Ross indicated that there was animal and maggot activity present, and significant tissue loss. The child's hands and forearms were missing and that there was significant tissue loss on her body. Internal exam of Merah's body revealed that she had a blood clot on the underside of her sternum, which served as proof of potential blunt force trauma. Gabriel's autopsy reported that his body was distributed across three plastic bags, opened at the scene and not torn, with no animal activity. A bag containing Gabriel's body also contained "an adult sized shirt with bleach marks, a Hello Kitty diary, a wet diaper (not on the body) and female child sized underwear." Autopsy report indicated Gabriel had "2 parallel lines on side of neck indicative of a ligature, made by something wide such as a belt or sash." Abigail, the fourth autopsy, was also in an intact bag opened at the scene. She was wrapped in two sheets, and was wearing a diaper. The bag containing Abigail's body also contained a receipt from Kangaroo Express. Nahtahn's autopsy revealed that his body was in two bags that were open at scene, and he had been wrapped in a Teenage Mutant Ninja Turtles comforter. Tissue loss on his left thigh was significant and "close to bone". The child's knee was cut with a saw or other sharp object. The body also had an incisor injury on the left femur. Ross determined the cause of death for all five children to be asphyxiation due to manual strangulation, listing each death as a homicide, but was unable to identify a specific time of death because of decay. Ross posited that the children could have already been weak when they were murdered, as Nahtahn was the only child with food in their stomach, and autopsy reports revealed that it was only 50cc of food substance.

Jones was extradited to South Carolina. The acting sheriff of Lexington County, South Carolina stated that Jones initially refused to indicate why he murdered his children. According to court records, Jones struggled with feelings of anxiety, betrayal, and mistrust. Later, Jones admitted that he feared his children would kill him. Court records indicated that Jones claimed he feared his kids were "going to kill him, chop him up and feed him to the dogs." Jones was put on suicide watch in jail.

== Trial ==
The trial was streamed live in full on YouTube in May 2019.

=== Confession ===
Jones was found guilty of murdering his five children. At trial, Jones' recorded testimony was played for the jury. At the beginning of the tape, Jones affirmed that he was not coerced or persuaded into confessing to the murders. Jones remarked that investigators promised Jones a good burial for his children. Jones confessed that he killed his children in the bedroom of the family's mobile home on South Lake Drive in Lexington. He said that he found Nahtahn dead after overworking him with squats and push-ups, and confessed to strangling the other four, stating "that if the boy had just “come off it” and told his father what had happened to several blown outlets inside the family home, that all of his children would still be alive." Jones claimed, "any normal person would have said let me call the police and turn myself in. I took the coward route and started following those voices in my head, which led me down such a nice path I'm on today." In his confession, Jones said that he "PT'd his ass until he couldn't handle it anymore" to get the child to explain what happened to the electrical outlets. However, experts suggested that Nahtahn appeared to be strangled to death, discounting Jones' assertion. Jones admitted to strangling his youngest children with a belt, claiming their necks were too small for his hands to strangle properly.Jones then stated that he put the five dead bodies, without plastic bags, in the trunk of his vehicle. He described how he originally planned to cut up the corpses, boil, or burn the bodies on paper, as indicated by evidence recovered by police. Jones claimed he could not bring himself to do it, and affirmed that the killings were not premeditated, but stated "this was a ‘oh, shit what just happened?’" moment. Jones argued that demonic voices from his head told him to murder his children.

=== Testimonies ===
Amber Kyzer repeatedly indicated that Timothy Jones was "always a good father while we were married." She suspected that he was bipolar, testifying that Timothy had frequent mood swings and was quick to anger, describing his temperament as "always flip flopping, like Jeckyl and Hyde. "You really didn’t have to do anything to get him angry. Tim was just angry," she said. "There were more bad times than good down here." Mrs. Jones testified that her husband did not spank his children frequently, instead insisting on physical punishment: push-ups, squats, etc. Chrystal Ballentine, a former babysitter and ex-girlfriend of Timothy, testified that he was "not insane, just overangry." Joy Lorick, a family babysitter, described the Jones home as dirty, having bugs, unclean dishes, strewn clothes, and trash scattered about. Lorick further said that she attempted to tidy up around the house, wash dishes, and feed the children. She testified that one child requested that she not tell the father she fed them "because he might not feed us again." Lorick filed a complaint against Jones with the Department of Social Services after she discovered that one of the children had a black eye. Christina Elhke, the hired babysitter for the family, was the only known individual to communicate with Jones after the children were murdered. Elhke testified that she texted Jones on August 29th to ask if he was bringing the children, to which he replied, "Don't worry about this morning, I'll see you later this week."A seventeen minute phone call was placed with Elhke by Jones, after authorities had confirmed that the children were killed. According to Elhke, Jones told her that he was leaving South Carolina with the children because they needed a fresh start.

The school nurse at Saxe Gotha Elementary, Karen Leonhardt, described that the children were "in good health" and that they were up-to-date on their vaccinations and that there was no physical impairments. However, when Merah, the eldest child, appeared at school with head lice, Leonhardt met with Timothy Jones. Jones commented that he used kerosene, a flammable liquid dangerous to the touch and to ingest, to attempt to kill the parasite and their eggs. When Leonhardt suggested using a hair dryer, Jones indicated that he'd prefer to use a heat gun. This interaction prompted Leonhardt to contact DSS. Leonhardt further testified that another teacher, Amy Shearer, called DSS because Nahtahn had bruises around his neck, jawline, and on his arms. Janet Ricard, an educational administrator, worked at the school that three of the Jones children attended, and says that school officials became very alarmed when the children were not in attendance on Tuesday, September 2nd. Ricard stated that she called him several times, even leaving a voicemail, though her calls were never returned. Ricard and other school officials visited the family trailer with deputies from Lexington County. She told the court, "It was eerily quiet... like no children lived there. I became extremely concerned."

The prosecution's 32nd witness, Michael Phipps, testified before the court concerning the evidentiary contents of Jones' cell phone in the form of texts, phone calls, and online search inquiries. Phipps testified that on the eight days on and after August 28th, 2014, the day of the murders, Jones received several dozen messages and calls from his ex-wife, Amber Kyzer; babysitters, relatives, Saxe Gothe Elementary School staff members, and his boss at Intel. He only responded to a few. Search inquiries included "Facing Legal Problems - where do you run?", which countries lack extradition, garbage dumps, businesses that sold synthetic marijuana, a movie trailer for A Beautiful Mind, and lyrics to Styx's Renegade, in which Tommy Shaw sings as a man facing execution. On the night of the murder, Jones allegedly watched a graphic prison rape scene from the movie American History X and listened to the song "Butterfly Kisses" by Bob Carlisle. Frierson suggested this meant Jones understood the moral and legal implications of what he did.

At a gas station in Greenville, Alabama, cashier Linda Watkins testified she noticed could smell him Timothy Jones soon as soon as he entered to buy cigarettes, water, and an energy drink. Jones asked for directions to a rural location where he could camp. She testified, stating she directed him to a location approximately 3 to 4 miles away from the gas station. On the stand, the police officer that stopped Jones in Alabama stated that Jones told investigators that the bad smell emanating from his SUV was "garbage". Another deputy testified that when Jones was asked about the location of his children, he stated that did not have any. When asked a second time, Jones stated that he only had three children.

Prison guard Travis Pressley testified that Jones admitted to killing his daughter, reportedly saying he "choked her 'til she turned purple." Pressley further cited, "He said that when he saw the daughter, she was shocked – and I guess, I don't know, she tried to run away or what – he grabbed her and choked her so hard". Another prison guard, Ben Boyd, provided testimony to support Pressley's statement. Boyd stated he heard Jones admitting to killing Nahtahn, having said "His son was just messing with the light socket and he grabbed him and he choked him ... then he said while he was choking his son, his daughter came in the room, and that was the last part I heard."

On day 12 of the trial, a psychiatrist, Dr. Richard Frierson, testified that Jones did not have schizophrenia, instead diagnosing him with a substance-induced psychotic disorder, cannabis use disorder, and alcohol use disorder. He did not detect any cognitive impairments as a result of Jones' traumatic brain injury. Frierson stated that he "strongly considered" that Jones was faking or exaggerating his symptoms, but did not include malingering as a diagnosis, saying "I did not diagnose him with malingering, because I felt [...] that rather than maybe exaggerating symptoms to be found insane, that he was exaggerating symptoms to convince himself he's mentally ill, so he can live with what he did."

Jones' defense team argued that he was not guilty by reason of insanity, because he was incapable of reasoning, and "didn't know right from wrong either morally or legally because his brain was broken by undiagnosed schizophrenia, later amplified by stress [...]" Jones' defense team furthered their defense of insanity, declaring that Jones had endured abuse at the hands of his mother, a diagnosed schizophrenic. During court testimony provided by Jones' grandmother, Roberta Thornberry, his mother was described as "nutty, crazy as a bedbug." His defense team also focused on his traumatic injury, providing the court with MRI and 3D scans that displayed a large depression in his skull and a "misshapen brain". In court, Jones sobbed throughout the playing of the recording of his confession. However, the court-appointed psychologist later declared that Jones made a conscious decision to kill his children.

=== Verdict ===
After 15 days of testimony, on June 4, 2019, a jury found Timothy Jones guilty of all five counts of murder. On June 13, a jury agreed on the existence of an aggravating circumstance and sentenced Jones to death. (Note: In South Carolina, death penalty trials must be done in two parts: one to determine guilt and the second to sentence the accused.) Jones was one of two men sentenced to death in South Carolina in 2019. As of 2023 he is awaiting execution on death row.

=== Appeal ===
In 2021, Jones requested the South Carolina Supreme Court to look at the case, and claiming that the trial was unfair. On March 29, 2023, the Court issued an opinion affirming his conviction and death sentence.

== In media ==
The murders and their effect on Jones' father Timothy Jones, Sr. were explored in Season 1 Episode 4 of the 2026 Discovery Channel documentary series Evil Lives Here: My Child the Killer, entitled "The Sins of Our Son."

== See also ==
- Capital punishment in South Carolina
- List of death row inmates in the United States § South Carolina
- Khoua Her - a similar parent who strangled her children
