= Khoua Her =

Hmong mass murderer (born 1973)

- Born: December 31, 1973 (age 52); Thailand
- Status: Incarcerated

Details
- Victims: 6
- Date: September 3, 1998
- State: Minnesota
- Location: Saint Paul

Khoua Her (born December 31, 1973) is a Hmong mass murderer of Laotian descent. In 1998, she strangled all six of her children. The murders of her children are the worst mass murder in Saint Paul, Minnesota, as well as being one of the worst cases of filicide in American history.

== Background ==
Khoua Her was born in 1973 in a refugee camp in Thailand. At age 12, she married Kong Hang in an arranged marriage. At age 19, she had already given birth to six children. The family immigrated to the United States, where Her held various production and translation jobs. The family lived in a public housing project. The couple would fight often; police were called to their apartment on numerous occasions due to the disturbance. Hang moved out of the house after Her filed an order of protection against him after numerous instances of domestic violence. According to the Star Tribune, a friend of Her's boyfriend said Her "loved her children but regretted marrying so young"; the friend told the Star Tribune that Her "was depressed over the amount of responsibility she had".

== The murders ==
On September 3, 1998, under the guise of hide-and-seek, Her called her eldest child, 11 year-old Koua Eai Hang, inside before strangling him with a cloth. She repeated this with her other five children: Samson Hang, 9; Nali Hang, 9; Tang Lung Hang, 7; A-ee Hang, 6; and Tang Kee Hang, 5. After she killed all of her children, she put on a ceremonial red dress, and tied an extension cord around her neck and hung herself from the lamp fixture, in an attempt to commit suicide. The fixture broke from the ceiling and she fell. She then called the police saying she killed her children. Police found her laying semi-unconscious in doorway behind one of her children. Paramedics took her to a hospital to treat her for her injuries.

== Legal proceedings ==
A psychiatric evaluation was ordered to see if Her was competent to stand trial. She was charged with six counts of second-degree murder and was held on 1 million dollar bail. She initially pleaded not guilty before taking a plea deal, pleading guilty to the original charges. She was sentenced to 50 years in prison, with parole after 33 years.

== Aftermath ==
St. Paul Mayor Norm Coleman called the murders a tragedy of overwhelming proportions. In response to the events, the Hmong 18 council was founded by General Vang Pao to aid in social, medical, and legal services for the Hmong community in Minnesota. In 1998, the Hmong Health Resource Group was founded in response to the murders. Almost 10 years after the murders, the children's graves were finally marked and given individual headstones.

== See also ==
- Timothy Jones Jr.
- Andrea Yates
- Lindsay Clancy
