= Megalopolis (disambiguation) =

A megalopolis is an extensive metropolitan area or a long chain of continuous metropolitan areas

Megalopolis (Greek for large city, great city) may also refer to:

== Related concepts ==
- Megacity
- Urban agglomeration
- Ecumenopolis

== Places ==
- Megalopolis, Greece, now known as Megalópoli
- Megalopolis, modern Latin name for the Mecklenburg region, Germany
- Aphrodisias, a small city in Caria, Asia Minor, previously named Megale Polis
- Sivas, Turkey

== Science fiction ==
- Doomed Megalopolis, an anime rendition of the Japanese literary epic Teito Monogatari
- Megalopolis (film), a 2024 film by Francis Ford Coppola set in an imaginary New York City

== See also ==
- Metropolis
