= Settlement hierarchy =

Classification system for human settlements

A settlement hierarchy is a way of arranging settlements into a hierarchy based upon their size. The term is used by landscape historians and in the National Curriculum for England. The term is also used in the planning system for the UK and for some other countries such as Ireland, India, and Switzerland. The term was used without comment by the geographer Brian Roberts in 1972.

== Overview ==
In Europe, centuries-old settlements were surrounded by farmland and tended not to be wider than 30 minutes' walk from one end to the other, with wealthier people monopolising the "town centre", and poorer people living on the town's outskirts or nearby countryside (the "sphere of influence"). With the advent of decentralization technologies (e.g., bicycles, trains, cars, etc.), American settlements reversed this trend before reaching their saturation point, with vast farmlands managed by homesteads located dozens of miles away from the nearest settlement; lower-income communities occupied the "centre" as the middle-income and upper-income migrated into suburbia. This created a phenomenon known as urban decay.

A settlement's population size, its geographic area, its status, and the availability of services can all affect this hierarchy. Position in a settlement hierarchy can also depend on the sphere of influence. This is how far people will travel to use the services in the settlement: if people travel further the town becomes more important and ranks higher in the settlement hierarchy.

A collection of the most widely accepted units of measuring a settlement's size is as follows:

Isolated Dwelling < Hamlet < Village < Small Town < Large Town < City < Conurbation

=== Problems with concept of a settlement hierarchy ===
Using the title of a settlement can be misleading in the absence of any widely accepted definition. For example, city status in the United Kingdom historically arose from its place in the ecclesiastic hierarchy. (In modern times, city status is awarded for secular reasons but without reference to size.) Thus, some cathedral cities in England (e.g., Ely, Cambridgeshire) have a much smaller populations than some towns (e.g., Luton). In some parts of the United States, the distinction between town and city is a matter of a decision by local government to incorporate. In addition, there is no agreement as to the number of levels in the hierarchy or what they should be called. Many terms used to describe settlements (e.g., village) have no legal definition, or may have contradictory legal definitions in different jurisdictions.

In fact, all existing urban data are based on arbitrary definitions that vary from country to country and from year or census to the next, making them difficult to compare.

An Urban Metric System (UMS) has been conceived that could correct the problem, since it allows computing the urban area limits and central points, and it can be applied in the same way to all past, present and future population and job distributions.

It is based on vector field calculations obtained by assuming that, in a given space, all inhabitants and jobs exert the same attractive force A and repulsive force R. The net force (A - R) exerted by each inhabitant or job is given by [1/(1 + d)] - [1/( β + d/2)], where d = distance and β is the only parameter. UMS distinguishes the following types of urban areas, each type corresponding to a given value of β:

	Urban area	Distance at which the attractive force = the repulsive force	Value of β
1	Central city	10 km	6
2	Agglomeration	20 km	11
3	Metropolis	40 km	21
4	Patropolis	80 km	41
5	Megalopolis	160 km	81
6	Urban system	320 km	161
7	Urban macrosystem	640 km	321
8	Continental system	1,280 km	641
9	Intercontinental system	2,560 km	1,281
10	World system	5,120 km	2,561

UMS has been applied to some Canadian cases since 2018.

=== Hierarchy and status ===
Position in an accepted settlement hierarchy can imply status, which in turn reinforces the position of the settlement in the hierarchy. Status can derive from being the residence of a King or high-ranking member of the nobility or from being the location of a major religious establishment. A formal hierarchy of settlements, known as a multiple estate, appears to have been common in 10th-century England. The centre of an estate (often called a "caput") could be supported by subsidiary settlements, which were sometimes given specialised roles. For example, a Saxon royal estate might be supported by settlements specialising in the production of cheese or barley or maintaining flocks of sheep.

== Example of a settlement hierarchy ==
The following settlement hierarchy is adapted from the work of Konstantinos Apostolos Doxiadis for the actual current world situation as of 2010, as opposed to Doxiadis' idealized settlement hierarchy for the year 2100 that he outlined in his 1968 book Ekistics. As an example population criteria for each category of settlement might be different depending on context.

In this example, a roadhouse is at the lowest level while the ecumenopolis is at the top with the greatest number of residents:

=== Minuscule density: Fewer than 1,000 ===
Less than one thousand residents. At this number, settlements are too small or scattered to be considered "urban", and services within these settlements (if any) are generally limited to bare essentials: e.g., church, grocery store, post office, etc. Throughout most of human history, very few settlements could support a population greater than 150 people.

- Village or Tribe – a village is a human settlement or community that is larger than a hamlet but smaller than a town. The population of a village varies; the average population can range in the hundreds. Anthropologists regard the number of about 150 members for tribes as the maximum for a functioning human group.
- Hamlet or Band – a hamlet has a tiny population (often fewer than 100, but sometimes more), with only a few buildings. A social band are the simplest level of foraging societies with generally a maximum size of 30 to 50 people; consisting of a small kin group, no larger than an extended family or clan.
- Homestead or Neighbourhood – a homestead usually consists of a cluster of isolated dwellings normally occupied by a single extended family, normally would only have one to five buildings or elementary families.
- Roadhouse or Bed and breakfast – a roadhouse is a small mixed-use premises typically built on or near a major road in a sparsely populated area or an isolated desert region that services the passing travellers, providing food, drinks, accommodation, fuel, and parking spaces to the guests and their vehicles. The premises generally consists of just a single dwelling, permanently occupied by a nuclear family, usually between two and five family members. A roadhouse is often considered to be the smallest type of human settlement.

=== Low density: 1,000 to 100,000 residents ===
Less than one hundred thousand residents. Common "city features" and third place services such as clinics, pharmacy, bank, supermarket, police station, fire station, schools, residential neighborhoods, restaurant, etc. become less available as size reduces. Density may be sufficient to support local commercial areas which may include a "Main Street" or a shopping mall.

- Town
- Satellite town or Locality – a small mixed-use town or residential area, existing as a separate residential community within commuting distance of a city.

=== Lower medium density: 100,000 to 250,000 residents ===
At this density, there is ready access to less specialized services but residents may need to travel to a larger city in some circumstances.

- Town: Towns are generally larger than villages and smaller than cities, though the criteria to distinguish between them vary considerably in different parts of the world.

=== Upper medium density: quarter million to one million residents ===
At this density, there is ready access to more specialized advanced services (e.g. doctors, mechanics, colleges, etc.) due to economies of agglomeration, and enables economies of scale and for things like efficient transportation, utilities, telecommunications, fiber optics, and infrastructure that initially cost more to provide outside of urban context.

- Regiopolis or City – a large city with a large population and many services. The population is less than one million but more than a quarter of a million people.

=== High density: more than one million residents ===
At this density, the settlement's population, spheres of influence, and gross domestic product tends to exceed that of most countries with lesser density. The need for administrative divisions, public transportation, public infrastructure and other government public services is critically essential for the sustainable growth and continued prosperity of its citizens. High income jobs and non-essential luxury services are abundant (e.g. car dealerships, brain surgery centers, airports, financing, computer stores, coffee shops, etc.) as these cannot be sustained by lesser density. Medium income exceeds national average. The first city in recorded history to reach a population of one million residents was Ancient Rome in 133 B.C. During the Second Industrial Revolution, London, England reached the mark in 1810 and New York City, United States made it in 1875.

The main type at this level is the

- Conurbation or metropolis – a consolidating regional urban area or catchment area, the metropolitan area, consisting of possibly a central city, suburbs and satellite towns or cities, with a population usually reaching one million or more people.

Larger types at this level would be:

- Megalopolis or Megacity – contains more than ten million residents in total and is often a conurbation or metropolis grown into a continuous urban area.

=== Extreme density: more than one billion residents ===
- Ecumenopolis – a theoretical construction invented in 1967 by the Greek city planner Constantinos Apostolou Doxiadis, in which the entire surface area of Earth is taken up by human settlements, or at least, that those are linked so that to create urban areas so big that they can shape an urban continuum through thousands of kilometers which cannot be considered as a megalopolis.
- Doxiadis also conjectured the "eperopolis" – gigacities in excess of one billion population, in which an entire continental region is an unbroken continuum of human settlements.

== Settlement hierarchy by country ==
=== Settlement hierarchy in the English planning system ===
The position of a settlement in the hierarchy is intended to inform decisions about new developments, such as housing. Rather than define the hierarchy by population, an alternative way to construct the hierarchy is based on the services that are available within each settlement. Settlements are described as "level 1", "level 2", etc. rather than using terms such as village or town. The Government planning statement (PPS3) does not specifically mention "settlement hierarchies", but talks about the availability of services to small rural settlements. The term is used a number of times in the guidance for preparing evidence for planning decisions; a settlement hierarchy starts with an isolated dwelling, then hamlet, then village, town, city then a conurbation.

=== Settlement hierarchy in the German planning system ===
The German planning system is based on the Central Place Theory developed by Walter Christaller in the 1930s and first applied in the Nazi Era, especially in Poland. Every settlement is categorized by function: highly central cities Oberzentrum (e.g. Hamburg, with speciality clinics for tropical diseases), middle central cities Mittelzentrum (for periodic functions e.g. Homburg (Saar) with major schools (starting at 5th grade)) and basic central towns Grundzentrum/Unterzentrum (e.g. Illingen with basic doctors and Supermarket). The number of inhabitants is less important: thus a city such as Kaiserslautern (100,000 people) can be a highly specialized city, because it is a centre for the surrounding rural area.

It is used at the federal level for the regional planning system of states and planning regions for the "State Development Programmes" (Landesentwicklungsprogramm [de]) and the "Regional Spatial Structure Plans" (Regionaler Raumordnungsplan [de]). These are political plans to achieve goals such as equivalent living standards (Gleichwertige Lebensverhältnisse [de]) in rural and urban areas in all of Germany, east and west.

== Overview of categories ==
=== By size categorization ===
- Homestead – a simple communal dwelling
- Settlement or hamlet – a group of dwellings, possibly forming a village community.
- Town – a settlement or village that has grown into an urbanized area and historically features a central market or court, particularly as a regional market town.
- City – any consolidated urbanized area, historically often with a walled urban core, and in larger urban or metropolitan areas the downtown area.
- Conurbation or metropolis – a consolidating regional urban area or catchment area, the metropolitan area, consisting of possibly a central city, suburbs and satellite towns or cities, with a population usually reaching one million or more people.
- Megacity – contains more than ten million residents in total and is often a conurbation or metropolis grown into a continuous urban area.
- Megalopolis – a group of metropolitan areas having grown together, stretching across a larger region and across regional borders.
- Ecumenopolis – a theoretical urbanized planetary sized astronomical object

=== By socio-political categorization ===
- Parish – smallest local administrative unit
- Market or court town
- Regional or provincial seat
- Capital city or metropole, exerting sovereignty
- Global city, having global standing

== See also ==
- 15-minute city – Urban accessibility concept
- Ekistics – Conceptual framework
- Green transport hierarchy – Prioritising vulnerable sustainable road users
- Street hierarchy – Urban planning restricting through traffic of automobiles
- Walking city – City small enough to navigate on foot
