= San Angeles =

Fictional concept of Southern California

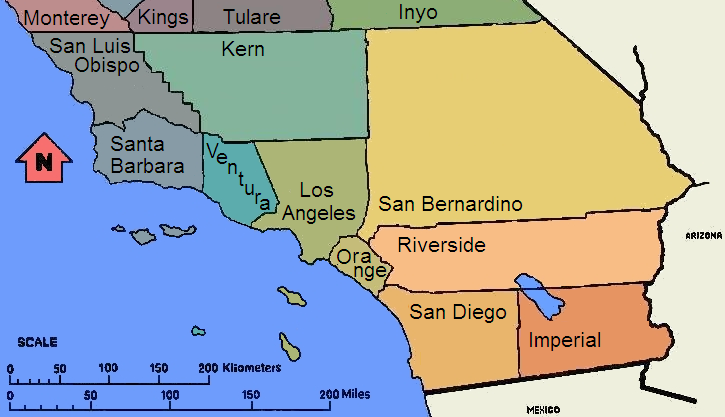
Southern California

San Angeles is a fictional futuristic concept of Southern California typically configured by U.S. commentators and film producers to include areas from Los Angeles to San Diego and sometimes even San Bernardino to Riverside. Although Los Angeles and the West Coast have been treated as a futuristic concept geographic region by different names in other works — "Los Andiegoles" in the novel A Friend of the Earth, "Rattown" in the novel Dr. Adder, and "Mega City 2" in the comic stories of Judge Dredd — San Angeles remains the more popular identifying description.

== Fiction ==
San Angeles was first conceived as a setting for the 1982 movie Blade Runner in an early script. Ten years later, the 1993 script for the 1994 movie Double Dragon, post-earthquake California merged Los Angeles and San Diego into one megalopolis called San Angeles, half of which was under water. At about the same time, the San Angeles concept city also was used in the 1993 movie Demolition Man, where the earthquake-destroyed Los Angeles of 2010 was replaced by the city San Angeles that stretched from San Diego to Santa Barbara. The Demolition Man/San Angeles, a modified Irvine, California, set in the year 2032, maintained a police force called "SaPD" (for San Angeles Police Department), which used black and white, gull-winged cars having SaPD emblazoned on them. The 1993 Demolition Man movie also set the fictional Arnold Schwarzenegger Presidential Museum in San Angeles, even though Arnold Schwarzenegger's first run for political office would not be for another ten years.

In 2000, the Icebox.com live-action Web series "The Hanged Man" positioned fictional detective Hugo Manes as being from the San Angeles Police Department. In 2001, American printmaker Edward Ruscha released a series of seven postcard-size color etchings that he entitled "Los Francisco San Angeles" to reflect how the etchings made light of the cultural distance between Northern California and Southern California. Ruscha's concept Los Francisco San Angeles was analyzed in 2004 for Arts & Activities Magazine by Tara Cady Sartorius, Curator of Education at the Montgomery Museum of Fine Arts.

San Angeles is also the fictional home town of the main characters in Power Rangers Operation Overdrive.

There's also San Angeles in the television series, Sliders, in the episode called "Double Cross", where the city spreads from San Francisco to Los Angeles.

== Non-fiction ==
In addition to uses of San Angeles by the entertainment industry, political causes and businesses alike have adopted the concept. For example, in April 1989, Camp Pendleton was viewed as the last remaining open-space barrier against a future "San Angeles" composed of Southern California boom and sprawl from Santa Barbara to the Mexican border. In 2002, environmentalist and commentator Tershia d'Elgin described a then-recent federal district court ruling on the Endangered Species Act of 1973 related to paving over land as promising "to transform our county into El Toro too. Everything that has made San Diego worth living in will be gone. It will become San Angeles." That same year, the 2002 political movement to have San Fernando Valley seceded from Los Angeles to become an independent incorporated city of its own suggested San Angeles as the potential new name for the proposed incorporated city. However, "San Angeles" ranked ninth in popularity behind the name "San Fernando Valley" in a field of eleven potential names. Along with the proposed "Los Fernando", "San Angeles" was viewed as an absurd juxtaposition which made no sense at all in Spanish.

In 2006, Marissa Mayer, Google's then 31-year-old product-launch czar, seized on the San Angeles concept to describe how Google might modify its home page:

We're still not ready to make really fundamental changes and blast all of our products on our home page. [But] there are a few key concepts I've been thinking about in terms of how we can change navigation on our site. One is what I would call the San Angeles or Los Diego strategy. You take large product and merge them together into the biggest possible nucleus. So if you took San Diego and Los Angeles together and merged them into one mega-city, that's even bigger and more memorable than the two cities independently... It is hard for people to remember more than 5 or 10 products from a particular company. If we can take each of the products we have and make them even larger and more meaningful to people, I think there’s a lot of benefit that could be had by both the users, because they don’t have to remember quite as much.

In September 2025, discussions about the possibility of opening up Camp Pendleton for development use began to surface, quoted as bringing in "unprecedented development" into the region, and as such may become possible to form a development link between San Diego and Los Angeles.

== See also ==
- SanSan
- Megacity
- Megalopolis (city type)
