= Ekistics =

Conceptual framework

Ekistics is a futurist conceptual framework for the maximal development of human settlements. Coined in 1942 by Constantinos Apostolos Doxiadis, ekistics was developed in response to rapid modern urbanization. The framework identifies five key elements of human settlement - nature, humans, society, shells (buildings), and networks - as well as a scale of 'ekistics units', delineated roughly in orders of magnitude of population. The framework's goal is to maximize all five elements for a given settlement at each of ekistics unit. Doxiadis advocated for the framework to be the foundation of a field of science, rather than an interdisciplinary framework.

== Etymology ==
The term ekistics was coined by Constantinos Apostolos Doxiadis in 1942. The word is derived from the Greek adjective οἰκιστικός more particularly from the neuter plural οἰκιστικά. The ancient Greek adjective οἰκιστικός meant 'concerning the foundation of a house, a habitation, a city or colony; contributing to the settling'. It was derived from οἰκιστής (oikistēs), an ancient Greek noun meaning 'the person who installs settlers in place'. This may be regarded as deriving indirectly from another ancient Greek noun, οἴκισις (oikisis), meaning 'building, housing, habitation', and especially 'establishment of a colony, a settlement, or a town' (used by Plato), or 'filling with new settlers, settling, being settled'. All these words grew from the verb οἰκίζω (oikizō), 'to settle', and were ultimately derived from the noun οἶκος (oikos), 'house, home, habitat'.

The Shorter Oxford English Dictionary defines an ecist, oekist or oikist as: "the founder of an ancient Greek ... colony". The English equivalent of oikistikē is ekistics (a noun). In addition, the adjectives ekistic and ekistical, the adverb ekistically, and the noun ekistician are now also in current use.

== Scope ==
In the context of outdoor recreation, one's relationship with the natural world and how one views the resources within it is an ekistic relationship.

The notion of ekistics implies that understanding the interaction between and within human groups—infrastructure, agriculture, shelter, function (job)—in conjunction with their environment directly affects their well-being (individual and collective). The subject begins to elucidate the ways in which collective settlements form and how they inter-relate. By doing so, humans begin to understand how they 'fit' into a species, i.e. Homo sapiens, and how Homo sapiens 'should' be living in order to manifest our potential—at least as far as this species is concerned (as the text stands now). Ekistics in some cases argues that in order for human settlements to expand efficiently and economically we must reorganize the way in which the villages, towns, cities, metropolises are formed.

As Doxiadis put it, "... This field (ekistics) is a science, even if in our times it is usually considered a technology and an art, without the foundations of a science - a mistake for which we pay very heavily." Having recorded very successfully the destructions of the ekistic wealth in Greece during WWII, Doxiadis became convinced that human settlements are subjectable to systematic investigation. Doxiadis, being aware of the unifying power of systems thinking and particularly of the biological and evolutionary reference models as used by many famous biologists-philosophers of his generation, especially Sir Julian Huxley (1887–1975), Theodosius Dobzhansky (1900–75), Dennis Gabor (1900–79), René Dubos (1901–82), George G. Simpson (1902–84), and Conrad Waddington (1905–75), used the biological model to describe the "ekistic behavior" of anthropos (the five principles) and the evolutionary model to explain the morphogenesis of human settlements (the eleven forces, the hierarchical structure of human settlements, dynapolis, ecumenopolis). Finally, he formulated a general theory which considers human settlements as living organisms capable of evolution, an evolution that might be guided by Man using "ekistic knowledge".

== Units ==
Doxiadis believed that the conclusion from biological and social experience was clear: to avoid chaos we must organize our system of life from anthropos (individual) to ecumenopolis (global city) in hierarchical levels, represented by human settlements. So he articulated a general hierarchical scale with fifteen levels of ekistic units:

- anthropos – 1
- room – 2
- house – 5
- housegroup (hamlet) – 40
- small neighborhood (village) – 250
- neighborhood – 1,500
- small polis (town) – 10,000
- polis (city) – 75,000
- small metropolis – 500,000
- metropolis – 4 million
- small megalopolis – 25 million
- megalopolis – 150 million
- small eperopolis – 750 million
- eperopolis – 7.5 billion
- ecumenopolis – 50 billion

The population figures above are for Doxiadis' ideal future ekistic units for the year 2100, at which time he estimated (in 1968) that Earth would achieve zero population growth at a population of 50,000,000,000 with human civilization being powered by fusion energy.

== Publications ==
The Ekistics and the New Habitat, printed from 1957 to 2006 and began calling for new papers to be published online in 2019.

Ekistics is a 1968 book by Konstantinos Doxiadis, often titled Introduction to Ekistics.

== See also ==
- Arcology
- Conurbation
- Consolidated city-county
- Global city
- Human ecosystem
- Megacity
- Megalopolis
- Metropolitan area
- Permaculture
- Principles of intelligent urbanism
