= Megacity =

Urban area with a total population in excess of ten million people

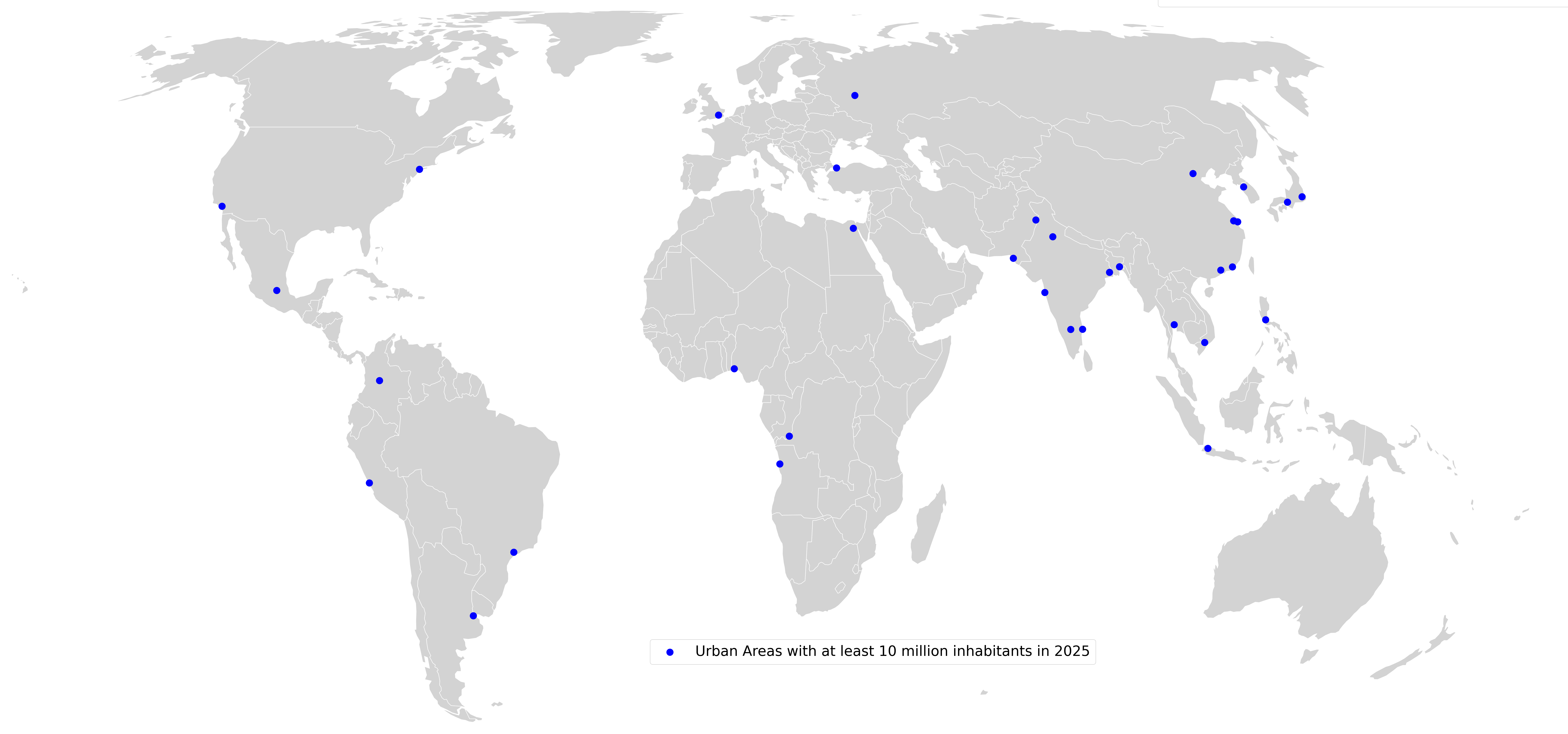
Map showing urban areas with at least ten million inhabitants in 2025, according to the GHSL

A megacity is a very large city, typically with a population of more than 10 million people. The United Nations Department of Economic and Social Affairs (UN DESA) in its "World Urbanization Prospects" report defines megacities as urban agglomerations with over 10 million inhabitants. Reports from academics, the European Council, the Organisation for Economic Co-operation and Development delineate them as the metropolitan areas that are inhabited by more than a total population of 10 million people. The fast growth of the former is attributed to the proliferation of the latter. Infrequently in some sources, from five to eight million is considered the minimum threshold, along with a population density of at least 2,000 per square kilometre. The terms conurbation, metropolis, and metroplex are also applied to the latter.

The total number of megacities in the world varies between different sources and their publication dates. The world had 32 according to EU Global Human Settlement Layer (2024), 33 according to UN DESA (2025), 39 according to the OECD (2020), and 42 according to Demographia (2025). In total, at most 46 unique places are mentioned as megacities across these selected sources, although some of these are just agglomerated differently between them. A good percentage of these urban agglomerations are in the Global South's most populous countries – China and India. The other three-to-five countries with more than one megacity are Brazil, Indonesia, Japan, Pakistan, and the United States. African megacities are present in Angola, Democratic Republic of the Congo, Egypt, Nigeria and South Africa; European megacities are present in France, Germany, Russia, the United Kingdom, and Turkey (also in Asia); megacities can be found in Latin America in the countries of Brazil, Mexico, Colombia, Peru, and Argentina.

Many recent satellite image-based sources identify China's Pearl River Delta (anchored by Guangzhou) as the largest megacity and continuously built-up area of the world. However, as of 2025, the UN sees both urban centres of Guangzhou and Shenzhen in the Pearl River Delta as disjointed megacities, and instead lists Jakarta as the world's largest megacity. Older sources, such as OECD in 2020, still list Tokyo as the largest.

== List of megacities ==
Numbers in red with an asterisk (*) do not meet the 10 million threshold to be considered a megacity.

Megacity	Image	Country	Region	Estimated population			
Megacity	Image	Country	Region	UN DESA (2025)	Demographia (2025)	GHSL (2024)	OECD (2020)
Bangalore		India	South Asia	13,187,000	16,216,000	15,178,533	14,253,019
Bangkok		Thailand	Southeast Asia	18,180,000	20,284,000	19,048,032	18,601,400
Beijing		China	East Asia	17,013,000	22,363,000	18,150,576	20,738,738
Bogotá		Colombia	South America	10,624,000	10,734,000	10,419,361	10,544,590
Buenos Aires		Argentina	South America	14,018,000	15,933,000	14,179,912	14,590,526
Cairo		Egypt	North Africa	25,566,000	22,684,000	25,230,325	27,925,433
Chaoshan (Note: The term is not used officially. Two sources list the area under Jieyang, another two under Shantou and one under Chaozhou.)		China	East Asia	6,804,000*	12,187,000	10,579,303	13,891,202
Chennai		India	South Asia	11,153,000	11,950,000	11,466,400	11,528,915
Chongqing		China	East Asia	7,071,000*	11,524,000	8,449,690*	8,913,804*
Delhi		India	South Asia	30,222,000	33,224,000	31,422,508	33,495,554
Dhaka		Bangladesh	South Asia	36,585,000	25,305,000	37,307,160	22,762,988
Guangzhou		China	East Asia	27,563,000	69,562,000	42,987,704	16,650,322
Hangzhou		China	East Asia	7,500,000*	12,422,000	6,387,064*	9,013,951*
Ho Chi Minh City		Vietnam	Southeast Asia	14,053,000	16,024,000	14,557,830	14,247,593
Hyderabad		India	South Asia	9,191,000*	10,101,000	9,455,230*	9,706,886*
Istanbul		Turkey	Europe West Asia	15,015,000	14,749,000	14,210,222	14,693,269
Jakarta		Indonesia	Southeast Asia	41,914,000	36,877,000	40,545,126	32,513,588
Johannesburg		South Africa	Southern Africa	7,077,000*	15,026,000	8,592,843*	9,497,036*
Karachi		Pakistan	South Asia	21,423,000	21,258,000	21,031,703	18,916,709
Kinshasa		DR Congo	Central Africa	10,944,000	13,060,000	12,945,683	10,077,694
Kolkata		India	South Asia	22,550,000	20,327,000	23,314,585	24,106,859
Lagos		Nigeria	West Africa	12,792,000	15,283,000	12,486,045	12,642,198
Lahore		Pakistan	South Asia	15,156,000	14,256,000	14,305,060	15,696,939
Lima		Peru	South America	10,580,000	10,914,000	10,828,104	10,496,389
London		United Kingdom	Europe	10,416,000	11,360,000	10,408,333	13,475,297
Los Angeles		United States	North America	12,740,000	15,582,000	13,474,333	16,206,529
Luanda		Angola	Central Africa	11,370,000	11,892,000	11,672,134	10,212,263
Metro Manila		Philippines	Southeast Asia	24,735,000	25,521,000	25,921,189	27,327,889
Mexico City		Mexico	North America	17,734,000	18,942,000	17,639,164	19,229,491
Moscow		Russia	Europe	14,525,000	18,509,000	14,384,082	17,217,606
Mumbai		India	South Asia	20,203,000	26,237,000	20,453,270	23,435,141
New York City		United States	North America	13,920,000	20,892,000	14,197,659	20,106,617
Osaka		Japan	East Asia	12,964,000	14,998,000	12,653,994	16,866,788
Paris		France	Europe	9,382,000*	11,282,000	9,328,385*	11,249,025
Rio de Janeiro		Brazil	South America	9,500,000*	12,546,000	9,853,693*	11,068,999
São Paulo		Brazil	South America	18,950,000	21,747,000	19,485,158	21,671,857
Seoul		South Korea	East Asia	22,490,000	23,825,000	22,261,692	25,199,125
Shanghai		China	East Asia	29,559,000	45,115,000	30,678,616	30,504,083
Shenzhen		China	East Asia	13,878,000	Combined with Guangzhou	Combined with Guangzhou	Combined with Guangzhou
Surabaya		Indonesia	Southeast Asia	6,844,000*	6,820,000*	6,856,993*	10,695,358
Suzhou		China	East Asia	7,731,000*	Combined with Shanghai	11,540,430	13,458,006
Taipei		Taiwan	East Asia	9,137,000*	9,866,000*	9,686,521*	10,048,037
Tehran		Iran	West Asia	9,175,000*	14,137,000	9,363,124*	13,563,316
Tianjin		China	East Asia	7,285,000*	12,095,000	7,330,648*	8,963,397*
Tokyo		Japan	East Asia	33,413,000	37,325,000	33,155,907	36,697,549
Wuhan		China	East Asia	7,364,000*	10,041,000	8,079,484*	8,947,812*

== History ==
=== Pre-industrial era ===
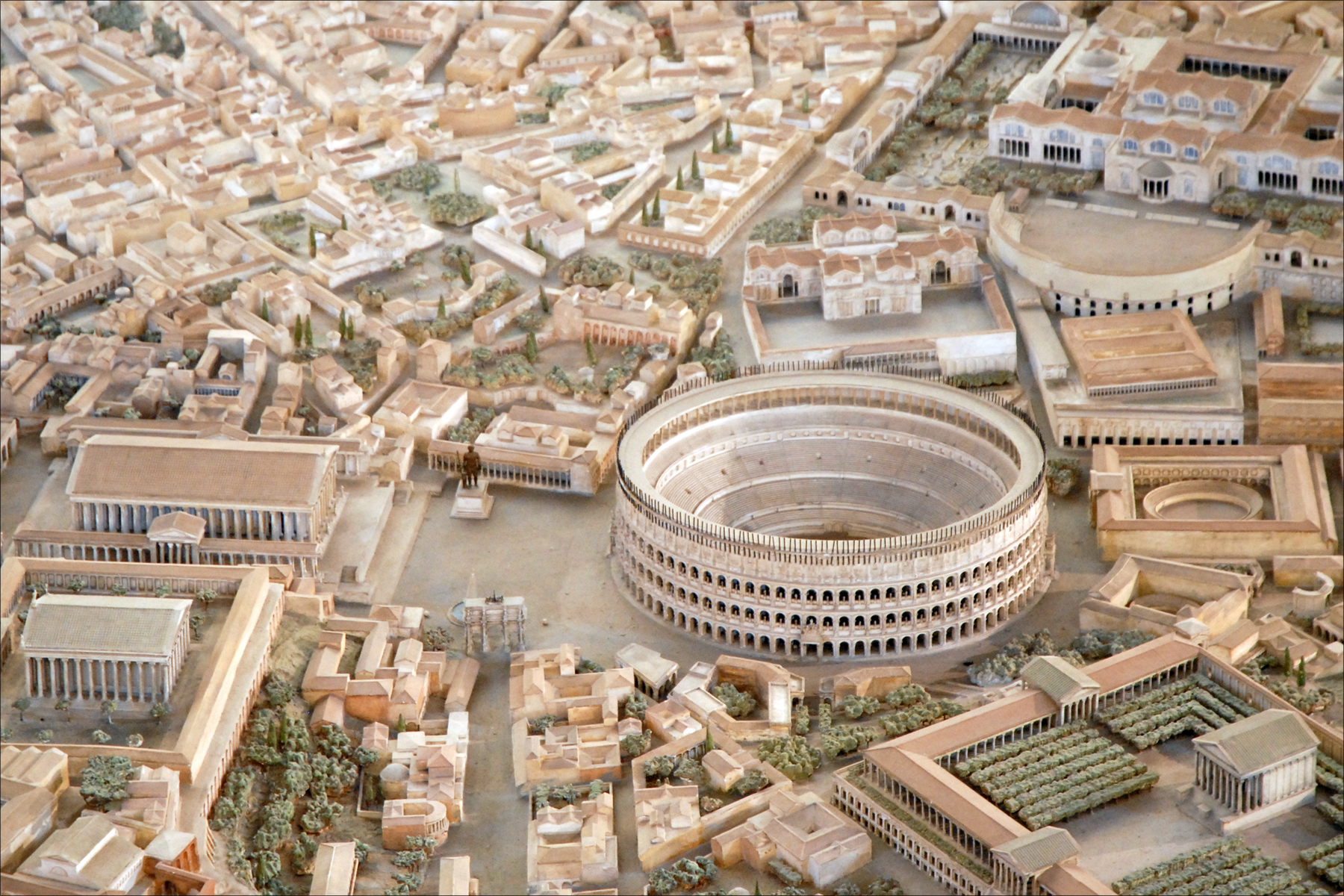
Gismondi's model of Rome in the time of Constantine

In the Antiquity era, for almost five hundred years, Rome was the largest, wealthiest, and most politically important city of the ancient world, ruling over Europe, Western Asia and Northern Africa. Population estimates of 750,000–1,000,000 people by the end of the 1st century BC are generally given by scholars; however, that would require population densities as high as 72,150 per square kilometre. If densities were similar to those in the well-preserved cities of Pompeii and Ostia, the population would be around 500,000. Rome's population started declining in 402 AD when Flavius Honorius, Western Roman Emperor from 395 to 423, moved the government to Ravenna and Rome's population declined to a mere 20,000 during the Early Middle Ages, reducing the sprawling city to groups of inhabited buildings interspersed among large areas of ruins and vegetation.

Baghdad was likely the largest city in the world from shortly after its foundation in 762 AD until the 930s, with some estimates putting its population at over one million. Chinese capital cities Chang'an and Kaifeng also experienced huge population booms during prosperous empires. According to the census in the year 742 recorded in the New Book of Tang, 362,921 families with 1,960,188 persons were counted in Jingzhao Fu (京兆府), the metropolitan area including small cities in the vicinity of Chang'an. The medieval settlement surrounding Angkor, the one-time capital of the Khmer Empire which flourished between the 9th and 15th centuries, could have supported a population of up to one million people.

=== Formation of megacities ===
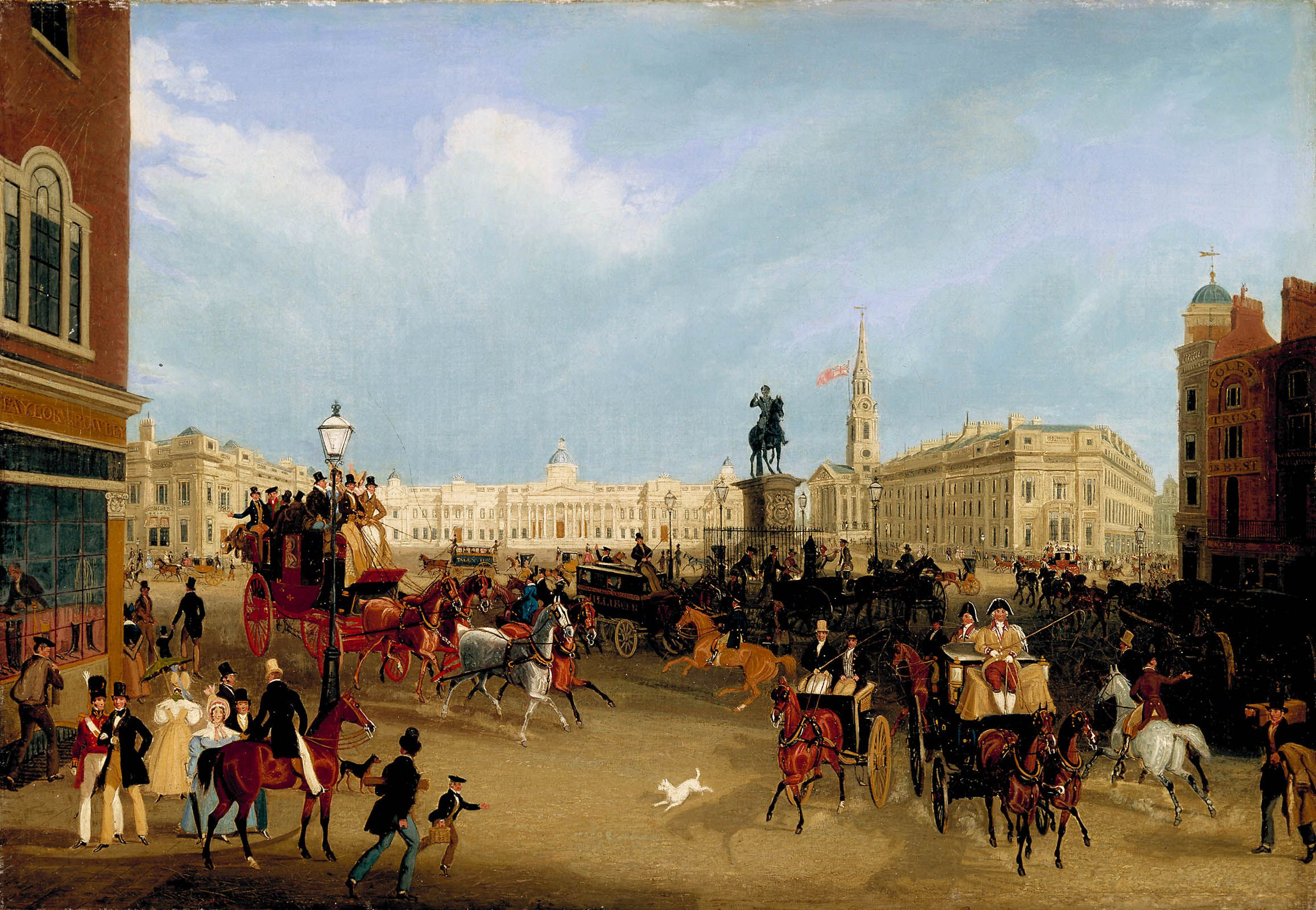
During the nineteenth century, London became into the world's largest city and capital of the British Empire.

In 1800, only 3% of the world's population lived in cities, a figure that rose to 47% by the end of the twentieth century. The term "megacity" entered common use in the late 19th or early 20th centuries; one of the earliest documented uses of the term was by the University of Texas in 1904. Initially, the United Nations used the term to describe cities of 8 million or more inhabitants, but now uses the threshold of 10 million. In the mid-1970s, the term was coined by urbanist Janice Perlman referring to the phenomenon of very large urban agglomerations.

From around 1825 to 1918, London was the largest city in the world, with the population growing rapidly; it was the first city to reach a population of over 5 million in 1900. In 1950, New York City was the only urban area with a population of over 10 million. This increase has happened as the world's population moves towards the high (75–85%) urbanization levels of North America and Western Europe.

Since the 2000s, the largest megacity has been the Greater Tokyo Area. The population of this urban agglomeration includes areas such as Yokohama and Kawasaki, and is estimated to be between 37 and 38 million. This variation in estimates can be accounted for by different definitions of what the area encompasses. While the prefectures of Tokyo, Chiba, Kanagawa, and Saitama are commonly included in statistical information, the Japan Statistics Bureau only includes the area within 50 kilometers of the Tokyo Metropolitan Government Offices in Shinjuku, thus arriving at a smaller population estimate.

A characteristic issue of megacities is the difficulty in defining their outer limits and accurately estimating the populations. To correct for this an Urban Metric System was proposed, including measurement of Paropolis, that has tantamount calculation values to megacities. It has been applied limitedly, for example by Canada in cases since 2018. Another list defines megacities as urban agglomerations instead of metropolitan areas.

=== Growth ===
Among the 27 megacities with populations over 10 million globally in 2007, 15 were situated in Asia. The top eight provincial capital cities in China with urban areas exceeding 400 km^{2}—Beijing, Shanghai, Tianjin, Guangzhou, Chongqing, Hangzhou, Wuhan, and Xi'an—accounted for 54.8% of the total urban area of all provincial capital cities in the country in 2015. Other sources list Nagoya the Rhine-Ruhr metropolitan region as megacities.

In 2010, UN forecasted that urban population of 3.2 billion would rise to nearly 5 billion by 2030, when three out of five, or 60%, of people would live in cities. This increase will be most dramatic on the least-urbanized continents, Asia and Africa. By 2025, Asia's growth alone modeled having at least 30 megacities.

Surveys and projections indicate that all urban growth over the next 25 years will be in developing countries. One billion people, almost one-seventh of the world's population, now live in shanty towns. In many poor countries, overcrowded slums exhibit high rates of disease due to unsanitary conditions, malnutrition, and lack of basic health care. By 2030, over 2 billion people in the world will be living in slums. Over 90% of the urban population of Ethiopia, Malawi and Uganda, three of the world's most rural countries, already live in slums.

Since 2025, Jakarta has surpassed Tokyo to be the largest megacity in the world.

== Challenges ==
=== Slums ===
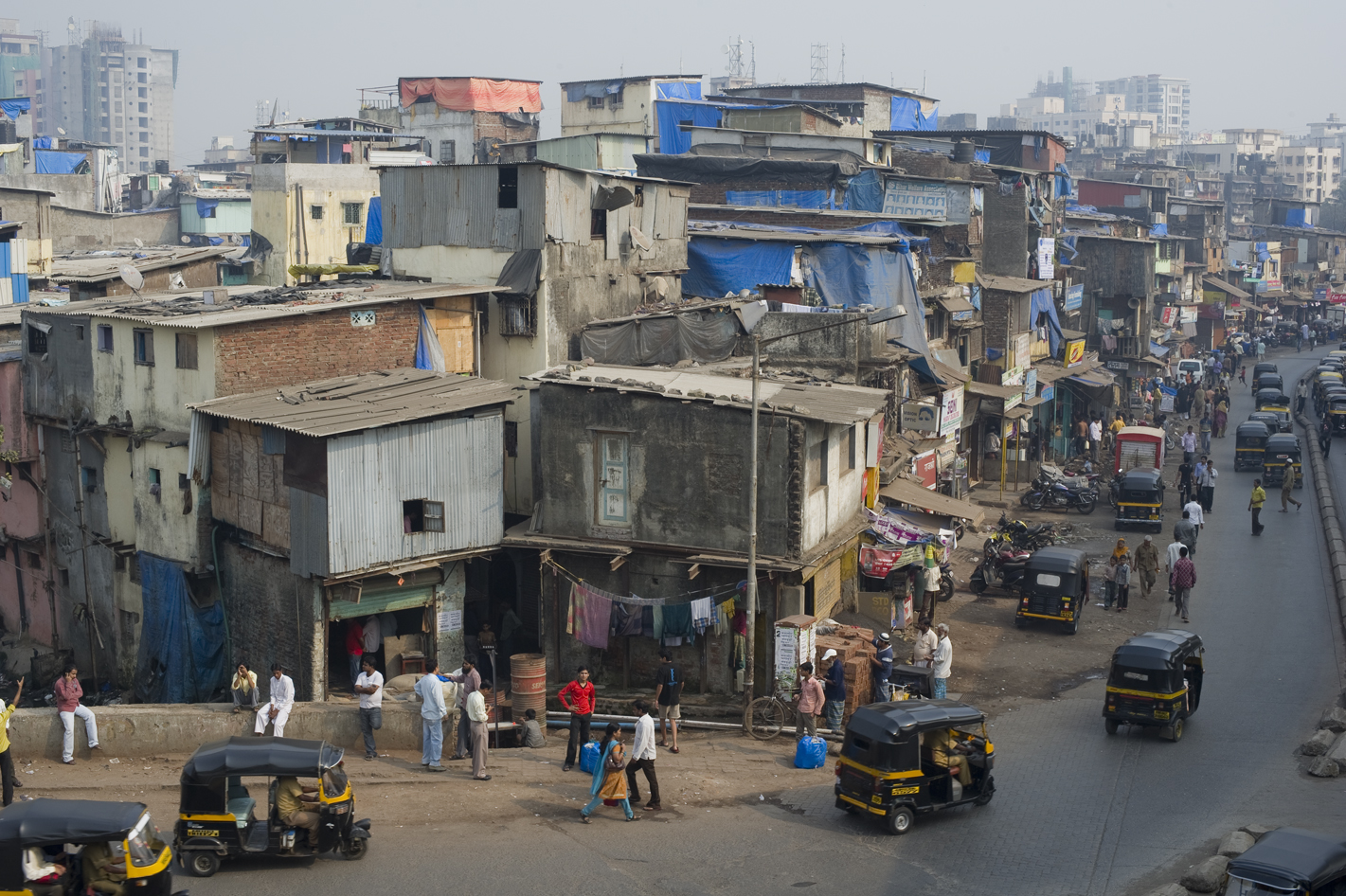
Mumbai's Dharavi slum is home to 1 million residents.

According to the United Nations, the proportion of urban dwellers living in slums or informal settlements decreased from 47 percent to 37 percent in the developing world between 1990 and 2005. However, due to rising population, the absolute number of slum dwellers is rising and passed 1 billion in 2018. The increase in informal settlement population has been caused by massive migration, both internal and transnational, into cities, which has caused growth rates of urban populations and spatial concentrations not seen before in history. The majority of these are located in informal settlements which often lack sufficient quality housing, sanitation, drainage, water access, and officially recognized addresses. These issues raise problems in the political, social, and economic arenas. People who live in slums or informal settlements often have minimal or no access to education, healthcare, or the urban economy.

=== Crime ===
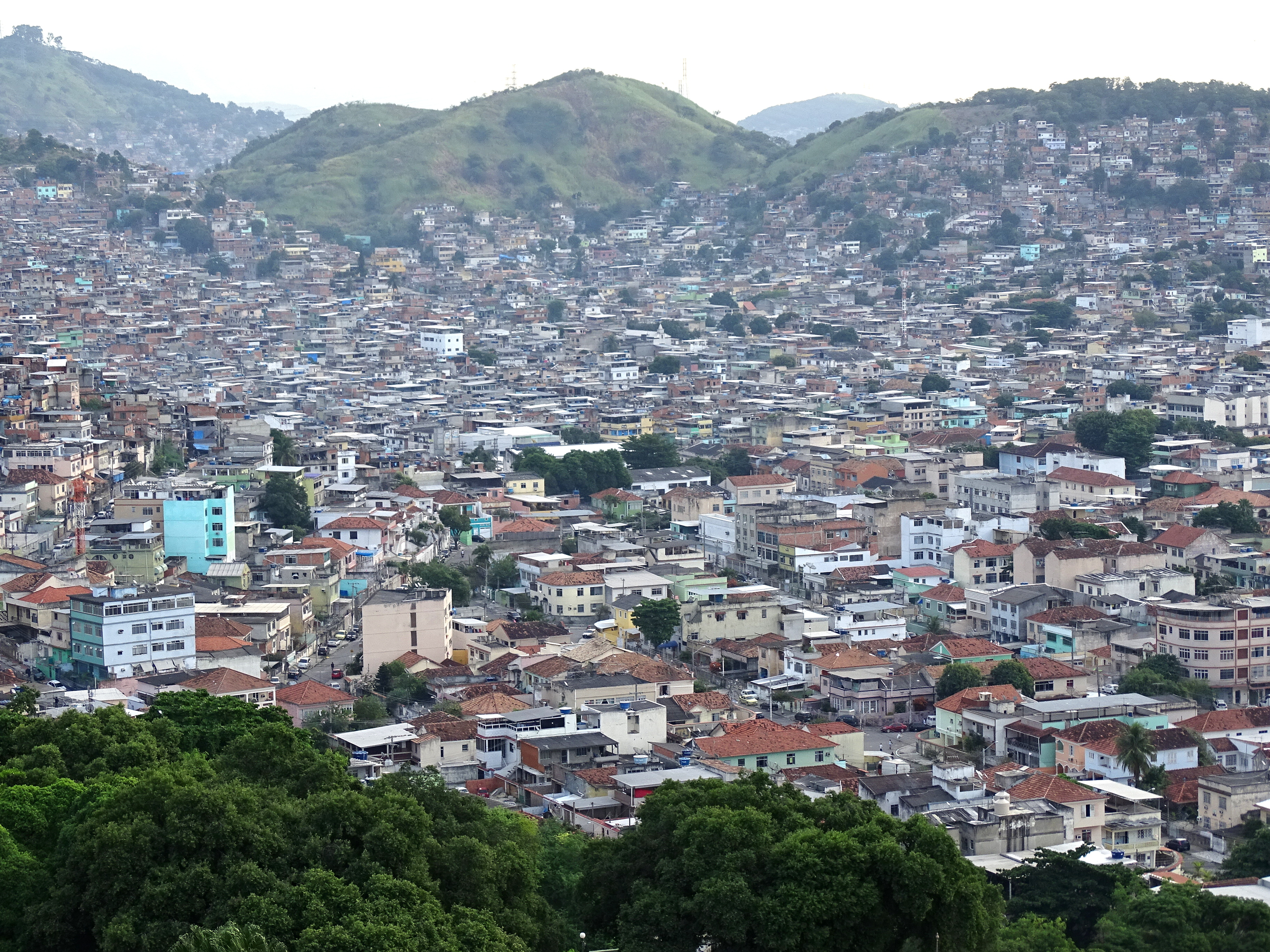
Most murders in Rio de Janeiro, Brazil, are gang-related and happen in the favelas.

As with any large concentration of people, there is usually crime. High population densities often result in higher crime rates, as visibly seen in growing megacities such as Karachi, Delhi, Cairo, Rio de Janeiro, and Lagos.

=== Homelessness ===
Megacities often have significant numbers of homeless people. The actual legal definition of homelessness varies from country to country, or among different entities or institutions in the same country or region.

In 2002, research showed that children and families were the largest growing segment of the homeless population in the United States, and this has presented new challenges, especially in services, to agencies. In the US, the government asked many major cities to come up with a ten-year plan to end homelessness. One of the results of this was a "Housing first" solution, rather than to have a homeless person remain in an emergency homeless shelter it was thought to be better to quickly get the person permanent housing of some sort and the necessary support services to sustain a new home. But there are many complications with this kind of program and these must be dealt with to make such an initiative work successfully in the middle to long term.

=== Traffic congestion ===
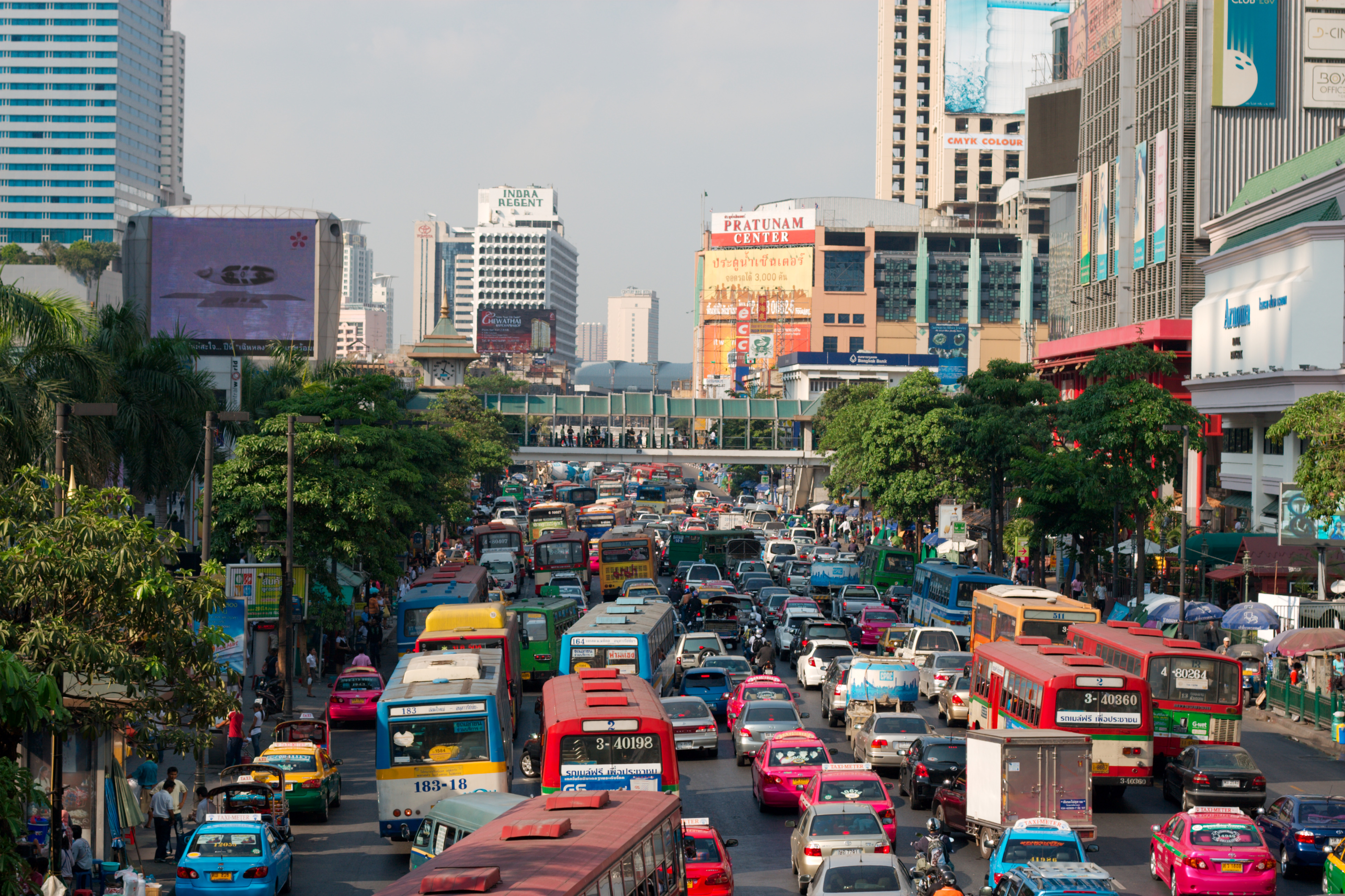
Bangkok is notorious for its traffic congestion.

Traffic congestion is a condition on road networks that occurs as use increases, and is characterized by slower speeds, longer trip times, increased pollution, and increased vehicular queueing. The Texas Transportation Institute estimated that, in 2000, the 75 largest metropolitan areas experienced 3.6 billion vehicle-hours of delay, resulting in 5.7 billion U.S. gallons (21.6 billion liters) in wasted fuel and $67.5 billion in lost productivity, or about 0.7% of the nation's GDP. It also estimated that the annual cost of congestion for each driver was approximately $1,000 in very large cities and $200 in small cities. Traffic congestion is increasing in major cities and delays are becoming more frequent in smaller cities and rural areas. It also can result in various issues, including economic losses, energy waste, air and noise pollution, and more.

=== Urban sprawl ===
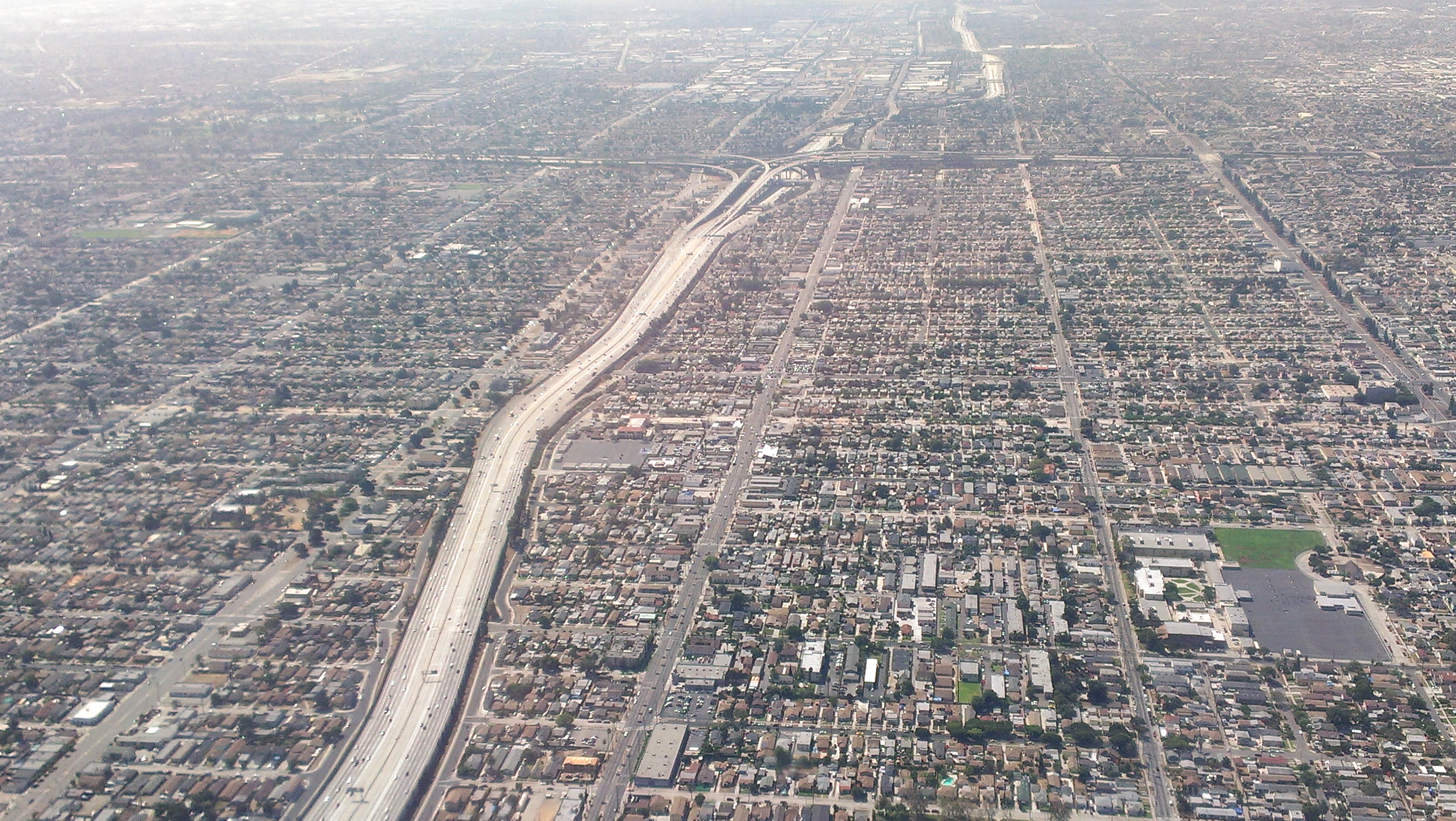
A flat land area in the Greater Los Angeles Area in the U.S. state of California with houses, buildings, roads, and freeways. Areas constructed to capacity contribute to urban expansion.

Urban sprawl, also known as suburban sprawl, is a multifaceted concept, which includes the spreading outwards of a city and its suburbs to its outskirts to low-density, auto-dependent development on rural land, with associated design features that encourage car dependency. As a result, some critics argue that sprawl has certain disadvantages including longer transport distances to work, high car dependence, inadequate facilities (e.g. health, cultural. etc.) and higher per-person infrastructure costs. Discussions and debates about sprawl are often obfuscated by the ambiguity associated with the phrase. For example, some commentators measure sprawl only with the average number of residential units per acre in a given area. But others associate it with decentralization (spread of population without a well-defined center), discontinuity (leapfrog development), segregation of uses, etc.

=== Gentrification ===
Gentrification and urban gentrification are terms for the socio-cultural changes in an area as a result of wealthier people buying property in a less prosperous community. As living costs rise, lower-income residents are forced to move out of the community leading to an increase in average income, which in turn makes the area more desirable to other wealthier property or business owners, further pushing the living costs up. This process also tends to lead to a decrease in average family size in the area. This type of population change reduces industrial land use when it is redeveloped for commerce and housing.

=== Air pollution ===
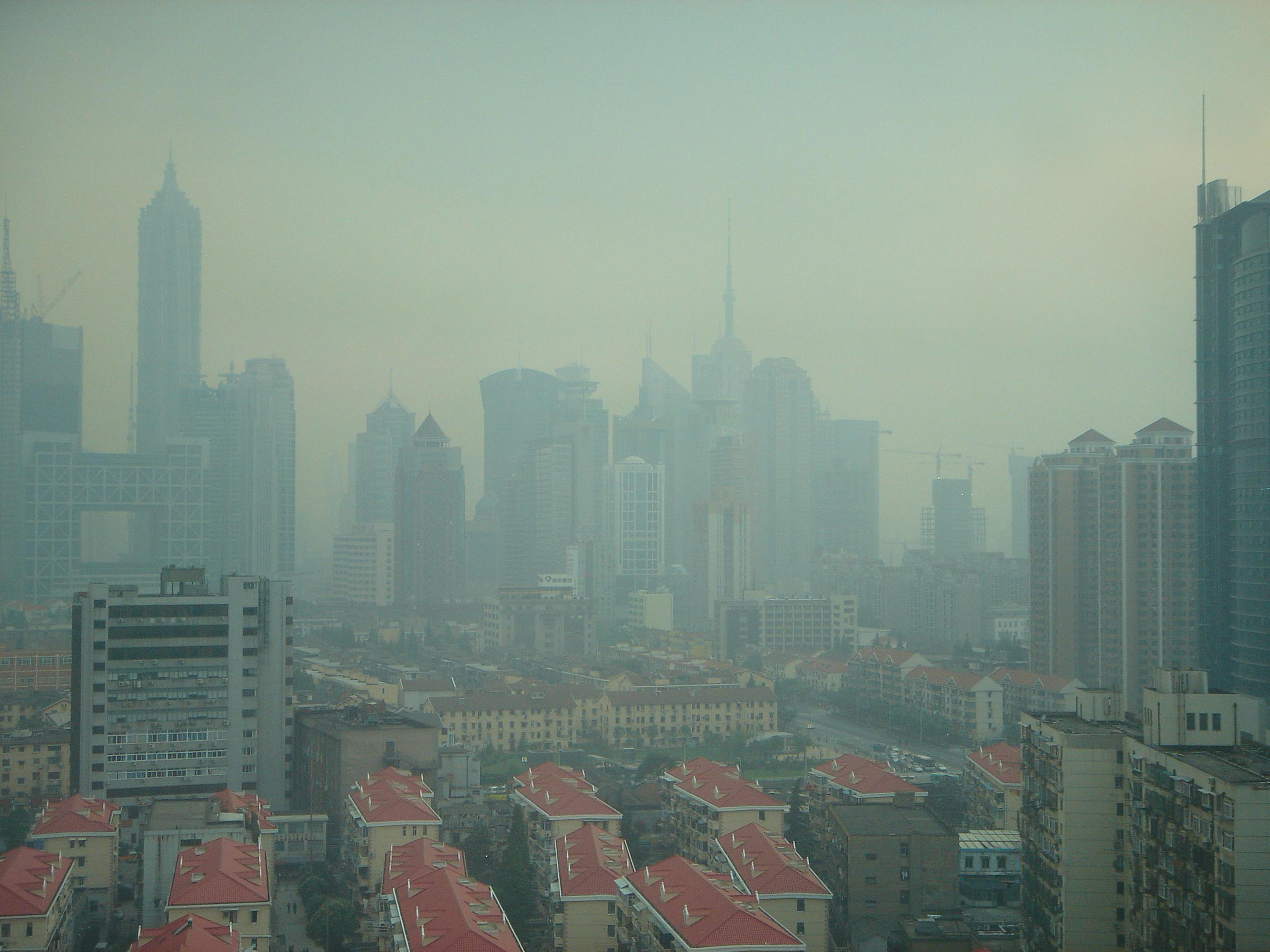
Air pollution in Shanghai, China

Air pollution is the introduction into the atmosphere of chemicals, particulate matter, or biological materials that cause harm or discomfort to humans or other living organisms, or damages the natural environment. This issue is particularly prevalent in developing nations. As part of the Global Environment Monitoring System, WHO and UNEP established an air pollution monitoring network that oversees 50 cities. Many urban areas have significant problems with smog, a type of air pollution derived from vehicle emissions from internal combustion engines and industrial fumes that react in the atmosphere with sunlight to form secondary pollutants that also combine with the primary emissions to form photochemical smog.

=== Climate change ===
Jakarta was listed as the most vulnerable city to climate change in a 2021 Verisk Maplecroft study.

Cities are one of the most vulnerable parts of the human society to the effects of climate change, and likely one of the most important solutions for reducing the environmental impact of humans. The UN projects that 68% of the world population will live in urban areas by 2050. In the year 2016, 31 mega-cities reported having at least 10 million in their population, 8 of which surpassed 20 million people. Cities have a significant influence on construction and transportation—two of the key contributors to global warming emissions. Moreover, because of processes that create climate conflict and climate refugees, city areas are expected to grow during the next several decades, stressing infrastructure and concentrating more impoverished peoples in cities.

High density and urban heat island effect are examples of weather changes that impact cities due to climate change. It also causes exacerbating existing problems such as air pollution, water scarcity, and heat illness in metropolitan areas. Moreover, because most cities have been built on rivers or coastal areas, cities are frequently vulnerable to the subsequent effects of sea level rise, which cause flooding and erosion; these effects are also connected with other urban environmental problems, such as subsidence and aquifer depletion.

=== Energy and material resources ===
The sheer size and complexity of megacities gives rise to enormous social and environmental challenges. Whether megacities can develop sustainably depends to a large extent on how they obtain, share, and manage their energy and material resources. There are correlations between electricity consumption, heating and industrial fuel use, ground transportation energy use, water consumption, waste generation, and steel production in terms of level of consumption and how efficiently they use resources.

== In fiction ==
Megacities are a common backdrop in dystopian science fiction, with examples such as the Sprawl in William Gibson's Neuromancer, and Mega-City One, a megalopolis of between 50 and 800 million people (fluctuations due to war and disaster) across the east coast of the United States, in the Judge Dredd comic. In Demolition Man, a megacity called "San Angeles" was formed from the joining of Los Angeles, Santa Barbara, San Diego, and the surrounding metropolitan regions following a massive earthquake in 2010. Fictional planet-wide megacities (ecumenopoleis) include Trantor in Isaac Asimov's Foundation series of books and Coruscant (population two trillion) in the Star Wars universe.

== See also ==
- Economies of agglomeration
- Global city
- List of largest cities
- List of largest cities throughout history
- Megalopolis
- Urban sprawl
