= Demolition Man (film) =

1993 film by Marco Brambilla

- Theatrical release poster
- Directed by: Marco Brambilla
- Screenplay by: Daniel Waters; Robert Reneau; Peter M. Lenkov
- Story by: Peter M. Lenkov; Robert Reneau
- Produced by: Joel Silver; Michael Levy; Howard Kazanjian
- Starring: Sylvester Stallone; Wesley Snipes; Sandra Bullock; Nigel Hawthorne
- Cinematography: Alex Thomson
- Edited by: Stuart Baird
- Music by: Elliot Goldenthal
- Production company: Silver Pictures
- Distributed by: Warner Bros.
- Release date: October 8, 1993
- Running time: 115 minutes
- Country: United States
- Budget: $45–77 million
- Box office: $159 million

Demolition Man is a 1993 American science fiction action film directed by Marco Brambilla in his directorial debut. It stars Sylvester Stallone, Wesley Snipes, Sandra Bullock and Nigel Hawthorne. Stallone plays John Spartan, a risk-taking police officer with a reputation for causing destruction. After a disastrous attempt to rescue hostages from evil crime lord Simon Phoenix (Snipes), both are sentenced and cryogenically frozen in 1996. In 2032, Phoenix escapes and the authorities awaken Spartan to help capture him. The story makes allusions to many other works, including Aldous Huxley's 1932 dystopian novel Brave New World and H. G. Wells's The Sleeper Awakes.

The film was released in the United States on October 8, 1993, to mixed reviews from critics. It earned $159 million worldwide, and was considered a successful film for Stallone.

== Plot ==
In 1996 Los Angeles, psychopathic criminal Simon Phoenix kidnaps a busload of passengers. Police officer John Spartan, nicknamed "The Demolition Man" for the collateral damage he often causes in apprehending suspects, mounts an unauthorized assault to capture Phoenix. When a thermal scan of the area reveals no trace of the hostages, he raids the building and confronts Phoenix, who sets off explosives to destroy everything. The hostages' corpses are found in the rubble and Phoenix claims that Spartan knew about them but attacked anyway. Both men are sentenced to lengthy prison terms in the California Cryo-Penitentiary, in which convicts are cryogenically frozen and undergo subliminal rehabilitation techniques.

In 2032, the city of San Angeles – a megalopolis formed from the merger of Los Angeles, San Diego, and Santa Barbara after a massive earthquake – is a seemingly peaceful utopia, designed and run by Dr. Raymond Cocteau. Phoenix is thawed for a parole hearing but escapes using skills he did not have before. Discovering that he can hack into the city's computer networks, Phoenix taunts and easily overpowers several police officers who attempt to stop him, to the disbelief of officers watching remotely from their headquarters.

Lieutenant Lenina Huxley, an idealistic officer fascinated by 20th-century culture, learns about Spartan's career from veteran officer Zachary Lamb. He suggests that Spartan is their best chance to stop Phoenix, as someone with the experience and mindset to anticipate his actions. Huxley persuades her superior to parole and reinstate Spartan. Spartan finds life in San Angeles to be sterile and oppressive, since all types of behavior deemed immoral or unhealthy have been declared illegal.

Anticipating that Phoenix will attempt to secure firearms, Spartan has Huxley lead him to a museum, where he finds Phoenix looting a weapons exhibit. Phoenix escapes, unexpectedly encounters Cocteau, aims a gun at him, but freezes, unable to kill him. Cocteau orders Phoenix to kill Edgar Friendly, the leader of the Scraps, a resistance society that lives underground. Spartan arrives to find Cocteau unharmed and ponders why Phoenix would spare his life.

In gratitude for being "saved", Cocteau invites Spartan and Huxley to a formal dinner at Taco Bell. Spartan notices the Scraps' approach during the dinner and interrupts their attempt to steal food but begins to sympathize with them. Acting on a hunch, Spartan has Huxley investigate Phoenix's rehabilitation program and finds that he has been given technological and combat skills to make him even more dangerous than he was in 1996.

During a private meeting, Cocteau expresses his displeasure with Phoenix over the lack of progress in handling Friendly, threatening to return him to the cryo-prison if he fails his mission. Phoenix persuades Cocteau to release additional cryo-prisoners, then leads them underground to assassinate Friendly, only to find Spartan and Huxley already there. They thwart the attempt on Friendly's life, and Phoenix tauntingly reveals to Spartan that he framed him for the deaths of the 1996 hostages; they were dead long before the building exploded. Afterward, as Phoenix escapes to meet Cocteau, Spartan borrows weapons from the Scraps and pursues him.

Pleased with Phoenix's improved terror campaign, Cocteau boasts of his intention to tighten his control over San Angeles. Phoenix, still unable to kill Cocteau, has a gang member kill him instead, then kills his own gang, and begins the process of thawing out the cryo-prison's most dangerous convicts. Spartan incapacitates Huxley for her safety, then takes out Phoenix's gang. He battles Phoenix and kills him by freezing him solid and the uncontrolled freezing triggers an explosion that destroys the prison.

The police fear that the loss of the prison and Cocteau's control will end society as they know it. Spartan urges them and the Scraps to work together, combining both the best aspects of order with personal freedom. Huxley and Spartan kiss, then depart together.

== Cast ==
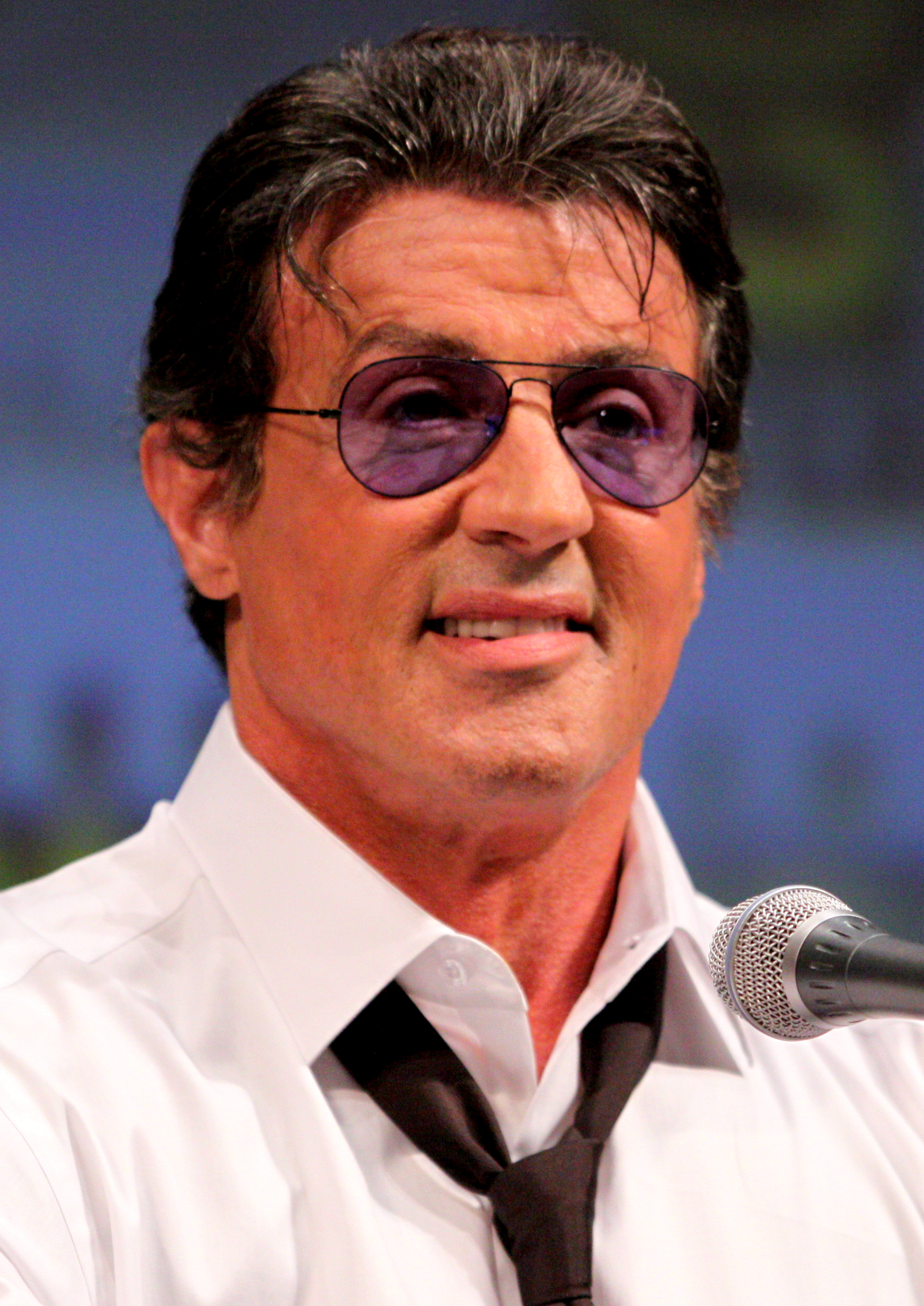
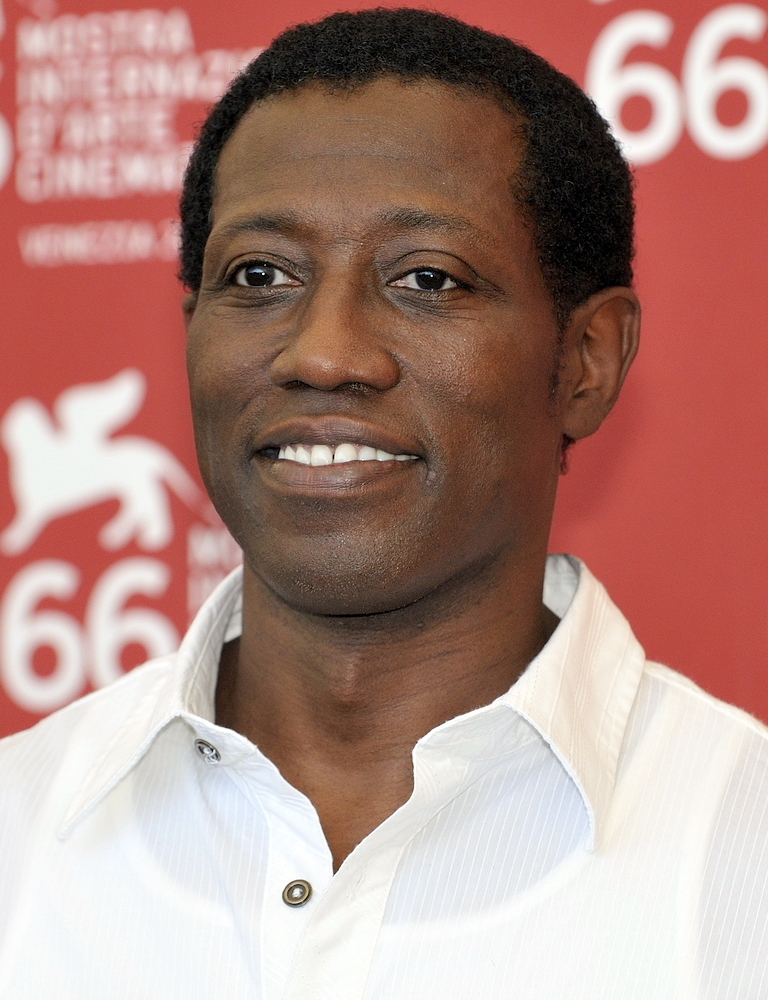
Sylvester Stallone (left, pictured in 2010) and Wesley Snipes (2009)
- Sylvester Stallone as John Spartan
- Wesley Snipes as Simon Phoenix
- Sandra Bullock as Lenina Huxley. The character was named after Aldous Huxley, the author of Brave New World, and Lenina Crowne, a central character in the novel.
- Nigel Hawthorne as Dr. Raymond Cocteau
- Benjamin Bratt as Alfredo Garcia
- Denis Leary as Edgar Friendly
- Bill Cobbs as Zachary Lamb
  - Grand L. Bush as Young Zachary Lamb
- Bob Gunton as Chief George Earle
- Glenn Shadix as Associate Bob
- Trent Walker as Boggle Guard
- Troy Evans as James MacMillan
- Steve Kahan as Captain Healy
- Andre Gregory as Warden William Smithers
  - Mark Colson as Young William Smithers
- Toshishiro Obata as Kodo, CryoCon Ally
- Ben Jurand as Francis, CryoCon Ally
- Billy D. Lucas as Danzig, CryoCon Ally
- Rhino Michaels as Elvin, Cryocon Ally
- Jesse Ventura as Adam, Cryocon Ally
- Brandy Ledford as Wrong Number Video Girl
- Dan Cortese as Taco Bell Lounge singer and a Cryo Prison guard
- Jack Black as Wasteland Scrap #2
- Carlton Wilborn as Wasteland Scrap Carl
- Rob Schneider as Officer Erwin (uncredited)
- David Patrick Kelly as Leon (uncredited)

== Production ==
=== Development ===
The original script was written by Peter Lenkov, who retained a story by credit. Lenkov came to Hollywood straight out of college with no connections, and wrote seven different scripts, desperately hoping to break into filmmaking. Selling the spec script of Demolition Man to Warner Bros. was his first big break. Lenkov had been inspired by Lethal Weapon and wanted to do something about cops. He was also influenced by stories of celebrities being cryogenically frozen and listening to Sting's song "Demolition Man" on repeat due to a broken cassette player in his car. His initial pitch was rejected by an executive who did not understand his "frozen cop" idea. The finished script, where a super cop has to battle the world's deadliest criminal, in a future where there is almost no crime, generated more interest.

Writer Daniel Waters (known for Heathers) said his version of the screenplay was essentially a rewrite; he changed the script so extensively that when the script went to arbitration he received first screenplay writing credit. In the early drafts the script was a regular action movie, with no attempt at comedy. Waters pitched it as an action movie version of Woody Allen's Sleeper. Waters had an idea about a small part of Universal City, a shopping and entertainment area called CityWalk, and wondered what it might be like if one day all of Los Angeles might be like that, and the idea grew from there. Waters says his intention was to have fun, that he was not trying to be political or deeply examine political correctness. He cited the conclusion of the film, where society will need to find a new balance and compromise, as representing his own position in the political middle ground. Burger King was originally written as the winner of the franchise wars but they were not interested in being part of the film. McDonald's also declined to be involved. Taco Bell welcomed the opportunity. The "three seashells" concept originated when Waters was trying to come up with ideas for a futuristic restroom and called writer Larry Karaszewski for suggestions and he happened to be using the restroom when he answered the call. He looked around his bathroom and said he had a bag of seashells on the toilet as decorations, so Waters decide to use that. A joke was cut from the script, where after using the three seashells and washing his hands, Spartan was confronted by the same ineffective hand dryer from his own time. Waters wrote some of the script on index cards while waiting in line for Johnny Carson tickets. He said it was some of the fastest work he'd ever written and that he had only worked on it for two and a half weeks.

The film began with Spartan being taken out of cryogenic freeze in the future of 2032, until Fred Dekker did uncredited rewrites on the script, adding the Los Angeles 1996 prologue, to showcase Spartan and Simon Phoenix in their natural environment and make the differences of the future more striking. Dekker explained "If you don't show Kansas, Oz isn't all that special." Jonathan Lemkin also did uncredited rewrites on the film. Steven de Souza read the script but was unavailable to commit to rewrites. De Souza recommended setting the film in the more distant future to make the culture clash more plausible. Producers rejected his suggestion because they wanted to keep the subplot of Spartan finding his daughter Kate but ultimately that subplot was cut from the film. The script had been in development for six years before filming finally began.

Director Marco Brambilla had a background in shooting big-budget TV commercials and this was his first feature film. Brambilla was working to make Richie Rich, starring Macaulay Culkin, but they could not get the budget they needed. Instead David Fincher recommended Brambilla to producer Joel Silver as director for Demolition Man. Steven Seagal had originally been attached as leading actor and Jean-Claude Van Damme had been offered the part of the villain Phoenix. Brambilla met Sylvester Stallone a few days after getting attached to the project and started re-writing the script with Daniel Waters. The film went into production approximately eight months after that. Silver was able to get highly experienced crew for the film, including editor Stuart Baird and cinematographer Alex Thomson. Brambilla brought costumer Bob Ringwood to the project because of his work on Dune (1984) and wanted Thomson because of his work on Alien 3 (1992).

=== Casting ===
Stallone passed on the project at first, but came back around to it. He liked the idea of two equal opponents in Spartan and Phoenix and decided to take a chance on doing something he had not done before. Stallone wanted Jackie Chan for the role of Phoenix. Chan turned it down, not wanting to play a villain. Wesley Snipes turned down the role several times, so Joel Silver and Marco Brambilla went to the set of the film Rising Sun to try and convince him in person. Brambilla explained what he thought the film could be and his passion for the script they were writing, and the next day they received a call and Snipes agreed to do the film. Brambilla said of Snipes, "He works without rehearsing too much, and he improvises a lot. The two of them, that combination of energies and the way they interact, really did the movie a lot of favors. They completely respected each other and were really professional, and they did get along. There was no ego or any competition between the actors." Lori Petty was originally cast as Lenina Huxley but was fired after two days of filming due to what Silver called "creative differences". Petty attributed it to personality differences, as she and Stallone did not get along, and said "Sly and I were like oil and water." Silver was looking for a replacement and Lorenzo di Bonaventura recommended Sandra Bullock; impressed by her audition tape, Silver hired her. Denis Leary said he was hired for his comedy rants, which he wrote himself and had to undergo a long approval process by the studio before they were included in the script. Nigel Hawthorne took the role of Dr. Raymond Cocteau to raise his profile, as he was primarily known as a television and stage actor. Having missed out on the lead role in Shadowlands to Anthony Hopkins, he wanted to make sure he was chosen for the film adaptation of The Madness of King George.

=== Filming ===
General Motors provided the production team with 18 concept vehicles, including the Ultralite. More than 20 fiberglass replicas of the Ultralite were produced to portray civilian and SAPD patrol vehicles in the film. After filming had completed, the remaining Ultralites were returned to Michigan as part of GM's concept vehicle fleet.

Brambilla did not want the cryogenic freezing to resemble gently falling asleep and instead wanted it to seem violent and scary. To achieve the effect Stallone stood in a clear plastic tank filled at first with glycerin, a thick viscous clear fluid. Later shots used water and Stallone had to hold his breath and try to pose underwater. Computer graphics were used to add the flash that quick-freezes Spartan. A dummy encased in clear plastic was built to represent the frozen version of Spartan. Stallone insisted that the model be anatomically complete. Later duplicates were made and were put on display in Planet Hollywood restaurants.

The City of Los Angeles allowed the filmmakers to use and demolish an old Department of Water & Power building in Downtown Los Angeles. This enabled them to have more control over the explosion, instead of having to cut straight to the building being gone and rubble as they had been forced to do with other projects. "We actually created a crater in the middle of the building. And have the explosion and rubble more designed, so to speak. It's fun to do that, because those big pyrotechnics always look great", Silver noted.

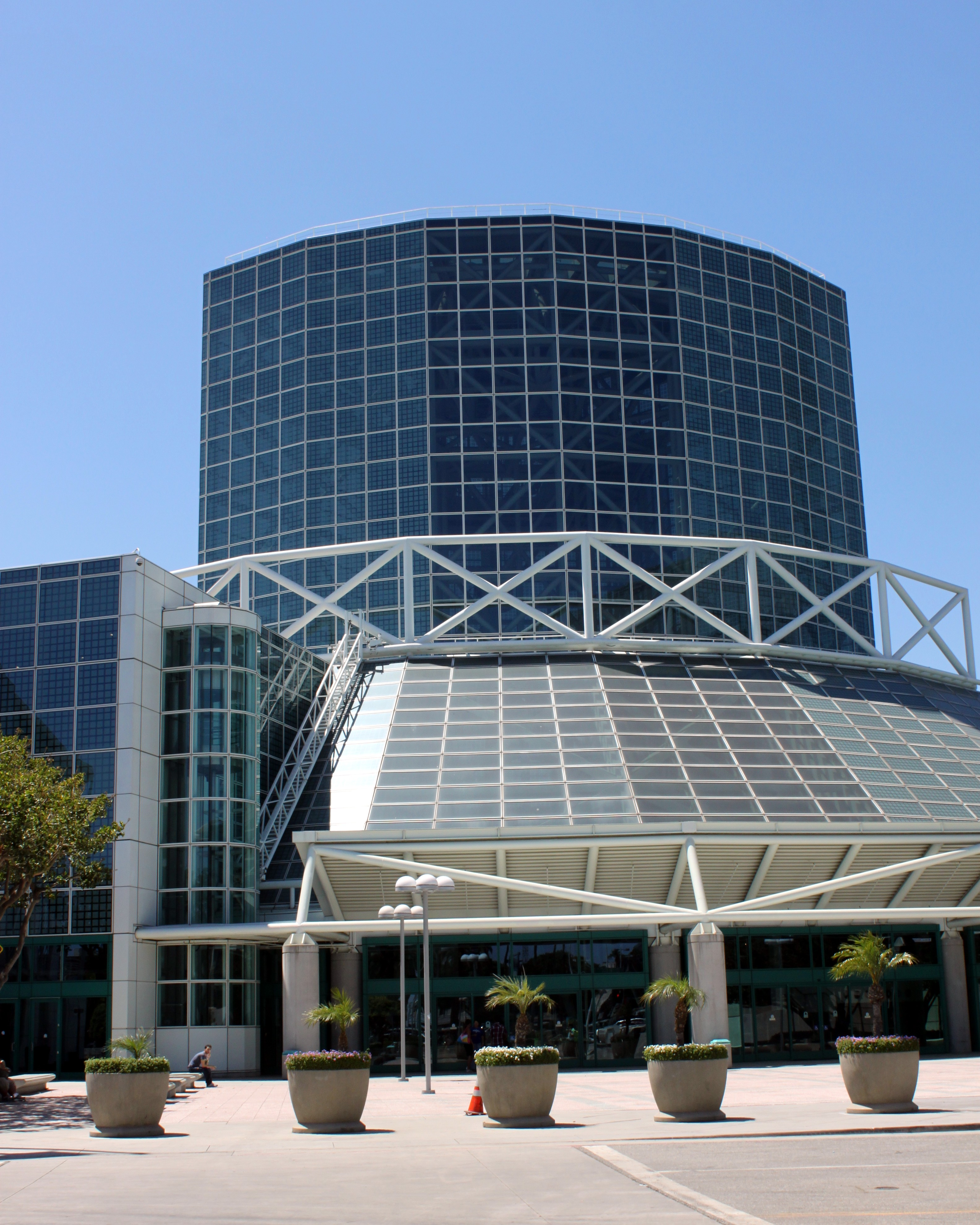
The Los Angeles Convention Center was used as the exterior of the Cocteau Center.

The film suffered repeated delays and the original 72-day production schedule ran to 112 days. Stallone was out for a week due to injury. Heavy rains in Los Angeles delayed filming. A soundstage was also damaged in a fire. The production went through five assistant directors and many crew had to leave to work on other projects. Insiders at Warner Bros. were critical of Silver for hiring a director without previous feature film experience. Silver rejected this view, saying, "Marco's done a brilliant job. We're over-schedule because this is a very hard movie to make, not because Marco is inexperienced."

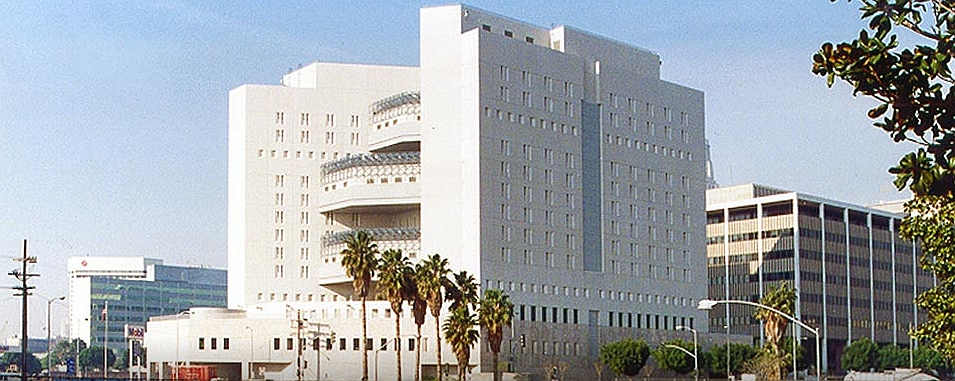
The cryo-prison was set in the Metro Detention Center in downtown Los Angeles.

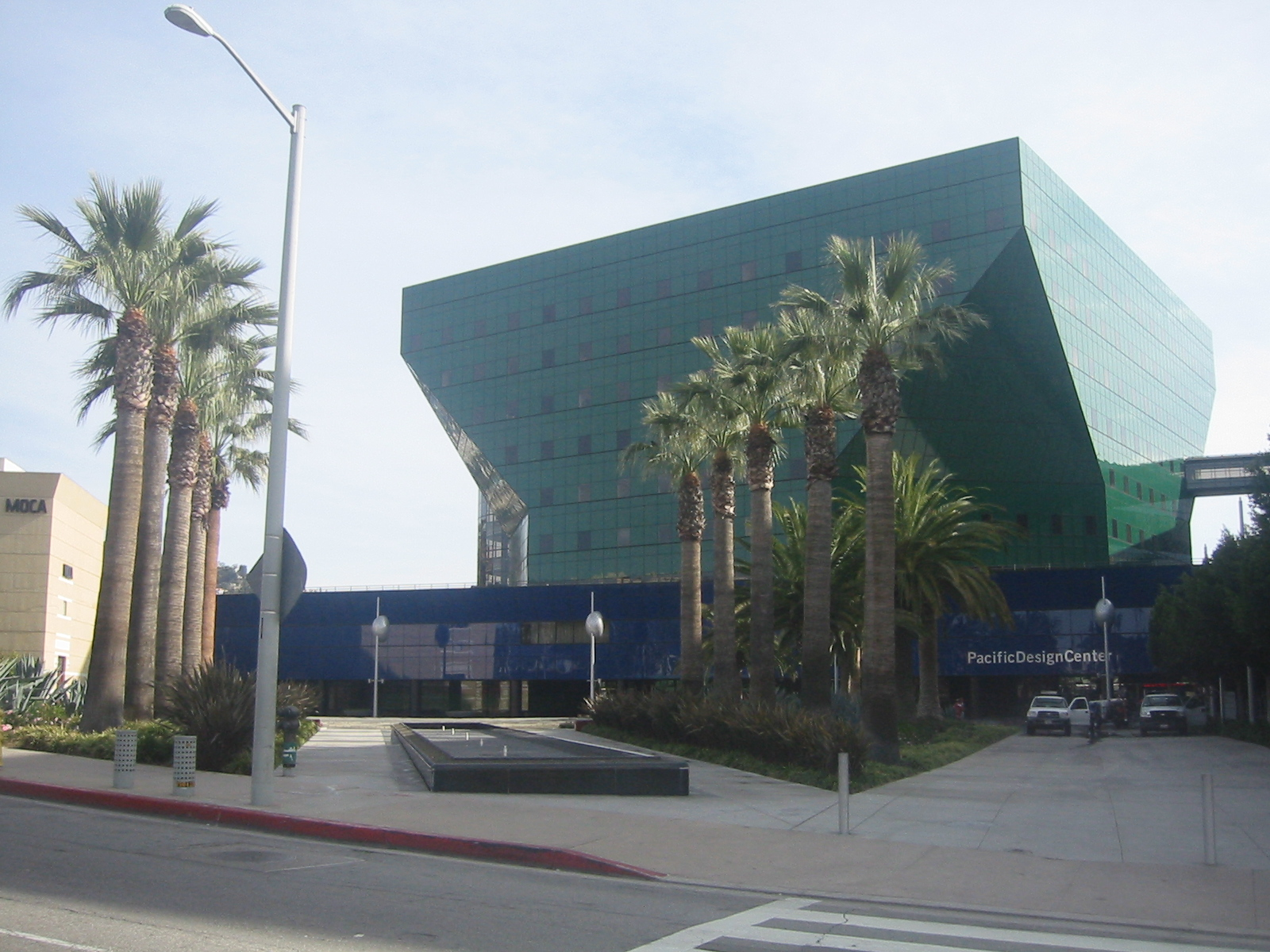
The Pacific Design Center was used as Sunrise Court, Lenina Huxley's apartment building.

Demolition Man was the first production to film at the Los Angeles Convention Center after it was rebuilt in the 1990s; it was used as the Cocteau Center. San Angeles was filmed in Orange County, California. Several locations in Irvine and San Diego were also used. The SAPD police station in the background was the GTE Corporate Headquarters in Westlake Village, California (which later became the Baxter Healthcare building. The Pacific Design Center in West Hollywood was used for the exterior shot of Lenina Huxley's apartment building. The cryo-prison used the exterior of the Metropolitan Detention Center in Downtown Los Angeles. Filming also took place at Wilshire Courtyard, 5700 and 5750 Wilshire Boulevard. A power station in Eagle Rock, Los Angeles, was used as the underground dwellings of Edgar Friendly (Leary) and the Scraps.

The helicopter bungee jump at the start of the film was coordinated by Charles Picerni, and performed by stuntman Ken Bates. For safety, and due to the danger of recoil back into the helicopter blades, a decelerator was used instead of a real bungee, and Bates jumped 300 feet (91 m) from a Chinook helicopter. According to Picerni it was a first: "We've done that off of buildings before, but never out of a helicopter."

The film mentions Arnold Schwarzenegger having served as President of the United States, after a Constitutional amendment was passed allowing him to run for the office due to his popularity. Coincidentally, a day short of ten years after the film's release, the 2003 California gubernatorial recall election was scheduled. The election saw Schwarzenegger actually begin a political career as the 38th Governor of California from 2003 until 2011. Shortly after he was elected, an "Arnold Amendment" did get proposed.

=== Post-Production ===
One of the film's focal points is Taco Bell being the sole surviving restaurant chain after "the franchise wars". The European version of the film substitutes Taco Bell with Pizza Hut, because Taco Bell is not as well known outside the United States and Canada; both restaurant chains were owned at the time by PepsiCo. Lines were re-dubbed and logos changed during post-production. According to The Wall Street Journal, this kind of localization of product placement was a first.

The film was green-lit with a production budget of $45 million. The cost increased to $77 million after the shooting schedule was extended. The combined cost of production and marketing was estimated at nearly $97 million.

A subplot involving Spartan's daughter Kate was cut for pacing reasons. This led to some confusion at test screenings, where audiences thought Lenina was his daughter and reacted negatively to the scene where they were about to have sex. Originally Kate was one of the Scraps living underground with Edgar Friendly's resistance. A scene where Spartan fights Adam (Jesse Ventura) was cut from the film.

== Marketing ==
MTV held a competition and demolition event to promote the film, with MTV Sports presenter Dan Cortese as host, and stars from the film in attendance. The Belknap Hardware and Manufacturing Company building in Louisville, Kentucky was imploded.

== Music ==
Elliot Goldenthal composed the score for the film. It was his second big Hollywood project after the Alien 3 score. The two commercial jingles, which are not part of the soundtrack, include the jingle from the 1967 commercial "Armour Hot Dogs" sung by Lenina (Bullock) and Alfredo Garcia (Benjamin Bratt) in the police car and the jingle from the 1960s commercial "Jolly Green Giant" sung by Dan Cortese in the Taco Bell restaurant. The theme song "Love Boat" of the series of the same name, which is also not part of the soundtrack, was played by Lenina as romantic background music in her apartment before the "virtual sex" between her and Spartan.

== Reception ==
=== Box office ===
The film debuted at No. 1 at the box office. Demolition Man grossed $58 million by the end of its box office run in North America and a total of $159 million worldwide.

Film critic Roger Ebert was asked why this film was considered a success, but Arnold Schwarzenegger's film Last Action Hero was considered a disappointment, despite similar budgets and box office grosses. Ebert concluded it was due to expectations, and that the film was seen as a comeback for Stallone whose career had been flagging, whereas Schwarzenegger failed to live up to his previous record breaking successes.

In 2017, Stallone's loan-out company filed a lawsuit against Warner Bros. Pictures over the disbursement of profits from the film. The lawsuit was settled in 2019.

=== Critical response ===
On Rotten Tomatoes, the film has an approval rating of 67% based on 45 reviews. The site's consensus reads: "A better-than-average sci-fi shoot-em-up with a satirical undercurrent, Demolition Man is bolstered by strong performances by Sylvester Stallone, Wesley Snipes, and Sandra Bullock." On Metacritic the film has a weighted average score of 34 out of 100, based on nine reviews, indicating "generally unfavorable" reviews. Audiences polled by CinemaScore gave the film an average grade of "B" on an A+ to F scale.

Critics Gene Siskel and Roger Ebert from At The Movies reviewed the film: Siskel found the film amusing but did not care for the action sequences and gave it "thumbs down", whereas Ebert enjoyed both the satirical edge this film had over other films of this genre and thought the action sequences were good for this type of film, and gave it a "thumbs up". Kenneth Turan of the Los Angeles Times wrote that the film fails to give action fans what they desire, instead substituting out-of-place satirical commentary. Vincent Canby of The New York Times called it "a significant artifact of our time or, at least, of this week". Richard Schickel of Time wrote, "Some sharp social satire is almost undermined by excessive explosions and careless casting." Peter Travers of Rolling Stone criticized the film calling it "sleek and empty as well as brutal and pointless." Emanuel Levy of Variety called it "A noisy, soulless, self-conscious pastiche that mixes elements of sci-fi, action-adventure and romance, then pours on a layer of comedy replete with Hollywood in-jokes." Levy says it "works better as a comic-book adventure" than did Last Action Hero, but reserves his praise for the technical merits of the film, complimenting "the high-tech, metallic look created by production designer David L. Snyder and his accomplished team" as well as the cinematography of Alex Thomson. He concludes "what's badly missing is a guiding intelligence to lift this disjointed pic from its derivative status."

Owen Gleiberman of Entertainment Weekly gave it a "B−". Despite his low expectations of a Joel Silver production and "the everything-goes-boom school of high-tech action overkill", he found it "an intermittently amusing sci-fi satire" before it switches to full-tilt destruction mode. Gleiberman says "if it's the promise of overwrought violence that lures people into theaters, I suspect it will be the quieter scenes—the ones with a pretense of wit—that keep them satisfied." Hal Hinson of The Washington Post wrote: "Basically, Demolition Man is a futuristic cop picture with slightly more imagination and wit than the typical example of the slash-and-burn genre."

TV Guide praised the film and wrote: "The pleasant surprise about Demolition Man is that both the script, and Stallone, are funny; the film blends big-budget action and tongue-in-cheek humor in the way that Last Action Hero tried, and failed, to do." Phillipa Bloom of Empire magazine scored it 4 out of 5, and compared it to a one-night stand "not necessarily something you'll remember next day but fast, furious and damn good fun while it lasts." Bloom was critical of the thin plot but called Stallone and Snipes "a dynamite screen combination".

=== Accolades ===
The film was nominated for three Saturn Awards: Best Costume Design (Bob Ringwood), Best Special Effects (Michael J. McAlister & Kimberly Nelson LoCascio) and Best Science Fiction Film at the 20th Saturn Awards. The MTV Movie Awards nominated Wesley Snipes in the Best Villain category at the 1994 MTV Movie Awards. Sandra Bullock was nominated for a Golden Raspberry Award for Worst Supporting Actress at the 14th Golden Raspberry Awards.

== Other media ==
=== Toys ===
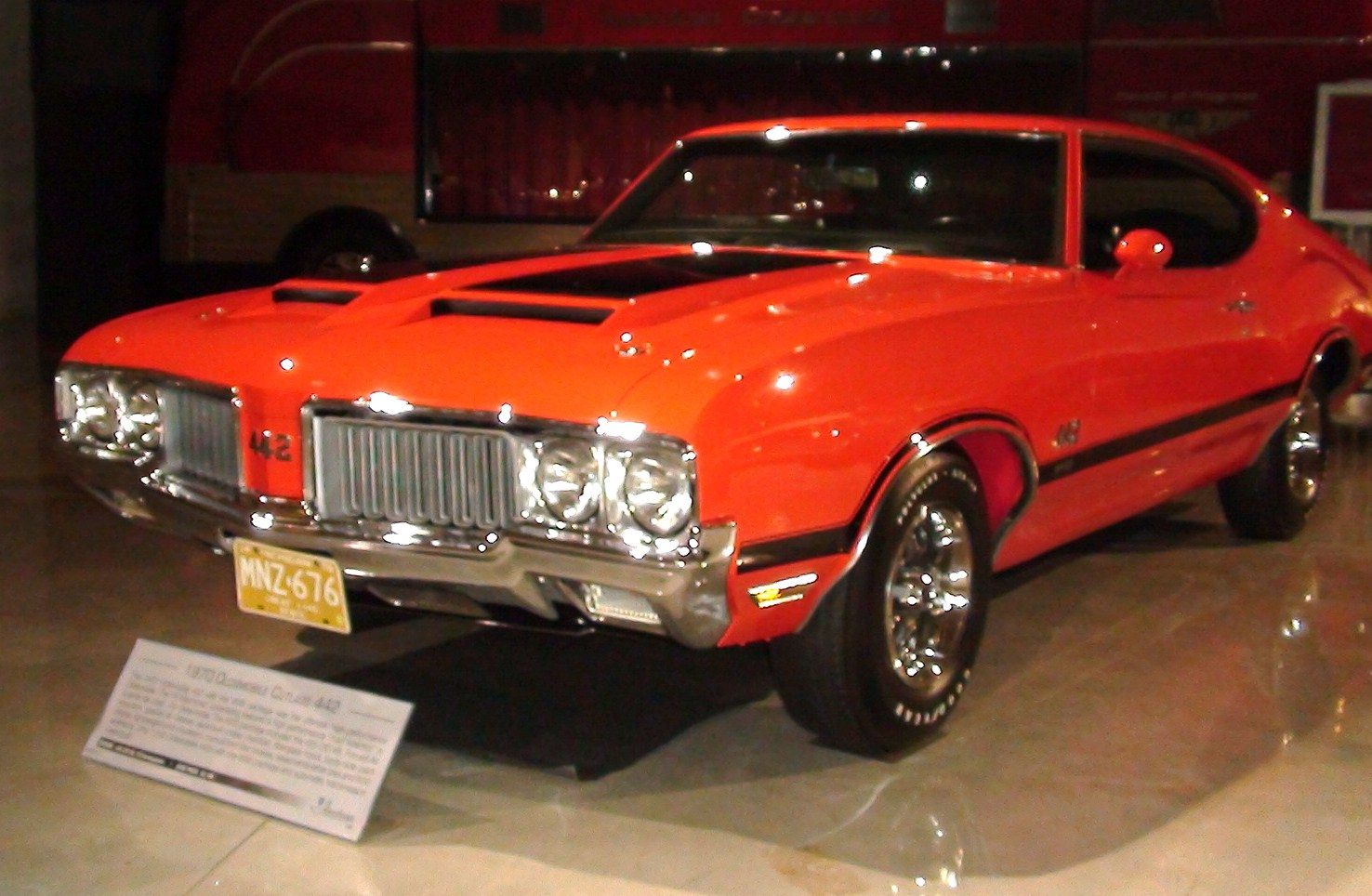
The Oldsmobile 442 was used in the car chase and also included in the Hot Wheels toys from the film.

Demolition Man action figures and vehicles were released in 1993. Produced by Mattel, the toys were based on their New Adventures of He-Man style of figures. In addition to seven action figure, the set included a car, a red convertible called the "Fast Blast 442", an airplane "Bolajet", and a "Missile Shooter" toy gun. Lenina Huxley was not included in the toy line. Hot Wheels released a set of nine cars from Demolition Man.

=== Video games ===
Acclaim Entertainment and Virgin Interactive Entertainment released Demolition Man on various home video game systems. The 16-bit versions were shooting games distributed by Acclaim. The 3DO version is a multi-genre game that incorporates Full Motion Video scenes, with both Sylvester Stallone and Wesley Snipes reprising their roles as their characters in scenes that were filmed exclusively for the game.

=== Pinball ===
In April 1994, Williams released a widebody pinball machine, Demolition Man based on the film. It was designed by Dennis Nordman. The game features sound clips from the film, as well as original speech by Stallone and Snipes.

=== Comic books ===
A four-part limited-series comic adaptation was published by DC Comics starting in November 1993, written by Gary Cohn and art by Rod Whigham with covers by Kevin Maguire.

=== Novelization ===
A novelization, written by Robert Tine (using the pseudonym Richard Osborne), was published in November 1993.

== Home media ==
Warner Bros. released Demolition Man on VHS in March 1994, on DVD in October 1997 and November 2010 and on Blu-ray in August 2011. The film was released by Arrow Video on Ultra HD Blu-ray and Blu-ray on December 10, 2024. This Limited Edition release includes both the domestic "Taco Bell" and international "Pizza Hut" versions of the film.

== Legacy ==
Inspired by the film, Dennis Rodman had his hair dyed and styled the same way the character of Simon Phoenix played by Snipes, for his San Antonio Spurs debut, which was the start of Rodman dyeing his hair in different colors. Snipes hated this hairdo and shaved it off as soon as filming had wrapped.

The development of erotic games for the Oculus Rift virtual reality headset has been compared to the "virtual sex" scene from the film.

To celebrate the film's 25th anniversary, Taco Bell recreated the 2032 San Angeles version of their restaurant at the 2018 San Diego Comic-Con.

The film has been described as a cultural touchpoint, and the restrictive future society portrayed has been used as an example of government overreach, and called a "Libertarian manifesto". Demolition Man has been referred to as "the only plausible dystopian vision for our time".

The film found renewed relevance during the COVID-19 pandemic; the film was seen as predictive when there were calls to end the practice of shaking hands and shortages of toilet paper.

In the 2020 video game Cyberpunk 2077, three shells are found in the bathroom of the player's apartment.

In 2022, Sylvester Stallone reflected positively on the movie: "I always enjoyed this movie. It was a great action film wonderfully directed by Marco Brambilla. And the writers were way ahead of their time."

In 1993, Us Weekly magazine reported a sequel was planned for 1995. In 2006, Stallone was asked about a sequel and he said, "I'd like to make a sequel to Demolition Man, but I believe that ship has sailed and maybe there are more challenges waiting on the horizon." On May 4, 2020, Stallone said a sequel was in development.
