= Constantinos Apostolou Doxiadis =

Greek architect (1913–1975)

C. A. Doxiadis
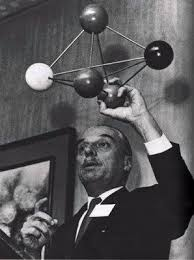
- Doxiadis teaching the principles of ekistics
- Born: 14 May 1913; Stanimaka, Kingdom of Bulgaria
- Died: 28 June 1975 (aged 62); Athens, Greece
- Occupations: Architect; urban planner
- Children: Apostolos K. Doxiadis
- Practice: Doxiadis Associates
- Buildings: Teacher–Student Centre, University of Dhaka (Bangladesh)
- Projects: Islamabad (Pakistan)

Constantinos A. Doxiadis (Note: Greek: Κωνσταντίνος Αποστόλου Δοξιάδης (pronounced [konstanˈdinos apoˈstolu ðoksiˈaðis]); also spelled Konstantinos.) (14 May 1913 – 28 June 1975), often cited as C. A. Doxiadis, was a Greek architect and urban planner, most widely known for being the lead architect and planner of Islamabad, the purpose-built capital of Pakistan in the 1960s. He is also known as the 'father of ekistics', which concerns the multi-aspectual science of human settlements.

== Theories ==
Doxiadis is the father of "ekistics", which concerns the science of human settlements, including regional, city, community planning and dwelling design. The term was coined by Doxiadis in 1942 and a major incentive for the development of the science is the emergence of increasingly large and complex settlements, tending to regional conurbations and even to a worldwide city. However, ekistics attempts to include all scales of human habitation and aims to learn from the archaeological and historical record by looking not only at great cities, but, as much as possible, at the total settlement pattern.

Doxiadis also coined the term entopia, coming from the Greek words εν ("in") and τόπος ("place").

== Influence ==
In the 1960s and 1970s, urban planner and architect Constantinos Doxiadis authored books, studies, and reports including those regarding the growth potential of the Great Lakes Megalopolis. At the peak of his popularity, in the 1960s, he addressed the US Congress on the future of American cities, his portrait illustrated the front cover of Time magazine, his company Doxiadis Associates was implementing large projects in housing, urban and regional development in more than 40 countries, his Computer Centre (UNIVAC-DACC) was at the cutting edge of the computer technology of his time and at his annual "Delos Symposium" the World Society of Ekistics attracted the worlds foremost thinkers and experts.

In Greece, he faced persistent suspicion and opposition and his recommendations were largely ignored. Having won two large contracts (National Regional Plan for Greece and Master Plan for Athens) from the Greek Junta he was criticised by competitors, after its fall in 1974, portrayed as a friend of the colonels. His visions for Athens airport to be constructed on the adjacent island of Makronissos, where political prisoners were held, together with a bridge, a rail link and a port at Lavrion were never realised.

His influence had already diminished at his death in 1975, as he was unable to speak for the last two years of his life, a victim of amyotrophic lateral sclerosis (ALS). His company Doxiadis Associates changed owners several times after his death, the heir to his computer company remained but without any links to planning or ekistics. The Delos Symposium was discontinued, and the World Society of Ekistics is today an obscure organisation.

Works about Doxiadis have appeared in the Museum of Brisbane, Milani Gallery, Brisbane and feature in the To Speak of Cities exhibition at the University of Queensland Art Museum.

== Works ==
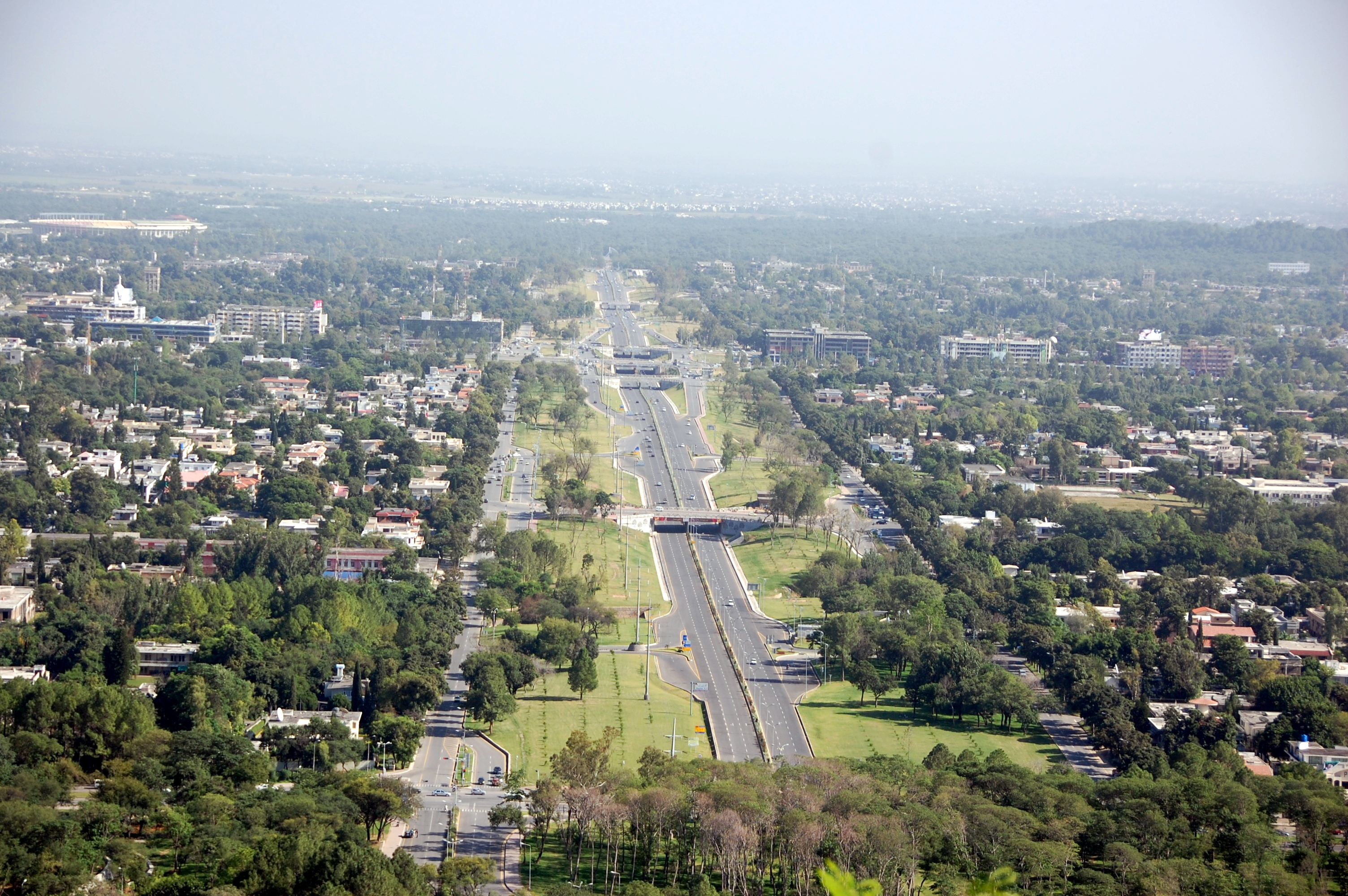
Islamabad, The capital of Pakistan

One of his best-known town planning works is Islamabad. Designed as a new city it was fully realised, unlike many of his other proposals in already existing cities, where shifting political and economic forces did not allow full implementation of his plans. The plan for Islamabad separates cars and people, allows easy and affordable access to public transport and utilities, and permits low-cost gradual expansion and growth without losing the human scale of his "communities".

In Riyadh, Doxiadis reoriented the city on a southwest-northeast axis, rendering "the planned city... similar to an immense mosque facing Mecca." His work was also part of the architecture event in the art competition at the 1936 Summer Olympics.

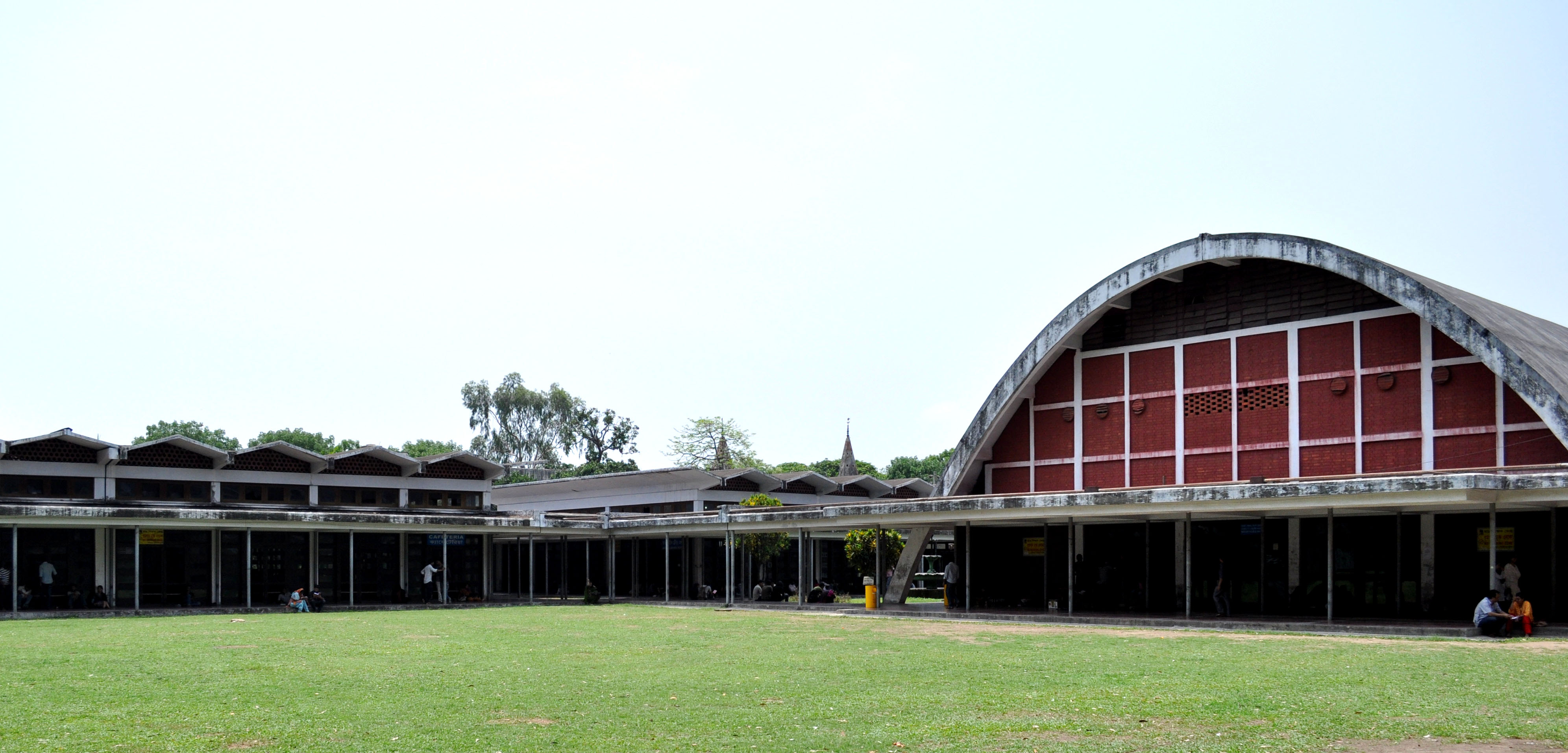
Teacher-Student Centre (TSC), University of Dhaka, Bangladesh

- The Sacrifices of Greece in the Second World War (exhibit, San Francisco City Hall, 1945)
- Sadr City of Baghdad, Iraq (1959)
- Master Plan of Islamabad, The capital of Pakistan;1960
- Master Plan for Skopje, city reconstruction plan following a major earthquake 1963.
- Teacher-Student Centre (TSC), University of Dhaka, Bangladesh; 1961
- Plan Doxiadis, Rio de Janeiro, 1965.
- Quaid-e-Azam Campus, University of the Punjab, Lahore, Pakistan, 1973.

== Awards ==
His awards and decorations are as follows:

- Greek War Cross, for his services during the war of 1940-41 (1941)
- Order of the British Empire, for his activities in the Greek Resistance and for his collaboration with the Allied Forces, Middle East (1945)
- Order of the Cedar of Lebanon, for his contribution to the development of Lebanon (1958)
- Order of the Phoenix for his contribution to the development of Greece (1960)
- Sir Patrick Abercrombie Prize of the International Union of Architects (1963)
- Cali de Oro (Mexican Gold Medal) Award of the Society of Mexican Architects (1963)
- Award of Excellence, Industrial Designers Society of America (1965)
- Aspen Award for the Humanities (1966)
- Order of the Yugoslav Flag with Golden Wreath (1966)

== Publications ==
=== Books ===
- Dynapolis: The City of the Future. Doxiadis Associates. 1960. OL 16592889M.
- Doxiadis, Constantinos A. (1966). Emergence and Growth of an Urban Region: The Developing Urban Detroit Area. Detroit: Detroit Edison.
- Doxiadis, Constantinos A. (1966). Urban Renewal and the Future of the American City. Chicago: Public Administration Service.
- Doxiadis, Constantinos A. (1968). Ekistics: An Introduction to the Science of Human Settlements. New York: Oxford University Press.
- Doxiadis, Constantinos A. (1972). Architectural Space in Ancient Greece. Cambridge: MIT Press. ISBN 9780262368087.
- Doxiadis, Constantinos A. (1974). Anthropopolis: City for Human Development. New York: W.W. Norton.
- Doxiadis, Constantinos A.; Papaioannou, J.G. (1974). Ecumenopolis: The Inevitable City of the Future. Athens: Athens Center of Ekistics.
- Doxiadis, Constantinos A. (1975). Building Entopia. Athens: Athens Publishing Center.
- Doxiadis, Constantinos A. (1976). Action for Human Settlements. New York: W.W. Norton.

=== Journal articles ===
- Doxiadis, Constantinos A. (1965). "Islamabad, the creation of a new capital" (PDF). Town Planning Review. 36 (1): 1. doi:10.3828/tpr.36.1.f4148303n72753nm. S2CID 147532909.
- Doxiadis, Constantinos A. (1967). "On Linear Cities". Town Planning Review. 38 (1): 35. doi:10.3828/tpr.38.1.70733287173p06k8.
- Doxiadis, Constantinos A. (1968). "Man's Movement and His City". Science. 162 (3851): 326–334. Bibcode:1968Sci...162..326D. doi:10.1126/science.162.3851.326. PMID 17836649.

== See also ==
- Settlement hierarchy
