= Ecumenopolis =

Hypothetical planet-spanning city

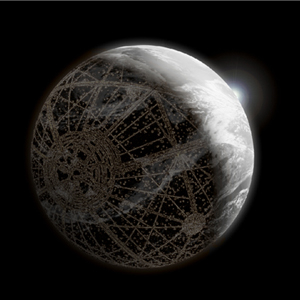
A depiction of a planetwide city

Ecumenopolis (from Ancient Greek οἰκουμένη (oikouménē) 'the inhabited world' and πόλις (pólis) 'city'; lit. 'world city'; pl. ecumenopolises or ecumenopoleis) is the hypothetical concept of a planetwide city. It is primarily known as a stock setting in science fiction, but has also received serious consideration in theoretical city planning and futurist concepts.

== Description ==
The word was invented in 1962 by the Greek city planner Constantinos Apostolou Doxiadis to represent the idea that, in the future, urban areas and megalopolises would eventually fuse, and there would be a single continuous worldwide city as a progression from the current urbanization, population growth, transport and human networks. According to Doxiadis, it was the fifteenth level of ekistic units and the most significant one as the uppermost echelon of the classification. This concept was already current in science fiction in 1942, with Trantor in Isaac Asimov's Foundation series. When made public, Doxiadis' idea of ecumenopolis seemed "close to science fiction", but today is "surprisingly pertinent" according to geography researchers Pavle Stamenovic, Dunja Predic and Davor Eres, especially as a consequence of globalization.

Doxiadis also created a scenario based on the traditions and trends of urban development of his time, predicting at first a European eperopolis ("continent city") which would be based on the area between London, Paris, Rhine-Ruhr and Amsterdam. In 2008, Time magazine coined Nylonkong to link New York City, London, and Hong Kong as the eperopolis of the Americas, Euro-Africa and Asia-Pacific respectively.

== In popular culture ==
Before the term had been created, the concept had been previously discussed. The American religious leader Thomas Lake Harris (1823–1906) mentioned city-planets in his verses, and science fiction author Isaac Asimov used the city-planet Trantor as the setting of some of his Foundation novels.

In science fiction, the ecumenopolis has become a frequent topic and was popularized in 1999 by the fictional city planet Coruscant in the Star Wars franchise, which is the capital of the Galactic Republic (later Empire) and home to the Jedi Order. Other ecumenopolises feature in Star Wars media, including Anoat, Nar Shaddaa and Taris. The latter two worlds had historically rivaled Coruscant itself, but both then suffered from severe deindustrialization in their later years.

In Dune, the Harkonnens' home world of Giedi Prime is a heavily polluted ecumenopolis.

In Transformers, the alien world of Cybertron is often depicted as an ecumenopolis, possibly due to the mechanical nature of the planet and inhabitants.

The concept is depicted in video games like Stellaris, where players are given the option of transforming planets into ecumenopolises; and RimWorld with its glitterworlds, highly advanced planets that are juxtaposed against the planets of the rim on which the gameplay takes place.

A central setting in the tabletop wargame Warhammer 40,000 is a portrayal of Earth in the far future, where it is described as having been transformed into a vast, Gothic-style ecumenopolis. The ecumenopolis contains multiple continent-scale districts housing different branches of society and government. It is the focus of the "Siege of Terra" storyline of the wider Horus Heresy novel series.

In Magic: the Gathering, the plane of Ravnica is an ecumenopolis.

DC Comics continuity features Darkseid's extra-dimensional home planet of Apokolips, often depicted as a hellish world covered entirely in industrial sprawl to feed Darkseid's brutal empire.

The manga and film of Blame! by Tsutomu Nihei is set in a far future in which Earth has become the ruins of planet-covering city, which is suggested to be so large that it has consumed most of the Solar System as well, it may also be along the lines of a hollow-world or dyson shell. Some of his other works also take place in this same setting.

== See also ==
- Arcology
- Artificial planet
- Conurbation
- Ecumene
- Ekistics
- Megacity
- Megalopolis
- Megastructure
- Merger (politics)
- Metropolis
- Principles of intelligent urbanism
- Urban sprawl
- World government
