= Global Human Settlement Layer =

The Global Human Settlement Layer (GHSL) is a project from the European Commission that creates global geographical data about the evolution of human habitation on Earth. This is in the form of population density maps, built-up maps, and settlement maps. This information is produced using new geographic data mining tools and knowledge and analytics based on empirical data.

The GHSL processing framework uses a range of data, including census data, archives of fine-scale global satellite imagery, and voluntarily provided geographic information. Data is processed automatically to produce analytics and knowledge that methodically and objectively describe the existence of people and developed infrastructure. The GHSL maps human presence on Earth, sourcing information from 1975 and up to 2030.

== Background ==
In 2010–2011, the JRC Directorate E "Space, Security & Migration" developed the initial version of the GHSL concept, which was used to create the Atlases of the Human Planet. The JRC is currently supporting GHSL activities through its scientific working plans and is collaborating with the Directorate-General for Regional and Urban Policy (DG REGIO) and the Directorate-General for Defence Industry and Space (DG DEFIS) to develop a routine and operational monitoring system.
