= Megalopolis =

Grouping of neighbouring metropolises

Megalopolises of the world

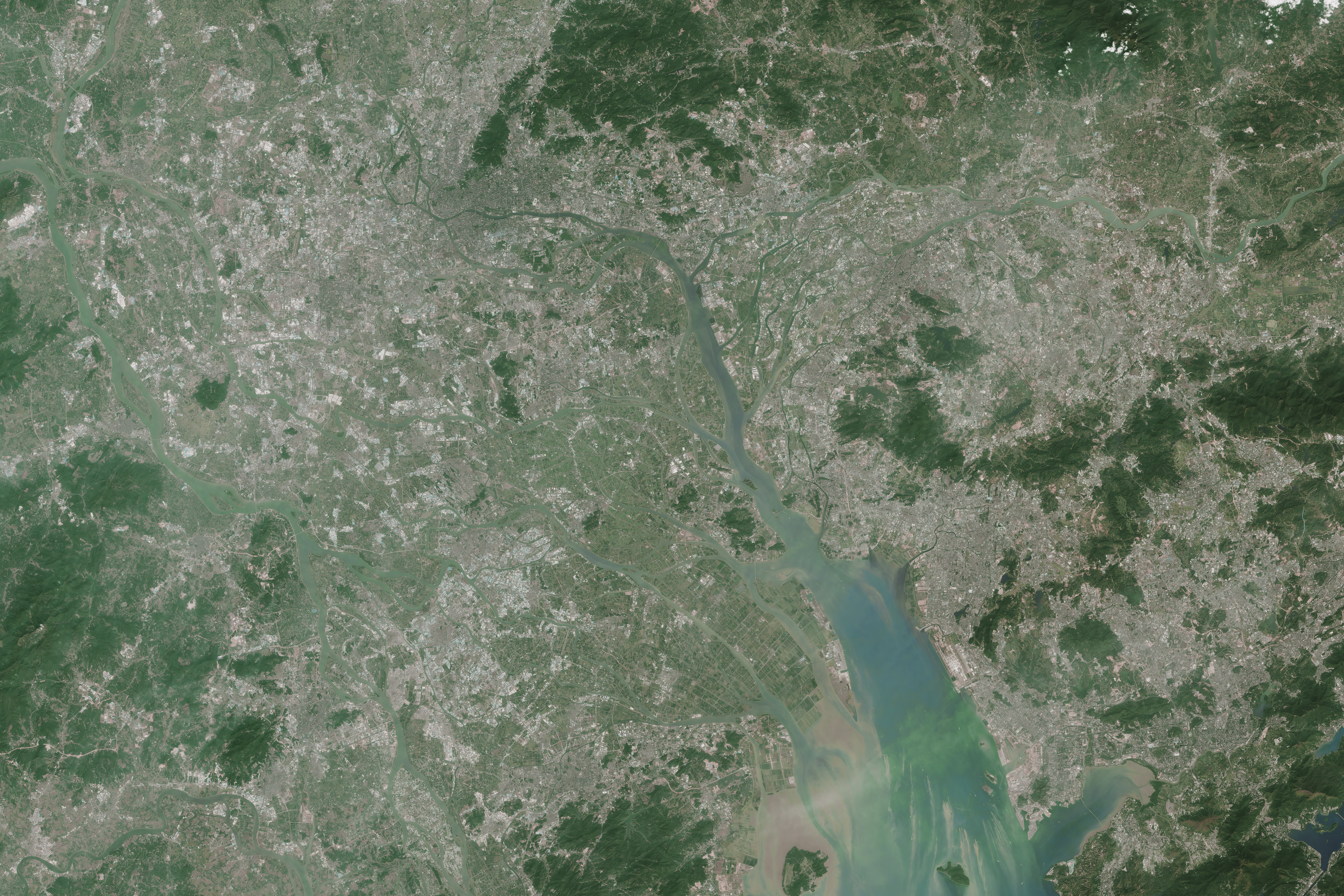
A satellite image of the Pearl River Delta area in China

A megalopolis (/ˌmɛɡəˈlɒpəlɪs/), also called a supercity or megaregion, is a group of metropolitan areas which are perceived as a continuous urban area through common systems of transport, economy, resources, ecology, and so on. They are integrated enough that coordinating policy is valuable, although the constituent metropolises keep their individual identities. The megalopolis concept has become highly influential as it introduced a new, larger scale thinking about urban patterns and growth.

== Etymology and earlier definitions ==
The term comes from the Greek word megalo-polis (big city), and was originally given as an aspirational name to the settlement of Megalopolis in Arcadia in southern Greece, founded during the 4th century BC. In modern history, the term has geographic definitions dating from 1832, when its meaning was "a very large, heavily populated urban complex".

In the late 1950s and early 1960s, Jean Gottmann, a professor of political science at the University of Paris and member of the Institute for Advanced Study at Princeton, directed "A Study of Megalopolis" for The Twentieth Century Fund, wherein he described a megalopolis as a "world of ideas". Gottmann, in his extensive studies, applied the term megalopolis to an analysis of the urbanized northeastern seaboard of the U.S., in particular from Boston, Massachusetts to Washington, D.C. (the Northeast megalopolis).

== Modern definitions ==
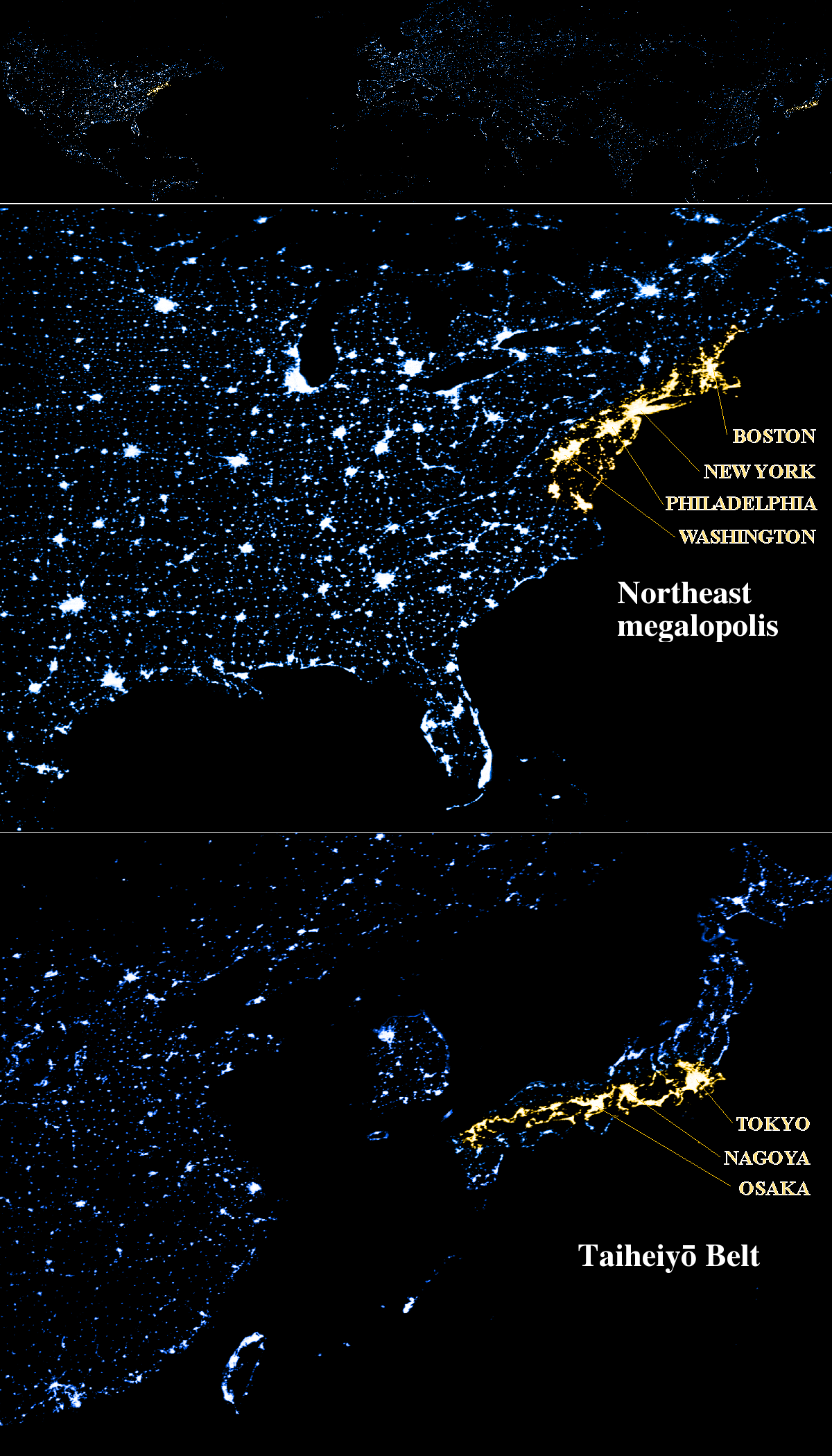
Northeast megalopolis (United States) (top) and Taiheiyō Belt (Japan) (bottom)

A megalopolis may also be called a megaregion. "Megalopolis" and other similar terms have been used by different scholars and countries to describe similar spatial forms.

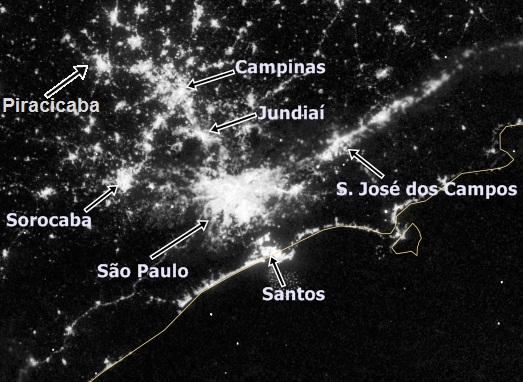
The São Paulo macrometropolis in Brazil

A megalopolis, following the work of Gottmann, refers to two or more roughly adjacent metropolitan areas that, through a commonality of systems—e.g., of transport, economy, resources, and ecologies—experience a blurring of the boundaries between the population centers, such that while some degree of separation may remain, their perception as a continuous urban area is of value, e.g., "to coordinate policy at this expanded scale". Simply put, a megalopolis (or a megaregion) is a clustered network of big cities. Gottmann defined its population as 25 million, while Doxiadis defined a small megalopolis a similar cluster with a population of about 10 million. America 2050, a program of the Regional Plan Association (RPA), lists 11 megaregions in the United States and Canada.

Megaregions of the United States were explored in a July 2005 report by Robert E. Lang and Dawn Dhavale of the Metropolitan Institute at Virginia Tech. A later 2007 article by Lang and Nelson uses 20 "megapolitan" areas grouped into 10 megaregions. The concept is based on the original "Megalopolis model".

Modern interlinked ground transportation corridors, such as rail and highway, often aid in the development of megalopolises. Using these commuter passageways to travel throughout the megalopolis is informally called megaloping, a term coined by Davide Gadren and Stefan Berteau.

In Brazil, the term megarregião has a legal meaning, different from the English word megaregion: mesoregions of Brazil (mesorregião) and microregions of Brazil (microrregião).

In China, the official term corresponding to the meaning of "megalopolis" is '城市群' (chéngshì qún), which, in Chinese, was originally coined by Yao Shimou and literally means "city cluster". A "city cluster" is defined as "[a]n area in which cities are relatively densely distributed in a certain region". In an older standard, the term was mistranslated as "agglomeration". In 2019, National Development and Reform Commission (NDRC) published guidelines and made a distinction from a similar concept "metropolitan area" (都市圈), which is of a smaller scale than a city cluster. In the latest standard terminologies of both economics and urban planning, 城市群 is translated as "city cluster", replacing "agglomeration". Megalopolises in China have become the subject of national government planning.

Since, presently, urban data are based on arbitrary definitions that vary from country to country and from year or census to the next, making them difficult to compare, an Urban Metric System (UMS) has been conceived that could correct the problem, since it allows computing the urban area limits and central points, and it can be applied in the same way to all past, present and future population and job distributions.

UMS is based on vector field calculations obtained by assuming that, in a given space, all inhabitants and jobs exert the same attractive force A and repulsive force R. The net force (A - R) exerted by each inhabitant or job is given by [1/(1 + d)] - [1/( β + d/2)], where d = distance and β is the only parameter. UMS distinguishes the following types of urban areas (including "Megalopolis"), each type corresponding to a given value of β:

	Urban area	Distance at which the attractive force = the repulsive force	Value of β
1	Central city	10 km	6
2	Agglomeration	20 km	11
3	Metropolis	40 km	21
4	Patropolis	80 km	41
5	Megalopolis	160 km	81
6	Urban system	320 km	161
7	Urban macrosystem	640 km	321
8	Continental system	1,280 km	641
9	Intercontinental system	2,560 km	1,281
10	World system	5,120 km	2,561

UMS has been applied to some Canadian cases since 2018, but the data presented in this article are still based on the various existing national definitions, which are disparate.

== In popular culture ==
=== Judge Dredd ===
In the Judge Dredd (1977) comic book series and its spinoff series, Mega-City One is a huge fictional megalopolis-size city-state covering much of what is now the Eastern United States and some of Canada. The exact geography of the city depends on which writer and artist has done which story. However, from its first appearance it has been associated with New York City's urban sprawl; originally, it was presented as a future New York, which was retconned as the centre of a "Mega-City One" in the very next story. The Architects' Journal placed it at No. 1 in their list of "comic book cities".

=== Sprawl trilogy ===
In William Gibson's Sprawl trilogy, "the Sprawl" is a colloquial name for the "Boston-Atlanta Metropolitan Axis" (BAMA), an urban sprawl environment on a massive scale, and a fictional extension of the real Northeast megalopolis. The Sprawl is a visualization of a future where virtually the entire East Coast of the United States, from Boston to Atlanta, has melded into a single mass of urban sprawl. It has been enclosed in several geodesic domes and merged into one megacity. The city has become a separate world with its own climate, no real night/day cycle, and an artificial sky that is always grey.

=== Megalopolis (film) ===
In Francis Ford Coppola's 2024 film Megalopolis, architect Cesar Catalina (Adam Driver) endeavors to build a city of the future within New Rome out of a material known as "Megalon". This city, built on top of the crater caused by a fallen USSR satellite, is the titular Megalopolis.

=== Dune ===
The seat of political power on the planet Arrakis under the rule of the tyrannical Harkonnen family was the megalopolis "Carthag". When house Atreides was given control of the planet, they ruled from the capital city, Arrakeen.

== See also ==
- Arcology
- Conurbation
- Ecumenopolis
- Ekistics
- Settlement types:
  - Hamlet
  - Village
  - Town
  - City
  - Metropolis
  - Classification of inhabited localities in Russia
- Global city
- Merger (politics)
- Transborder agglomeration
- Urban area
- Developed environments:
  - Exurban
  - Rural
  - Suburban
  - Urban
