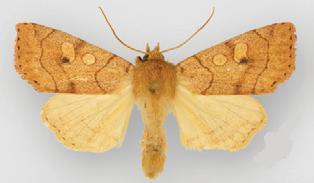
- Male
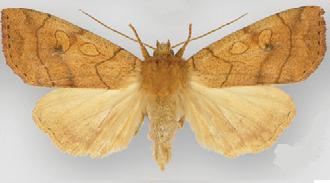
- Female

Scientific classification
- Domain: Eukaryota
- Kingdom: Animalia
- Phylum: Arthropoda
- Class: Insecta
- Order: Lepidoptera
- Superfamily: Noctuoidea
- Family: Noctuidae
- Genus: Enargia
- Species: E. fausta

Binomial name
- Enargia fausta Schmidt, 2010

= Enargia fausta =

Species of moth

Enargia fausta is a moth of the family Noctuidae. It is restricted to the boreal forest and boreal-deciduous forest transition zone, and (unlike E. infumata) does not range south along the Rocky Mountains nor as far north. Specimens examined range from central Alberta to New Brunswick and in the East as far south as the Ottawa River Valley, but the species presumably also occurs in appropriate habitats in northern New York and New England. Ferguson (1954) illustrates a specimen from Glennville, Nova Scotia. Reports of this species from north-eastern Ohio (Rings et al. 1992, as E. infumata) need to be verified.

It is similar to, and was long confused with Enargia infumata.

The length of the forewings is 17.5 mm for males. Adults are on wing from late July to early September with most records after mid-August..

Larvae have been recorded on Betula papyrifera, Populus tremuloides and Populus balsamifera.

== Etymology ==
The specific epithet is derived from Faustus, or Faust, the alchemist of German legend who sold his soul to Mephistopheles, or Mephisto, in exchange for knowledge. The ending is amended for a more euphonious combination with Enargia, and is a noun in apposition.
