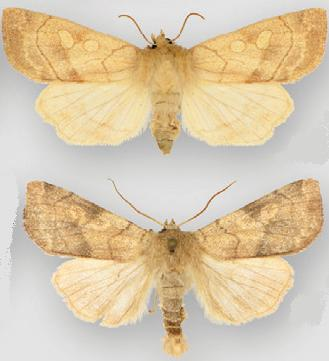
- Female (top), Male (bottom)

Scientific classification
- Kingdom: Animalia
- Phylum: Arthropoda
- Class: Insecta
- Order: Lepidoptera
- Superfamily: Noctuoidea
- Family: Noctuidae
- Genus: Enargia
- Species: E. decolor

Binomial name
- Enargia decolor (Walker, 1858)

Synonyms
- Mythimna decolor Walker, 1858; Enargia discolor; Smith 1900 (misspelling); Enargia decolora; Hampson 1910 (unjustified emendation); Enargia decolora ab. mia Strand, 1916; Enargia decolora ab. sia Strand, 1916

= Enargia decolor =

Species of moth

The pale enargia or aspen twoleaf tier (Enargia decolor) is a moth of the family Noctuidae. It has a boreal-transcontinental distribution, occurring across the Canadian boreal plain and then southward through the western cordillera at higher elevations, where it is presumably limited by the availability of trembling aspen and possibly other poplars. Records range from northernmost British Columbia and south-western Northwest Territories east to New Brunswick. It has also been reported from Nova Scotia, Ohio and New York. In the western United States it is known from western Montana, Idaho, Washington, Oregon, Nevada, Utah, Wyoming (Albany and Carbon counties), western Colorado, New Mexico (Grant Co.), and Arizona (Graham Co.). There are no records from the Rocky Mountain front ranges of Colorado, where it would be expected to be widespread if there is a continuous distribution southward into New Mexico and Arizona. The populations from west of the Rocky Mountains south to New Mexico and Arizona may represent a distinct species.

The wingspan is 30–40 mm. Adults are on wing from late July to early September with most records after mid-August.

Larvae have been recorded on Betula papyrifera, Populus balsamifera, Salix species, Populus grandidentata and Alnus rugosa, but can reach population levels high enough to cause extensive defoliation of Populus tremuloides stands in boreal forests.
