= California megapolitan areas =

Human settlement in the United States

California's major urban areas normally are thought of as two large megalopolises: one in Northern California (with 12.6 million inhabitants) and one in Southern California (with 23.8 million inhabitants), separated from each other by approximately 382 miles or 615 km (the distance from Los Angeles to San Francisco), with relatively sparsely inhabited Central Coast, Central Valley, and Transverse Ranges in between. Other ideas conceive of a single megalopolis encompassing both North and South, or a division of Coastal California vs. Inland California. These regional concepts are usually based on geographic, cultural, political, and environmental differences, rather than transportation and infrastructure connectivity and boundaries.

== Notable conceptions ==
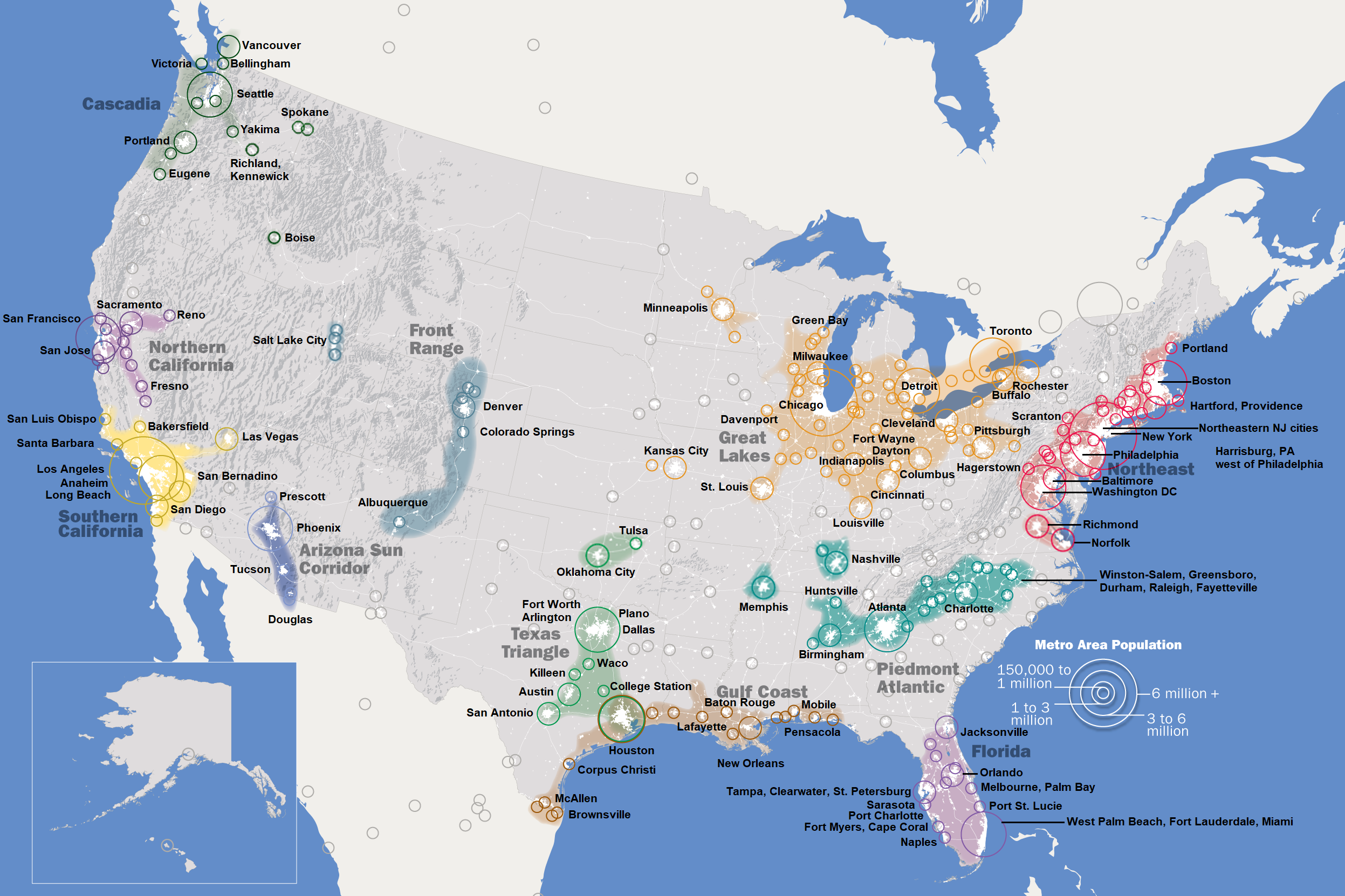
Megaregions of the United States

"Beyond Megalopolis", by Virginia Tech's Metropolitan Institute, defines two megapolitan areas which extend from California into Nevada: NorCal, which includes the Reno, Nevada area, and the Southland which encompasses Greater Los Angeles, the Inland Empire, and San Diego and includes Metropolitan Las Vegas.

America 2050, an organization sponsored by the Rockefeller and Ford Foundations, lists 11 megaregions in the United States and Canada. This includes the Southern and Northern California megaregions in which Southern California includes Greater Los Angeles, San Diego–Tijuana, the Inland Empire and Las Vegas Valley.

Futurists Herman Kahn and Anthony Wiener coined the name "SanSan" to refer to "a Pacific megalopolis that would presumably stretch initially from San Diego to Santa Barbara, and ultimately from San Francisco to Santa Barbara" (along with other megalopolises BosWash and Chipitts) in their 1967 book The Year 2000. The notion of a megalopolis stretching from San Diego to Santa Barbara corresponds to the conventional notion of a Southern California megalopolis. But the prediction that there would ultimately be a Pacific megalopolis stretching all the way from San Diego to San Francisco, joining Southern and Northern California along the coast, does not conform to subsequent growth patterns, which instead extend inland to Metropolitan Sacramento and the Inland Empire.

== Northern California ==
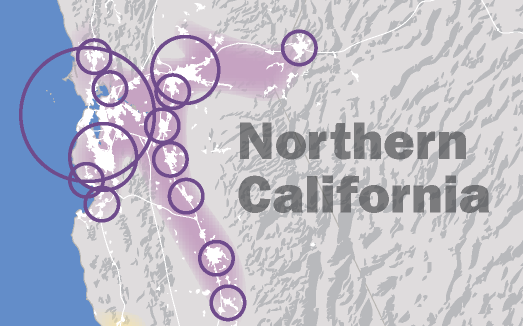
Northern California megaregion

Northern California holds 21 counties that are part of metropolitan areas, including one in Nevada, and includes an additional 17 neighboring counties and 4 Nevada counties in the sphere of influence. Currently, all three of the metropolitan regions of Northern California (Bay Area, Greater Sacramento, and Metropolitan Fresno) are connected but are separated from Greater Los Angeles with Kings, Tulare, and Kern Counties at the narrowest gap. However, one of metropolitan regions of each part of the state borders one of the two metropolitan regions of Nevada, Sacramento bordering Reno and Greater Los Angeles bordering Las Vegas.

California's economy as a whole is the largest of any state in the United States and is the fourth largest economy in the world. The Northern California megaregion is home to the Silicon Valley with major corporations such as Cisco Systems, Apple Inc., Oracle, EBay, Yahoo!, Facebook, YouTube, Google, and Hewlett-Packard, the San Francisco Financial District (home to headquarters of various financial and business firms such as VISA, Wells Fargo, and Union Bank of California and is the largest financial district outside New York City), Wine Country, and much of the Central Valley, which is one of the world's most productive agricultural areas, producing 8% of the nation's crops. The centers of major national government offices, such as the United States Court of Appeals for the Ninth Circuit, the Federal Reserve Bank of San Francisco, and the U.S. Mint, as well as the California State Capitol and the California Supreme Court are all located within the region. The Bay Area also has the largest concentration of multi-millionaire households of any metropolitan area in the country and the largest concentration of billionaires of any U.S. metropolitan area, almost more than the next three metropolitan areas combined.

== Southern California ==
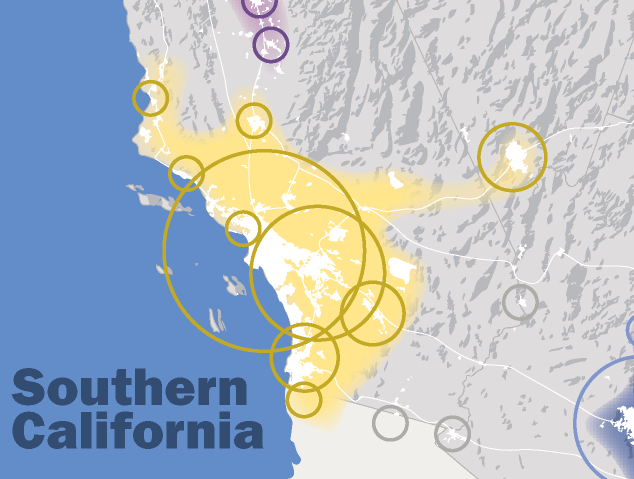
Southern California megaregion

Southern California holds the eight counties and municipalities of Greater Los Angeles, the Inland Empire (largely Riverside and San Bernardino Counties), and San Diego-Tijuana. Kern County and two Nevada counties are within the sphere of influence of Greater Los Angeles, while Imperial County and Mexicali Municipality are within San Diego-Tijuana's sphere of influence.

The transnational Southern California megaregion is also a very important economic center in the U.S., and indeed also in Mexico, as it includes Tijuana, Mexico. Southern California is home to the Port of Los Angeles and Port of Long Beach (the first and second busiest container ports in the U.S. respectively) and the Port of San Diego. The global center of the entertainment business, Southern California leads the world in the motion picture, television, and recorded music industry and is the home base for Hollywood, with studios such as The Walt Disney Company, ABC, Sony Pictures, Warner Bros., Universal Studios, MGM, Paramount Pictures, and 20th Century Fox headquartered here. Corporations such as Fox Sports Net, Guess, In-n-Out Burger, ARCO, Farmers, and many financial and banking companies are also based in the region. Southern California has long been the leading region in the U.S. for aviation and aerospace, and is one of the top five regions in the U.S. for the high-technology industry.

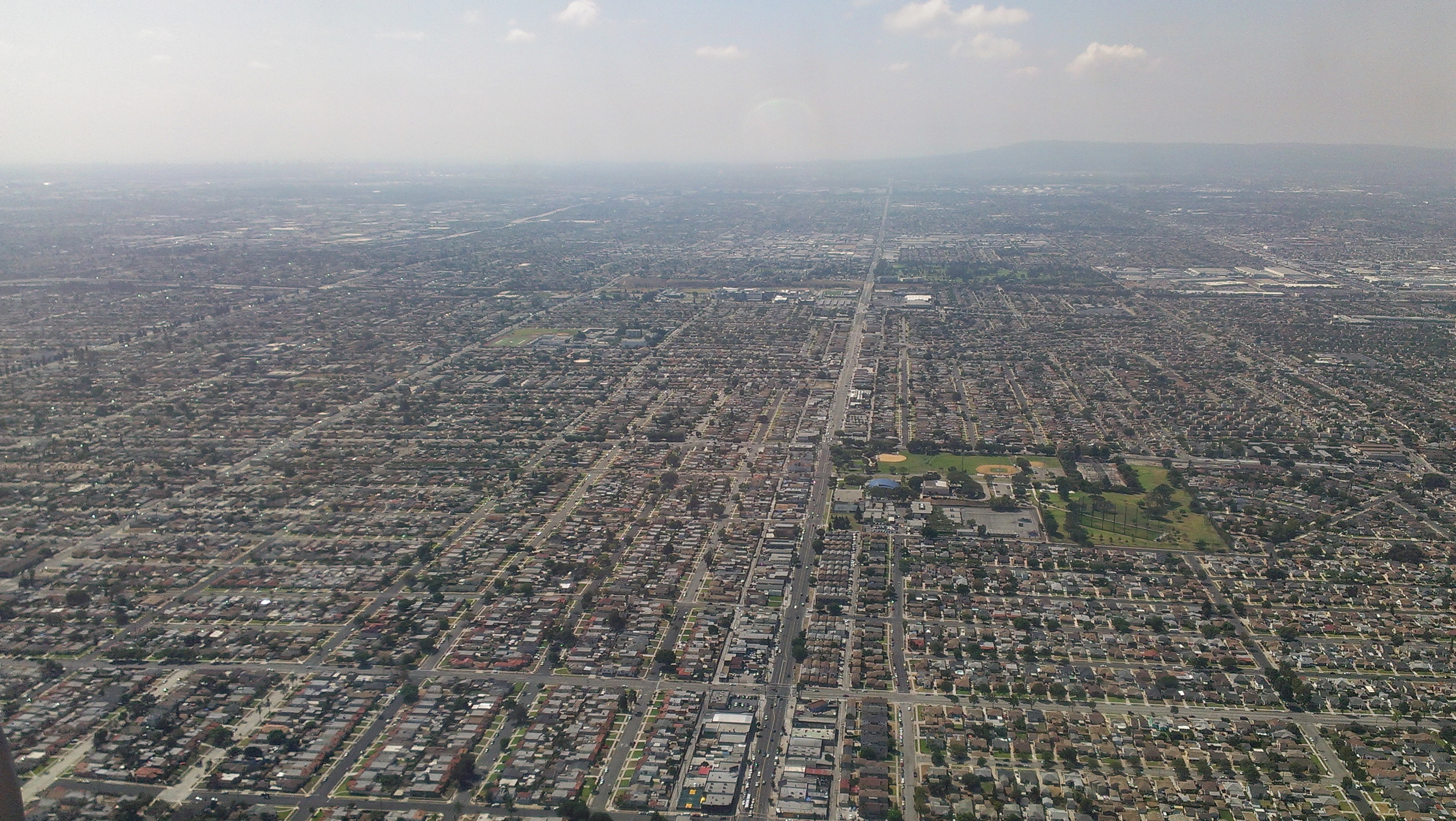
Greater Los Angeles

Southern California is also one of the world's largest tourist industries thanks to its famous beaches, entertainment districts such as L.A. Live and Sunset Boulevard, and theme parks including Disneyland, Knott's Berry Farm, and Universal Studios Hollywood. San Diego is an important port city, industrial, commercial, and shipbuilding center. It has a flourishing tourism industry, many research institutions, a large biomedical/biotechnology industry, and it is home to one of the largest concentrations of U.S. military bases and personnel of any large American city. Las Vegas is the largest city in Nevada, the world's second largest gambling/gaming center after Macau, and one of the fastest growing large cities and metropolitan areas in the United States.

== Coastal and Inland California ==
The vast, relatively sparsely populated area of Central California weakens the proposal that California constitutes a single megalopolis. The northern and southern regions continue to grow toward one another, however, with much of this recent urbanization occurring not along the expensive and crowded coast itself – or even along the somewhat developed first tier of interior coastal valleys – but farther inland along a north–south axis through the midsection of the state in the Central Valley, Antelope Valley, Inland Empire and San Joaquin Valley regions, all comparatively more affordable areas which are becoming increasingly suburbanized as they are within commuting distance (albeit often a long commute) of the state's major coastal cities.

== See also ==
- Conurbation
- Megalopolis (city type)
- Megaregions of the United States
- Urban agglomeration
