= Megaregions of the United States =

Geographic designation proposed by Regional Planning Association

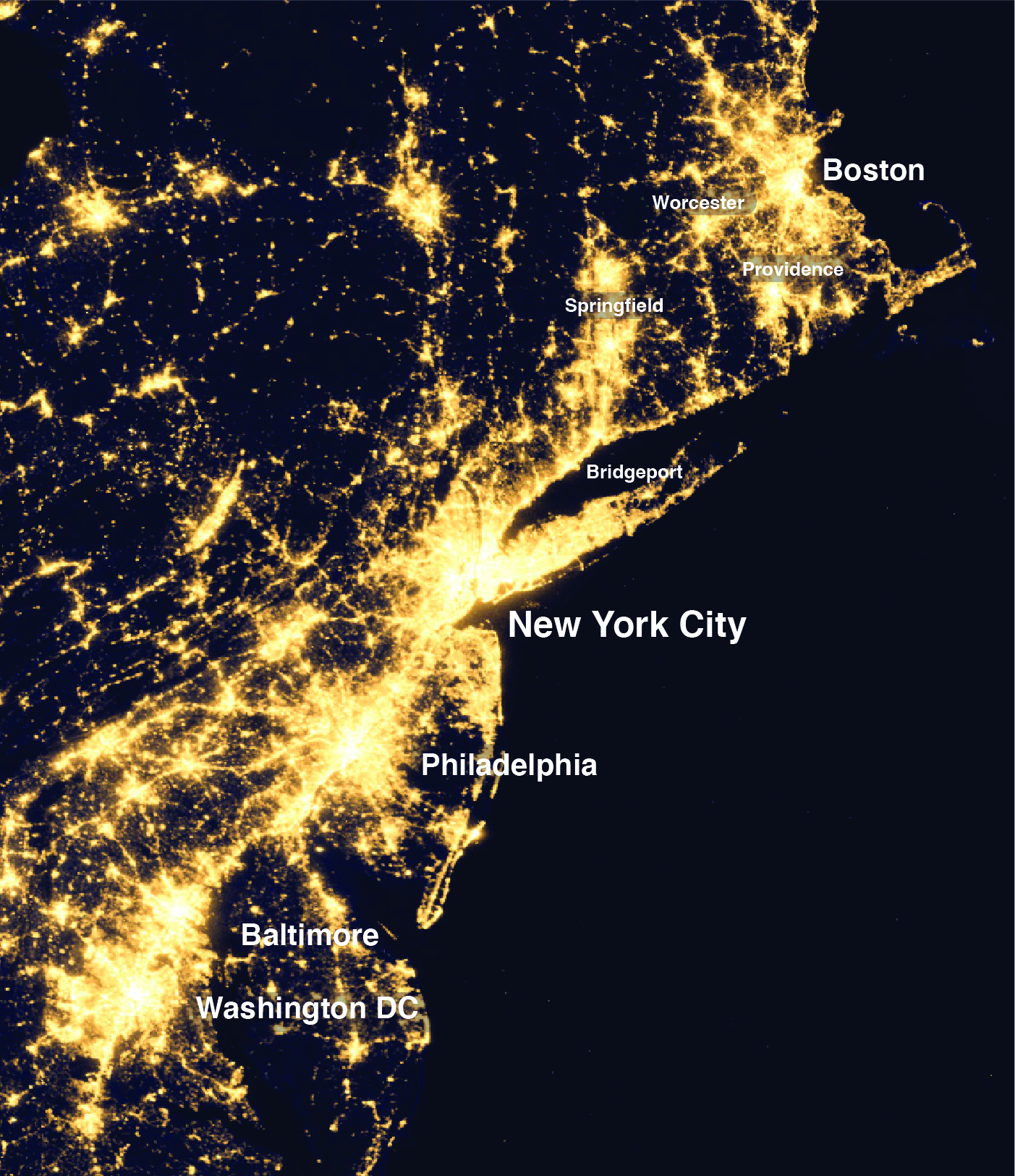
Northeast megalopolis (megaregion) at night. Imagery was collected by the Suomi NPP satellite in April and October 2012, courtesy of the NASA Earth Observatory/NOAA NGDC.

"Megaregion" is a term proposed by the Regional Plan Association (RPA), an American think-tank focused on urban planning. The megaregions of the United States, as the RPA defines them, are 11 regions of the United States that contain two or more roughly adjacent urban metropolitan areas that, through commonality of systems, including transportation, economies, resources, and ecologies, experience blurred boundaries between the urban centers, being perceived and acting as if they are a continuous urban area.

Such a region is also known as a "megalopolis", a term initially coined to define the Northeastern United States, which ranges from Boston in the north to Washington, D.C., in the south. That region has an estimated population of over 50 million people as of 2022 and includes some of the nation's largest cities, such as Baltimore, New York City, and Philadelphia.

== Definition ==
In the perspective of a Texas research group whose focus is "education, and technology transfer initiatives to improve the mobility of people and goods in urban and rural communities of megaregions," there is no single, preponderant, widely agreed-upon statutory/regulatory definition of a megaregion. Historically, it is the modernized term offered to the geography, urban planning, and related communities via the America 2050 initiative to describe a group of two or more roughly adjacent metropolitan areas that, through commonality of systems—e.g., of transport, economy, resources, and ecologies—experience a blurring of the boundaries between the population centers, such that while some degree of separation may remain, their perception as a continuous urban area, e.g., "to coordinate policy at this expanded scale", is of value.

Its direct antecedent, in the same organization and scholarship, is in the term megalopolis, which was repurposed from earlier different meanings by Jean Gottmann of the University of Paris and the Institute for Advanced Study at Princeton in the late 1950s and early 1960s. Gottmann directed "A Study of Megalopolis" for The Twentieth Century Fund, applying that term to an analysis of the urbanized northeastern seaboard of the U.S. spanning from Boston in the north to Washington, D.C., in the south and including New York City, Philadelphia, and Baltimore, which was named the Northeast megalopolis, which became known as the "Northeast megaregion" in the work of America 2050 [and its sponsor, the Regional Plan Association (RPA)]. (The RPA is an independent, New York-based non-profit planning organization.) A reputable, broader American description from the same organization defines a megaregion as a large network of metropolitan regions that share several or all of the following:

- environmental systems and topography,
- infrastructure systems,
- economic linkages,
- settlement and land use patterns, and
- culture and history.

According to the RPA, as of this date, more than 70 percent of the nation's population and employment opportunities are located in the 11 U.S. megaregions they have identified. Megaregions are spoken of as becoming the new competitive units in the global economy, characterized by the increasing movement of goods, people and capital among their metropolitan regions. "The New Megas", asserts Richard Florida, "are the real economic organizing units of the world, producing the bulk of its wealth, attracting a large share of its talent and generating the lion's share of innovation."

Despite these scholarly perspectives, statutory and regulatory documents have not arrived at a single definition, which has led to "variations on what should be prioritized within megaregions across jurisdictions". The megaregion concept provides cities and metropolitan regions a context within which to cooperate across jurisdictional borders, including the coordination of policies, to address specific challenges experienced at the megaregion scale, such as planning for high-speed rail, protecting large watersheds, and coordinating regional economic development strategies. However, megaregions are not formally recognized in the hierarchy of governance structure like a city or metropolitan planning organization (MPO). In cont, megaregions that cross international borders (such as the Southern California, Gulf Coast, and Arizona Sun Corridor megaregions), while having a shared history and culture, are often limited in power. Overall, planning in cross-jurisdictional megaregions can be susceptible to varying levels of regulations. This makes creating plans for megaregions surprisingly complex.

=== Identified U.S. megaregions ===
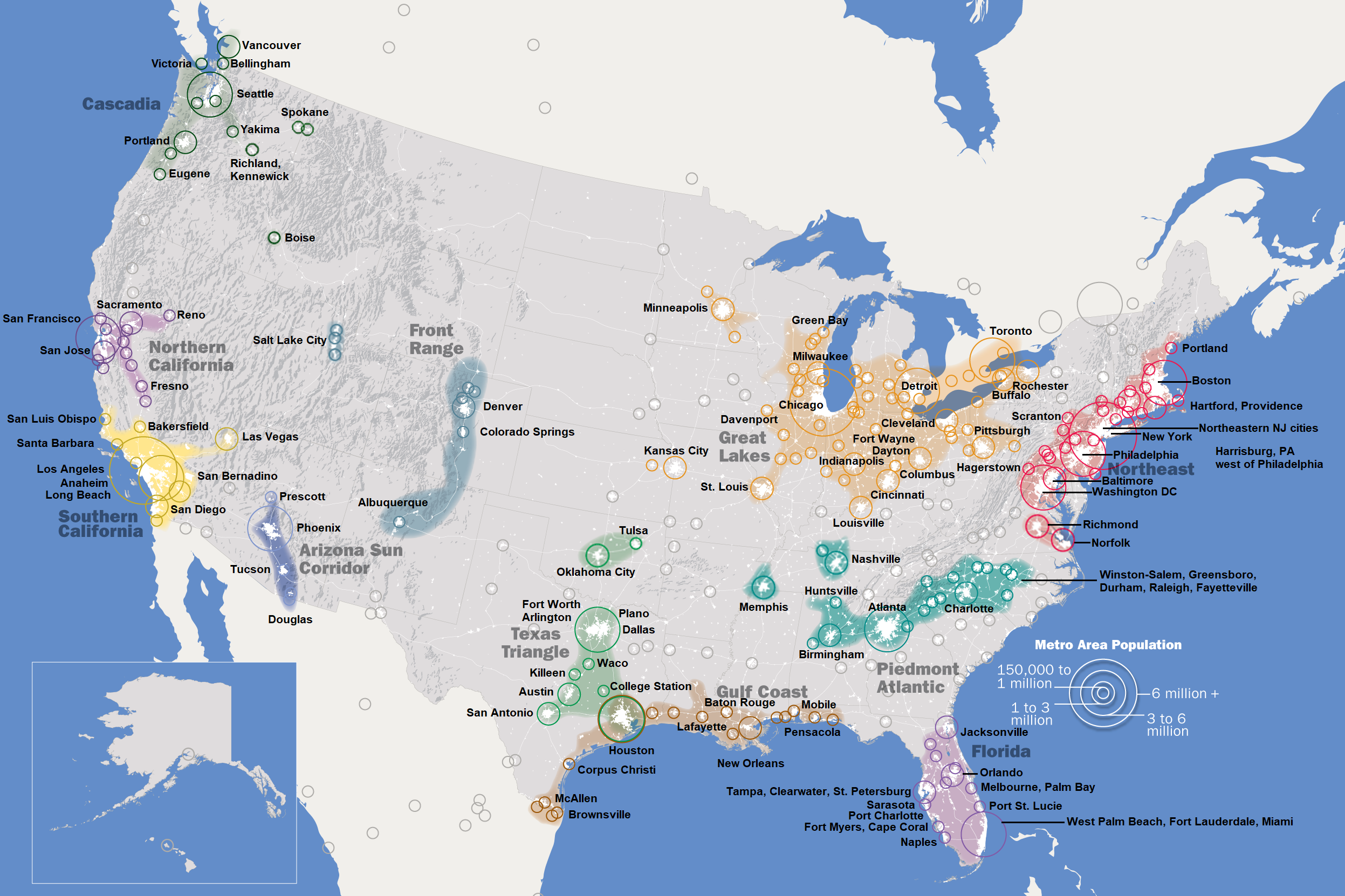
Regional Plan Association map of the United States showing the 11 U.S. and transborder (with Canada & Mexico) megaregions

The 11 emerging megaregions identified by the RPA are:

- Arizona Sun Corridor Megaregion (extends into Mexico).
- Cascadia Megaregion (Pacific Northwest; shared with Canada). The RPA definition of this region does not include the Boise metropolitan area in Idaho, though it is included in some definitions of the Pacific Northwest. (The Boise area is removed by hundreds of miles from any other area included in the RPA's definition of "Cascadia".)
- Florida Megaregion. The megaregion does not cover the entire state; it excludes the Panhandle and several mostly rural counties to its east. The Pensacola–Navarre and Fort Walton Beach areas in the far west of the Panhandle are instead included in the Gulf Coast Megaregion.
- Southern Rocky Mountain Megaregion. The northern end of this megaregion starts in the Colorado–Wyoming area typically called the Front Range Urban Corridor, then extends south following the Interstate 25 corridor along the eastern face of the Rocky Mountains to the range's southernmost extent in New Mexico, incorporating the Santa Fe and Albuquerque metropolitan areas. Naturally, the RPA definition does not include the Wasatch Front of Utah, which is detached from Denver by more than five hundred miles, as well as by the Wasatch, Uinta, and Rocky Mountain ranges; RPA instead numbers Salt Lake City among such cities as Oklahoma City, Boise, and Spokane, which do not belong to a discrete 'megaregion'.
- Great Lakes Megaregion. This megalopolis extends into Canada, whose geographers, by including Ottawa, Montreal and Quebec City, take a more inclusive approach than the American RPA when defining the Canadian section of the region. The RPA definition of the American portion of the region includes the geographically detached metropolitan areas of Minneapolis–St. Paul, St. Louis, and Kansas City.
- Gulf Coast Megaregion. The RPA definition of this region includes the entirety of two metropolitan areas that straddle the Mexico–United States border, specifically Matamoros–Brownsville and Reynosa–McAllen.
- Northeast Megaregion. The United States' original "megalopolis" (sometimes called the "Boston-Washington corridor") stretches from Boston, Massachusetts (in the northeast extremity), through New York City, to Philadelphia, and Baltimore, to Washington, D.C. (in the southern extremity). The RPA definition also includes the farther-south Richmond metropolitan area and the Virginia portion of Hampton Roads.
- Northern California Megaregion. The RPA definition includes the Nevada portion of Lake Tahoe, as well as the entire Truckee Meadows including Reno.
- Piedmont Atlantic Megaregion. The term "Piedmont Atlantic Megaregion" (PAM) is a neologism created by the Regional Plan Association for an area of the Southeastern United States that includes the Atlanta, Birmingham, Bowling Green, Greenville-Spartanburg-Anderson, South Carolina, Asheville, Charlotte, Memphis, Nashville, Research Triangle (Raleigh–Durham–Chapel Hill), and Greensboro–Winston-Salem–High Point metropolitan areas.
- Southern California Megalopolis. The RPA definition includes the Las Vegas Valley, as well as the Tijuana area in Mexico.
- Texas Triangle Megaregion. The RPA definition does include the geographically detached Oklahoma City–Tulsa Metropolitan Corridor in Oklahoma.

== Identification ==
The Regional Plan Association methodology for identifying the emerging megaregions included assigning each county a point for each of the following:

- It was part of a core-based statistical area;
- Its population density exceeded 200 people per square mile as of the 2000 census;
- The projected population growth rate was expected to be greater than 15 percent and total increased population was expected to exceed 1,000 people by 2025;
- The population density was expected to increase by 50 or more people per square mile between 2000 and 2025; and
- The projected employment growth rate was expected to be greater than 15 percent and total growth in jobs was expected to exceed 20,000 by 2025.

=== Shortcomings of the RPA method ===
This methodology was much more successful at identifying fast-growing regions with existing metropolitan centers than more sparsely populated, slower growing regions. Nor does it include a distinct marker for connectedness between cities. The RPA method omits the eastern part of the Windsor-Quebec City urban corridor in Canada.

== Statistics (RPA estimate) ==
Megalopolis Name	Population in millions 2010	Percent of U.S. Population (2010)	Population in millions 2025 (projected)	Population percent growth 2010 - 2025 (projected)	Major cities and metro areas
Arizona Sun Corridor	5.6	2%	7.8	39.3%	Chandler, Mesa, Phoenix, Tucson, Nogales
Cascadia	12.4	4%	13.5	8.2%	Abbotsford, Boise**, Eugene, Portland (OR), Salem, Seattle, Tacoma, Spokane**, Tri-Cities**, Vancouver (BC), Vancouver (WA), Victoria
Florida Megaregion	17.3	6%	21.5	24.3%	Fort Lauderdale, Jacksonville, Miami, Orlando, Port St. Lucie, Tampa Bay Area (Tampa–St. Petersburg–Clearwater), West Palm Beach
Front Range	5.5	2%	6.9	26%	Albuquerque, Cheyenne, Colorado Springs, Denver, Pueblo.
Great Lakes	55.5	18%	60.7	9.4%	Buffalo, Chicago, Cincinnati, Cleveland, Columbus, Detroit, Erie, Fox Cities**, Grand Rapids, Hamilton, Indianapolis, Kansas City**, Louisville, Madison, Milwaukee, Minneapolis–Saint Paul**, Montreal**, Ottawa**, Pittsburgh, Quebec City**, Rochester (MN)**, Rochester (NY), Sarnia, Sault Ste. Marie**, Niagara Falls, St. Louis, Sudbury, Syracuse, Toledo, Toronto, Twin Ports**, Wheeling, Windsor
Gulf Coast	13.4	4%	16.3	21.6%	Baton Rouge, Beaumont–Port Arthur, Corpus Christi, Gulfport–Biloxi, Houston, Lafayette, Lake Charles, Mobile, New Orleans, Pensacola, Navarre
Northeast	52.3	17%	58.4	11.7%	Atlantic City, Baltimore, Boston, Brookhaven, Bridgeport, Danbury, Hampton Roads (Virginia Beach, Norfolk), Harrisburg, Hempstead, Islip, Jersey City, Lehigh Valley (Allentown-Bethlehem-Easton), Newark, New Haven, New York, Norwalk, Oyster Bay, Paterson, Philadelphia, Portland (ME), Providence, Richmond, Knowledge Corridor (Springfield and Hartford), Stamford, Trenton, Washington, Waterbury, Wilmington, Worcester, Yonkers
Northern California	14	5%	16.4	17.1%	Fresno, Modesto, Berkeley, Oakland, Reno, Sacramento, San Francisco, San Jose, Stockton, Vallejo
Piedmont Atlantic	17.6	6%	21.7	23.3%	Atlanta, Birmingham, Charlotte, Chattanooga, Greenville, Huntsville, Jonesboro, Knoxville**, Memphis**, Montgomery, Nashville**, Piedmont Triad (Greensboro–Winston-Salem), Research Triangle (Raleigh–Durham-Chapel Hill), Tuscaloosa
Southern California	24.4	8%	29	18.9%	Anaheim, Bakersfield, Inland Empire (San Bernardino–Riverside), Las Vegas, Long Beach, Los Angeles, San Diego, Tijuana
Texas Triangle	19.7	6%	24.8	25.9%	Austin, Dallas–Fort Worth, Houston, San Antonio, Oklahoma City**, Tulsa**

Notes:

- Houston appears twice (as part of Gulf Coast and Texas Triangle).
- The populations given for megalopolises that extend into Canada and Mexico (Arizona Sun Corridor, Cascadia, Great Lakes, and Southern California) include their non-U.S. residents.
- Disconnected metropolitan areas (as defined by the RPA) are flagged with double asterisks (**). Disconnected areas in the upper Great Lakes region and southern Quebec are not included in RPA statistics.

== Major cities and areas not included by the RPA ==
Seventeen of the top 100 American primary census statistical areas are not included in any of the 11 emerging mega-regions. However, the Lexington-based CSA in Kentucky is identified by the RPA as being part of an "area of influence" of the Great Lakes megalopolis, while the Albany and Syracuse-based CSAs in Upstate New York are shown as being within the influence of the Northeastern mega-region. Similarly, the Augusta, GA and Columbia, SC-based CMA are considered influenced by the Piedmont-Atlantic megalopolis, Jackson, MS CMA by the Gulf Coast megaregion, Little Rock, AR CMA by the Texas Triangle, and the Des Moines and Omaha-based CMAs by the Great Lakes megalopolis. The El Paso, TX CMA is roughly equidistant from two megaregions, being near the southeastern edge of the Arizona Sun Corridor area of influence and the southern tip of the Front Range area of influence. This leaves Salt Lake City, UT, Honolulu, HI, Oklahoma City, OK, Tulsa, OK, Wichita, KS, Boise, ID, Spokane, WA, Springfield, MO and Charleston, SC as the top 100 American CMAs that have no mega-region affiliation of any kind as defined by the RPA.

Hawaii	Honolulu, HI MSA
Kansas	Wichita, KS MSA
Kentucky	Lexington-Fayette-Frankfort-Richmond, KY CSA
Mississippi Valley	Des Moines-Newton-Pella, IA CSA, Omaha-Council Bluffs-Fremont, NE-IA CSA, Little Rock-North Little Rock-Conway, AR CSA, Jackson-Yazoo City, MS CSA, Wichita-Winfield, KS CSA
Mountain West	Salt Lake City-Provo-Orem, UT-ID CSA, Boise–Mountain Home–Ontario, ID–OR CSA, Spokane–Coeur d'Alene, WA-ID CSA
Missouri	Springfield, MO MSA
South Atlantic Coast	Charleston-North Charleston-Summerville, SC MSA, Augusta-Richmond County, GA-SC MSA, Savannah, GA, Columbia, SC
Southwest	El Paso, TX MSA (see also El Paso-Juárez), Oklahoma City, OK MSA
Upstate New York	Syracuse-Auburn, NY CSA, Albany-Schenectady-Amsterdam, NY CSA

== Planning ==
Though identification of the megaregions has gone through several iterations, the above identified are based on a set of criteria developed by Regional Plan Association, through its America 2050 initiative - a joint venture with the Lincoln Institute of Land Policy. Two historic publications helped lay the foundation for this new set of criteria, the book Megalopolis by Jean Gottmann (1961) and The Regions' Growth, part of Regional Plan Association's second regional plan.

The relationships underpinning megaregions have become more pronounced over the second half of the 20th century as a result of decentralized land development, longer daily commutes, increased business travel, and a more footloose, flexible, knowledge workforce. The identification of new geographic scales—historically based on increased population movement from the city center to lower density areas as a megaregion presents immense opportunities from a regional planning perspective, to improve the environmental, infrastructure and other issues shared among the regions within it. The most recent and only previous attempt to plan at this scale happened more than 70 years ago, with the Tennessee Valley Authority. Political issues stymied further efforts at river basin planning and development.

In 1961's Megalopolis, Gottman describes the Northeastern seaboard of the United States - or Megapologis - as "... difficult to single out ... from surrounding areas, for its limits cut across established historical divisions, such as New England and the Middle Atlantic states, and across political entities, since it includes some states entirely and others only partially." On the complex nature of this regional scale, he writes:

Some of the major characteristics of Megalopolis, which set it apart as a special region within the United States, are the high degree of concentration of people, things and functions crowded here, and also their variety. This kind of crowding and its significance cannot be described by simple measurements. Its various aspects will be shown on a number of maps, and if these could all be superimposed on one base map there would be demarcated an area in which so many kinds of crowding coincide in general (though not always in all the details of their geographical distribution) that the region is quite different from all neighboring regions and in fact from any other part of North America. The essential reason for its difference is the greater concentration here of a greater variety of kinds of crowding. Crowding of population, which may first be expressed in terms of densities per square mile, will, of course, be a major characteristic to survey. As this study aims at understanding the meaning of population density, we shall have to know the foundation that supports such crowding over such a very vast area. What do these people do? What is their average income and their standard of living? What is the distribution pattern of wealth and of certain more highly paid occupations? For example, the outstanding concentration of population in the City of New York and its immediate suburbs (a mass of more than ten million people by any count) cannot be separated from the enormous concentration in the same city of banking, insurance, wholesale, entertainment, and transportation activities. These various kinds of concentration have attracted a whole series of other activities, such as management of large corporations, retail business, travel agencies, advertising, legal and technical counseling offices, colleges, research organizations, and so on. Coexistence of all these facilities on an unequaled scale within the relatively small territory of New York City, and especially of its business district...has made the place even more attractive to additional banking, insurance, and mass media organizations.

in the US, megaregions have been garnering more attention at the federal level. In 2016, the United States Department of Transportation (USDOT) awarded The University of Texas at Austin a five-year grant to lead a consortium under the University Transportation Centers (UTC) program, called Cooperative Mobility for Competitive Megaregions (CM^{2}). The center aims to advance research, education, and technology transfer initiatives to improve the mobility of people and goods in urban and rural communities of megaregions. In addition, the Transportation Research Board (a division of the National Research Council of the United States), listed "megaregions" in two of its "Critical Issues in Transportation 2019" Policy Snapshot reports.

== Outside of the United States ==
The RPA report identifies megaregions that are shared between the US and Canada, and is presumably at least tangentially concerned with pan-North American issues. However, being based on largely American research, it does not clearly define the geographic extent of megaregions where they extend into Canada, a responsibility that has largely been left to Canadian geographers defining the megalopolis within their own country. The American report excludes Canadian population centers that are not deemed to be closely adjacent to US megaregions. It includes most of Southern Ontario in the Great Lakes Megaregion but excludes the St. Lawrence Valley, despite the fact that Canadian geographers usually include them as part of one larger Quebec City-Windsor Corridor.

The close relationship between large linked metropolitan regions and a nation's ability to compete in the global economy is recognized in Europe and Asia. Each has aggressively pursued strategies to manage projected population growth and strengthen economic prosperity in its large regions.

The European Spatial Development Perspective, a set of policies and strategies adopted by the European Union in 1999, is working to integrate the economies of the member regions, reduce economic disparities, and increase economic competitiveness (Faludi 2002; Deas and Lord 2006).

In East Asia, comprehensive strategic planning for large regions, centered on metropolitan areas, has become increasingly common and has progressed further than in the United States or Europe. Planning for the Guangdong–Hong Kong–Macao Greater Bay Area, for instance, aims to enhance the region's economic strength and competitiveness by overcoming local fragmentation, building on global economic cooperation, taking advantage of mutually beneficial economic factors, increasing connectivity among development nodes, and pursuing other strategic directions.

== See also ==
- Amalgamation (politics)
- Combined Statistical Area
- Conurbation
- Consolidated city-county
- Ecumenopolis
- Megacity
- Megalopolis (city type)
- Metropolis
- Metropolitan Statistical Area
- Micropolitan Statistical Area
