= Florida Megaregion =

Megaregion of the United States

- Megaregion of the United States
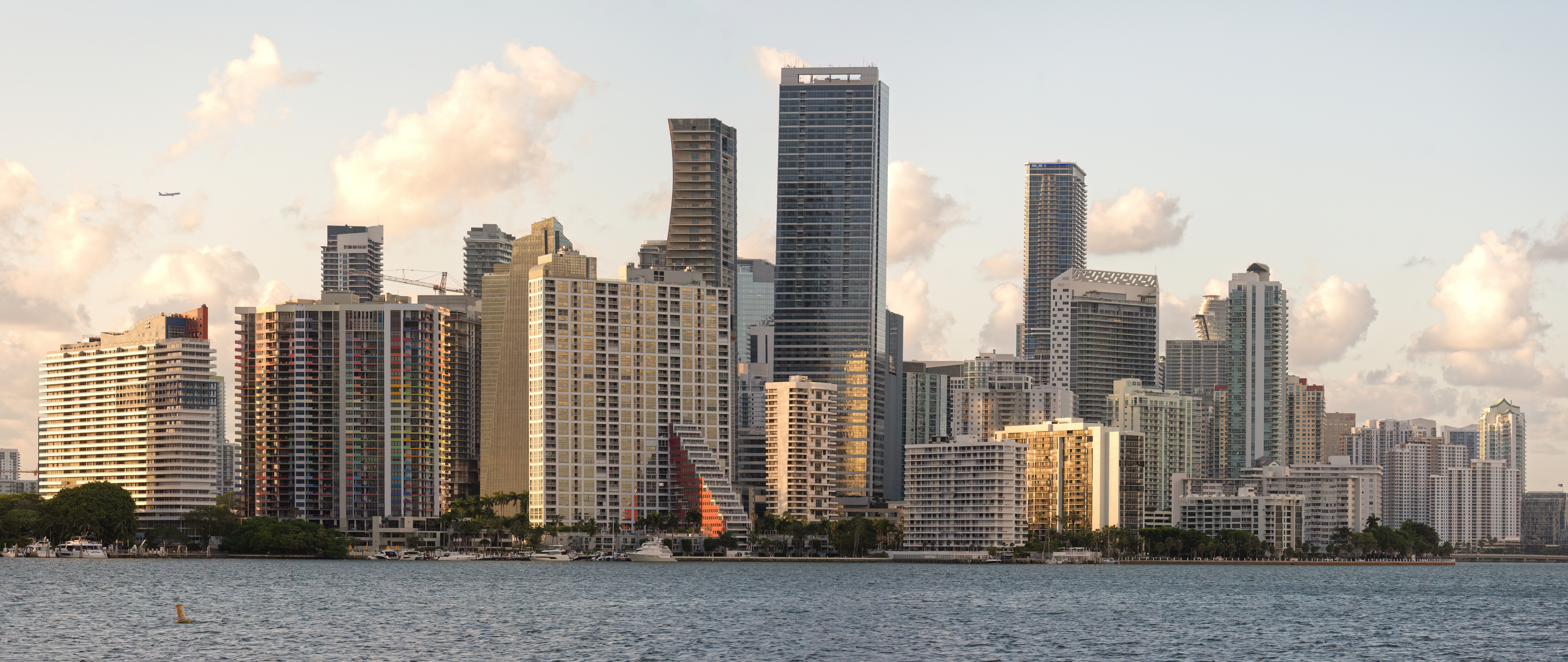
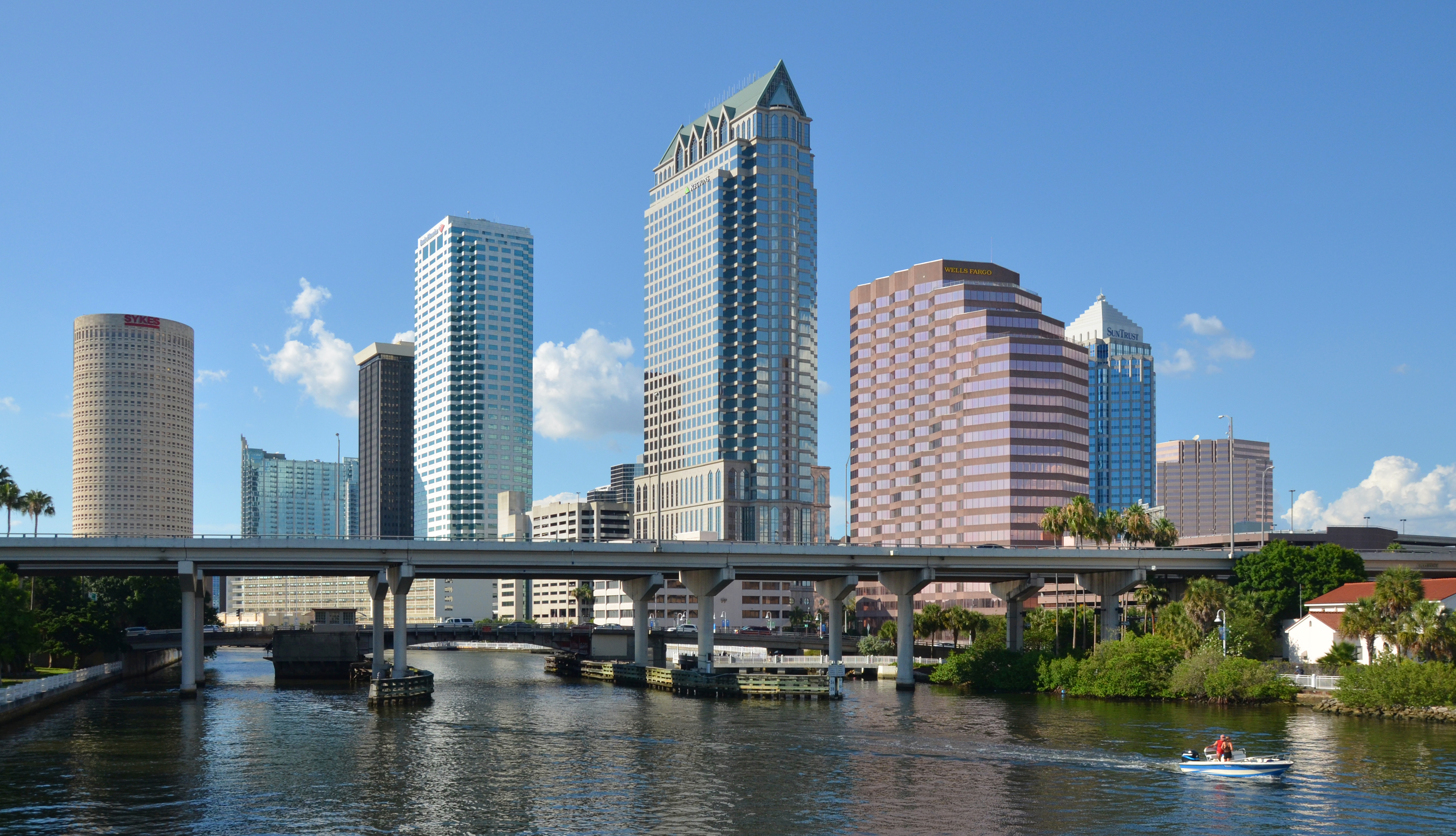
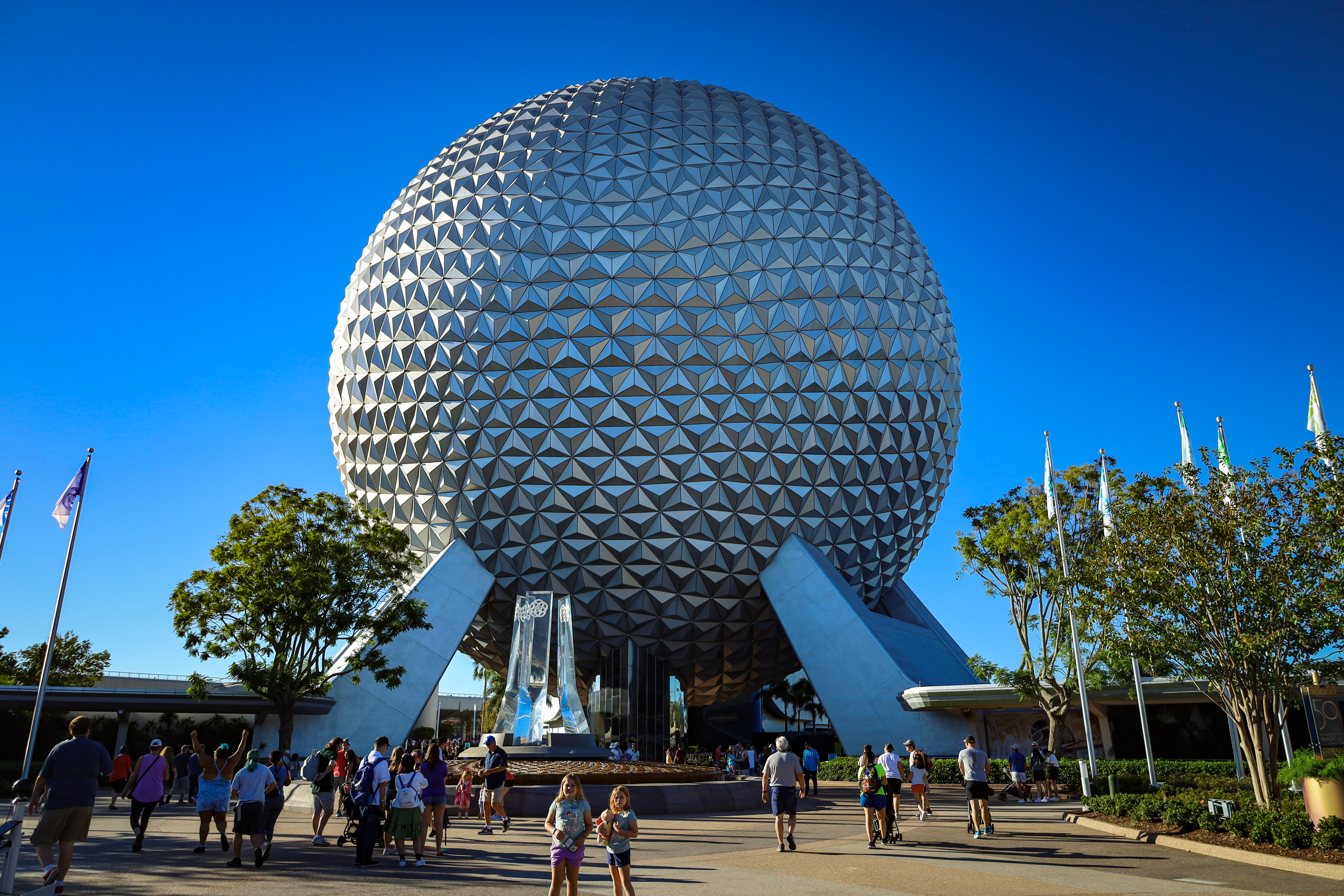
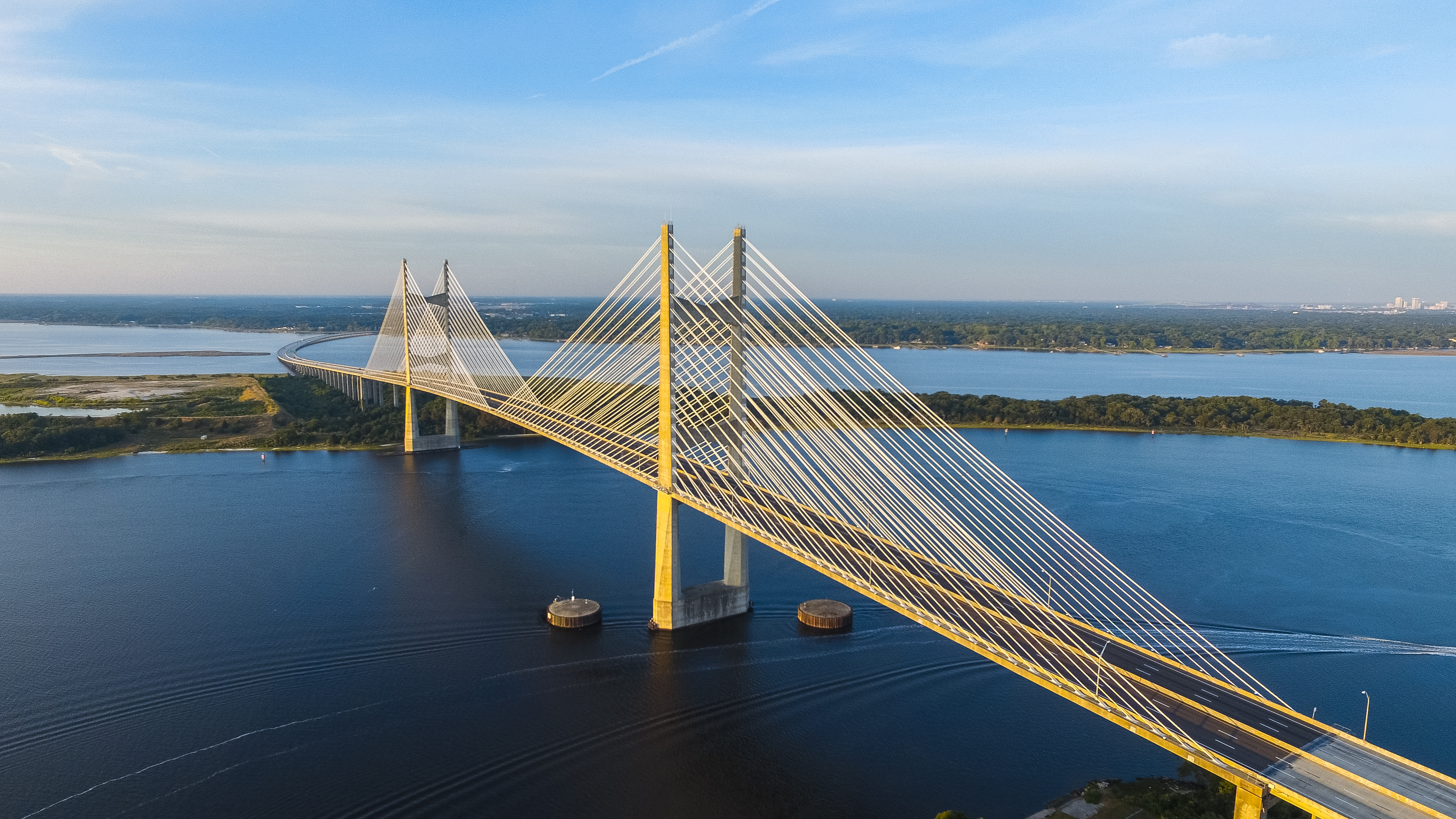
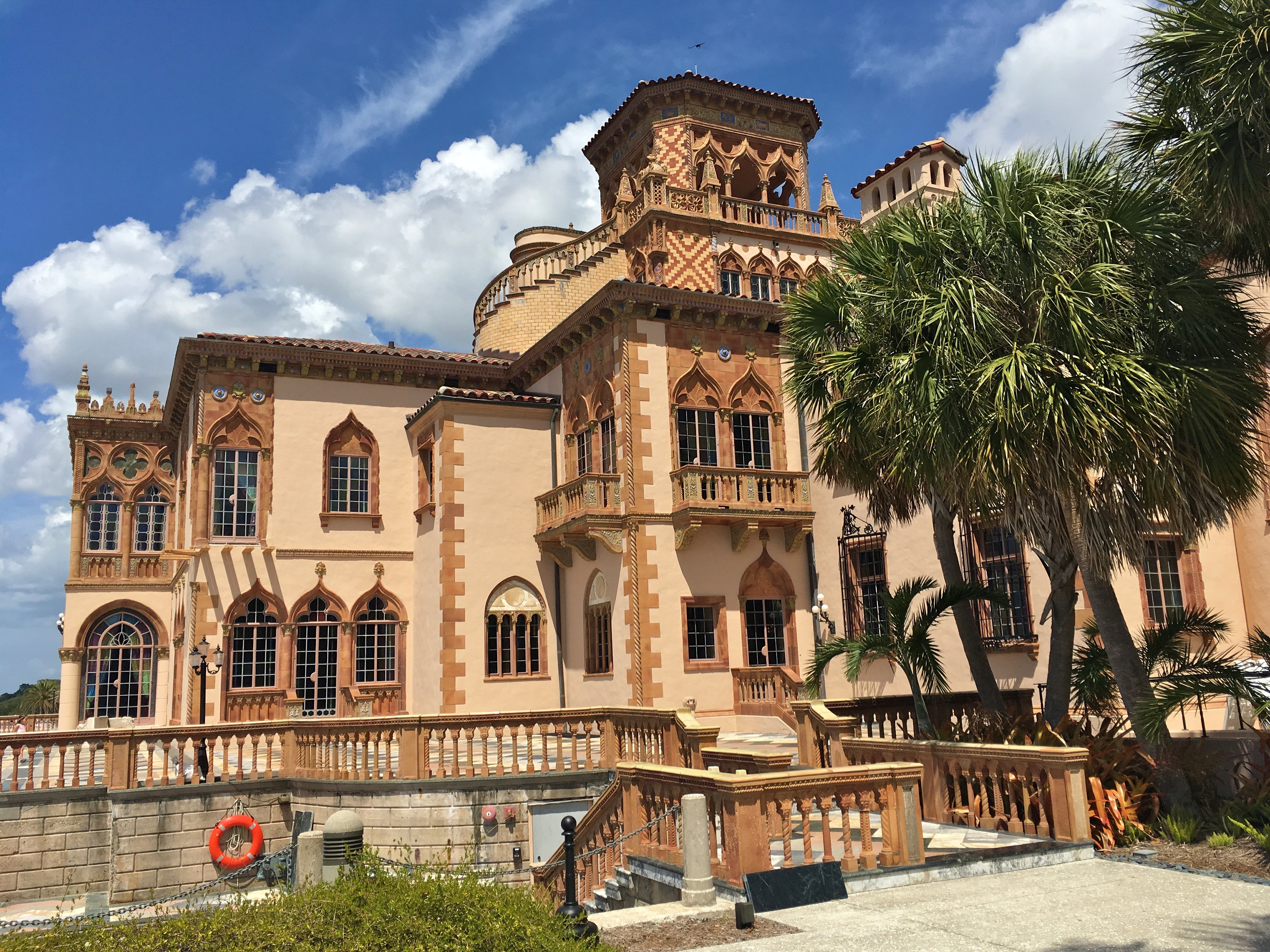
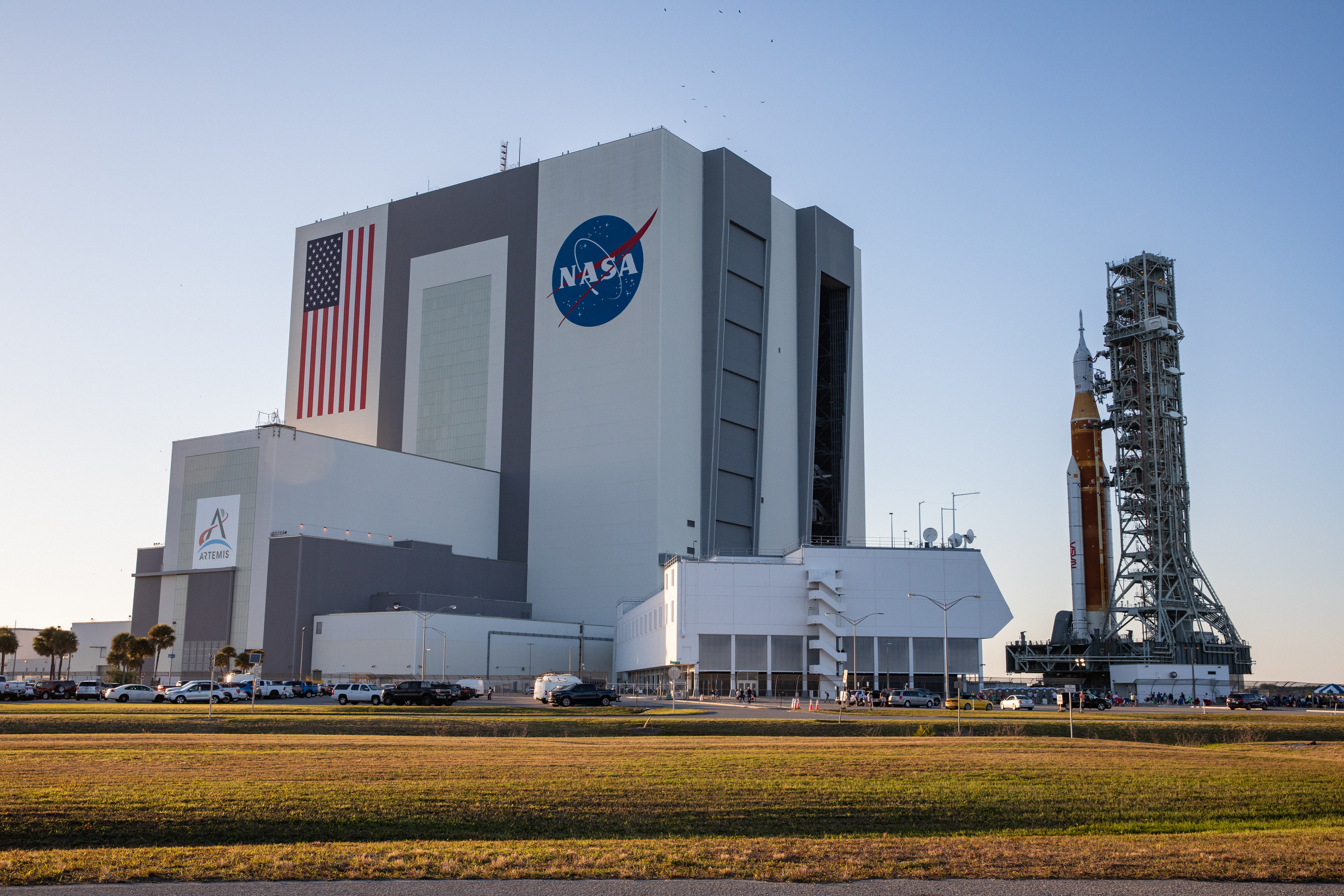
- Landmarks of the Florida Megaregion (from top to bottom): Brickell skyline in Miami, Downtown Tampa, Epcot Center, Walt Disney World near Orlando, Dames Point Bridge in Jacksonville, Ca' d'Zan, John and Mable Ringling Museum of Art in Sarasota, Vehicle Assembly Building at Kennedy Space Center
Interactive map of the Florida megaregion
Miami–Port St. Lucie–Fort Lauderdale CSA
Tampa–St. Petersburg Area
Orlando–Lakeland–Deltona CSA
Jacksonville–Kingsland–Palatka CSA
North Central Florida (Gainesville, Ocala)
Palm Bay–Melbourne–Titusville MSA
North Port–Bradenton, FL CSA
Cape Coral–Fort Myers–Naples, FL CSA
Non-metropolitan counties in the megaregion
- States: Florida
- Largest cities (over 200,000 pop): Jacksonville; Miami; Tampa; Orlando; St. Petersburg; Port St. Lucie; Hialeah; Cape Coral

The Florida Megaregion is one of the eleven megaregions of the United States, as identified by the Regional Plan Association (RPA) through its America 2050 initiative. It encompasses a network of metropolitan areas along the east coast of Florida, including Miami and Jacksonville, as well as across the Interstate 4 corridor including Tampa and Orlando.

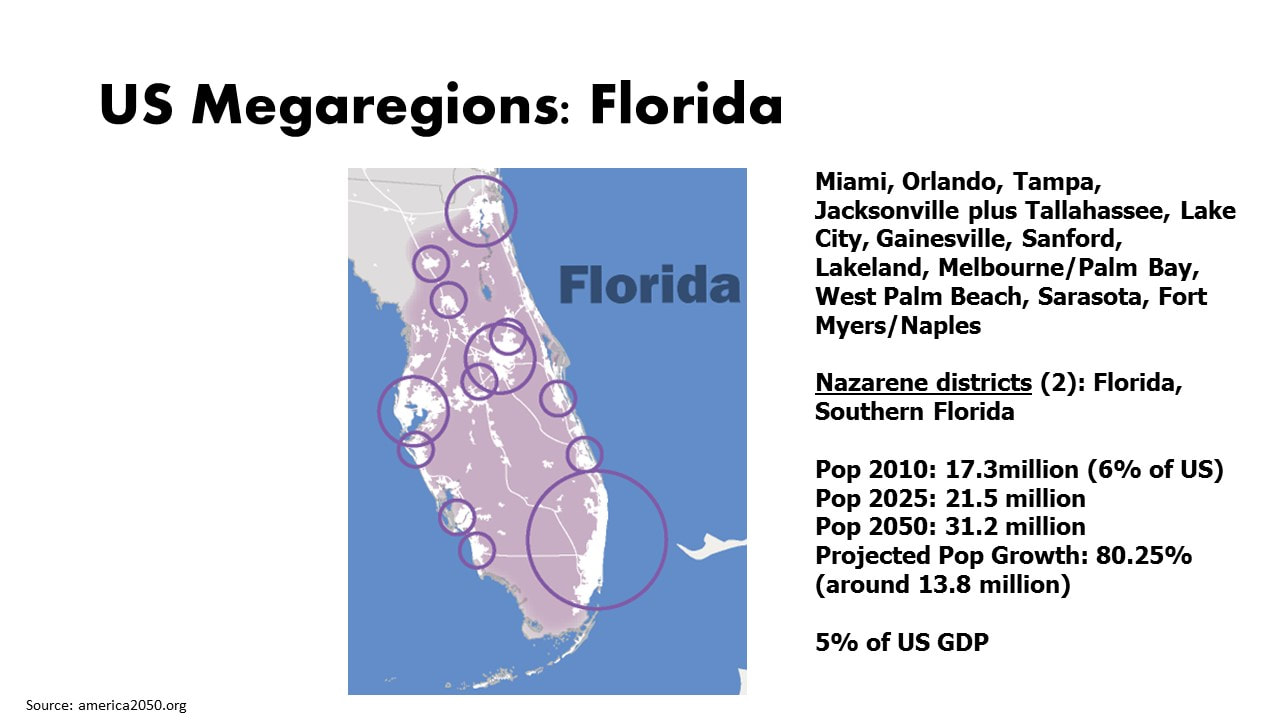

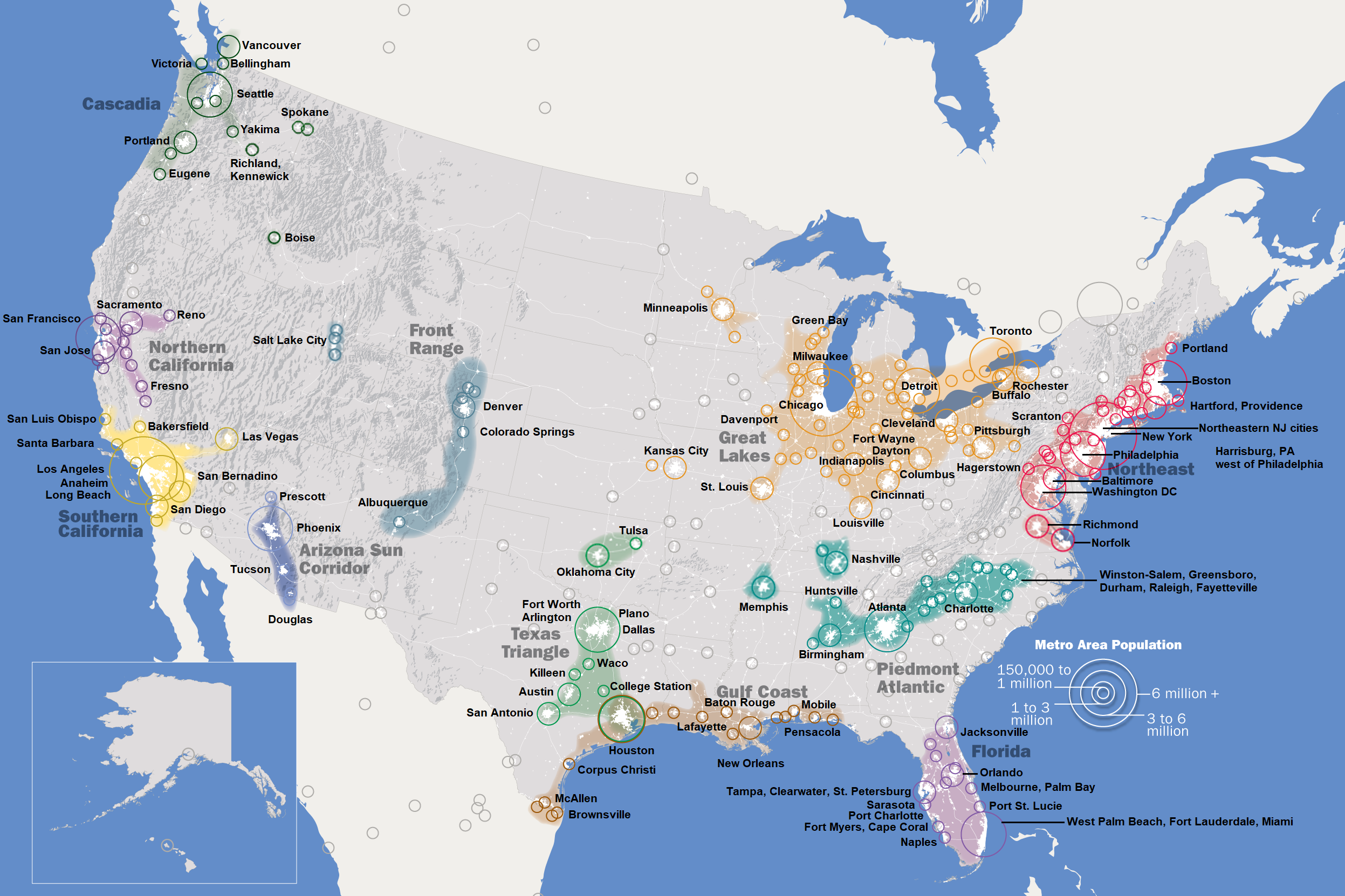

== Definition ==
The boundaries of the Florida Megaregion typically exclude the Florida Panhandle, with areas such as Pensacola–Navarre and Fort Walton Beach treated as part of the Gulf Coast Megaregion. The megaregion spans numerous counties, including but not limited to Miami-Dade, Broward, Palm Beach, Orange, Hillsborough, Duval, Pinellas, and Polk, covering a mix of urban, suburban, and exurban areas.

== Population and geography ==
The Florida Megaregion is one of the most populous urban regions in the United States, with an estimated population of approximately 21.5 million as of 2023, of which 17.3 million reside in its core metropolitan statistical areas: Miami-Fort Lauderdale-West Palm Beach, Orlando-Kissimmee-Sanford, Tampa-St. Petersburg-Clearwater, and Jacksonville. The region has experienced significant population growth, driven by domestic and international migration, particularly to South Florida and the Interstate 4 (I-4) corridor. Miami-Dade County alone accounts for nearly 2.7 million residents, while the Tampa and Orlando metropolitan areas each contribute over 3 million.

Geographically, the Florida Megaregion spans approximately 35,000 square miles across southern and central Florida, encompassing a network of counties including Miami-Dade, Broward, Palm Beach, Orange, Hillsborough, Pinellas, Polk, Brevard, Lee, Seminole, Osceola, Duval and Collier, among others.

== Economy ==
Metropolitan areas of Miami, Orlando, Tampa, and Jacksonville anchor this megaregion and generate significant economic output. Combined, they contribute an estimated $1.5 trillion to the U.S. gross domestic product (GDP) as part of the broader megaregional framework identified by the Regional Plan Association.

Tourism is a primary economic driver, with attractions such as Walt Disney World, Universal Studios, and SeaWorld in Orlando drawing over 75 million visitors annually. Miami's South Beach, the Everglades, and cultural events like Art Basel further bolster tourism in South Florida. In Tampa, Busch Gardens is a major driver of tourism, while Jacksonville hosts large scale events such as The Players Championship and the Florida-Georgia game.

Agriculture remains vital, particularly in counties like Polk and Palm Beach, where citrus, sugar cane, and winter vegetables are major exports.
