= Arizona Sun Corridor =

Megaregion in Arizona, United States

- Megaregion
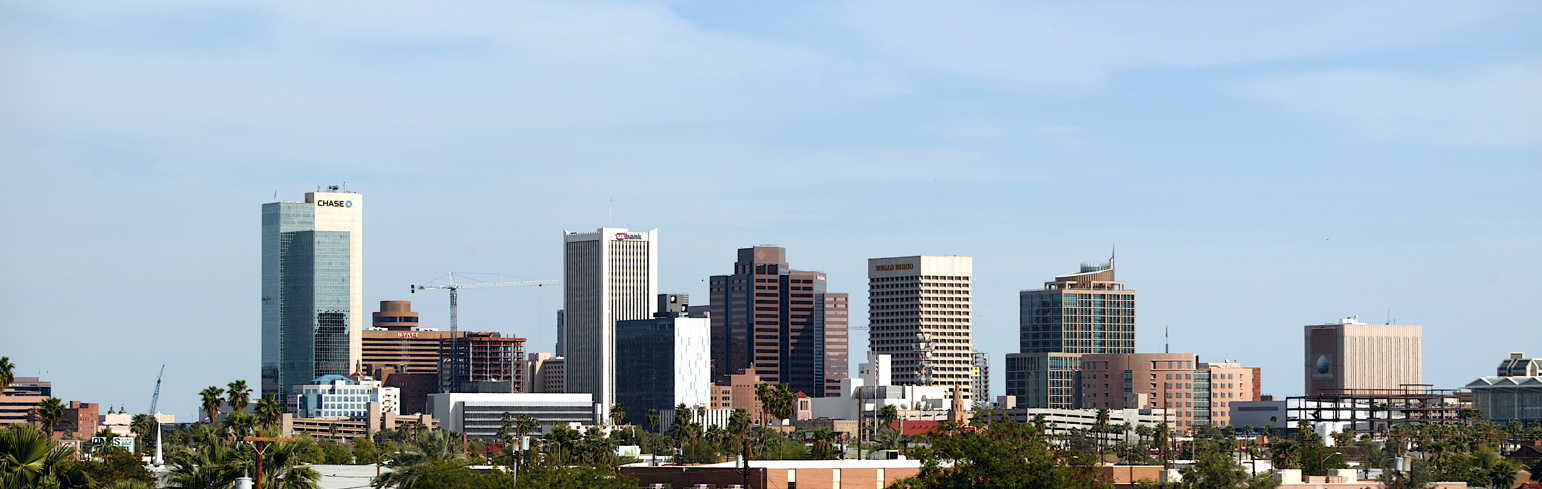
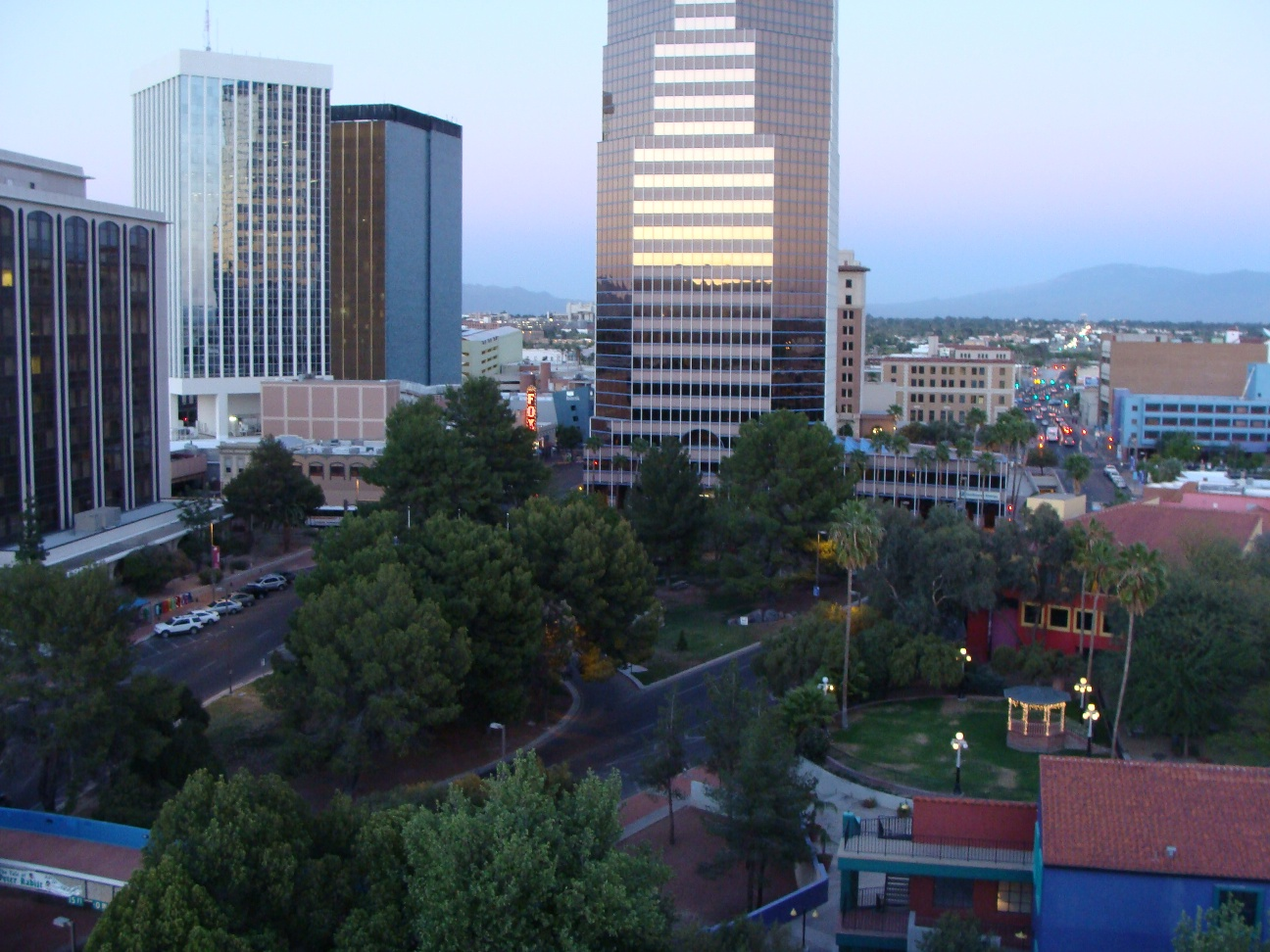
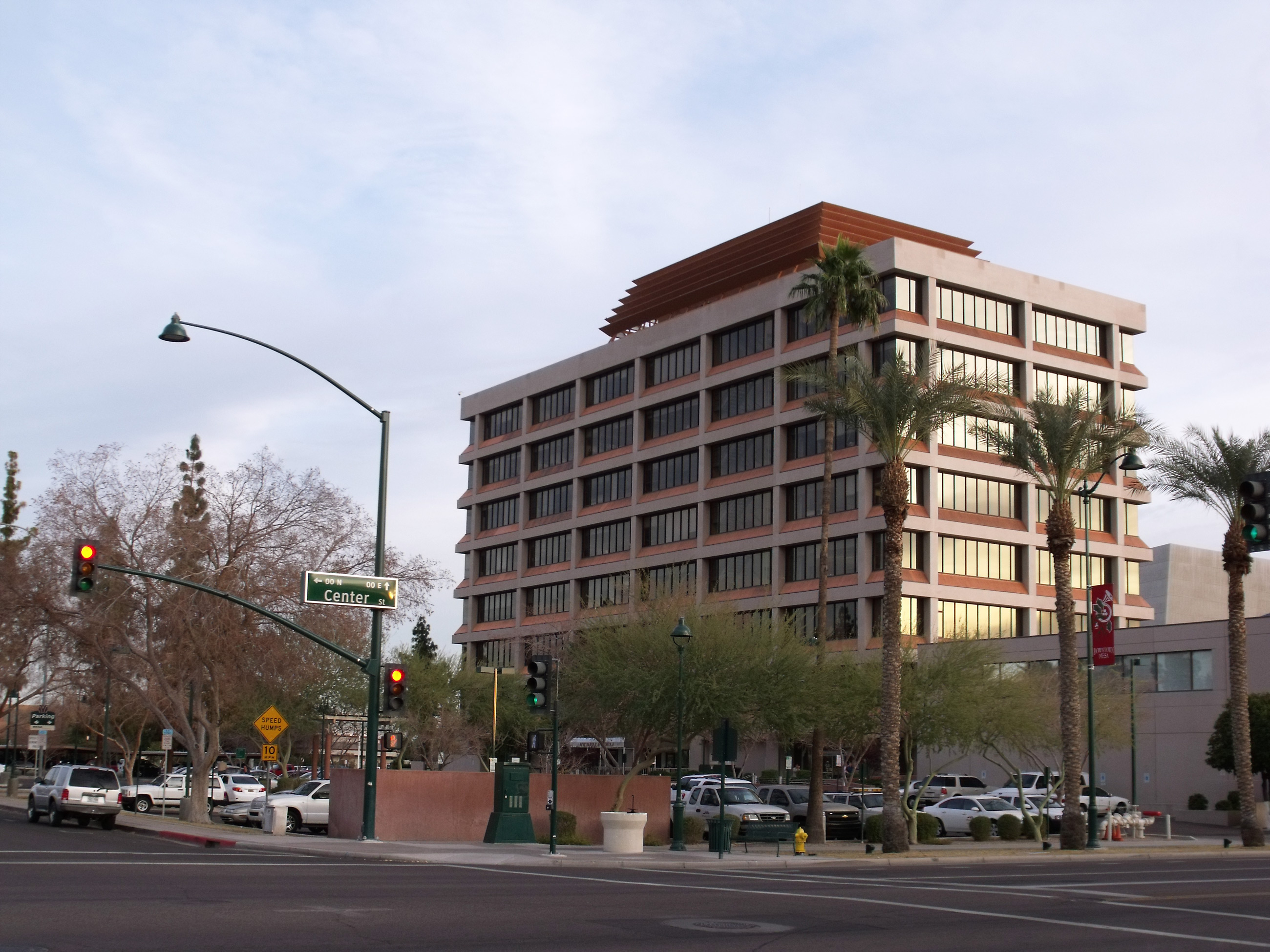
- Counter-clockwise from top: Downtown Phoenix skyline, Downtown Tucson, Mesa City Hall
Interactive Map of Arizona Sun Corridor Megaregion
Phoenix–Mesa–Chandler MSA
Tucson MSA
Prescott Valley–Prescott MSA
Sierra Vista–Douglas MSA
Payson µSA
Nogales µSA
- Country: United States
- State: Arizona

Population (2010)
  - Total: 5,517,131
  - Rank: 10th
  - 2040 Projection: 10,100,000

The Arizona Sun Corridor, shortened Sun Corridor, is a megaregion, or megapolitan area, in the southern area of the U.S. state of Arizona. It comprises approximately 85 percent of the state's population. The Sun Corridor is comparable to Indiana in both size and population. It is one of the fastest growing conurbations in the country. The largest metropolitan areas are the Phoenix metropolitan area (Valley of the Sun), and the Tucson metropolitan area (The Old Pueblo). The regions' populace is nestled in the valley of a desert environment. Similar to Southern California, the urban area extends into Mexico, reaching the communities of Heroica Nogales and Agua Prieta.

Its population is composed of five metropolitan areas: Phoenix, Tucson, Prescott, Sierra Vista-Douglas and Nogales. Of these, two are metropolitan areas with over 1,000,000 residents: the Phoenix metropolitan area with 4.85 million residents and the Tucson metropolitan area with over 1 million residents. The Arizona Sun Corridor is made up of all of Maricopa, Pinal and Pima counties, along with parts of Yavapai, Santa Cruz and Cochise counties. It is home to over 86 percent of Arizona's population.

Most of the Arizona Sun Corridor is in the Sonoran Desert. To the south of the region is the border between the United States and Mexico, and to the north and east is the Arizona transition zone and the Mountains of Arizona. The Southern California Megaregion is to the west and is the nearest other Megaregion to the Arizona Sun Corridor.

== Extent ==
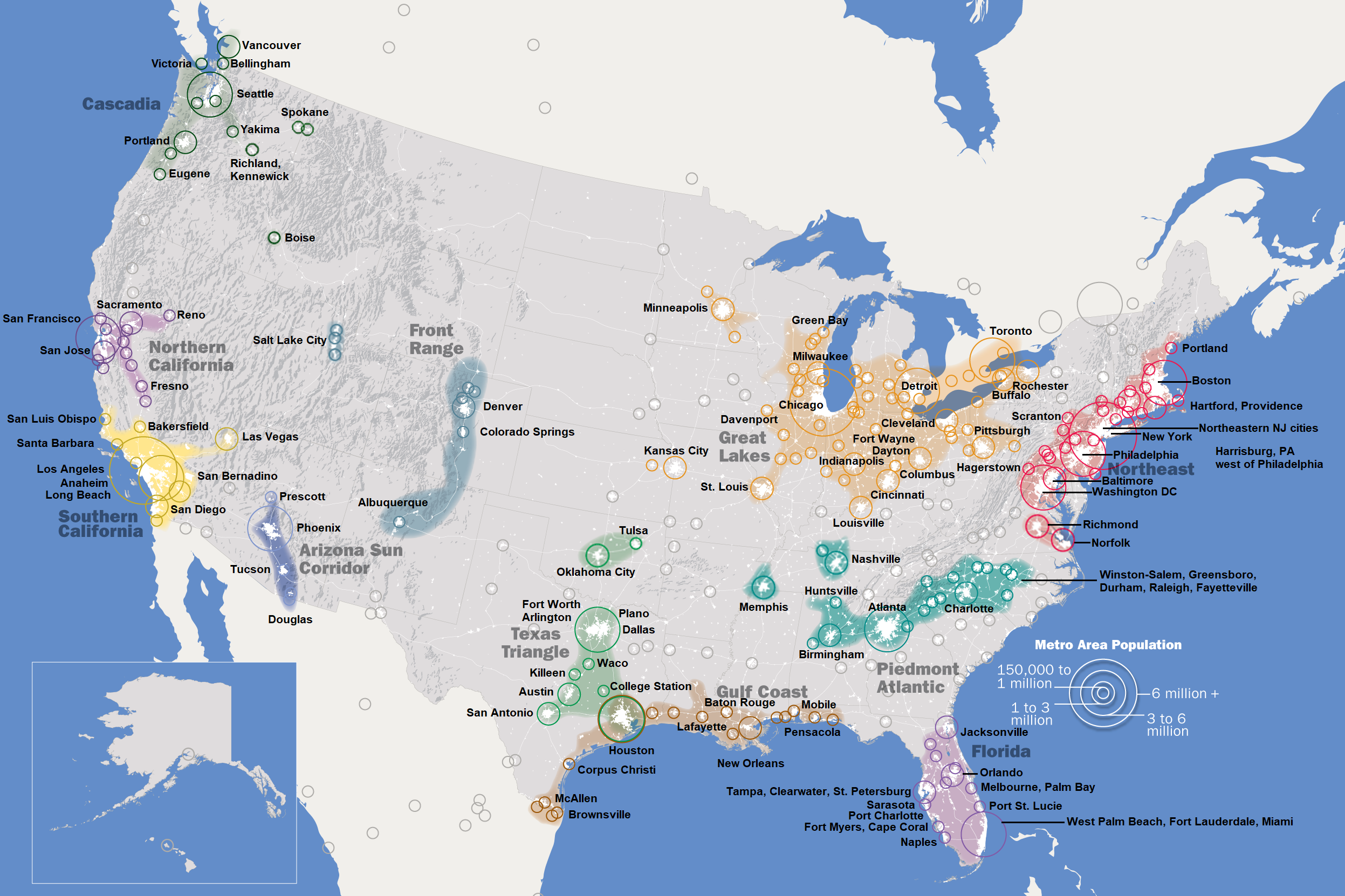
The Arizona Sun Corridor lies in the American Southwest.

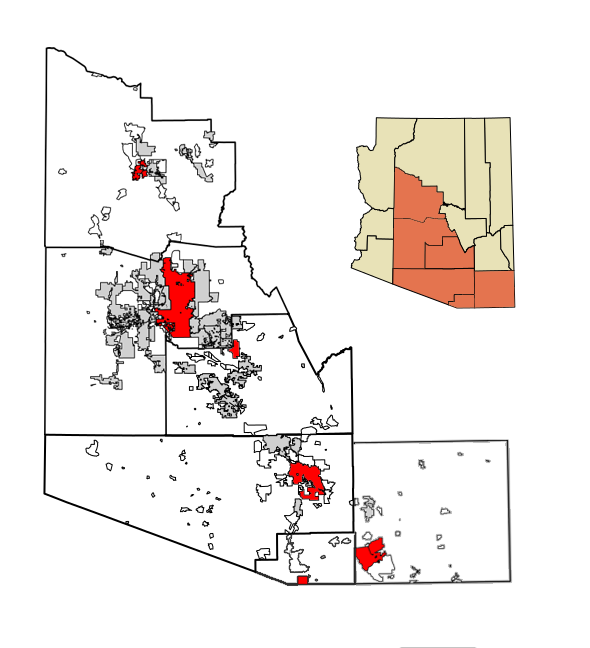
Map of the Arizona Sun Corridor, showing each county in the Sun Corridor, as well as their cities, towns, and CDPs. The largest community in each county is highlighted in red.

The Arizona Sun Corridor lies in the American Southwest, about halfway between the Southern California and Front Range Megaregions. It is shown on the map in deep blue.

Below is a table listing all communities of the Arizona Sun Corridor with a population of at least 20,000 residents.

Name	Type	County	Population (2020)	Land Area		Population density (2010)	
Name	Type	County	Population (2020)	sq mi	km^{2}	/sq mi	/km^{2}
Anthem	CDP	Maricopa	23,190				
Apache Junction	City	Pinal	38,499	35.0	90.6	1,024.2	395.4
Avondale	City	Maricopa	89,334	45.7	118.4	1,672.0	645.6
Buckeye	City	Maricopa	91,502	375.4	972.3	135.6	52.4
Casa Grande	City	Pinal	53,658	109.7	284.1	442.9	171.0
Casas Adobes	CDP	Pima	70,973				
Catalina Foothills	CDP	Pima	52,401				
Chandler	City	Maricopa	275,987	64.5	167.1	3,665.8	1,415.4
Drexel Heights	CDP	Pima	27,523				
El Mirage	City	Maricopa	35,805	10.1	26.2	3,170.7	1,224.2
Flagstaff	City	Coconino	76,831	66.1	171.2	1,136.5	438.8
Florence	Town	Pinal	26,785	52.5	136.0	486.9	188.0
Fountain Hills	Town	Maricopa	23,820	20.4	52.8	1,106.2	427.1
Gilbert	Town	Maricopa	267,918	68.2	176.6	3,067.2	1,184.3
Glendale	City	Maricopa	248,325	60.1	155.7	3,780.2	1,459.5
Goodyear	City	Maricopa	95,294	191.5	496.0	340.9	131.6
Green Valley	CDP	Pima	22,616				
Marana	Town	Pima	51,908	122.2	316.5	287.8	111.1
Maricopa	City	Pinal	58,125	47.6	123.3	916.0	353.7
Mesa	City	Maricopa	504,258	137.1	355.1	3,217.5	1,242.3
Oro Valley	Town	Pima	47,070	35.6	92.2	1,154.3	445.7
Peoria	City	Maricopa	190,985	178.0	461.0	883.4	341.1
Phoenix	City	Maricopa	1,608,139	518.0	1,341.6	2,797.8	1,080.2
Prescott	City	Yavapai	45,827	41.6	107.7	963.8	372.1
Prescott Valley	Town	Yavapai	46,785	38.7	100.2	1,004.4	387.8
Queen Creek	Town	Maricopa	59,519	28.1	72.8	940.1	363.0
Rio Rico	CDP	Santa Cruz	20,549				
San Tan Valley	CDP	Pinal	99,894				
Sahuarita	Town	Pima	34,134	31.0	80.3	813.8	314.2
Scottsdale	City	Maricopa	241,361	184.4	477.6	1,182.0	456.4
Sierra Vista	City	Cochise	45,308	152.5	395.0	288.2	111.3
Sun City	CDP	Maricopa	39,931				
Sun City West	CDP	Maricopa	25,806				
Surprise	City	Maricopa	143,148	105.9	274.3	1,111.3	429.1
Tempe	City	Maricopa	180,587	40.2	104.1	4,050.1	1,563.8
Tucson	City	Pima	542,629	227.0	587.9	2,294.2	885.8

== Transportation ==
=== Road ===
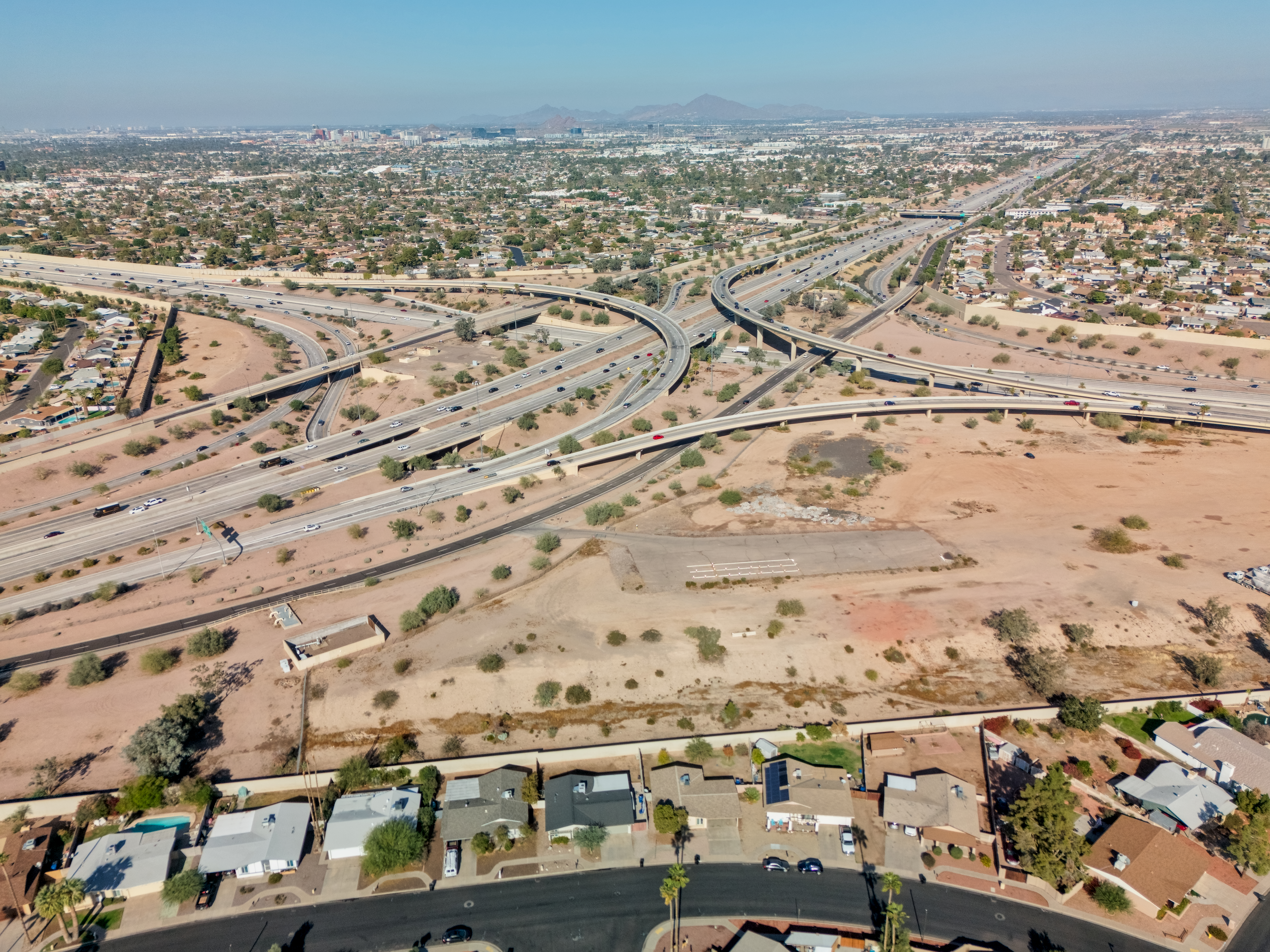
Loop 101 and US 60 interchange in Tempe

Intercity in the region is provided by the I-8, I-10, I-17, and I-19 freeways, as well as US 60, SR 87, SR 90, and SR 77, among other surface highways.

Phoenix area arterials are set up in a grid pattern, which helps simplify transportation within the region. Tucson's streets have a similar system.

=== Rail ===
Amtrak's Sunset Limited operates three times a week, connecting Maricopa, Arizona and Tucson. There is no other intercity rail in the region; however Phoenix–Tucson passenger rail is in the planning phase.

Intracity rail systems include the Valley Metro Rail, which operates within the Phoenix metropolitan area, connecting Uptown and Downtown Phoenix with Tempe and Mesa, and Tucson's Sun Link streetcar system, which links Downtown Tucson and the Mercado district to the University of Arizona.

=== Air ===
Phoenix Sky Harbor International Airport and Tucson International Airport provide air transportation to the region, from both within the country and from a few foreign countries, among other smaller airports, which focus on regional air traffic from nearby. Recently, Phoenix-Mesa Gateway Airport, previously being a military base, has also become an option for low-cost carriers to fly into the Phoenix area as well.

US Airways, now owned by Fort Worth company American Airlines, was once headquartered and based in Tempe after a reverse-merger from America West Airlines in 2005, headquarters of which is in the Phoenix Valley. However, American Airlines maintains a strong presence in the state due to the history with US Airways.
