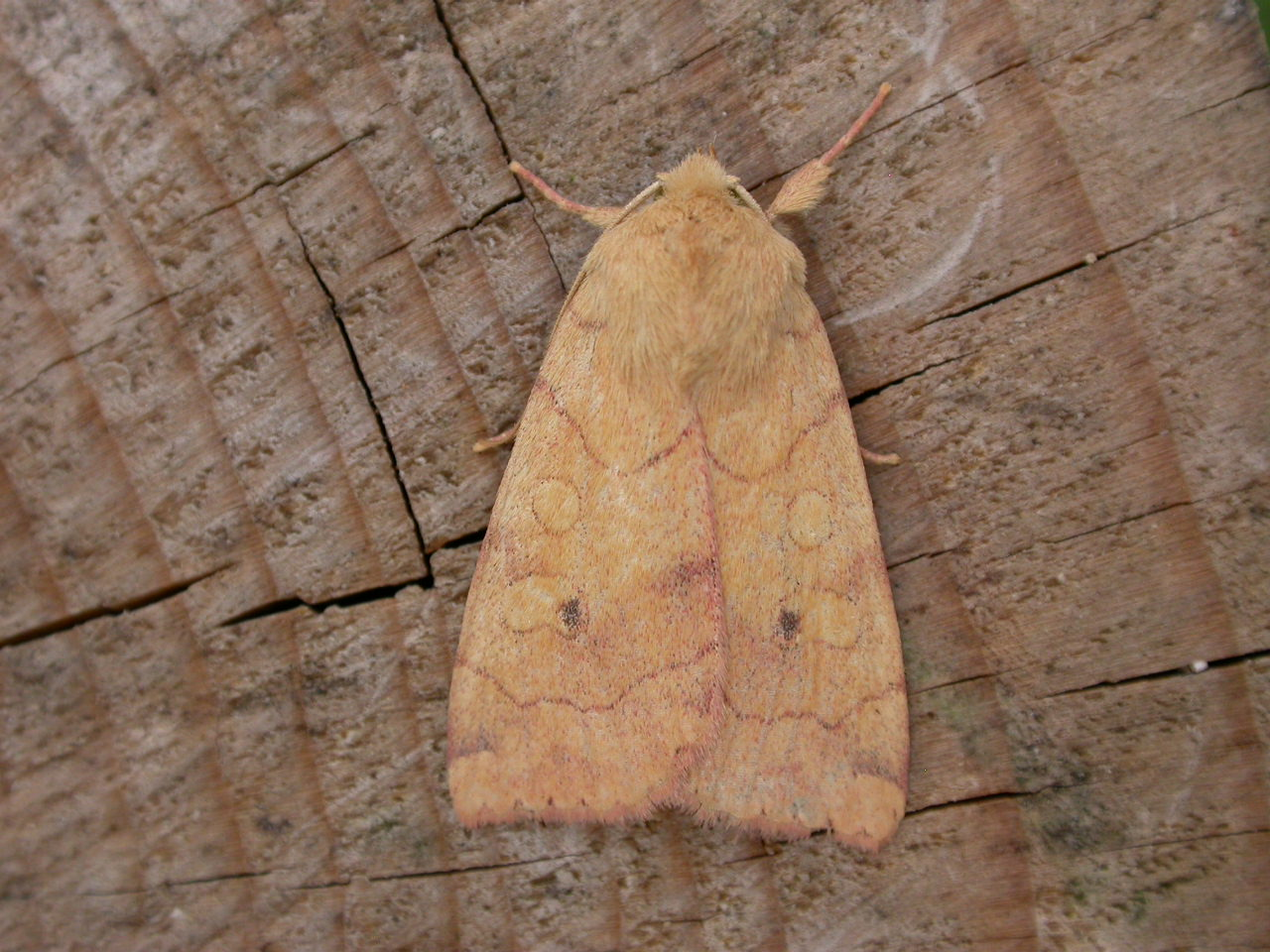

Scientific classification
- Domain: Eukaryota
- Kingdom: Animalia
- Phylum: Arthropoda
- Class: Insecta
- Order: Lepidoptera
- Superfamily: Noctuoidea
- Family: Noctuidae
- Genus: Enargia
- Species: E. paleacea

Binomial name
- Enargia paleacea (Esper, 1788)

Synonyms
- Phalaena paleacea; Noctua paleacea; Noctua angulago; Noctua fulvago

= Enargia paleacea =

Species of moth

Enargia paleacea, the angle-striped sallow, is a moth of the family Noctuidae. It is found in the Palearctic realm from Ireland to Siberia East to Japan.

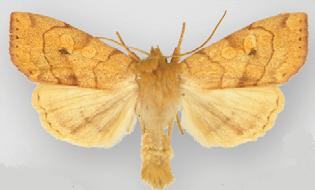
Male

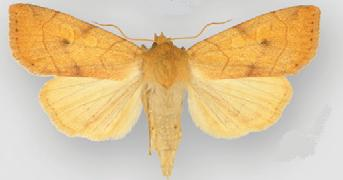
Female

== Description ==
The wingspan is 40–60 mm. Forewing pale yellowish ochreous, dusted with rufous; the female deeper yellow than the male; inner and outer lines fine, reddish brown; median shade reddish-brown, more diffuse, angulated: subterminal line hardly marked; orbicular and reniform stigmata outlined with reddish brown, the lower lobe of reniform filled up with grey; a series of dark terminal spots; hindwing whitish yellow: ab. angulago Haw. is deep orange instead of pale yellow: teichi Krul. occurring in Germany and W. Russia has the space, between inner and outer lines or between median and submarginal suffused with reddish grey or brown.

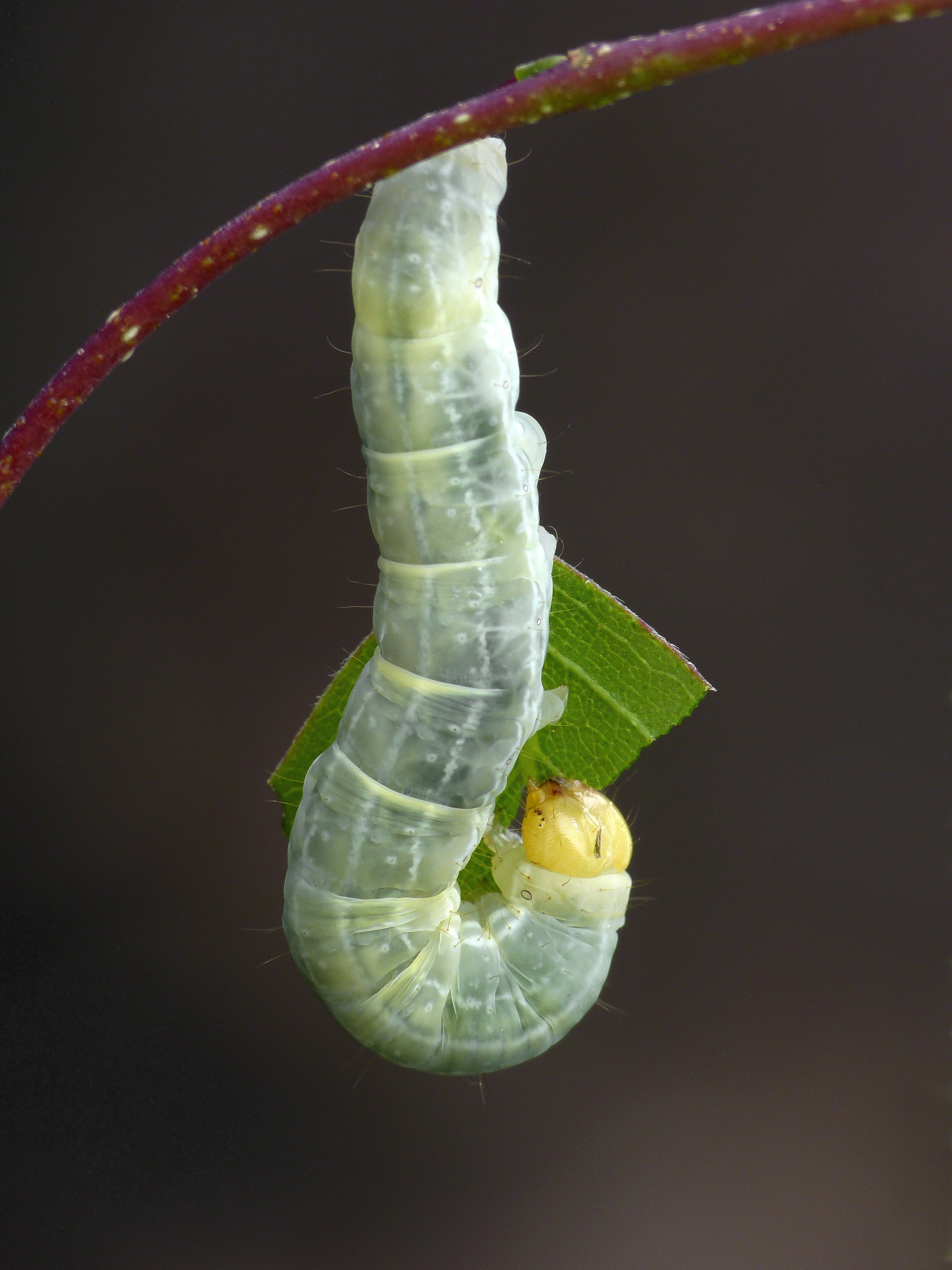
larva

== Biology ==
The moth flies from June to October depending on the location.

The larvae feed on birch and sometimes Populus tremula.
