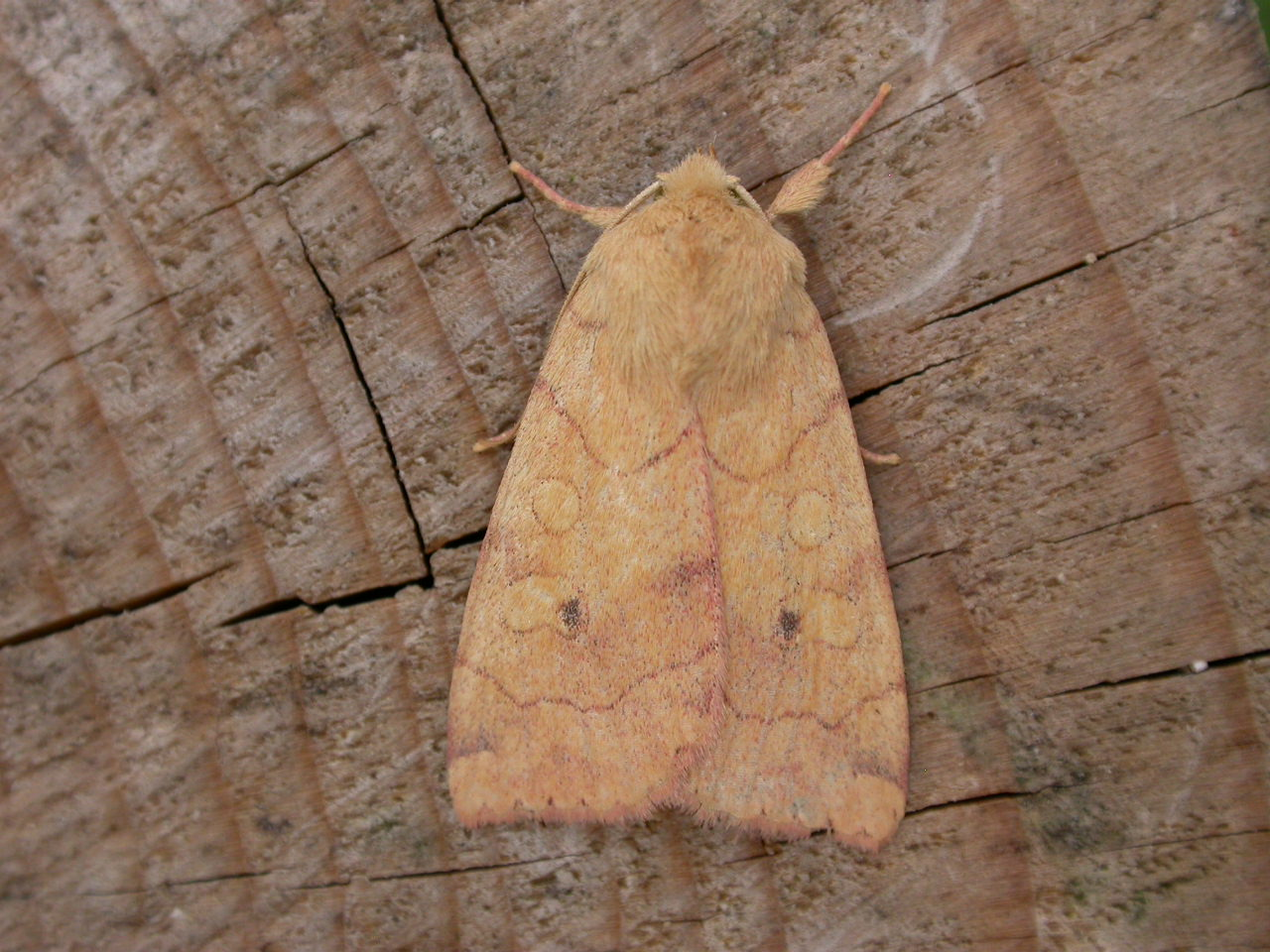
- Enargia paleacea

Scientific classification
- Kingdom: Animalia
- Phylum: Arthropoda
- Clade: Pancrustacea
- Class: Insecta
- Order: Lepidoptera
- Superfamily: Noctuoidea
- Family: Noctuidae
- Tribe: Caradrinini
- Genus: Enargia; Hübner, 1821

= Enargia =

Genus of moths

Enargia is a genus of moths of the family Noctuidae.

== Species ==
- Enargia abluta Hübner, 1808
- Enargia fausta Schmidt, 2010
- Enargia flavata Wileman & West
- Enargia contecta Graeser, 1892
- Enargia fuliginosa Draudt, 1950
- Enargia infumata (Grote, 1874)
- Enargia kansuensis Draudt, 1935
- Enargia paleacea Esper, 1788
- Enargia pinkeri de Freina & Hacker, 1985
- Enargia staudingeri Alphéraky, 1882
- Enargia jordani Rothschild, 1920
- Enargia decolor Walker, 1858
