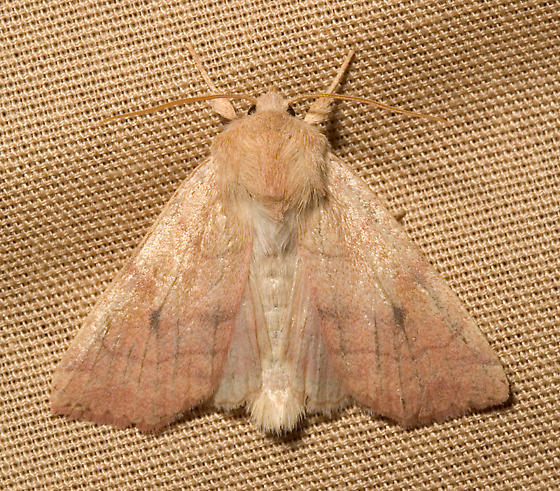

Scientific classification
- Kingdom: Animalia
- Phylum: Arthropoda
- Class: Insecta
- Order: Lepidoptera
- Superfamily: Noctuoidea
- Family: Noctuidae
- Genus: Enargia
- Species: E. infumata

Binomial name
- Enargia infumata (Grote, 1874)

Synonyms
- Orthosia infumata Grote, 1874; Cosmia punctirena Smith, 1900; Enargia mephisto Franclemont, 1939

= Enargia infumata =

Species of moth

Enargia infumata, the lesser eyed sallow, is a moth of the family Noctuidae. It is found from Alaska and New Brunswick to Ontario, south to Connecticut in eastern North America. In western North America it is found from Saskatchewan and Alberta, south to Utah and California.

Sexual dimorphism

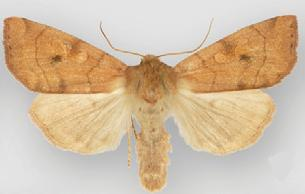
Male

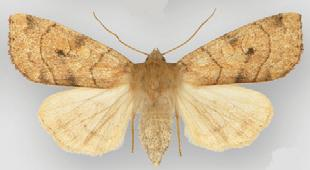
Female

Adults are on wing from June to September. There is one generation per year.

The larvae feed on the leaves of Populus species and perhaps other willow and birch species.
