= Southern Rocky Mountain Front =

- Megaregion of the United States
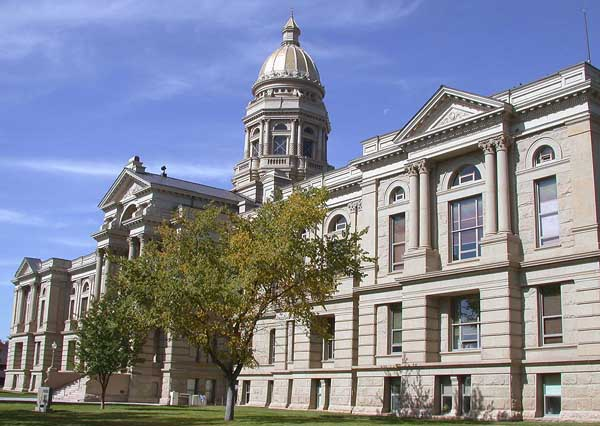
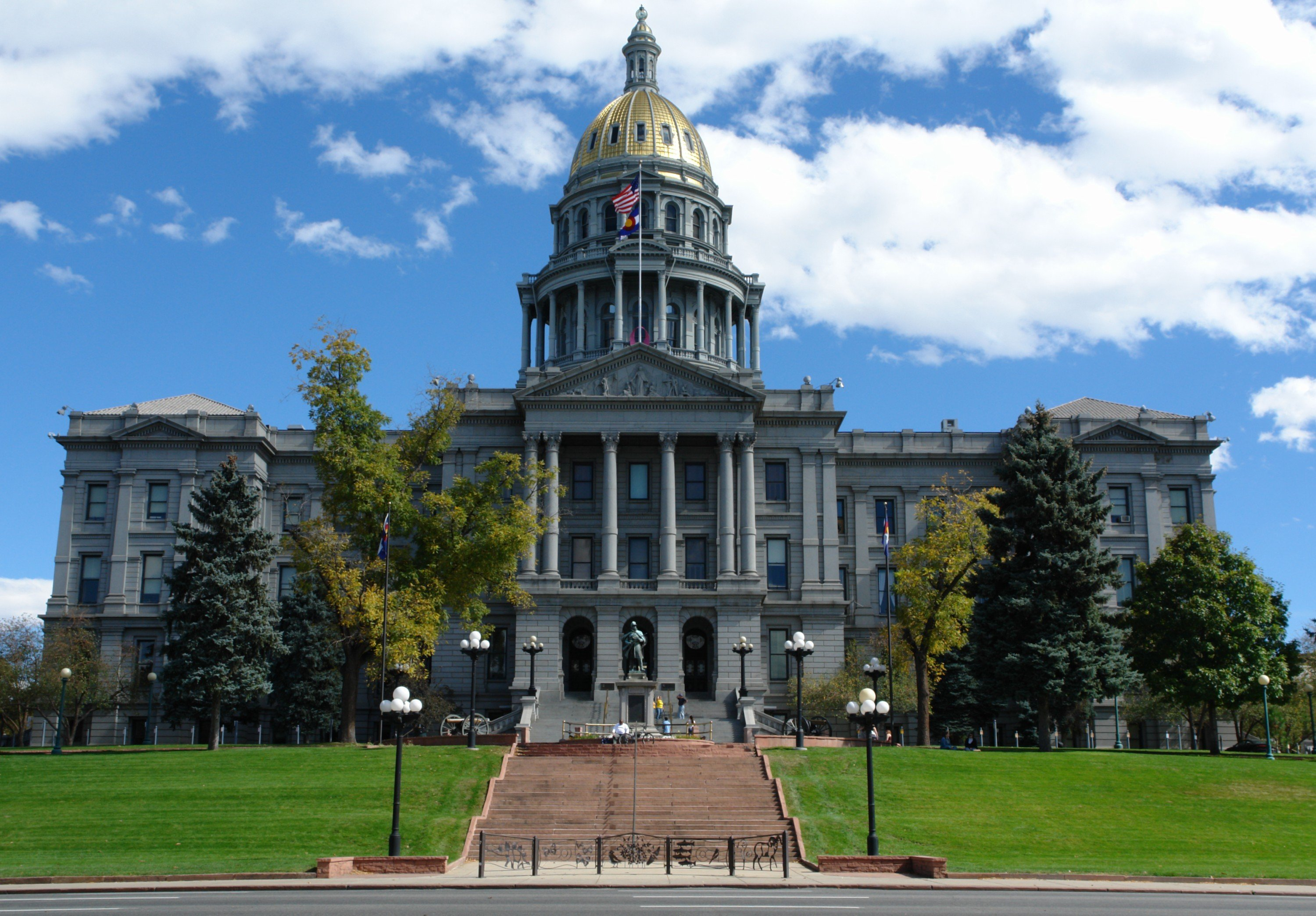
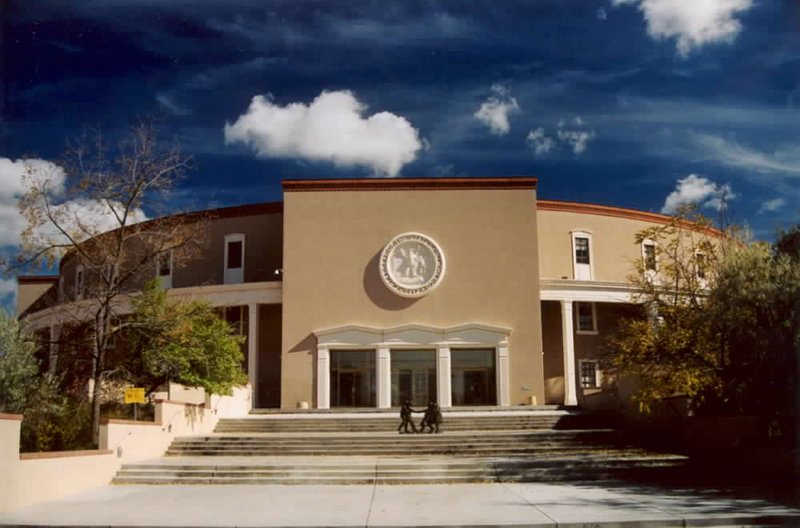
- State capitols in the megaregion (from top to bottom); Wyoming State Capitol in Cheyenne; Colorado State Capitol in Denver; New Mexico State Capitol in Santa Fe
Interactive map of the Front Range urban corridor of
Colorado and Wyoming
City and County of Denver
Denver–Aurora–Centennial, CO MSA
Boulder, CO MSA
Greeley, CO MSA
Fort Collins, CO MSA
Colorado Springs, CO MSA
Pueblo, CO MSA
Cañon City, CO µSA
Cheyenne, WY MSA
- Country: United States
- States: Wyoming; Colorado; New Mexico
- Largest city: Denver
- Other principal cities: - Aurora; - Lakewood; - Thornton; - Boulder; - Greeley; - Longmont; - Fort Collins; - Colorado Springs; - Pueblo; - Cheyenne, WY

Population
  - Total: 5,467,633
- Time zone: UTC−7 (MST)
  - Summer (DST): UTC−6 (MDT)

The Southern Rocky Mountain Front is a megaregion of the United States, otherwise known as a megalopolis, with population centers consisting mainly of the Front Range Urban Corridor and the Albuquerque–Santa Fe–Los Alamos combined statistical area, located along the eastern and southern face of the Southern Rocky Mountains in the U.S. states of Wyoming, Colorado, and New Mexico. The region comprises the southern portion of the Rocky Mountain Front geographic region of Canada and the United States, extending into the Southwestern United States. The Southern Rocky Mountain Front had a population of 5,467,633 according to the 2010 United States census. The region is one of the fastest-growing regions in the United States, and its population is projected to grow by 87% to 10,222,370 by 2050. In 2005 the GDP of the region was $229,202,000,000 making up 2% of the United States GDP.

== Extent ==
The Southern Rocky Mountain Front stretches from Albuquerque, New Mexico, north along Interstate Highway 25 to Cheyenne, Wyoming, and includes the Denver-Aurora-Lakewood, CO Metropolitan Statistical Area, the Colorado Springs, CO Metropolitan Statistical Area, the Boulder, CO Metropolitan Statistical Area, the Fort Collins, CO Metropolitan Statistical Area, the Greeley, CO Metropolitan Statistical Area, the Pueblo, CO Metropolitan Statistical Area, the Cheyenne, WY Metropolitan Statistical Area, the Cañon City, CO Micropolitan Statistical Area, the Albuquerque, NM Metropolitan Statistical Area, and the Santa Fe, NM Metropolitan Statistical Area. The region comprises three primary subregions: the South Central Colorado Urban Area, the North Central Colorado Urban Area, and the Cheyenne Metropolitan Area.

The influence of the region extends well beyond its defined boundaries. The Colorado Eastern Plains, Nebraska Panhandle and Albany County, Wyoming, among other areas, are culturally and economically tied to the region, though they are not considered a part of it.

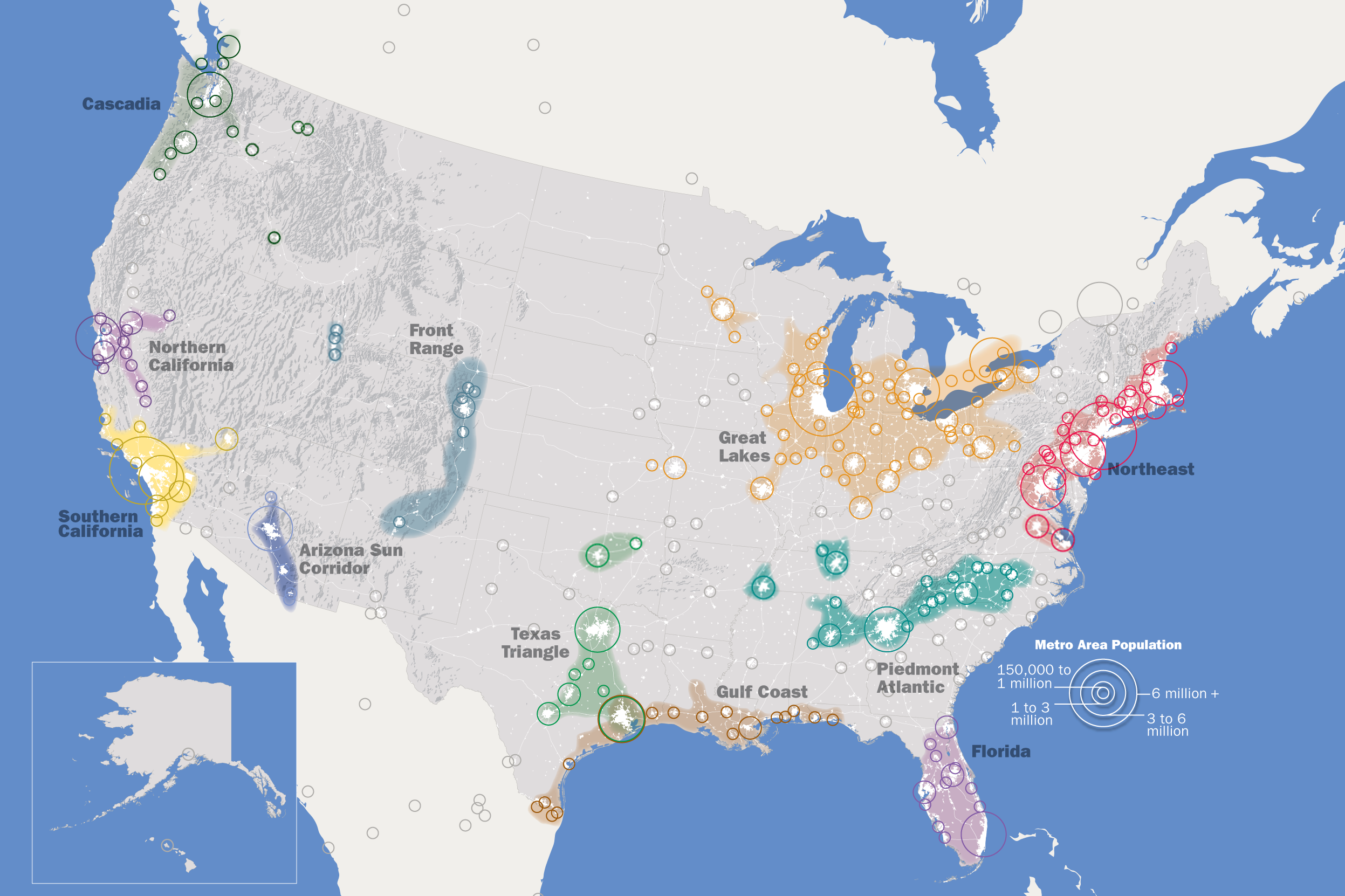
Map of the 11 emerging megaregions of the United States.

Southern Rocky Mountain Front
Region	Core-based statistical area	2012 estimate	County	2012 estimate	2010 census	Change
Southeast Wyoming	Cheyenne, WY Metropolitan Statistical Area	94,483	Laramie County	94,483	91,738	+2.99%
North Central Colorado	Fort Collins-Loveland, CO Metropolitan Statistical Area	310,487	Larimer County	310,487	299,630	+3.62%
North Central Colorado	Greeley, CO Metropolitan Statistical Area	263,691	Weld County	263,691	252,825	+4.30%
North Central Colorado	Boulder, CO Metropolitan Statistical Area	305,318	Boulder County	305,318	294,567	+3.65%
North Central Colorado	Denver-Aurora-Lakewood, CO Metropolitan Statistical Area	2,645,209	City and County of Denver	634,265	600,158	+5.68%
North Central Colorado	Denver-Aurora-Lakewood, CO Metropolitan Statistical Area	2,645,209	Arapahoe County	595,546	572,003	+4.12%
North Central Colorado	Denver-Aurora-Lakewood, CO Metropolitan Statistical Area	2,645,209	Jefferson County	545,358	534,543	+2.02%
North Central Colorado	Denver-Aurora-Lakewood, CO Metropolitan Statistical Area	2,645,209	Adams County	459,598	441,603	+4.07%
North Central Colorado	Denver-Aurora-Lakewood, CO Metropolitan Statistical Area	2,645,209	Douglas County	298,215	285,465	+4.47%
North Central Colorado	Denver-Aurora-Lakewood, CO Metropolitan Statistical Area	2,645,209	City and County of Broomfield	58,298	55,889	+4.31%
North Central Colorado	Denver-Aurora-Lakewood, CO Metropolitan Statistical Area	2,645,209	Elbert County	23,383	23,086	+1.29%
North Central Colorado	Denver-Aurora-Lakewood, CO Metropolitan Statistical Area	2,645,209	Park County	16,029	16,206	−1.09%
North Central Colorado	Denver-Aurora-Lakewood, CO Metropolitan Statistical Area	2,645,209	Clear Creek County	9,026	9,088	−0.68%
North Central Colorado	Denver-Aurora-Lakewood, CO Metropolitan Statistical Area	2,645,209	Gilpin County	5,491	5,441	+0.92%
South Central Colorado	Colorado Springs, CO Metropolitan Statistical Area	668,353	El Paso County	644,964	622,263	+3.65%
South Central Colorado	Colorado Springs, CO Metropolitan Statistical Area	668,353	Teller County	23,389	23,350	+0.17%
South Central Colorado	Cañon City, CO Micropolitan Statistical Area	46,788	Fremont County	46,788	46,824	−0.08%
South Central Colorado	Pueblo, CO Metropolitan Statistical Area	160,852	Pueblo County	160,852	159,063	+1.12%
Northern New Mexico	Albuquerque, NM Metropolitan Statistical Area	901,700	Bernalillo County	673,460	662,564	+1.64%
Northern New Mexico	Albuquerque, NM Metropolitan Statistical Area	901,700	Sandoval County	135,588	131,561	+3.06%
Northern New Mexico	Albuquerque, NM Metropolitan Statistical Area	901,700	Torrance County	16,021	16,383	−2.21%
Northern New Mexico	Albuquerque, NM Metropolitan Statistical Area	901,700	Valencia County	76,631	76,569	+0.08%
Northern New Mexico	Santa Fe, NM Metropolitan Statistical Area	146,375	Santa Fe County	146,375	144,170	+1.53%
Total				5,543,256	5,364,989	+3.32%

== Transportation ==
=== Rail ===
The region was established, along with ten other megaregions throughout the United States, by America 2050 in response to President Barack Obama’s efforts to improve the country’s infrastructure. The megaregions were initially identified by America 2050 as areas that should have highspeed rail by 2050. According to America 2050’s four phase plan the Front Range would have highspeed rail on Phase 3 of the plan and the line would stretch from Denver, Colorado to Albuquerque, New Mexico.

=== Interstates and highways ===
Interstate 25 runs through the Southern Rocky Mountain Front north from Albuquerque, NM to Cheyenne, WY. Major east and west routes running through the region are I-40 through Albuquerque, I-70 through Denver, and I-80 through Cheyenne.

- Interstate 25 runs north–south from New Mexico through Denver to Wyoming
- Interstate 70 runs east–west through the region from Utah to Maryland
- Interstate 80 runs east–west through the region from California to New Jersey
- Interstate 40 runs east–west through the region from California to North Carolina

=== Airports ===
The region has seven airports offering passenger services with two of the airports, Albuquerque International Sunport and Denver International Airport, able to handle international flights.

==== List of airports offering passenger services ====
Airport	Aircraft operations	Passengers
Albuquerque International Sunport	192,520	5,801,641
Cheyenne Regional Airport	65,163	
Colorado Springs Airport	153,244	
Denver International Airport	635,445	53,156,278
Pueblo Memorial Airport	182,119	
Laramie Regional Airport	10,486	
Santa Fe Municipal Airport	78,569	

== Municipalities ==
The 25 most populous municipalities of the Southern Rocky Mountain Front
Rank	Municipality	State	County	CBSA	2012 estimate	2010 census	Change
1	City and County of Denver	Colorado	City and County of Denver	Denver-Aurora-Lakewood, CO Metropolitan Statistical Area	634,265	600,158	+5.68%
2	City of Albuquerque	New Mexico	Bernalillo County	Albuquerque, NM Metropolitan Statistical Area	555,417	545,852	+1.75%
3	City of Colorado Springs	Colorado	El Paso County	Colorado Springs, CO Metropolitan Statistical Area	431,834	416,427	+3.70%
4	City of Aurora	Colorado	Arapahoe County; Adams County	Denver-Aurora-Lakewood, CO Metropolitan Statistical Area	339,030	325,078	+4.29%
5	City of Fort Collins	Colorado	Larimer County	Fort Collins, CO Metropolitan Statistical Area	148,612	143,986	+3.21%
6	City of Lakewood	Colorado	Jefferson County	Denver-Aurora-Lakewood, CO Metropolitan Statistical Area	145,516	142,980	+1.77%
7	City of Thornton	Colorado	Adams County; Weld County	Denver-Aurora-Lakewood, CO Metropolitan Statistical Area; Greeley, CO Metropolitan Statistical Area	124,140	118,772	+4.52%
8	City of Westminster	Colorado	Adams County; Jefferson County	Denver-Aurora-Lakewood, CO Metropolitan Statistical Area	109,169	106,114	+2.88%
9	City of Pueblo	Colorado	Pueblo County	Pueblo, CO Metropolitan Statistical Area	107,772	106,595	+1.10%
10	City of Arvada	Colorado	Jefferson County; Adams County	Denver-Aurora-Lakewood, CO Metropolitan Statistical Area	109,745	106,433	+3.11%
11	City of Centennial	Colorado	Arapahoe County	Denver-Aurora-Lakewood, CO Metropolitan Statistical Area	103,743	100,377	+3.35%
12	City of Boulder	Colorado	Boulder County	Boulder, CO Metropolitan Statistical Area	101,808	97,385	+4.54%
13	City of Greeley	Colorado	Weld County	Greeley, CO Metropolitan Statistical Area	95,357	92,889	+2.66%
14	City of Rio Rancho	New Mexico	Sandoval County; Bernalillo County	Albuquerque, NM Metropolitan Statistical Area	90,818	87,521	+3.77%
15	City of Longmont	Colorado	Boulder County; Weld County	Boulder, CO Metropolitan Statistical Area; Greeley, CO Metropolitan Statistical Area	88,669	86,270	+2.78%
16	City of Santa Fe	New Mexico	Santa Fe County	Santa Fe, NM Metropolitan Statistical Area	69,204	67,947	+1.85%
17	City of Loveland	Colorado	Larimer County	Fort Collins, CO Metropolitan Statistical Area	70,223	66,859	+5.03%
18	City of Cheyenne	Wyoming	Laramie County	Cheyenne, WY Metropolitan Statistical Area	61,537	59,466	+3.48%
19	City and County of Broomfield	Colorado	City and County of Broomfield	Denver-Aurora-Lakewood, CO Metropolitan Statistical Area	58,298	55,889	+4.31%
20	Town of Castle Rock	Colorado	Douglas County	Denver-Aurora-Lakewood, CO Metropolitan Statistical Area	51,348	48,231	+6.46%
21	City of Commerce City	Colorado	Adams County	Denver-Aurora-Lakewood, CO Metropolitan Statistical Area	48,421	45,913	+5.46%
22	Town of Parker	Colorado	Douglas County	Denver-Aurora-Lakewood, CO Metropolitan Statistical Area	47,169	45,297	+4.13%
23	City of Littleton	Colorado	Arapahoe County; Jefferson County; Douglas County	Denver-Aurora-Lakewood, CO Metropolitan Statistical Area	43,775	41,737	+4.88%
24	City of Northglenn	Colorado	Adams County; Weld County	Denver-Aurora-Lakewood, CO Metropolitan Statistical Area; Greeley, CO Metropolitan Statistical Area	36,891	35,789	+3.08%
25	City of Brighton	Colorado	Adams County; Weld County	Denver-Aurora-Lakewood, CO Metropolitan Statistical Area; Greeley, CO Metropolitan Statistical Area	34,636	33,352	+3.85%

== See also ==
- Southern Rocky Mountain Front
  - Front Range Urban Corridor
    - Southeast Wyoming
    - North Central Colorado Urban Area
    - South Central Colorado Urban Area
  - Northern New Mexico
- Colorado
  - Colorado statistical areas
- Conurbation
- List of census-designated places in Colorado
- List of census-designated places in New Mexico
- List of census-designated places in Wyoming
- List of cities and towns in Colorado
- List of cities and towns in New Mexico
- List of cities and towns in Wyoming
- List of counties in Colorado
- List of counties in New Mexico
- List of counties in Wyoming
- List of places in Colorado
- Megaregions of the United States
- New Mexico
  - New Mexico statistical areas
- Rocky Mountain Front
- Southern Rocky Mountains
- Statistical area (United States)
  - Combined statistical area (list)
  - Core-based statistical area (list)
    - Metropolitan statistical area (list)
    - Micropolitan statistical area (list)
- Wyoming
  - Wyoming statistical areas
