= List of portmanteaus =

This is a selection of portmanteau words.

== Animals ==
- globster, from glob and lobster
- Hvaldimir, from Norwegian hval (whale) and Russian President Vladimir Putin
- lorikeet, from lory and parakeet

=== Hybrids ===
- cattalo, from cattle and buffalo
- donkra, from donkey and zebra (progeny of donkey stallion and zebra mare) cf. zedonk below
- llamanaco, from llama and guanaco
- narluga, from narwhal and beluga whale
- wholphin, from whale and dolphin
- zorse, from zebra and horse (progeny of zebra stallion and horse mare) cf. hebra above

==== Cats ====
- leopon, from leopard and lion
- liger, from lion and tiger (progeny of male lion and tigress) cf. tiglon/tigon below
- tigon, from tiger and lion (progeny of male tiger and lioness) cf. liger above

=== Mixed breeds ===
==== Dogs ====
- cockapoo, from Cocker Spaniel and poodle (with influence from cockatoo)
- goldendoodle, from Golden Retriever and poodle ("doodle" in reference to the Labradoodle)
- Labradoodle, from Labrador Retriever and poodle

=== Fictional ===
- crocoduck, from crocodile and duck
- Pajanimals, from pajamas and animals
- jackalope, from jackrabbit and antelope

== Art, design, literature and entertainment ==
- animanga, from anime and manga (Note: Animanga term refers to Japanese anime and manga, originally a trademark of Viz Media became genericized trademark after expired on October 28, 2016.)
- Bananagrams, from bananas and anagrams
- camcorder, from camera and recorder
- Fakémon, from fake and Pokémon
- Gidget, from girl and midget
- Japandi, Japanese and Scandi design
- mockbuster, from mock and blockbuster
- mockumentary, from mock and documentary
- newscast, from news and broadcast
- nonebrity, from nonentity and celebrity
- reprography, from reproduce and photography
- Rockapella, from rock and a cappella
- screamo, from scream and emo
- sitcom, from situational comedy
- Spraycation, from vacation and spraypainting coined by the anonymous English Street artist Banksy for the title of his summer 2021 series of works "A Great British Spraycation"
- Swasticar, from swastika and car
- travelogue, from travel and monologue

=== Fashion and apparel ===
- crossplay, from crossdressing and cosplay
- jeggings, from jeans and leggings
- jorts, from jeans and shorts

== Cuisine ==
- brunch, from breakfast and lunch
- Buffaranch, from Buffalo sauce and ranch dressing
- cakefetti, from cake and confetti
- Chapagetti, from Chajangmyun and spaghetti
- Jjapaguri, from Chapagetti and Neoguri
- cheesymite, from cheese and vegemite
- Chipwich, from chocolate chip and ice cream sandwich
- Chocodile, from chocolate and crocodile
- cronut, from croissant and donut
- Floribbean, Floridian and Caribbean
- frappuccino, from frappé and cappuccino
- frogurt, from frozen and yogurt
- frosé, from frozen and rosé
- gizdodo, from gizzard and dodo (fried plantain)
- glutose, from glucose and fructose
- gooducken, from goose, duck, and chicken
- Hanch, from hot sauce and ranch dressing
- Honeyracha, from honey and sriracha
- jjapaguri, from jjajangmyeon and Neoguri
- Ketchili, from ketchup and sweet chili sauce
- Kranch, from ketchup and ranch dressing
- lemandarin, from lemon and Mandarin orange
- Pilk, from Pepsi and milk
- Lymon, from lime and lemon
- Mayocue, from mayonnaise and barbecue
- Mayomust, from mayonnaise and mustard
- Mayoracha, from mayonnaise and sriracha
- mochaccino, from mocha and cappuccino
- ram-don, from ramen and udon
- ricearoni, from rice and macaroni
- sushirrito, from sushi and burrito
- Tarchup, from tartar sauce and ketchup
- tofurkey, from tofu and turkey
- turducken, from turkey, duck, and chicken
- Vegemite, from vegetable and Marmite
- Wasabioli, from wasabi and aioli

=== Hybrids ===
- broccoflower, from broccoli and cauliflower
- Brusselkale, from Brussels sprouts and kale
- celtuce, from celery and lettuce
- citrange, from citron and orange
- citrangequat, from citrange and kumquat
- citrumelo, from citrus and pommelo
- garlion, from garlic and onion
- Grāpple, from grape and apple
- Kinnow, from 'King' (Citrus nobilis) and 'Willow Leaf' (Citrus × deliciosa)
- lemonquat, from lemon and kumquat
- limequat, from Key lime and kumquat
- mandelo, from mandarin orange and pommelo
- orangequat, from orange and kumquat
- parsnip, from Pastinaca and turnip (though often confused with parsley root leftover after the leaves and stems have been snipped)
- peacherine, from peach and nectarine
- peacotum, from peach, apricot and plum
- pineberry, from pineapple and strawberry
- pluot, from plum and apricot
- pomato, from potato and tomato
- procimequat, from primitive Hong Kong kumquat and limequat
- sunchoke, from sunflower and artichoke
- tangelo, from tangerine and pomelo
- tomacco, from tomato and tobacco, coined on The Simpsons, "E-i-e-i-(Annoyed Grunt)"
- triticale, from Triticum (wheat) and Secale (rye)
- yuzuquat, from yuzu and kumquat

== General ==
- reflexpletive, from reflex and expletive; the curse word you yell reflexively when you stub your toe on the furniture
- advergame, from advertising and game
- baffound, from baffle and confound
- balloonacy, from balloon and lunacy
- blizzaster, from blizzard and disaster
- boldacious, from bold and audacious
- brainiac, from brain and maniac
- bromance, from bro and romance
- cablegram, from cable and telegram
- carbage, from car and garbage
- Chinarello, from China and Pinarello (used to describe a counterfeit Pinarello racing bike)
- chuggers, from charity and muggers
- complisult, from compliment and insult
- cosplay, from costume and play
- disastrophe, from disaster and catastrophe
- drunkorexia, from drunk and anorexia
- dumbfound, from dumb and confound
- electrocute, from electric and execute
- Farmageddon, from farm and Armageddon, title of book
- flimmer, from flicker and glimmer
- flounder, from flounce and founder or founder and blunder
- fluff, from flue and puff
- foolosophy, from fool and philosophy
- glamping, from glamour and camping
- glasphalt, from glass and asphalt
- globesity, from global and obesity
- Japanglish, Japanese and English mixed up to humorous effect (cf. Chinglish, Spanglish, Franglais)
- mangina, from man and vagina
- jeepney, from jeep and jitney
- medevac, medical evacuation
- motel, from motor and hotel
- Movember, from moustache and November
- needcessity, from need and necessity
- phubbing, from phone and snubbing
- prissy, from prim and fussy (or sissy)
- scribacious, from scribe and loquacious
- ringxiety, from ring and anxiety
- sexcellent, from sex and excellent
- sexting, from sex and texting
- shamateur, from sham and amateur
- shiksappeal, from shiksa and appeal
- simulcasting, from simultaneous broadcasting
- slimsy, from slim and flimsy
- slithy, from slimy and lithe (coined by Lewis Carroll)
- smog, from smoke and fog
- smothercate, from smother and suffocate
- Snowmageddon, from snow and Armageddon
- solemncholy, from solemn and melancholy
- splatter, from splash and spatter
- squarson, from squire and parson
- squirl, from squiggle and twirl or whirl
- stash, from store or stow and cache
- staycation, from stay and vacation
- stroad, from street and road
- telethon, from television and marathon
- transbian, from transgender and lesbian
- twirl, from twist and whirl
- twunk, from twink and hunk
- womance, from woman and romance

== Internet and computing ==
- brogrammer, from bro and programmer
- codec, from coder and decoder
- emoticon, from emotion and icon
- listicle, from list and article
- machinima, from machine and cinema
- Microsoft, from microcomputer and software
- modem, from modulator and demodulator
- Pokémon, from pocket and monster
- spamouflage, from spam and camouflage
- textonym, from text and synonym
- transceiver, from transmitter and receiver
- vortal, from vertical and portal

== Organizations and companies ==
- Alstom, from Alsace and Thompson-Houston (Note: Originally spelled "Alsthom", the "h" was removed in 2008 (the company was named GEC-Alsthom at the time).)
- Amtrak, from American and track
- Bapes, from bathing and ape
- Calutron, from California University Cyclotron
- Citizendium, from Citizens' Compendium
- Conservapedia, from conservative and Wikipedia
- Crosville, from George Crosland Taylor and Georges de Ville
- Dash (cryptocurrency), from Digital and Cash
- Ecosia, from ecology and Acacia
- Edexcel, from educational and excellence
- Emergen-C, from emergency and vitamin C
- Extell, from excellence and intelligence
- Froogle, from frugal and Google
- Fruitopia, from fruit and utopia
- Fudgsicle, from fudge and popsicle
- Funimation, from fun and animation
- Garmin, from Gary Burrell and Min Kao
- Googleplex, from Google and complex (meaning a complex of buildings) (Note: Influence from googolplex.)
- Groupon, from group and coupon
- HokBen, from hoka-hoka and bento
- Ideanomics, from idea and economics
- Imagineering, from Imagine (or Imagination) and Engineering
- LATAM, from Lan Airlines and TAM Airlines
- Lenovo, from Legend and "novo" (Latin ablative for "new")
- Medi-Cal, California's name for their Medicaid program, from medical and California
- Medicaid, from medicine/medical and aid
- Medicare, from medicine/medical and care
- MSNBC, from MSN and NBC
- Netflix, from internet and flicks (slang for movie)
- Nikon, from Nippon Kōgaku and Ikon
- Pinterest, from pin and interest
- Poo-Pourri, from poo and potpourri
- Popsicle, from lollipop and icicle
- Qualcomm, from Quality and Communications
- RuPay, from rupee and payment
- Rustoleum, from rust and linoleum
- Spotify, from spot and identify
- Teletoon, from television and cartoon
- Toonami, from cartoon and tsunami
- Toshiba, from Shibaura Seisaku-sho and Tokyo Denki (Note: Through the merger of Shibaura Seisaku-sho and Tokyo Denki became Tokyo Shibaura Electric K.K.)
- Travelocity, from travel and velocity
- Triscuit, from electricity and biscuit
- Venezuelanalysis, from Venezuela and analysis
- Verizon, from veritas (Latin for truth) and horizon
- Victorinox, from Victoria (the company founder's mother) and inox (stainless steel)
- Unilever, from Margarine Unie and Lever Brothers
- Wikimedia, from Wikipedia and media
- Wikipedia, from wiki and encyclopedia
- Yelp, from yellow pages and help
- Yosicle, from yogurt and popsicle

== Places ==
- AfPak, from Afghanistan and Pakistan
- Afrabia, from Africa and Arabia
- Afro-Eurasia, from Africa, Europe, Asia
- Arlandria, from Arlington, VA and Alexandria, VA
- Australasia, from Australia and Asia
- Autopia, attraction in Disneyland, from automobile and utopia
- Benelux, from Belgium, the Netherlands, and Luxembourg
- Birome, from Bickham and Jerome Cartwright, landowners
- BosWash, from Boston and Washington, D.C.
- Brockton, from Brant, Greenock and Walkerton
- Calexico, from California and Mexico
- Calistoga, from California and Saratoga
- Canwood, from Canadian woodlands
- Chambana, from Champaign and Urbana
- Chiberia, from Chicago and Siberia
- Chindia, from China and India
- Chiraq, from Chicago and Iraq
- Chimerica, from China and America
- Chunnel, from Channel and Tunnel. from "The English Channel Tunnel"
- Clerval, from claire vallée, French for "clear valley"
- Cotai, from Coloane and Taipa
- Czechoslovakia, from Czechia and Slovakia
- Dalworthington Gardens, a city in north Texas, from Dallas, Fort Worth, Arlington
- Delmarva, from Delaware, Maryland, and Virginia
- Delran Township, from the Delaware River and Rancocas Creek
- Donbas, from Donets coal basin
- Eurabia, from Europe and Arabia
- Eurasia, from Europe and Asia
- Fairborn, from Fairfield and Osborn
- Gerbangkertosusila, from Gresik, Bangkalan, Mojokerto, Surabaya, Sidoarjo, Lamongan
- Glenbard, from Glen Ellyn and Lombard
- Harvey Cedars, from harvest and cedars
- Hillcrest, from Country Club Hills and Hazel Crest
- Hollansburg, from Hollaman and Harland, landowners
- Hotlanta, from hot and Atlanta
- Illiana, from Illinois and Indiana
- Indialantic, from Indian River Lagoon and the Atlantic Ocean
- Irrigon, from irrigation and Oregon
- Jabodetabek, from Jakarta, Bogor, Depok, Tangerang, Bekasi (Note: Sometimes Cianjur also included, became Jabodetabekjur or Jabodetabekpunjur.)
- Jardee, from Jardanup and Deeside
- Kanorado, from Kansas And Colorado
- Kanwaka Township and Kanwaka, from the Kansas and Wakarusa Rivers
- Kentuckiana, from Kentucky and Indiana
- Kormak, from Charles Korpela and Oscar Maki, settlers
- Manchattan, from Manchester and Manhattan
- Mexicali, from Mexico and California
- Michiana, from Michigan and Indiana
- Navelencia, from navel and Valencia oranges
- NyLon (the concept, not the plastic), from New York City and London
- Nylonkong, from New York City, London, and Hong Kong
- Ohaton, from the Osler, Hammond and Nanton company
- Pennsyltucky, from Pennsylvania and Kentucky
- Poictesme, from the two French towns Poitiers and Angoulême, used in a number of novels by James Branch Cabell
- Sauk Prairie, from Sauk City and Prairie du Sac
- Scarberia, from Scarborough and Siberia
- SeaTac and Sea-Tac Airport, from Seattle and Tacoma
- Senegambia, from Senegal and Gambia
- Stravenue, from street and avenue
- Tamiami, from Tampa and Miami
- Tanzania, from Tanganyika and Zanzibar
- Taxachusetts, from taxation and Massachusetts
- Tehrangeles, from Tehran and Los Angeles
- Texarkana, from Texas, Arkansas, Louisiana
- Texoma, from Texas and Oklahoma
- The Tridge, from Tri-Cities and bridge
- Valsetz, from the Valley and Siletz Railroad, now a ghost town
- Vansterdam, from Vancouver and Amsterdam
- WaKeeney, from Warren, Keeney, & Co.
- Willowick, from Willoughby and Wickliffe, OH
- Woolaroc, from woods, lakes and rocks

== Politics ==
- agitprop, from agitation and propaganda
- beurgeois, from beur and bourgeois
- Cocacolonization, from Coca-Cola and colonization
- copaganda, from cop and propaganda
- democrazy, from democracy and crazy
- Demoncrat, from demon and Democrat
- Eracism, from erase and racism
- feminazi, from feminist and Nazi
- Gerrymander, from Elbridge Gerry and salamander
- kayaktivism, from kayaks and activism
- kompromat, from compromising and material
- Merkozy, from Angela Merkel and Nicolas Sarkozy
- netroots, from internet and grassroots
- Obamacare, from Barack Obama and healthcare
- Obamney, from Barack Obama and Mitt Romney
- precariat, from precarious and proletariat
- Putler, from Vladimir Putin and Adolf Hitler
- Rashism, from Russia and fascism
- Republicant, from Republican and can't
- Ruthanasia, from Ruth Richardson and euthanasia
- squirearchy, from squire and hierarchy
- warphans from war and orphans
- wikiality, from Wikipedia and reality
- Zupta, from Jacob Zuma and Gupta

=== Economics ===
- Abenomics, from Shinzō Abe and economics
- Bidenomics, from Joe Biden and economics
- Clintonomics, from Bill Clinton and economics
- Freakonomics, from freak and economics
- Moneygeddon, from money and Armageddon (permanent scare of financial crises)
- precariat, from precarious and proletariat
- Reaganomics, from Ronald Reagan and economics
- Rogernomics, from Roger Douglas and economics
- Rubinomics, from Robert Rubin and economics
- shrinkflation, from shrink and inflation
- slopaganda, from AI slop and propaganda
- stagflation, from stagnation and inflation
- tipflation, from tipping and inflation
- tokenomics, from token and economics
- Trussonomics, from Liz Truss and economics
- Volfefe index, from volatility and covfefe
- Orbanomics, from Viktor Orbán and economics

=== Movements ===
- agrihood, from agriculture and neighborhood
- Berniecrat, from Bernie Sanders and Democrat
- Blexit, from black and exit
  - Blexit, from Belgium and exit
- Brexit, from Britain and exit (with regards to leaving the EU)
- Calexit, from California and exit
- Chrislam, from Christianity and Islam
- Czexit, from Czech Republic and exit
- Danexit, from Dane and exit
- Dixiecrat, from Dixie and Democrat
- Fixit, from Finland and exit (with regards to leaving the EU)
- Frexit, from France and exit
- Grexit, from Greece and exit
- Huxit, from Hungary and exit
- Lexit, from left and Brexit
  - Lexit, from Luxembourg and exit
- Nexit, from Netherlands and exit
- Polexit, from Poland and exit
- regrexit, from regret and Brexit
- Roexit, from Romania and exit
- Texit, from Texas and exit
- thinspiration, from thin and inspiration

== Sciences ==
- abzyme, from antibody and enzyme
- alkyd, from alkyl (alcohol) and id (acid or anhydride)
- ametrine, from amethyst and citrine
- ampacity, from ampere and capacity
- aquaponics, from aquaculture and hydroponics
- arcology, from architecture and ecology
- biomarker, from biological and marker
- bionics, from biology and electronics
- botox, from botulinum and toxin
- brinicle, from brine and icicle
- caplet, from capsule and tablet
- carborundum, from carbon and corundum
- causet, from causal and set
- cermet, from ceramic and metal
- chemokine, from chemotactic and cytokine
- clopen set, from closed-open set
- contrail, from condensation and trail
- cryptochrome, from cryptogam and chromatic
- cultivar, from cultivated and variety
- cyborg, from cybernetic and organism
- diabesity, from diabetes and obesity
- digipeater, from digital and repeater
- electret, from electricity and magnet
- endorphin, from endogenous and morphine
- fogponics, from fog and aeroponics
- genome, from gene and chromosome
- geofact, from geological and artifact
- gleeking, from sublingual gland and leaking
- glocalization, from globalization and local
- glymphatic system, from glial and lymphatic
- grism, from grating and prism
- guesstimate, from guess and estimate
- Henipavirus, from Hendra virus and Nipah virus
- helikite, from helium and kite
- hermaphrodite, from Hermes and Aphrodite
- ibogalog, from ibogaine and analog
- kytoon, from kite and balloon
- lavacicle, from lava and icicle
- lidar, from light and radar
- mafic, from magnesium and ferric
- melatonin, from melanin and serotonin
- memristor, from memory and transistor
- mesohigh, from mesoscale and high-pressure area
- mesolow, from mesoscale and low-pressure area
- mesonet, from mesoscale and network
- nutraceutical, from nutrition and pharmaceutical
- optoelectronics, from optics and electronics
- parsec, from parallax and arcsecond
- pellistor, from pellet and resistor
- permaculture, from permanent and agriculture or culture
- petrochemical, from petroleum and chemical
- posistor, from positive and thermistor
- positron, from positive and electron
- prion, from protein and infection
- proteome, from proteins and genome
- pulsar, from pulsating and quasar
- purine, from pure and urine
- quoats, from quality and oats
- radome, from radar and dome
- redox, from reduction and oxidation
- resorcin, from resin and orcin
- rockoon, from rocket and balloon
- rusticle, from rust and icicle
- Snuppy, from SNU and puppy
- spintronic, from spin and electronics
- stiction, from static and friction
- surfactant, from surface active agent
- synzyme, from synthetic and enzyme
- telematics, from telecommunications and informatics
- thermistor, from thermal and resistor
- tripledemic, from triple and pandemic
- trivection, from triple and convection
- twindemic, from twin and pandemic
- urinalysis, from urine and analysis
- vitamer, from vitamin and isomer
- vitamin, from vita and amine
- warfarin, from WARF (Wisconsin Alumni Research Foundation) and coumarin
- wavicle, from wave and particle

== Sports and fitness ==
- athleisure, from athletic and leisure
- Bartitsu, from Edward William Barton-Wright and jiu-jitsu
- Deaflympics, from deaf and Olympics
- exercycle, from exercise and bicycle
- frolf, from frisbee and golf
- gun fu, from gun and kung fu
- Gymkata, from gymnastics and karate
- Gymkhana, from gymnasium and Jama'at Khana
- heelies, from heel and wheelie
- heliskiing, from helicopter and skiing
- Jazzercise, from jazz and exercise
- Mobot, from Mo (Farah) and robot
- Motocross, from motorcycle and cross country
- Monzanapolis, from Monza and Indianapolis
- Mumbay FC, from Mumbai and Bombay
- Paralympics, from parallel (originally paraplegic) and Olympics
- parasailing, from parachute and sailing
- plogging, from “plocka” (Swedish “pick up”) and jogging
- Prancercise, from prance and exercise
- scorigami, from score and origami
- SerAndy, from Serena Williams and Sir Andy Murray
- slurve, from slider and curve (baseball pitches)
- snuba, from snorkel and scuba
- suffrajitsu, from suffragette and jiu-jitsu
- TaeBo, from Taekwondo and boxing
- Trinbago Knight Riders, from Trinidad and Tobago
- twi-night, from twilight and night
- wallyball, from wall and volleyball

== See also ==
- List of acronyms
- List of lishes
- Syllabic abbreviation
