= Obesity-associated morbidity =

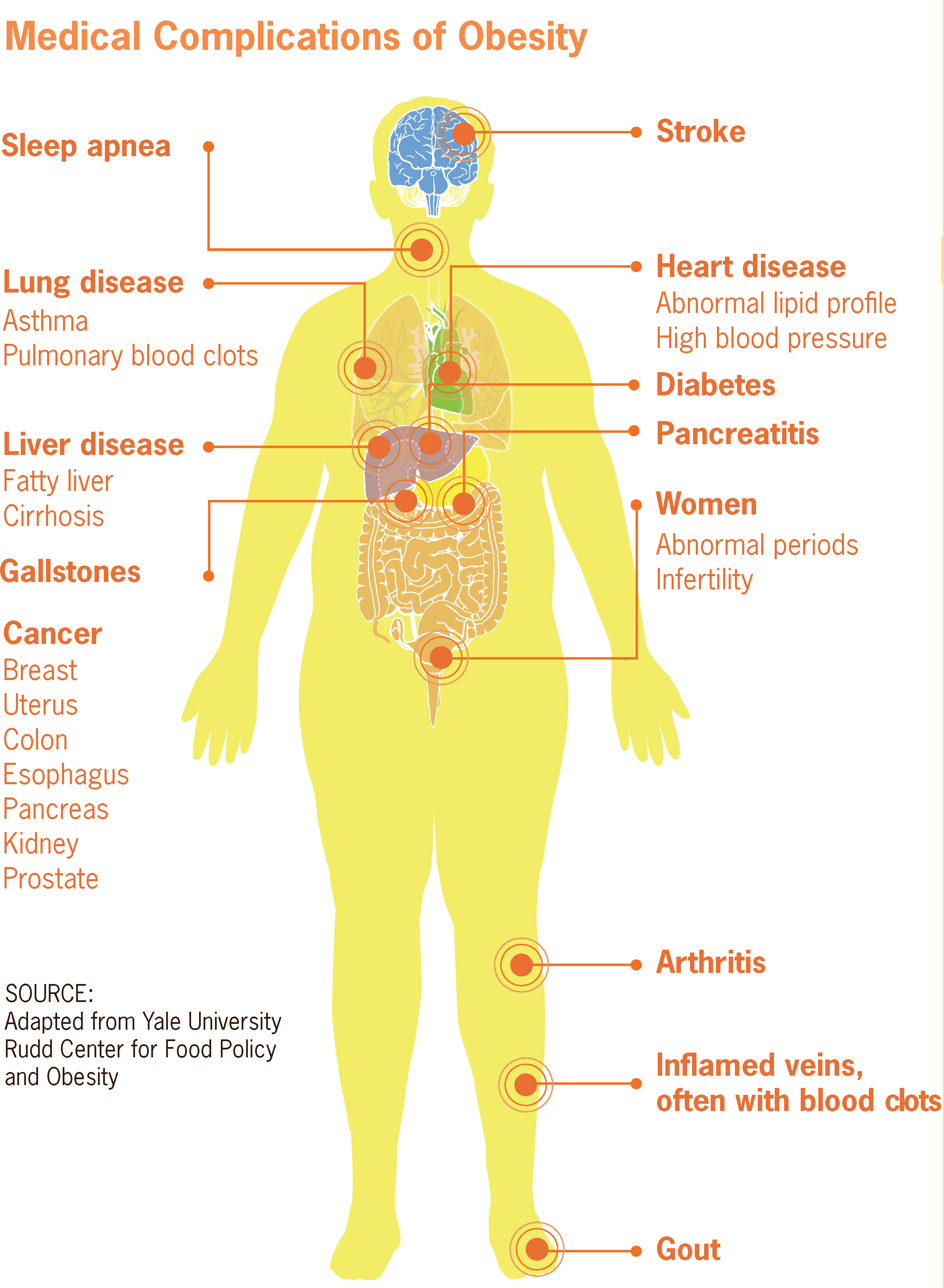
- Obesity may cause a number of medical complications which negatively impact peoples' quality of life.
- Specialty: Endocrinology (other specialties)

Death rate from obesity, 2019

Obesity is a risk factor for many chronic physical and mental illnesses.

Health risks for those who are overweight may be decreasing because of improvements in medical care. Some obesity-associated medical conditions may be the result of stress caused by medical discrimination against people who are obese, rather than the direct effects of obesity, and some may be exacerbated by the relatively poor healthcare received by people who are obese.

== Medical discrimination ==
Because of the social stigma of obesity, people who are obese may receive poorer healthcare than people within the normal BMI weight range, potentially contributing to the relationship between obesity and poor health outcomes. People who experience weight-related discrimination, irrespective of their actual weight status, similarly have poorer health outcomes than those who do not experience weight-related discrimination. People who are obese are also less likely to seek medical care than people who are not obese, even if the weight gain is caused by medical problems. Peter Muennig, a professor in the Department of Health Policy and Management at Columbia University, has proposed that obesity-associated medical conditions may be caused "not from adiposity alone, but also from the psychological stress induced by the social stigma associated with being obese".

== Cardiological risks ==
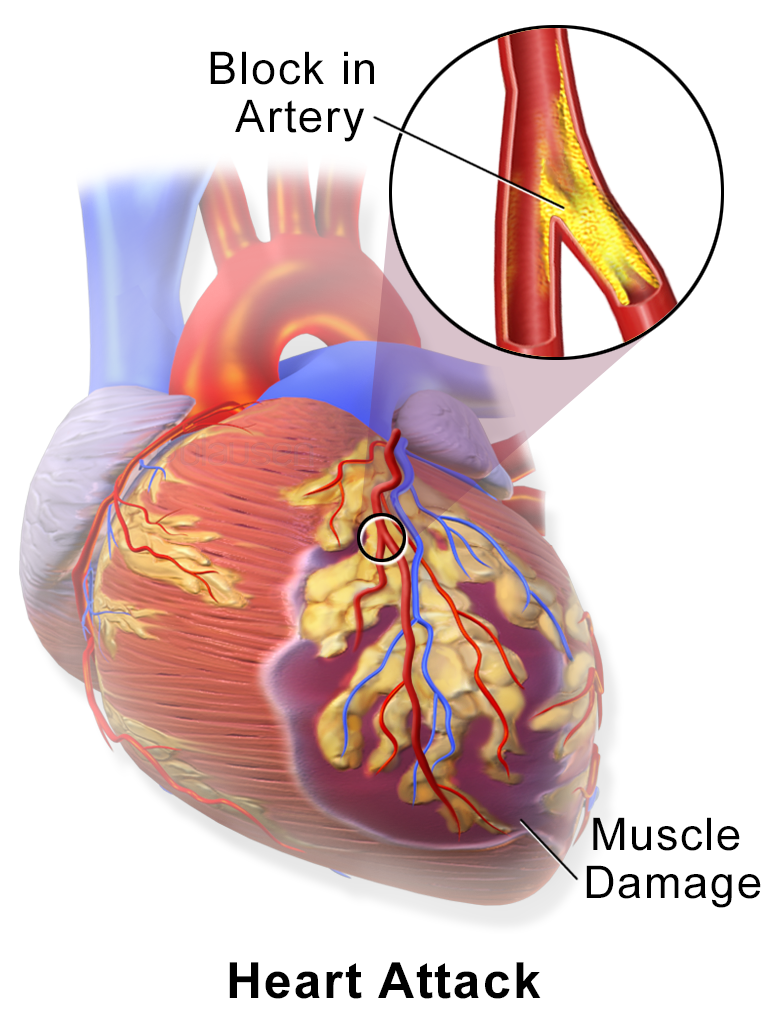
Heart attack (myocardial infarction)

Body weight is not considered to be an independently predictive risk factor for cardiovascular disease by current (as of 2014) risk assessment tools. Mortality from cardiovascular disease has decreased despite increases in obesity, and at least one clinical trial was stopped early because the weight loss intervention being tested did not reduce cardiovascular disease.

=== Ischemic heart disease ===
Abdominal obesity is associated with cardiovascular diseases including angina and myocardial infarction. However, overall obesity (as measured by BMI) may lead to false diagnoses of myocardial infarction and may decrease mortality after acute myocardial infarction.

In 2008, European guidelines concluded that 35% of ischemic heart disease among adults in Europe is due to obesity.

=== Congestive heart failure ===
Having obesity is associated to about 11% of heart failure cases in males and 14% in females.

=== High blood pressure ===
More than 85% of those with hypertension have a BMI greater than 25, although diet is probably a more important factor than body weight. Risk estimates indicate that at least two-thirds of people with hypertension can be directly attributed to obesity. The association between obesity and hypertension has been found in animal and clinical studies, which have suggested that there are multiple potential mechanisms for obesity-induced hypertension. These mechanisms include the activation of the sympathetic nervous system as well as the activation of the renin–angiotensin–aldosterone system. As of 2007, it was unclear whether there is an association between hypertension and obesity in children, but there is little direct evidence that blood pressure has increased despite increases in pediatric overweight.

=== Abnormal cholesterol levels ===
Obesity is associated with increased levels of LDL cholesterol and lower levels of HDL cholesterol in the blood.

=== Deep vein thrombosis and pulmonary embolism ===
Obesity increases one's risk of venous thromboembolism by approximately 2.3 fold.

== Dermatological risks ==
Obesity is associated with the incidence of stretch marks, acanthosis nigricans, lymphedema, cellulitis, hirsutism, and intertrigo.

== Endocrine risks ==
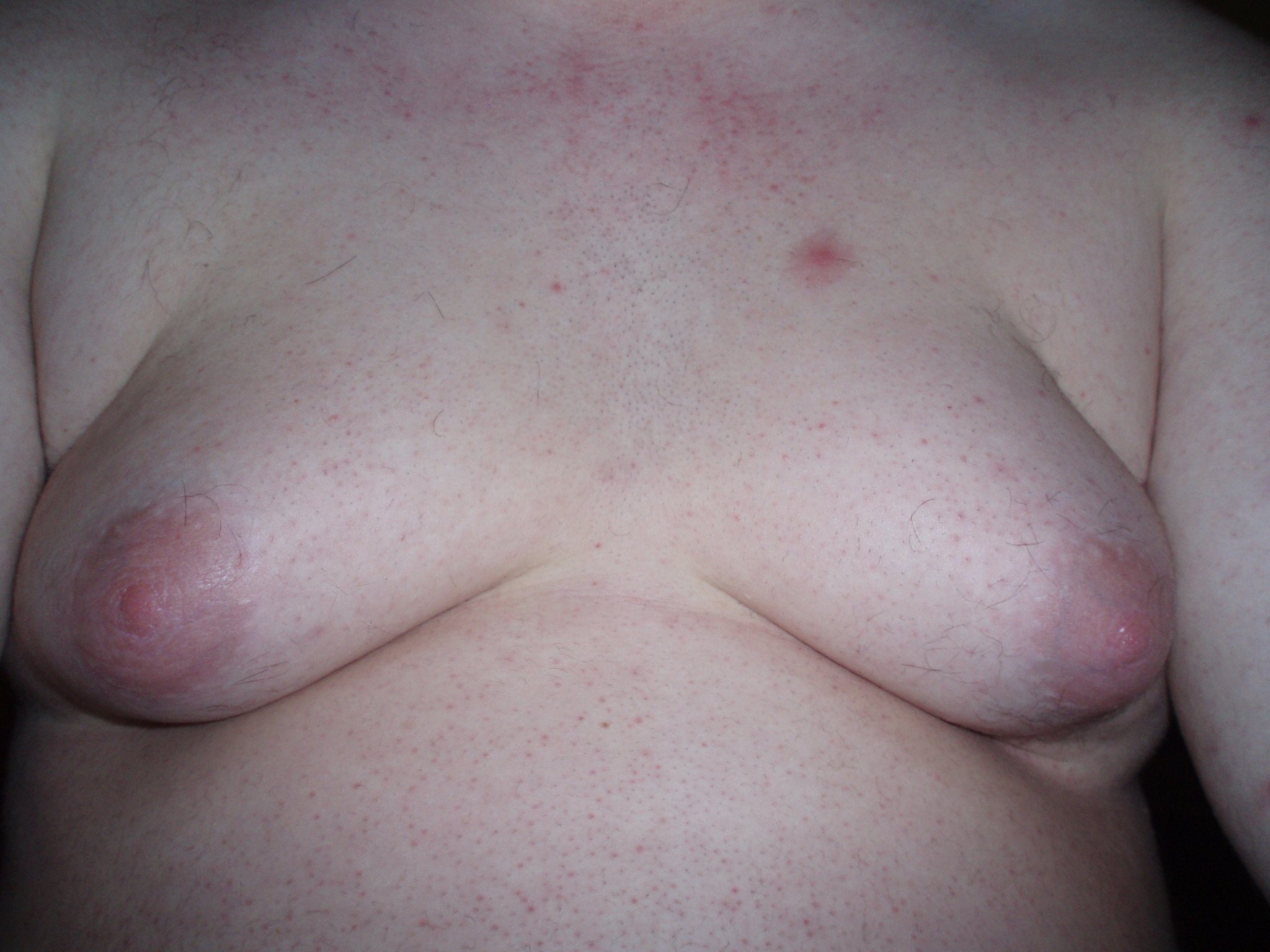
Gynecomastia in an obese male

=== Diabetes mellitus ===
The link between obesity and type 2 diabetes is so strong that researchers in the 1970s started calling it "diabesity". Excess weight is behind 64% of cases of diabetes in males and 77% of cases in females.

=== Gynecomastia ===
In some individuals, obesity can be associated with elevated peripheral conversion of androgens into estrogens.

== Gastrointestinal risks ==
=== Gastroesophageal reflux disease ===
Several studies have shown that the frequency and severity of GERD symptoms increase with BMI, such that people who are underweight have the fewest GERD symptoms, and people who are severely obese have the most GERD symptoms. However, most studies find that GERD symptoms are not improved by nonsurgical weight loss.

=== Cholelithiasis (gallstones) ===
Obesity causes the amount of cholesterol in bile to rise, in turn the formation of stone can occur

== Reproductive system (or genital system) ==
=== Polyendocrine metabolic ovarian syndrome (PMOS) ===
Due to its association with insulin resistance, the risk of obesity increases with polyendocrine metabolic ovarian syndrome (PMOS). In the US approximately 60% of patients with PMOS have a BMI greater than 30. It remains uncertain whether PMOS contributes to obesity, or the reverse.

=== Infertility ===
Obesity can lead to infertility in both males and females. This is primarily due to excess estrogen interfering with normal ovulation in females and altering spermatogenesis in males. It is believed to cause 6% of primary infertility. A review in 2013 came to the result that obesity increases the risk of oligospermia and azoospermia in males, with an of odds ratio 1.3. Being morbidly obese increases the odds ratio to 2.0.

=== Complications of pregnancy ===
Obesity is related to many complications in pregnancy including: haemorrhage, infection, increased hospital stays for the mother, and increased NICU requirements for the infant. Obese females also have increased risk of preterm births and low birth weight infants.

Obese females have more than twice the rate of C-sections compared to females of "normal" weight. Some have suggested that this may be due in part to the social stigma of obesity.

=== Birth defects ===
Those who are obese during pregnancy have a greater risk of having a child with a number of congenital malformations including: neural tube defects such as anencephaly and spina bifida, cardiovascular anomalies, including septal anomalies, cleft lip and palate, anorectal malformation, limb reduction anomalies, and hydrocephaly.

=== Intrauterine fetal death ===
Maternal obesity is associated with an increased risk of intrauterine fetal death.

=== Buried penis ===
Excess body fat in morbid obesity can, in some cases, completely obscure or "bury" the penis.

== Neurological risks ==
MCA territory infarct (stroke)

=== Stroke ===
Ischemic stroke is increased in both men and women who are obese, however the increase in risk is due to other metabolic health issues such as hypertension, increased blood pressure, decreased high-density lipoprotein, triglycerides or glucose, or diabetes.

=== Meralgia paresthetica ===
Meralgia paresthetica is a neuropathic pain or numbness of the thighs, sometimes associated with obesity.

=== Migraines ===
Migraine (and headaches in general) is comorbid with obesity. The risk of migraine rises 50% by BMI of 30 kg/m^{2} and 100% by BMI of 35 kg/m^{2}. The causal connection remains unclear.

=== Carpal tunnel syndrome ===
The risk of carpal tunnel syndrome is estimated to rise 7.4% for each 1 kg/m^{2} increase of body mass index.

=== Dementia ===
One review found that those who are obese do not have a significantly higher rate of dementia than those with "normal" weight.

=== Idiopathic intracranial hypertension ===
Idiopathic intracranial hypertension, or unexplained high pressure in the cranium, is a rare condition that can cause visual impairment, frequent severe headache, and tinnitus. It is most commonly seen in obese women, and the incidence of idiopathic intracranial hypertension is increasing along with increases in the number of people who are obese.

=== Multiple sclerosis ===
Obese female individuals at 18 years of age have a greater than twofold increased risk of multiple sclerosis compared to females with a BMI between 18.5 and 20.9. Female individuals who are underweight at age 18 have the lowest risk of multiple sclerosis. However, body weight as an adult was not associated with risk of multiple sclerosis.

== Cancer ==
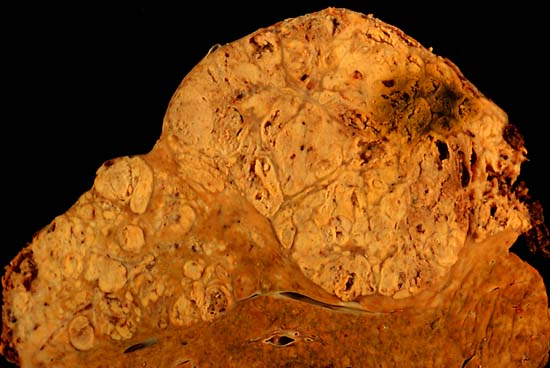
Hepatocellular carcinoma 1

Many cancers occur at increased frequency in those who are overweight or obese. A study from the United Kingdom found that approximately 5% of cancer is due to excess weight. These cancers include:

- breast cancer
- ovarian cancer
- esophageal cancer
- colorectal cancer
- hepatocellular carcinoma
- pancreatic cancer
- gallbladder cancer
- stomach cancer
- endometrial cancer
- cervical cancer
- prostate cancer
- renal cell carcinoma
- non-Hodgkin's lymphoma
- multiple myeloma

A high body mass index (BMI) is associated with a higher risk of developing ten common cancers including 41% of uterine cancers and at least 10% of gallbladder, kidney, liver and colon cancers in the UK. For those undergoing surgery for cancer, obesity is also associated with an increased risk of major postoperative complications compared with those of "normal" weight.

== Psychiatric risks ==
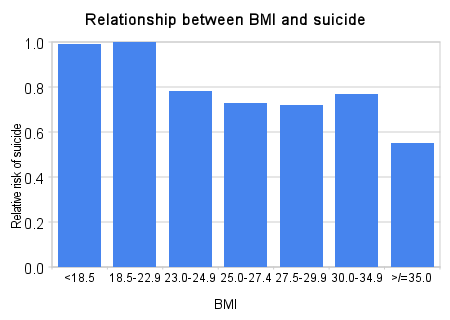
Risk of death from suicide decreases with increased body mass index in the United States.

=== Depression ===
Obesity has been associated with depression, likely due to social factors rather than physical effects of obesity. However, it is possible that obesity is caused by depression (due to reduced physical activity or, in some people, increases in appetite). Obesity-related disabilities may also lead to depression in some people. Repeated failed attempts at weight loss might also lead to depression.

The association between obesity and depression is strongest in those who are more severely obese, those who are younger, and in women. Suicide rate however decreases with increased BMI. Similarly, weight loss through bariatric surgery is associated with increased risk of suicide.

=== Social stigmatization ===
Obese people draw negative reactions from others, and people are less willing to help obese individuals in any situation due to social stigmatization. People who are obese also experience fewer educational and career opportunities, on average earn a lesser income, and generally receive poorer health care and treatment than individuals of "normal" weight.

== Respiratory system ==
=== Obstructive sleep apnea ===
Obesity is a risk factor for obstructive sleep apnea.

=== Obesity hypoventilation syndrome ===
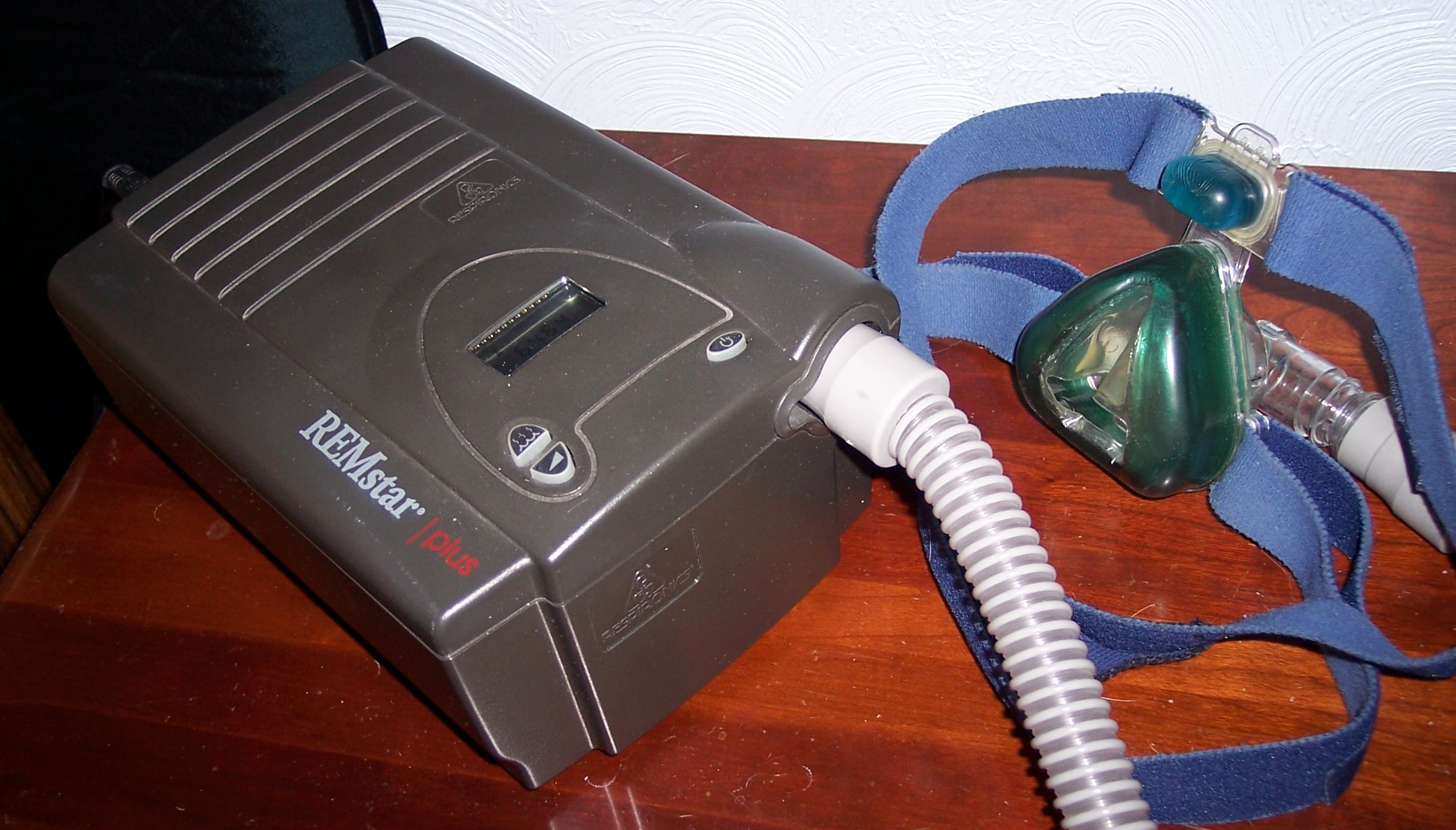
CPAP machine commonly used in OHS

Obesity hypoventilation syndrome is defined as the combination of obesity, hypoxia during sleep, and hypercapnia during the day, resulting from hypoventilation.

=== Chronic lung disease ===
Obesity is associated with a number of chronic lung diseases, including asthma and COPD. It is believed that a systemic pro-inflammatory state induced by some causes of obesity may contribute to airway inflammation, leading to asthma.

=== Complications during general anaesthesia ===
Obesity significantly reduces and stiffens the functional lung volume, requiring specific strategies for respiratory management under general anesthesia.

=== Obesity and asthma ===
The low grade systemic inflammation of obesity has been shown to worsen lung function in asthma and increase the risk of developing an asthma exacerbation.

=== COVID-19 ===
A study in England found a linear increase in severe COVID-19 resulting in hospitalisation and death for those whose BMI is above 23, and a linear increase in admission to an intensive care unit across the whole BMI spectrum. The difference in COVID-19 risk from having a high BMI was most pronounced in people aged under 40, or who were black. A study from Mexico found that obesity alone was responsible for a 2.7 times increased risk of death from COVID-19, while comorbidities with diabetes, immunosuppression or high blood pressure increased the risk further. A study from the United States found that there was an inverse correlation between age and BMI of COVID patients; the younger the age group, the higher its BMI.

== Rheumatological and orthopedic risks ==
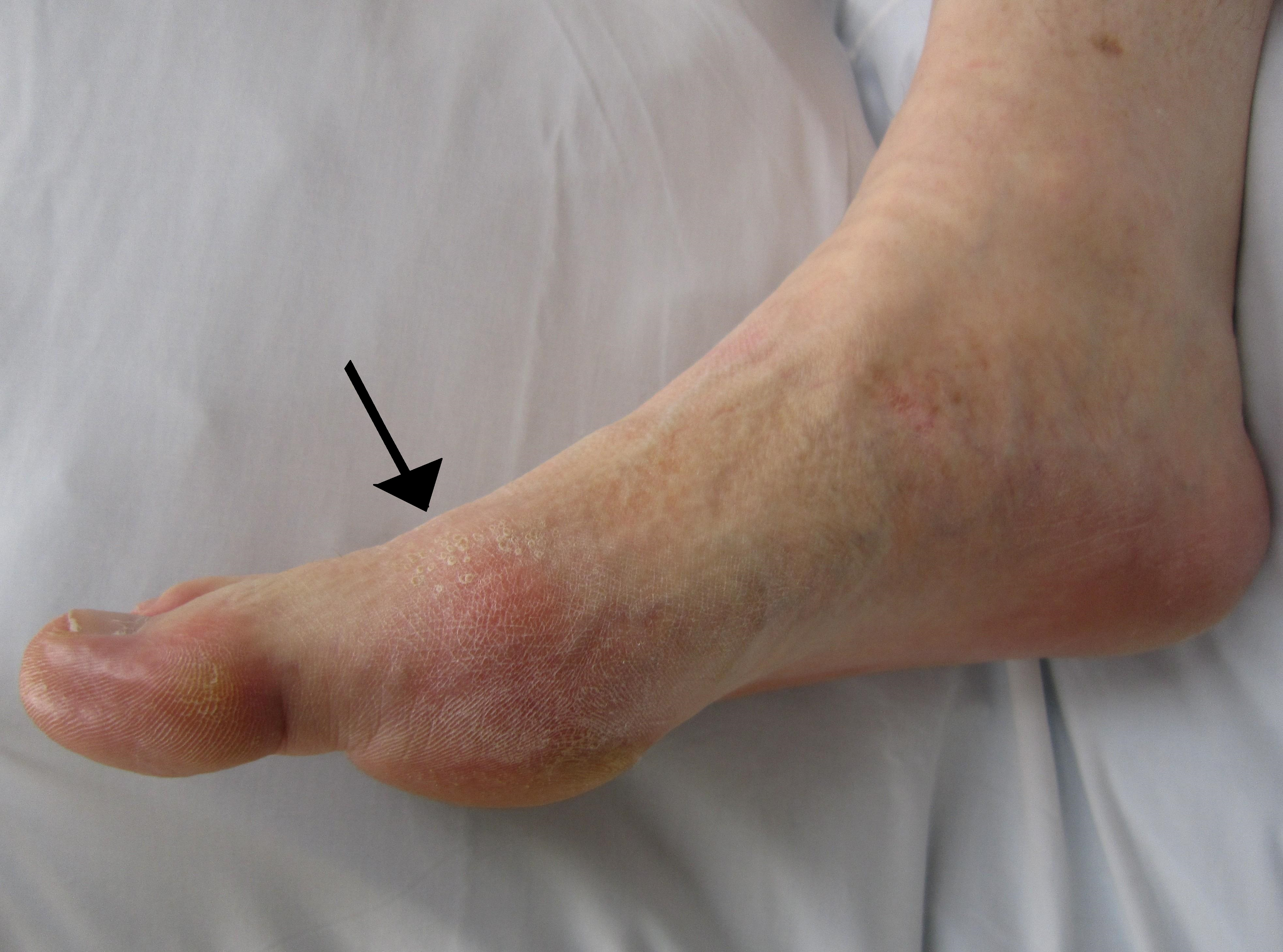
Gout

=== Gout ===
Compared to men with a BMI of 21–22.9, men with a BMI of 30–34.9 have 2.33 times more gout, and men with a BMI ≥ 35 have 2.97 times more gout. Weight loss decreases these risks.

=== Poor mobility ===
There is a strong association between obesity and musculoskeletal pain and disability.

=== Osteoarthritis ===
Increased rates of arthritis are seen in both weight-bearing and non-weight-bearing joints. Weight loss and exercise act to reduce the risk of osteoarthritis.

=== Low back pain ===
Obese individuals are twice to four times more likely to have lower back pain than their "normal" weight peers.

== Traumatic injury ==
In females, low BMI is a risk factor for osteoporotic fractures in general. In contrast, obesity is a protective factor for most osteoporotic fractures.

== Urological and nephrological risks ==
Urinary system

=== Urinary incontinence ===
Urge, stress, and mixed incontinence all occur at higher rates in obese people. The rates of urinary incontinence are about double that found in the "normal" weight population. Urinary incontinence improves with weight loss.

=== Chronic kidney disease ===
Obesity increases one's risk of chronic kidney disease by three to four times.

=== Hypogonadism ===
In males, obesity and metabolic syndrome both increase estrogen and adipokine production. This reduces gonadotropin-releasing hormone, in turn reducing both luteinizing hormone and follicle stimulating hormone. The result is reduction of the testis' production of testosterone and a further increase in adipokine levels. This then feeds back to cause further weight gain.

=== Erectile dysfunction ===
Obese male individuals can experience erectile dysfunction, and weight loss can improve their sexual functioning.

== See also ==
- Obesity hypoventilation syndrome
- Obesity paradox
