= Nassera Chohra =

French-Algerian writer

Nassera Chohra (born 1963 in Marseilles) is a French-Algerian writer. She is most well known for writing the autobiographical memoir Volevo Diventare Bianca (I Wanted to Become White) (Ed. Alessandra Atti di Sarro. Rome: E/O, 1993) after moving to Rome and learning Italian as an adult. The novel traces various episodes of her childhood in Marseilles as a beur — a second-generation Algerian in France— including experiences of racism and physical and sexual abuse. The final part of the narrative includes Chohra’s eventual move to Italy.

Like many migrant writers, Chohra wrote the book with assistance from a native speaker, in this case the journalist Alessandra Atti di Sarro; however, the collaboration was plagued by frequent disagreements Chohra Atti di Sarro’s. Chohra has also denied the possible influence of the writings of other women of Northern African descent, noting that she only read other works of migrant literature after writing her own autobiography. She has explained that she wrote the work during a pregnancy during which she began to think about her identity and the fact of not being white in a predominantly white culture.

Chohra is the daughter of Saharawi-Algerian immigrants who migrated to Marseilles. As a young woman she worked as a television actress in Paris before moving to Rome in 1990, at age 27. She initially traveled to Italy as a tourist and later decided to move there after meeting an Italian man whom she would marry. In her 2005 volume Migration Italy: The Art of Talking Back in a Destination Culture, Graziella Parati notes that Chohra is no longer able to be contacted "for reasons concerning her personal safety".

== Works ==
- Chohra, Nassera. Volevo Diventare Bianca. Ed. Alessandra Atti di Sarro. Roma: E/O, 1993.
