= Beurgeois =

Social class of French Muslims

A beurgeois is a middle-class (and upwards) Muslim born in a working-class area of France to parents of Maghrebi origin, who continues to proclaim their roots and who is aged between 30 and 40 years old with a successful professional career, a high purchasing power and a demand for a certain quality of life.

== Etymology ==
Beurgeois is a portmanteau neologism created in France from the words "beur" (meaning a person of Arab, Berber or other Maghrebi descent in verlan) and "bourgeois" (meaning affluent).

Among the beurgeois themselves, opinion over the beurgeois designation is quite divided. While some people consider it as a sort of recognition of their success, the majority believe that this pejorative term is once again expressing their stigmatization and discrimination as French people of Muslim descent.

== Beurgeois in French society ==
=== Concerning cuisine ===
The "beurgeois" among France's estimated 6-7 million-strong Muslim community are an emerging economic demographic, being catered to by a market in halal food and drinks. This has resulted in an increase in sales of halal products from the fast food chain to major retail chains to some top restaurants—all opening in many French cities to accommodate these customers. These offer a wide range of halal products including alcohol-free champagne and foie gras approved by Islamic law (an unexpected success first introduced into supermarket chains across the country in 2008 at the end of the Muslim fast of Ramadan). Thus the beurgeois have become a chosen marketing target that require to be treated as consumers having specific needs- which has been adapted to by a specific and growing market sector.

Yanis Bouarbi, an IT specialist who started the website paris-hallal.com (a website which lists more than 400 halal restaurants in Paris and its suburbs and is planning to expand to other French cities), who says young Muslims are at the heart of a mini social revolution; "When our parents and grandparents came to France they did mostly manual work and the priority was having enough to feed the family. But second or third-generation people like me have studied, have good jobs and money and want to go out and profit from French culture without compromising our religious beliefs. We don't just want cheap kebabs, we want Japanese, Thai, French food; we want to be like the rest of you." A similar sentiment is echoed in Paris's 11th arrondissement Les Enfants Terribles restaurant, run by brothers Kamel and Sosiane Saidi, which serves halal French haute cuisine; "Before, Muslims wishing to eat halal would go to a restaurant and it was fish or nothing. Now we have a choice," said Sosiane, 28, who worked in the property market before setting up the restaurant three years ago. "Young Muslims have money and want to eat out like everyone else but according to their religion. The food doesn't taste any different; we have many French customers who don't even know we're totally halal. To us, that is what integration is about."

The demand for halal products, which is increasing by an estimated 10% per year, has captured the attention of food distributors, growers, companies, and the like. Sales of halal products totaled €4 billion in 2009 and Solis (a consultancy that specializes in marketing to ethnic minorities) forecasts the market will expand about 10% in 2010, compared with a 2% growth in overall food sales. Antoine Bonnel, director of the 2010 Paris Halal trade show said, "It's mostly driven by the second and third generations. It's not a case of the Muslim community withdrawing into itself, but rather one of integration, since they want to be able to buy halal sauerkraut or spring rolls". French sales of halal food are forecast to hit 5.5 billion euros for 2010 and according to Bonnel, move "from the ethnic market to the mass market" due to the beurgeois, who are forcing international food suppliers to cater for their demands and as one French website put it, halal is "very good business" for French companies.

Examples of supermarket chains and packaged-food companies adapting products to cater to this demographic include: Nestlé's French operations, supermarket chain Groupe Casino, Pierre Martinet (France's biggest prepared salad maker), fast-food chain Quick (which has a number of halal-only burger bars), Hal'shop, and Carrefour.

=== Concerning politics ===
The beurgeois are not only a useful demographic to retailers but also to French politicians—and somewhat unlike their previous generations, the group does not intend have higher levels of apathy when it comes to the relationship of the sector to the country's government. It has been noted that the demographic has a greater interest in domestic politics, in order to make their voices heard as French citizens contributing to the culture and political climate of their country.

== Beurgeois people ==
Among the hundreds of prominent beurgeois that are senior civil servants, entrepreneurs, artists, doctors etc., some include:

- Mourad Boudjellal - owner of Soleil Productions, publishers of some of France's favourite cartoonists, has been presented in a documentary on television as the beurgeois prototype.
- Jamel Debbouze - one of the best-paid actors in French show business.
- Tahar Rahim - the first Frenchman of Maghrebi descent awarded the César for best male actor, among other awards.

== See also ==
- Islam in France
- Demographics of France
- List of portmanteaus
