= Beur =

French colloquial term describing people whose parents immigrated from the Maghreb

Beur (pronounced [bœʁ]), or alternatively rebeu, is a colloquial term, sometimes considered pejorative, in French to designate European-born people whose parents or grandparents are immigrants from the Maghreb. The equivalent term for a female beur is a beurette. However, the term beurette is condemned and criticized by several anti-racist organizations because of the xenophobic and degrading connotation that this word has taken on over the decades (in particular because of the fetishization of North African women in France as well as an insult stemming from colonialism). The term rebeu is neither applicable to females nor does it have a female version.

== Use ==
The word beur was coined using verlan for the word arabe, which means Arabic or Arab in French. Since the late 1990s, many young people have used the twice-verlanised term rebeu as a synonym. This term is now the dominant term used by the younger generations (under 30). The word beurette, the female version of beur, is created by adding the -ette female suffix in French. In French many slang words are created by simply reversing the syllables in a word and then reading the result (e.g. "femme" becomes "meuf" in verlan). The word beurgeois is derived from a combination of the words beur and bourgeois.

The term is mostly used in French-speaking European countries ― France, Belgium, Monaco, Luxembourg and Switzerland ― as well as in the Maghreb. Due to cultural integration between such peoples across Europe, the term is now popular in other parts of Europe with a large Maghrebi community, such as the UK, Spain, the Netherlands and Italy.

Since 1992, the BEUR.FM radio station has broadcast nationwide (106.7 FM in Paris).

== See also ==
- Maghrebis
- Maghrebi communities of Paris
- Berbers in France
- Arabs in France
- Arabs in Europe
- Maghrebi Jews
- Pied-Noir
- Demographics of France
- Arab diaspora
- Neuilly sa mère !
