= Calexit =

Calexit may refer to:

- Partition and secession in California
  - Yes California, a now-defunct political action committee
- Calexit (comic), an ongoing speculative-fiction comic book series
