= Jitney =

Jitney may refer to:

== Transportation ==
- Ford Model T, an influential car also colloquially known as a "jitney" when used as a cab or taxi
- Share taxi or dollar van, a category of transportation falling between a taxicab and a bus
- Jitney cab, an informal, unlicensed or illegal taxi operation
- Jitney (railcar), or doodlebug, a self-propelled railcar configured to carry both passengers and freight

== Other uses ==
- An archaic name for a nickel
- Jitney, a play written by August Wilson and premiered in 1982
- Forklift, also called a jitney
- Jitney Players, a traveling American acting company established in 1923

== See also ==
- Atlantic City Jitney Association, an association of operators of minibus service in Atlantic City, New Jersey, United States
- Hampton Jitney, an American bus company
- Jeepney, Philippine share taxi
