= Travelogue =

Travelogue may refer to:

== Genres ==
- Travel literature, a record of the experiences of an author travelling
- Travel documentary, a documentary film or television program that describes travel in general

== Titles ==
- Travelogue (Joni Mitchell album), a 2002 jazz album
- Travelogue (Kashmir album), a 1994 rock album
- Travelogue (The Human League album), a 1980 electronic album
- Travelogue (TV program), a 2003 Chinese adventure tourism television program
- Travelogue: Blues Traveler Classics, 2002 blues rock album
- Travelogue (The Ren & Stimpy Show), an episode of the American TV series The Ren & Stimpy Show
