= Stravenue =

Road designation particular to Tucson, Arizona

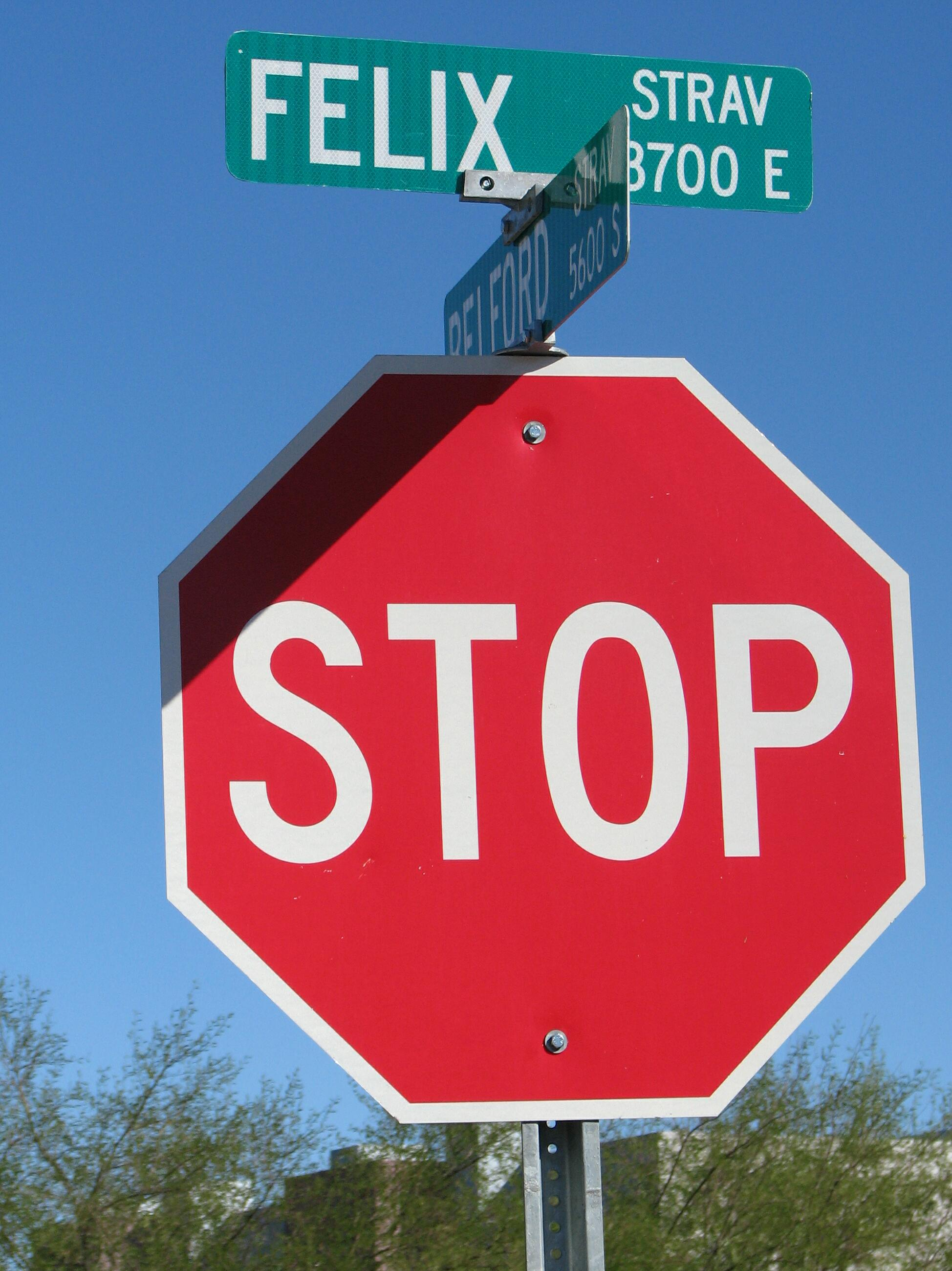
Street signs at intersection of Felix Stravenue (more commonly documented as Felix Boulevard) and Belford Stravenue in Tucson, Arizona.

A stravenue (portmanteau of street and avenue) is a type of road particular to Tucson, Arizona, United States. A stravenue runs "diagonally between and intersects a Street and an Avenue." By convention in Tucson, streets run east–west while avenues run north–south. However, in a few areas of Tucson, primarily around the central part of the city, which is divided by railroad tracks running diagonally from southeast to northwest, builders created small subdivisions of roads and houses that also are laid out on a diagonal basis rather than the normal east–west or north–south. Most of these subdivisions are located near either Benson Highway or Aviation Highway, which also run southeast to northwest.

== Abbreviations ==
The United States Postal Service officially designates STRA as the standard suffix abbreviation for stravenues, and acknowledges the common use of the following additional abbreviations:

- STRAV
- STRAVEN
- STRAVN
- STRVN
- STRVNUE

Street signs may feature the "STRAV" abbreviation.

== Origin ==
Historian and preservationist Demion Clinco identified the earliest recorded appearance of stravenues on a February 1948 plat map of the Country Club Park neighborhood between Aviation Road, Country Club, and 29th Street. The map features six stravenues, and was produced by Tony A. Blanton, a land surveyor at Tucson architectural firm Blanton and Cole. Subsequent plat maps produced by Blanton in May and December 1948 also featured stravenues, and it is likely that he either coined the term or was the first to promote it.

== See also ==
- Stroad
