= Chrislam (disambiguation) =

Chrislam is a blend of Christianity and Islam practiced by the Yoruba of Nigeria.

Chrislam may also refer to:

- Chrislam, a fictional religion in G. K. Chesterton's 1914 novel The Flying Inn
- Chrislam, a fictional religion in Arthur C. Clarke's 1993 novel The Hammer of God
- Chrislam, Jack Van Impe's prediction of a syncretic one-world religion that will form after the Rapture

== See also ==
- Christianity and Islam
- Commission for Religious Relations with Muslims
- Insider_movement#Insider_movements_among_Muslims
