= Japandi =

Japanese interior design style

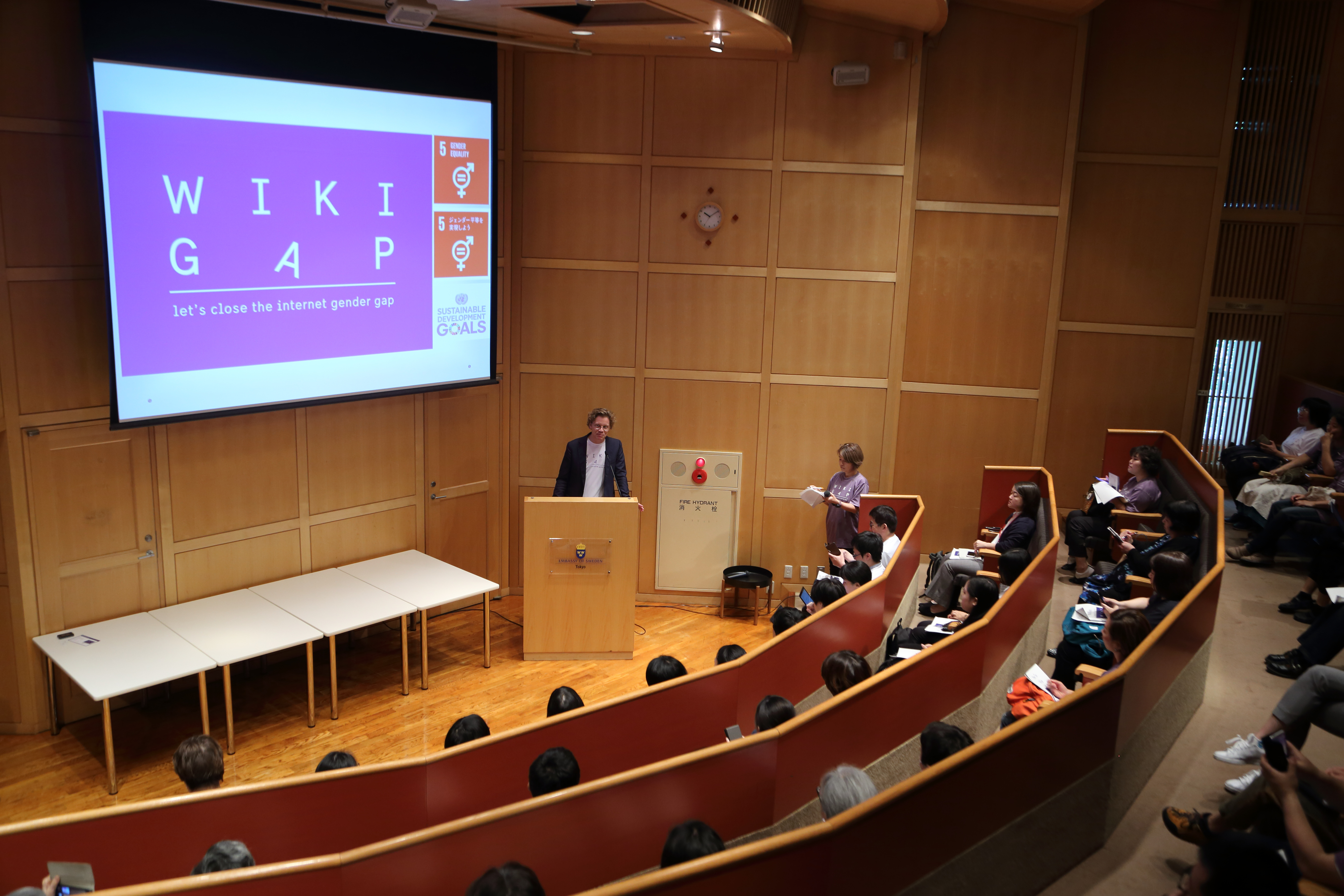
Alfred Nobel Auditorium, Embassy of Sweden, Tokyo

Japandi is an interior design and architecture style that blends Japanese aesthetics and Scandinavian design, mixing Japanese minimalism and Scandinavian simplicity. The neologism is a portmanteau of “Japan” and “Scandi”. The Japandi term emerged around 2016, but much earlier the first examples of the fusion between Japanese and Scandinavian design styles could be seen in ceramic crafts, architecture, and Danish furniture.

Japandi was influenced by design philosophies of Japan wabi sabi and Scandinavia hygge. Details more closely associated with Scandi design and hygge than Japandi include knitted throws, woolen rugs and candles. Japandi borrows Japanese elements such as shoji space dividers, low-profile furniture and Zen-like symbols.

The use of natural materials such as stone, paper, bamboo, and wood is emphasized in Japandi.

The Japandi style features a pared-back colour palette and a minimalist, clutter-free approach to styling. Walls are painted in shades of off-white, beige, or soft grays, amplifying natural light.

A low bed, wooden furniture with a natural finish, and indirect lighting in warm yellow tones helps set a serene, welcoming, and visually light atmosphere in the Japandi style.
