= NyLon =

Concept of New York and London as twin cities

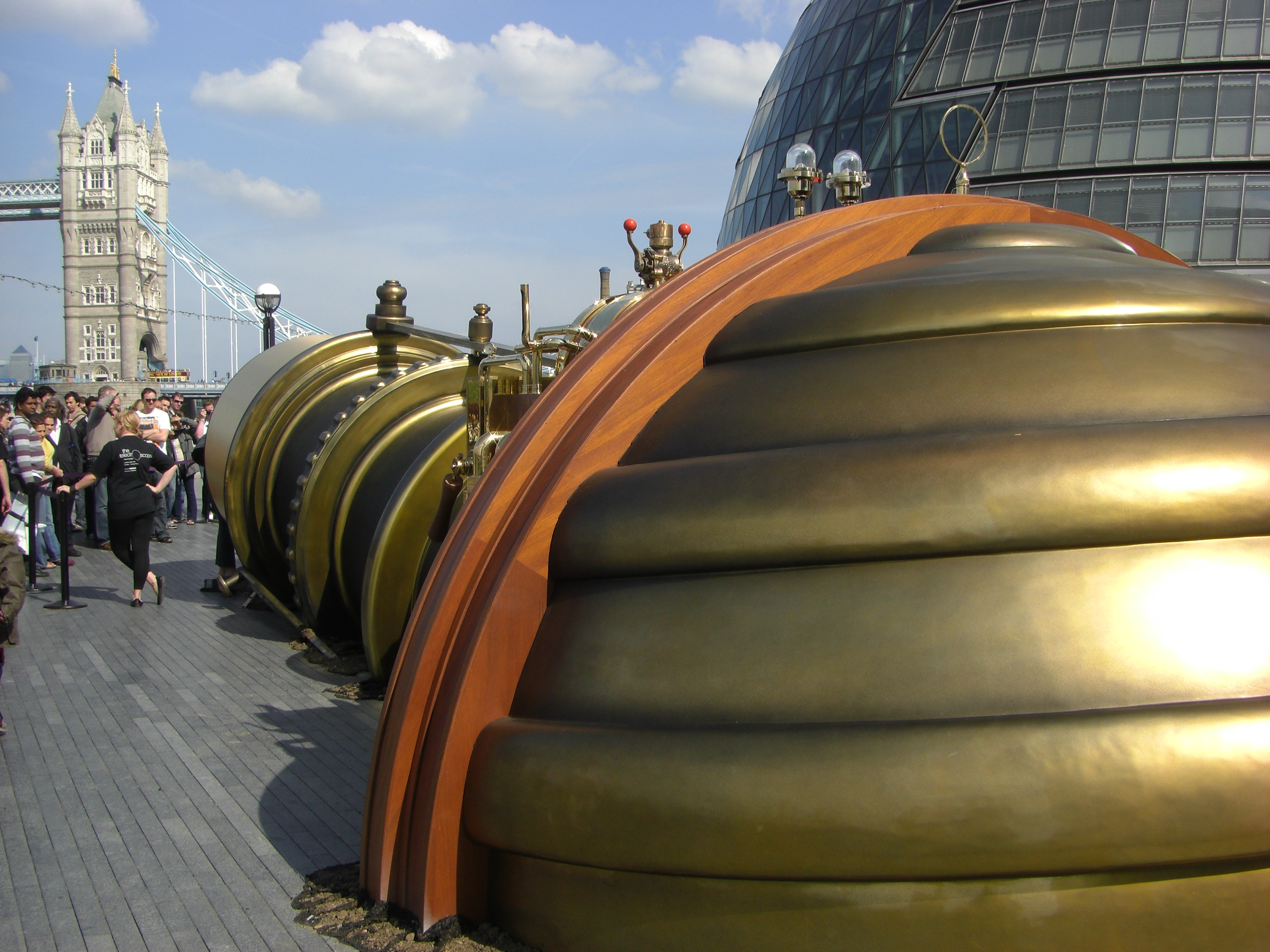
A "telectroscope" was installed in 2008 to visually link London's Tower Bridge with New York's Brooklyn Bridge.

NyLon is the concept of New York City and London as twin cities—the financial, commercial, and cultural capitals of the Anglo-American world. There is a community of high-earning professionals who commute between these cities on the busy transatlantic air route. To satisfy the tastes of this common community, businesses such as Time Out and Conran establish branches in both cities.

The magazine Nylon explicitly covers this scene with articles about the two cities.

== Economics, finance & global influence ==
New York and London are considered the economic epicenters of their respective countries, with Wall Street and Midtown Manhattan in New York, as well as the City of London and Canary Wharf in London, being among the preeminent central business districts in the world. Likewise, the NYSE and LSE are among the largest stock exchanges in the world (with NYSE being the largest).

Additionally, according to the GaWC, London and New York are considered the only two Alpha++-ranked global cities in the world.

The dominance of these twin cities was acknowledged by Christine Lagarde who, as French finance minister, wanted Paris to become a similar international financial centre. Other cities which are becoming city-states in the same class include Dubai and Shanghai. But since the financial crisis and following recession, there has been a decline in travel between the two cities. In 2008, news magazine Time coined the term "Nylonkong" which encompasses the cities of New York City, London, and Hong Kong as the eperopoles of the Americas, Euro-Africa, and the Asia-Pacific, respectively.

The global city network is made up of numerous pairings or city dyads. When the service flows between these dyads were ranked in 2015, NyLon was first. The top 10 were:

1. London – New York
2. London – Hong Kong
3. New York – Hong Kong
4. London – Paris
5. London – Singapore
6. New York – Paris
7. New York – Singapore
8. London – Tokyo
9. London – Shanghai
10. New York – Tokyo

== Recreation, culture & arts ==
Both cities are home to significant cultural centers and landmarks in their respective nations. The two of them are considered among the greatest centers for live theatre and the performing arts in the world. For example, their respective theatre districts – Broadway in New York and the West End in London – together represent the highest pinnacle of live theatre in the English-speaking world and are considered counterparts of one another. Also, both cities host many performing arts, concert, and sports venues, such as The Apollo Theatre, Madison Square Garden, Carnegie Hall, Radio City Music Hall, Barclays Center, Lincoln Center, and BAM in New York and the O2 Arena, Brixton Academy, The National Theatre, the Young Vic, the Old Vic, Shakespeare's Globe, and Barbican Arts Centre in London.

Likewise, both cities host world-famous museums, such as The Met, the MoMA, the Guggenheim, the Brooklyn Museum and the American Museum of Natural History in New York and the Tate Britain, The British Museum, The National Gallery, the V&A, and the Natural History Museum in London.

Both cities are considered fashion capitals and play host, respectively, to one of the "Big Four" fashion weeks: New York Fashion Week and London Fashion Week. Both also host several famous sporting events, including the U.S. Open and Wimbledon.

== Parks, transportation & cityscape ==
While London has significantly more greenspace (with 3,000 parks compared to New York's 1,700), both cities are home to some of the most famous and well-manicured parks in the world, such as Central Park, Riverside Park, Washington Square Park, Prospect Park, Flushing Meadows–Corona Park, and Pelham Bay Park in New York and Hyde Park, Regents Park, Hampstead Heath, Kensington Gardens, and Richmond Park in London.

Place and neighborhood names repeat in both cities, such as Chelsea, London and Chelsea, New York; Soho, London and Soho, New York; and Kensington, London and Kensington, New York. Likewise, several areas demonstrate marked similarities, such as Times Square in New York as compared to Leicester Square or Piccadilly Circus in London.

Additionally, residents of both cities rely heavily on public transportation, with the New York Subway and the London Underground being the main form of transport for New Yorkers and Londoners respectively.

== See also ==
- Global citizenship
- Jet set
- NY-LON—a TV drama set in the two cities
- NYLON—a magazine titled by the concept
- Special Relationship
- Nylonkong
