= Gymnasium =

Gymnasium may refer to:

- Gymnasium (ancient Greece), educational and sporting institution
- Gymnasium (school), type of secondary school that prepares students for higher education
  - Gymnasium (Denmark)
  - Gymnasium (Germany)
- Gymnasium (indoor sports facility), also known as gym, used for physical exercise and sports
- Gymnasium F.C. from Douglas, Isle of Man
- "Gymnasium" (song), a 1984 song by Stephen Cummings

== See also ==
- Gym (disambiguation)
