= Medicare =

Medicare may refer to several publicly funded health insurance programs:

- Medicare (Australia), the publicly funded universal health care insurance scheme in Australia
- Medicare (Canada), an unofficial designation of health care system of Canada
- Medicare (United States), a federal health insurance program in the United States for older people and people with certain disabilities and diseases

== See also ==
- Medibank, Australian private health insurance provider
- Medicaid
- Medicare Resources, Hong Kong
- Medicare Rights Center, United States
