= Nylonkong =

Neologism for New York, London, and Hong Kong

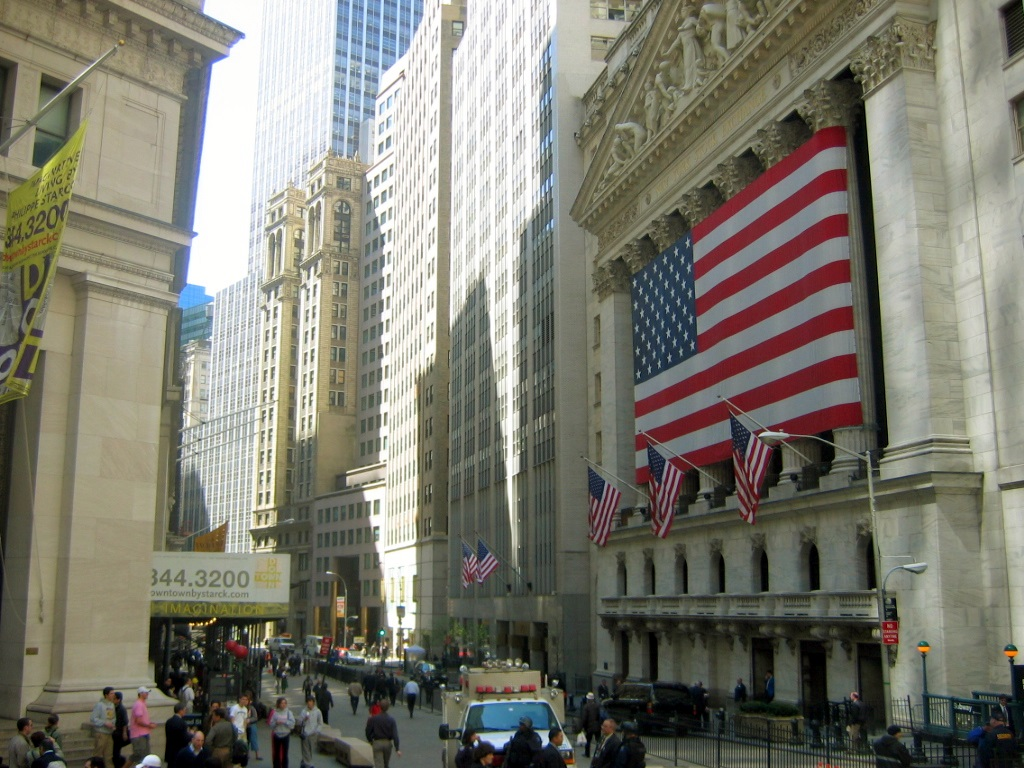
The New York Stock Exchange on Wall Street, the world's largest stock exchange per total market capitalization of its listed companies

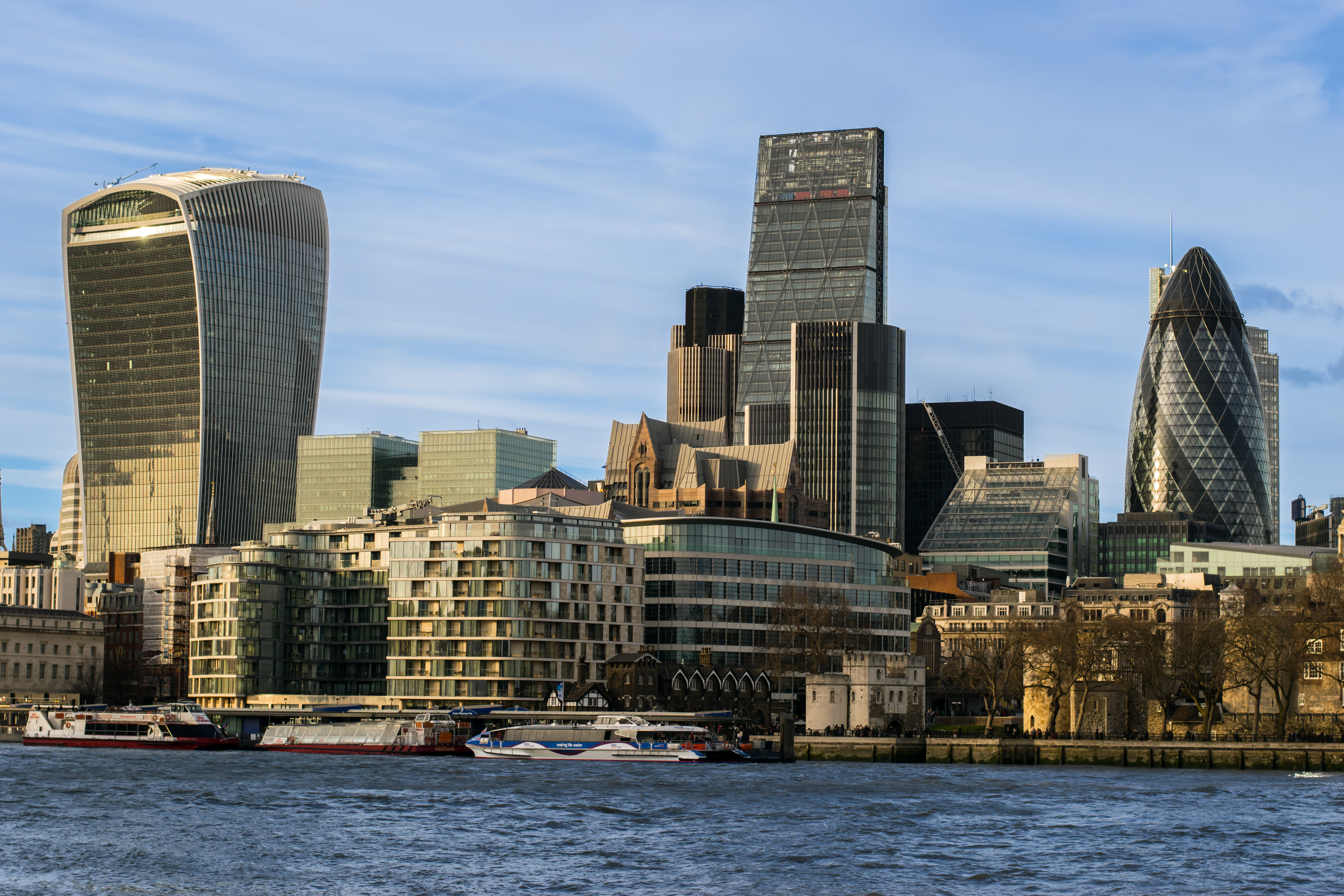
London, one of the Nylonkong metropolises

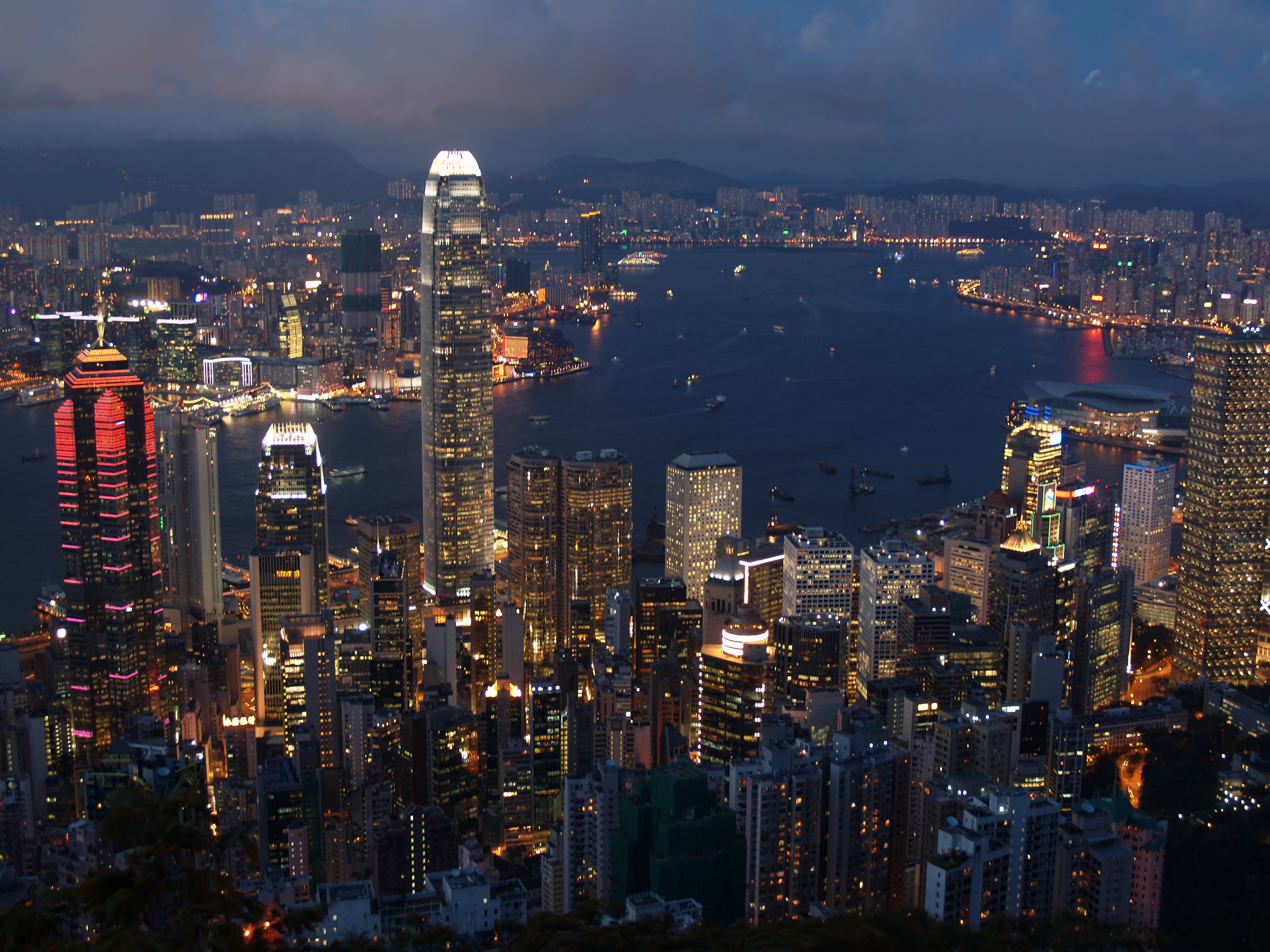
According to Index of Economic Freedom, Hong Kong has had the highest degree of economic freedom in the world since the inception of the Index in 1995 until 2019.

Nylonkong, a contraction of New York–London–Hong Kong, is a neologism coined to link New York City, London, and Hong Kong as the ecumenopolis of the Americas, Euro-Africa, and Asia-Pacific that first appeared in the magazine Time in 2008. The article suggests that the cities share similarities, especially in being globalised financial and cultural centres, and are the most remarkable cities in the 21st century.

== History ==
Nylonkong first appeared in Time article "A Tale of Three Cities" in 2008.

According to Time, these cities share similarities in cultural and economic establishments. They are influential in cultural industries, including art auctions, films, and pop songs. In addition, the cities are top international financial centres located in different time zones. Time further described the cities as the three most remarkable international cities in the 21st century, and one could better understand the world through understanding Nylonkong.

== Influence ==
An extended range of responses was observed in media and academia after the term was coined, such as in the Mingpao Daily. The term was first quoted in academia by Yin Pak Andrew Lau in the Liberal Studies Youth Summit on Basic Law, and Sing Tao Daily suggested that the term is a profound sign of globalization. The influence is substantial and long-lasting, and has imposed a constant check on the achievement of the three financial hubs. In 2016, Lam Hang-chi, an economist, for example, suggested that Nylonkong would fade out if the financial hubs were not constantly competitive. In late 2016, Ta Kung Pao suggested that Hong Kong should not compare itself with New York and London, as the Asian financial center is politically and socially autonomous when compared to the other two, which were only cities; the passage further argues that the autonomous entity of Hong Kong requires more diversified economic development like other Four Asian Tigers economies.

== See also ==
- Multipolar world
- Global capitalism
- NyLon (concept)
