= Quoats =

Governmental Research Project

Quoats was a 60 month research project led by Aberystwyth University (IBERS), and funded by the government, levy boards, and industry groups that aims to develop and apply state-of-the-art genomic and metabolomic tools for the genetic improvement of oats. Its name is a portmanteau of the words quality and oats.

Its focus is on the understanding and manipulation of key traits that will enhance the value of oats in human health improvement, to capitalize on the value of oats as a low-input cereal crop, increase the environmental and economic sustainability of cereal-based rotations, realize the potential of oats as a high-value animal feed and develop new opportunities for using oats for industrial use through advanced fractionation. The project objective is to deliver powerful enabling genetic technologies for the identification of specific genes and markers that will drive the development of breeder–friendly tools accelerating the production of improved oat varieties that will be evaluated and marketed by industrial partners.

Quoats is a multi-disciplinary research programme that combines modern phenotyping methodologies with the expertise of genomics researchers, oat breeders and end-users. It also addresses long-term breeding goals by developing experimental oat populations which are polymorphic for agronomically important traits but more amenable to mapping and forward genetic approaches than conventional agronomic lines.

== Partners ==
Project Partners: The project involves multiple partners, including research institutions, universities, businesses, and industry groups such as:

- ADAS UK Ltd
- Bernard Matthews Ltd
- British Oat and Barley Millers' Association
- DuPont (U.K.) Limited
- Felin Ganol Watermill
- G B Seeds
- Harper Adams University
- James Hutton Institute
- Mole Valley Feed Solutions
- Nairns Oatcakes Ltd
- Oat Services
- Organic Research Centre - Elm Farm
- Phytatec (UK) Ltd
- Poultry Xperience
