= Diabesity =

Global epidemic

Diabesity is a global epidemic characterized by the co-occurrence of obesity and type 2 diabetes; excess body fat is the most significant risk factor for type 2 diabetes.

== Description ==
The global disease burden of obesity and type 2 diabetes has greatly increased since the twentieth century and is projected to continue to increase in the twenty-first century. Although it is not fully understood how insulin resistance develops, lifestyle factors are crucial to the development of both illnesses and excess body fat is the most significant risk factor for type 2 diabetes. Common comorbidities include non-alcoholic fatty liver disease, dyslipidemia, high blood pressure, cardiovascular disease, obstructive sleep apnea, and chronic kidney disease.

Gestational diabetes in women whose pre-pregnancy weight was normal is metabolically distinct from the case where obesity existed prior to pregnancy (termed "gestational diabesity" in one review article).

While altered gut microbiota can lead to the development of diabesity, the reverse is also the case. Therapies aimed at altering gut microbiota are a target of drug discovery and lifestyle interventions.

== Management ==
It is recommended to manage diabesity by a low calorie diet, increased exercise, and where indicated, bariatric surgery. Weight loss of 15 kilograms (33 lb) can reverse type 2 diabetes in around 70 percent of patients. This is difficult for most patients to achieve in practice, but even smaller losses of 5 kilograms (11 lb) can improve diabetes. While some antidiabetic drugs such as insulin can cause weight gain and worsen diabesity, others such as metformin, SGLT-2 inhibitors, and GLP-1 receptor agonists reduce body weight and hyperglycemia. Therefore, the latter are recommended for patients with diabesity.

Cannabinoid receptor antagonists have been developed for diabesity but none are currently approved because of safety concerns.
