= Merger (politics) =

Combination of two or more political or administrative entities

A merger, consolidation or amalgamation, in a political or administrative sense, is the combination of two or more political or administrative entities, such as municipalities (in other words cities, towns, etc.), counties, districts, etc., into a single entity. This term is used when the process occurs within a sovereign entity.

Unbalanced growth or outward expansion of one neighbor may necessitate an administrative decision to merge (see urban sprawl). In some cases, common perception of continuity may be a factor in prompting such a process (see conurbation). Some cities (see below) that have gone through amalgamation or a similar process had several administrative sub-divisions or jurisdictions, each with a separate person in charge.

Municipal annexation is similar to amalgamation, but differs in being applied mainly to two cases:

1. The units joined are sovereign entities before the process, as opposed to being units of a single political entity.
2. A city's boundaries are expanded by adding territories not already incorporated as cities or villages.

== Notable municipal mergers ==
The act of merging two or more municipalities into a single new municipality may be done for a variety of reasons, including urban growth, reducing the cost of local government and improving the efficiency of municipal service delivery.

=== Belgium ===
In 1977, the 2,359 municipalities of Belgium were merged to 596 new municipalities.

=== Brazil ===
In 1975, the state of Guanabara and the state of Rio de Janeiro in Brazil were merged. The former consisted of only the territorial limits of the city of Rio de Janeiro, formerly the Federal District as Brazilian capital until 1960 when it was moved to newly built Brasília. When merged, Guanabara became the municipality of Rio de Janeiro within the new state. In geographical terms, it would seem the state of Rio would have incorporated Guanabara; but, as the administrative and financial resources of the former capital were significant and even larger than the rest of the state, the change was more correctly referred to as a merger (fusão).

=== Canada ===
In Canada, the 1990s saw the forced amalgamation of several municipal entities in the provinces of Nova Scotia, Ontario and Quebec into larger new municipalities. Even in cases where a central city merged with its suburbs, the amalgamated city was legally a new municipality, even if it was given the central city's name and was in effect a defacto annexation by the central city. The process created what was labeled a megacity by the media, although none of the created municipalities fit in the definition of a megacity in the international sense and some of them have fewer than a million inhabitants.

==== New Brunswick ====
- Municipal amalgamations in New Brunswick

==== Nova Scotia ====
- Municipal amalgamations in Nova Scotia

==== Ontario ====
In the early 1970s, the various towns, villages, and townships surrounding Metropolitan Toronto that were undergoing suburbanization were amalgamated into various new suburban municipalities; among them Mississauga and Vaughan. Later, the provincial government of Mike Harris undertook an extensive province-wide program of municipal mergers between 1996 and 2002. The province had 815 municipalities in 1996; by 2002, this had been reduced to just 447. The list of municipalities in Ontario is updated regularly.

- Toronto – In 1967, the towns of Leaside, Long Branch, Mimico, New Toronto, and Weston amalgamated into the various suburban townships within Metropolitan Toronto, which were then promoted to boroughs (with the central City of Toronto annexing – not amalgamating with – the Villages of Forest Hill, North Toronto, and Swansea at the same time). In 1998, the city and former boroughs within Metropolitan Toronto were themselves merged into a new City of Toronto.
- Cambridge – In 1973, the provincial government created the new City of Cambridge by amalgamating the City of Galt, the towns of Preston and Hespeler.
- Thunder Bay – On 1 January 1970, the twin cities of Fort William, and Port Arthur, merged into one city.
- Ottawa – In 2001, the municipalities of Ottawa, Cumberland, Osgoode, Rideau, Goulbourn, West Carleton, Nepean, Kanata, Gloucester, Vanier and Rockcliffe Park amalgamated into a new City of Ottawa.
- Greater Sudbury – resulted from the merger of the former Regional Municipality of Sudbury in 2001; the regional municipality itself was created by a series of municipal amalgamations in 1973.
- Hamilton – In 2001, the former City of Stoney Creek and the former towns of Ancaster, Dundas, Flamborough and Glanbrook merged to create the new City of Hamilton.
- Temiskaming Shores – In 2004, the towns of New Liskeard and Haileybury, along with the township of Dymond, merged to create the new town of Temiskaming Shores.

==== Quebec ====
- Gatineau – five municipalities in southwestern Quebec (Gatineau, Hull, Aylmer, Buckingham and Masson-Angers) were merged into a new city of Gatineau in 2002.
- Longueuil
- Montreal – In the Montreal Merger on 1 January 2002, the Parti Québécois provincial government merged all municipalities on the Island of Montreal into a new City of Montreal. On 1 January 2006, a partial demerger occurred.
- Quebec City
- Rouyn-Noranda
- Saguenay – The cities of Chicoutimi, Jonquière, La Baie and Laterrière, along with the municipalities of Lac-Kénogami and Shipshaw and part of the township of Tremblay, were amalgamated into the City of Saguenay in 2002.
- Sherbrooke
- Trois-Rivières
- Val-d'Or

==== Manitoba ====
- Winnipeg: in 1971, the municipalities of Transcona, St. Boniface, St. Vital, West Kildonan, East Kildonan, Tuxedo, Old Kildonan, North Kildonan, Fort Garry, Charleswood, and St. James were amalgamated via the City of Winnipeg Act. The word unicity is used more commonly than megacity to describe that particular amalgamation.

=== Mainland China ===
The two previously independent cities Hankou and Wuchang, as well as the county of Hanyang, were merged into one city by the name Wuhan in 1927. Wuhan was named China's first direct-controlled municipality, and briefly served as a capital of China twice, first by left-wing Nationalists, later during the Sino-Japanese War.

=== Denmark ===
In 1970, mergers brought the number of municipalities of Denmark from 1,098 to 277. In 2007, the (by then) 270 municipalities were consolidated into 98 municipalities, most of them the result of mergers.

=== Finland ===
Map of the former municipalities that together merged the town of Sastamala in Pirkanmaa, Finland.

A series of mergers has reduced the number of municipalities of Finland from 452 in 2000 to 311 in 2017. By 2025, the number of municipalities has reduced further to 308.

=== Germany ===
Several states of West Germany carried out municipal merger programmes in the 1960s and 1970s. In Baden-Württemberg, the number of municipalities dropped from 3,379 to 1,110 between 1968 and 1975; in Bavaria, from roughly 7,000 to roughly 2,000 between 1972 and 1978; in Hesse, from 2,642 to 421 between 1972 and 1977; in North Rhine-Westphalia, from 2,365 to 396 between 1967 and 1975; and in Saarland, from 345 to 50 in 1974. In the Bavarian town of Ermershausen, citizens occupied the town hall to resist the merger with Maroldsweisach – unsuccessfully, although Ermershausen was reconstituted as an independent municipality in 1994 – and Horgau, also in Bavaria, successfully appealed its merger with Zusmarshausen to the Constitutional Court of Bavaria (Bayerischer Verfassungsgerichtshof). Mergers have also taken place in the former East Germany after 1990, for example in Brandenburg in 2003.

=== Greece ===
The Kallikratis Plan replaced the 1033 municipalities and communities of Greece with 325 new municipalities in 2011.

=== Hungary ===
Budapest, the capital and largest city in Hungary, was formed from the merger of the cities of Buda and Pest across the river Danube in 1873.

=== Indonesia ===
There had been mergers of administrative divisions in Indonesia, but these examples are much rarer than the creation of new administrative entities. Merger of the Special Region of Surakarta into Central Java in 1946, is the only instance of provincial merger in the country. On 18 October 1951, Adikarto Regency was merged into Kulon Progo Regency in the Special Region of Yogyakarta. In 2003, several administrative cities (kota administratif) in Indonesia were merged back to the parent regencies, due to the Government Regulation no. 33 of 2003 which removed their status. All other administrative cities had become autonomous before 2003.

- Baturaja into Ogan Komering Ulu Regency, South Sumatra
- Cilacap into Cilacap Regency, Central Java
- Jember into Jember Regency, East Java
- Kisaran into Asahan Regency, North Sumatra
- Klaten into Klaten Regency, Central Java
- Purwokerto into Banyumas Regency, Central Java
- Rantau Prapat into Labuhanbatu Regency, North Sumatra
- Watampone into Bone Regency, South Sulawesi

Since 2006, several villages in Porong district, Sidoarjo, East Java have been become abandoned due to being submerged by the Sidoarjo mud flow. Proposed in July 2020, this regional regulation would merge numerous villages with nearby ones. The villages of Siring and Jatirejo would be merged with Gedang, Mindi with Porong, Renokenongo with Glagaharum, Kedungbendo with Gempolsari and Ketapang, Pejarakan with Kedungcangkring, and Besuki with Keboguyang.

On 13 June 2024, the district of Anggotoa in Konawe Regency, Southeast Sulawesi was legally merged back into Wawotobi after being created as its own district in 2017, due to issues relating to the deficient number of villages in Anggotoa.

=== Israel ===
In 2003 the cities of Baqa al-Gharbiyye and Jatt joined to form the city of Baqa-Jatt, but the merger was dissolved in 2010.

=== Malaysia ===
On 21 April 2018, The Negeri Sembilan state government declared of Seremban Municipal Council (MPS) and Nilai Municipal Council (MPN) were to become Seremban City Council (MBS) effective in January 2019.

=== New Zealand ===
In November 2010, the Seven Councils of Auckland City: Auckland City Council, Manukau City Council, Waitakere City Council, North Shore City Council, Papakura District Council, Rodney District Council and most of Franklin District Council has seen amalgamated to form Auckland City Council.

=== Philippines ===
In the Philippines, Iloilo City is a consolidation of former towns, which are now the geographical or administrative districts consisting of: Villa de Arevalo, Iloilo City Proper, Jaro (an independent city before), La Paz, Mandurriao, and Molo. The district of Lapuz, a former part of La Paz, was declared a separate district in 2008.

=== Portugal ===
Portugal was one of the first countries in the world to make an enlarged modern administrative reform, particularly during the 19th century. In the early 19th century, the country was divided into more than 800 municipalities. In 1832, during Portuguese Civil War, a law from Mouzinho da Silveira, minister from the liberal government-in-exile (which then ruled only in the Azores) simplified the public administration, and reduced the number of municipalities to 796. In 1836, after the liberal victory, Passos Manuel, minister from the government of the Marquess of Sá da Bandeira made a profound administrative reform which reduced significantly the number of municipalities, fixing it to 351. Passos Manuel's reform followed a trend very decentralist, creating an elected municipal administration. In 1855, another series of mergers reduced the number of municipalities to 254. In the rest of the 19th century, some series of mergers occurred (particularly during the 1890s), meanwhile other municipalities were restored. Thereafter, the changes to the municipal map focused mainly on the restoration and creation of new municipalities, particularly in the 20th century. Nowadays, there are 308 municipalities in Portugal. The last alteration to the municipal map, occurred in 1998, with the creation of the municipalities of Odivelas (in Lisbon district), Trofa (in Porto district) and Vizela (in Braga district).

In 2013, more than 1,000 parishes/freguesias were merged.

=== Sweden ===
Many rural municipalities of Sweden were merged in 1952; the number of them decreasing from 2,281 to 816. Another series of mergers, this time also including cities and market towns, reduced the total number of municipalities from roughly 1,000 in the early 1960s to 278 in 1974. As of 2013, Sweden has 290 municipalities.

=== United States ===
In United States politics, such a merged entity may be called a consolidated city–county.

- City of Greater New York – The amalgamation of the five boroughs (Manhattan, The Bronx, Brooklyn, Queens, and Staten Island) of New York.
- Unigov – The local government amalgamation of Indianapolis, Indiana.
- In New Jersey, Princeton Borough and Princeton Township became one municipality (Princeton, New Jersey), in January 2013, after voters passed a referendum in early November 2011, supported by residents of both municipalities.
- Bellingham, Washington was formed in 1903 with the merger of four cities along Bellingham Bay: Fairhaven and Bellingham (which had merged in 1890 as Fairhaven) as well as Whatcom and Sehome (which had merged in 1891 as New Whatcom).
- Winston-Salem, North Carolina was formed in 1913 with the official merger of the two neighboring towns of Winston and Salem which locals had already been viewing as one place. In light of the merger of these two towns, one of Winston-Salem's nicknames is "Twin City".
- The Arkansas cities of Helena and West Helena consolidated in 2006 as Helena-West Helena, intending to reduce duplicated government functions and improve services.
- In the Illinois suburbs of St. Louis, the villages of Cahokia and Alorton and the city of Centreville merged in 2021 to create the new city of Cahokia Heights, in order to consolidate their financially-stressed municipal governments.

== See also ==
- Municipal annexation
- Urban agglomeration
- Combined statistical area
- Conurbation
- Ecumenopolis
- Ekistics
- List of double placenames
- Independent city, the opposite of a consolidated city–county
- City-state
- Megalopolis
- Megacity
- Metropolitan area
- Metropolis
