= Yitzhak Reiter =

Israeli political scientist (born 1952)

- יצחק רייטר
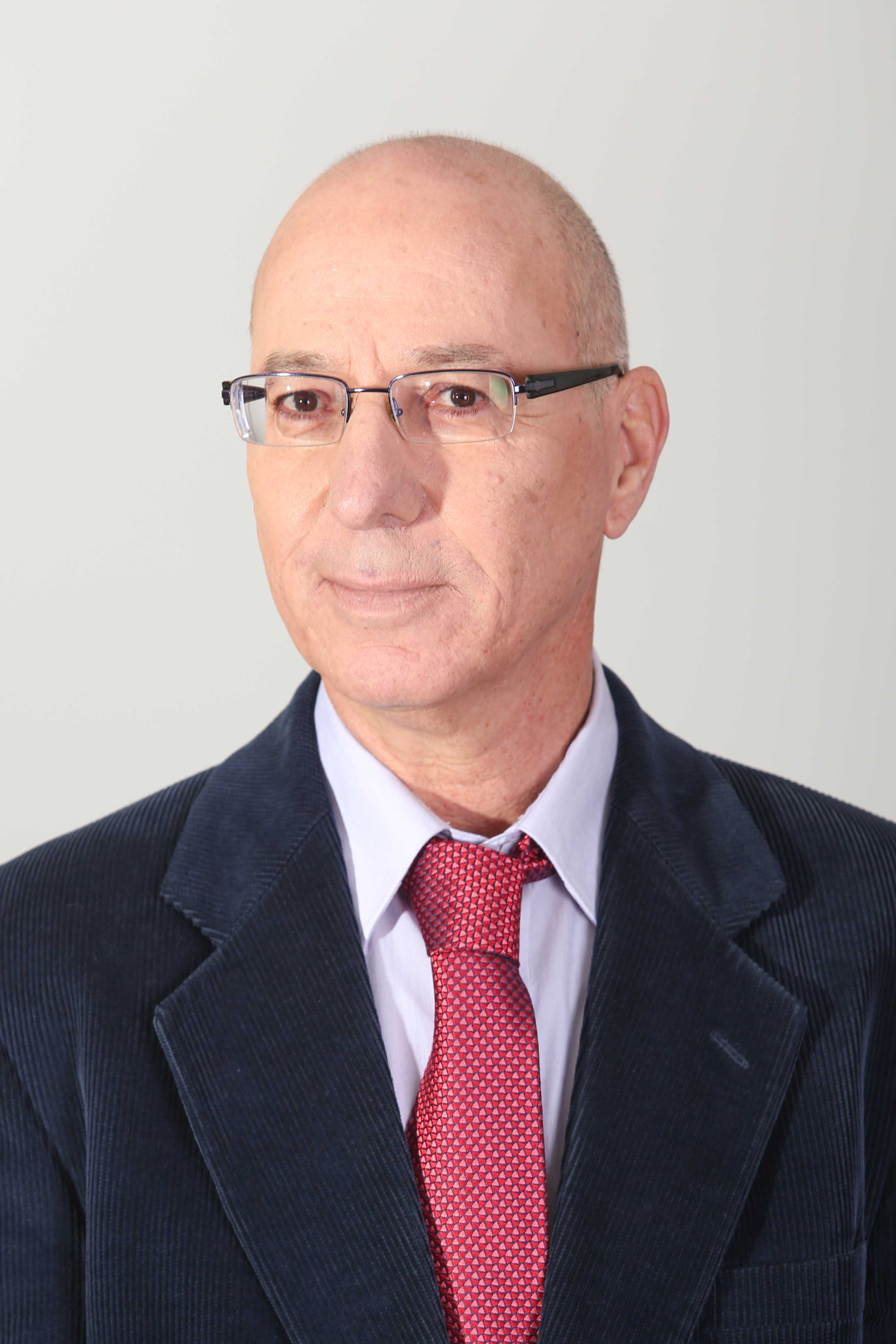
- Portrait of Yitzhak Reiter
- Scientific career
- Fields: Political science
- Institutions: Reichman University; Al-Qasemi College; Jerusalem Institute for Policy Research
- Thesis: הווקף המוסלמי בירושלים בתקופת המנדט כפי שהוא משתקף מרשומות (סג'ל) בית-הדין השרעי (1990)

Yitzhak Reiter (Hebrew: יצחק רייטר) is an Israeli political scientist. He is a professor specializing in Israel studies and Islamic and Middle East history and politics, teaching at Reichman University and Al-Qasemi College. A senior researcher at the Jerusalem Institute for Policy Research, he formerly chaired the Department of Israel Studies at Ashkelon Academic College.

== Books ==
=== Author ===
- Contested Holy Places in Israel-Palestine: Sharing and Conflict Resolution (London and New York: Routledge, 2017).
- The Eroding Status Quo: Conflict over Controlling the Temple Mount (Jerusalem: The Jerusalem Institute for Israel Studies and Multieducator 2017.
- Feminism in the Temple: The Struggle of the Women of the Wall to Change the Status Quo (Jerusalem: The Jerusalem Institute for Israel Studies 2017, in Hebrew)
- Contesting Symbolic Landscape in Jerusalem: Jewish/Islamic Conflict over Museum of Tolerance at Mamilla Cemetery. Brighton, Chicago, Toronto: Sussex Academic Press and The Jerusalem Institute for Israel Studies, 2014 (also in Hebrew and Arabic editions).
- A City with a Mosque in Its Heart (with Lior Lehrs, Jerusalem: The Jerusalem Institute for Israel Studies, 2013, in Hebrew.
- War, Peace and International Relations in Islam: Muslim Scholars on Peace Accords with Israel (Brighton, Portland and Toronto: Sussex Academic Press, 2011 also in Hebrew and Arabic editions)
- The Sheikh Jarrah Affair: Strategic Implications of Jewish Settlement in an Arab Neighborhood in East Jerusalem (with Lior Lehrs, Jerusalem: The Jerusalem Institute for Israel Studies, 2010).
- National Minority, Regional Majority: Palestinian Arabs versus Jews in Israel (Syracuse University Press, 2009)
- Jerusalem and its Role in Islamic Solidarity (New York: Palgrave Macmillan, 2008).
- Islamic Institutions in Jerusalem: Palestinian Muslim Administration under Jordanian and Israeli Rule. The Hague, London and Boston: Kluwer Law International, 1997).
- Islamic Endowments in Jerusalem under British Mandate. London and Portland OR: Frank Cass, 1996).
- The Political Life of Arabs in Israel. (with Reuben Aharoni, Beit Berl: The Institute for Israeli Arab Studies, first ed. 1992, second revised ed. 1993, in Hebrew).
- Islamic Awqaf in Jerusalem 1948-1990. Jerusalem: The Jerusalem Institute for Israel Studies, 1991. [Hebrew].

=== Editor ===
- The Arab Society in Israel (with Orna Cohen, Neve Ilan: Abraham Fund Initiatives, 2013, in Hebrew).
- Religion and Politics: Sacred Space in Palestine and Israel (with Breger, M. J., and Hammer L., London and New York: Routledge, 2012).
- Holy Places in the Israeli-Palestinian Conflict: Confrontation and Co-existence (with Breger, M. J., and Hammer L., London and New York: Routledge, 2009.)
- Dilemmas in Jewish-Arab Relations in Israel (Tel-Aviv: Schocken, 2005, in Hebrew).
- Sovereignty of God and Man: Sanctity and Political Centrality on the Temple Mount (Jerusalem: The Jerusalem Institute for Israel Studies, 2001 in Hebrew).
