= Princes Park, Carlton =

Park in Melbourne, Australia

Princes Park
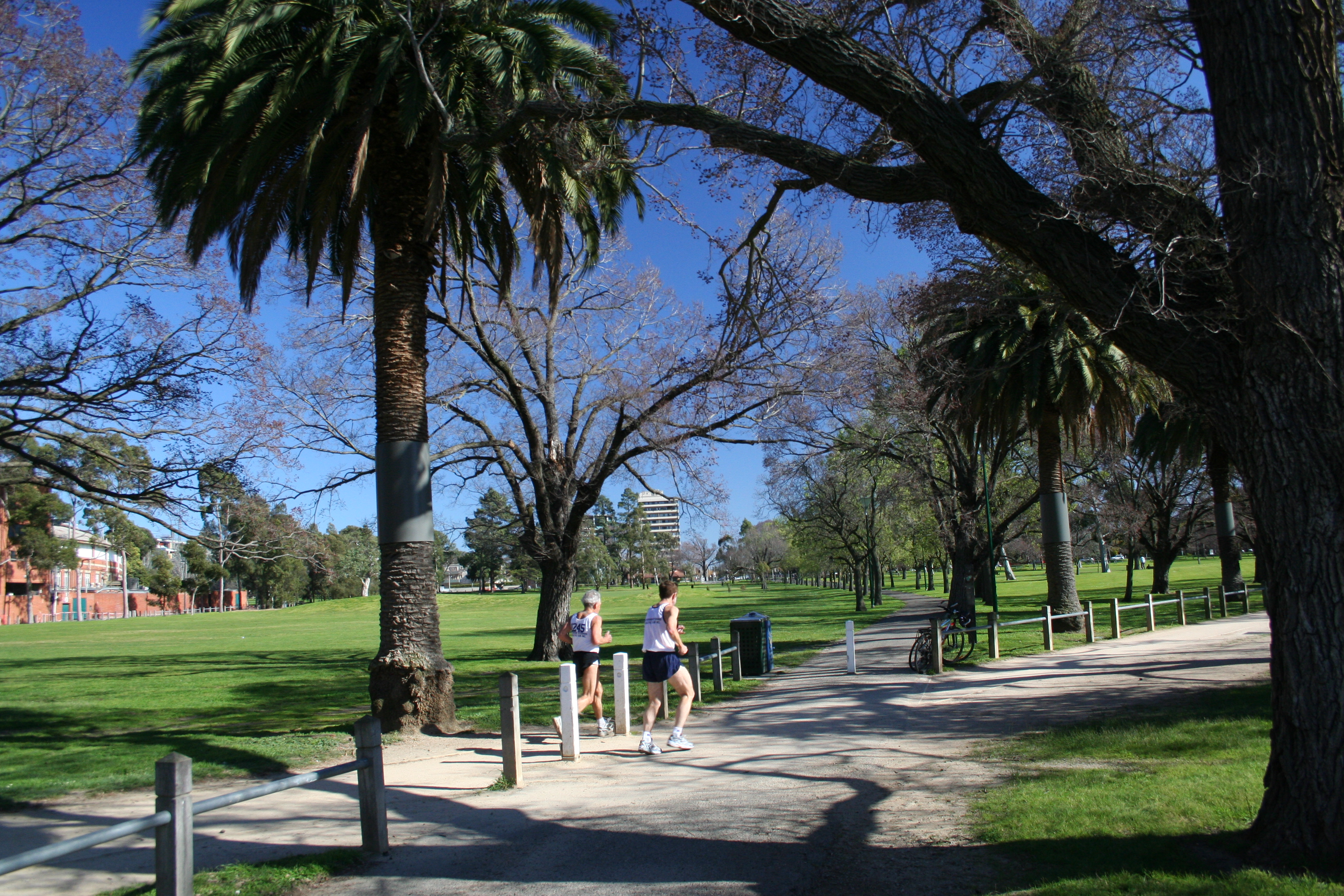
- The park, with Carlton FC ground, far left

- Location within Melbourne
- Interactive map of Princes Park
- Type: Urban park
- Location: Carlton North, Melbourne, Victoria, Australia
- Coordinates: 37°47′01″S 144°57′43″E
- Area: 38.6 ha (95 acres)
- Established: 9 June 1873; 153 years ago
- Founder: J. J. Casey
- Etymology: Albert, Prince Consort
- Operator: City of Melbourne
- Open: 24/7 all year
- Status: Open
- Hiking trails: 3.183 km (1.978 mi) running track
- Public transit: –; – 505; – Capital City Trail
- Landmarks: Princes Park (stadium); Princes Park Carlton Bowls Club; Princes Hill Tennis Club
- Facilities: Barbecues; dog-walking areas; playgrounds; picnic facilities; running track; sporting fields for cricket, Australian Rules football, lawn bowls, touch football and soccer; tennis courts; toilets; water fountains
- Website: melbourne.vic.gov.au/princes-park

The Princes Park is a 38.6-hectare (95-acre) urban park in Carlton North, an inner-city suburb of Melbourne, Victoria, Australia. Established in 1873, the park is situated directly north of the University of Melbourne and bounded on its eastern and western sides by the Melbourne General Cemetery and Royal Parade respectively.

== Description ==
The park includes a number of Australian rules football ovals, the bowling green of the Princes Park Carlton Bowls Club, and a small stretch of open parkland. It is best known as the location of Ikon Park, the former Princes Park Football Ground, the home of the Carlton Football Club. The park also contains a children's playground, the Within Three Worlds sculpture, a barbecue area, and picnic facilities.

The Capital City Trail passes through the northern section of the park, following the path of the now-closed Inner Circle railway line.

The 3.183-kilometre (2 mi) running track around the perimeter of the park is made of compacted gravel and drains well in wet weather. The track is used for competitive running and walking events and for recreational use. Events held include the Sri Chinmoy Princes Park Winter Running Festival, Victorian Road Runners Princes Park Fun Run, and the Parkville parkrun.

== History ==
Named in honour of Albert, Prince Consort, the park's site was originally proclaimed as "Prince's Park" on 9 June 1873 under The Land Act 1869 by the Minister for Lands and Agriculture, J. J. Casey, and its size was expressed as 39 hectares (97 acres). It was established at the same time as several other parks. Prior to its use as a park, the northern section of the park was initially swamp land, and some parts were used as a rubbish tip prior to 1897. The stadium was developed for the Carlton Football Club in the late 1890s.

In January 2006 and 2007 Big Day Out, a popular music festival, was held at Princes Park on the ovals at the park's southern end. The event's traditional venue, the Royal Melbourne Showgrounds was unavailable due to redevelopment.

In 2018, Australian comedian and actress Eurydice Dixon, was murdered by Jaymes Todd in the park. Todd pleaded guilty to the charges of rape and murder and was sentenced to life imprisonment. An appeal against the sentence on the grounds that it was excessive, considering his guilty plea and diagnosis of Asperger syndrome, was denied.

== Gallery ==
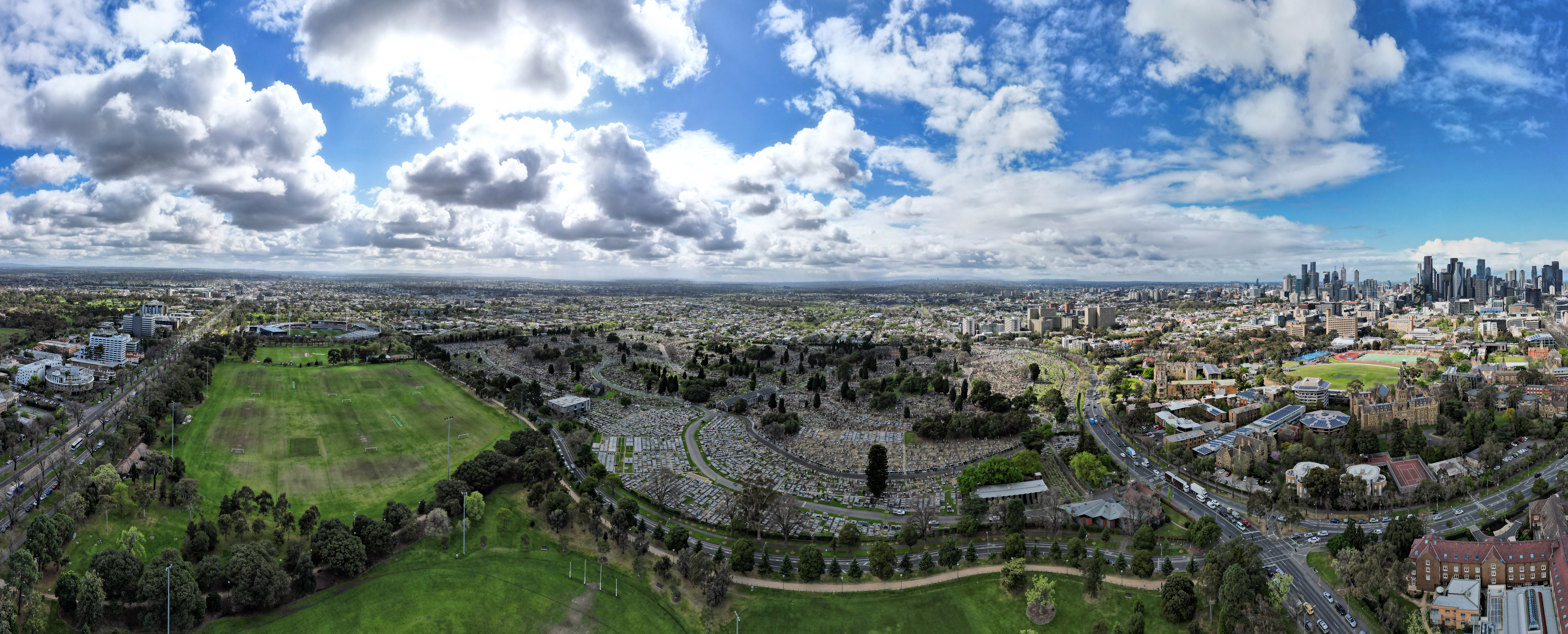
Aerial view of the park and the Melbourne General Cemetery, 2023

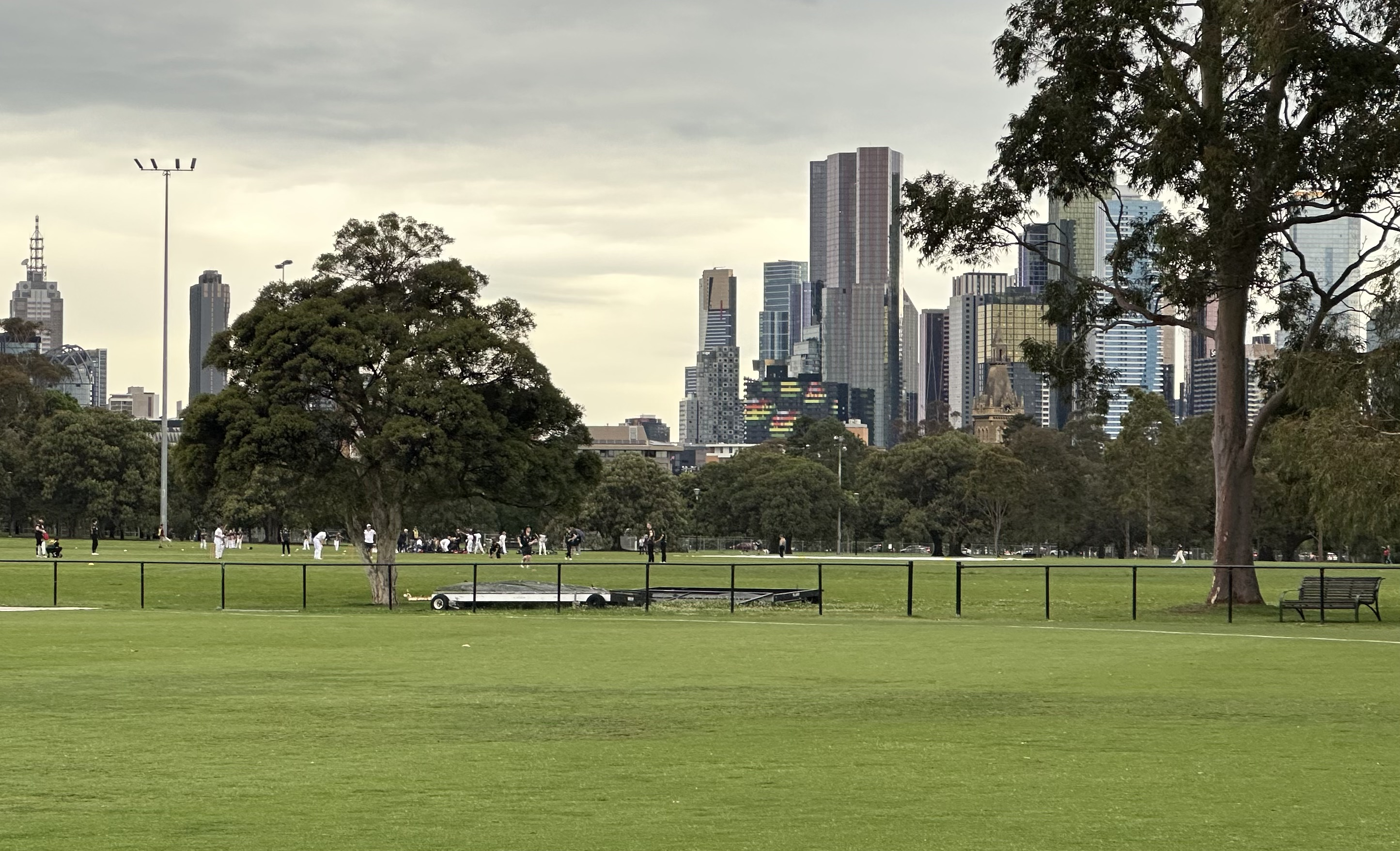
Ovals at the park, looking towards the city

== See also ==
- Princes Park (stadium)
- Parks and gardens of Melbourne
