= Murder of Aya Maasarwe =

2019 killing of a university student in Melbourne

- Aya Maasarwe (Instagram)
- Date: 16 January 2019
- Location: Bundoora, Victoria
- Deaths: Aya Maasarwe
- Burial: Baqa al-Gharbiyye, Israel
- Convicted: Codey Herrmann
- Verdict: Guilty
- Convictions: Rape, murder
- Sentence: 36 years (30 years non-parole)

On 16 January 2019, Aya Maasarwe (alt: Aiia Maasarwe, Arabic: آية مصاروة Hebrew: איה מסארוה, [aˈja masaʁˈve]), a Palestinian with Israeli citizenship who was studying at La Trobe University in Melbourne, Australia as an exchange student, was killed as she returned home from an evening at a comedy club in North Melbourne. The violent, random nature of the killing sparked renewed community concern about the safety of women, especially after dark in Melbourne. Parallels were drawn to the murders of Eurydice Dixon, Jill Meagher and Maša Vukotić. Maasarwe was buried in her hometown of Baqa al-Gharbiyye, Israel.

== Background ==
Aya Maasarwe was born in 1997 in Baqa al-Gharbiyye, Israel, to a Palestinian Muslim family. She was studying at Shanghai University, and was in Melbourne as part of a student exchange program with La Trobe University. Maasarwe was undertaking a business degree intending to work later at her father's firm in China.

== Murder and aftermath ==
Victoria Police believe Maasarwe was attacked sometime after midnight on 16 January 2019, around 50 m (160 ft) from a tram stop on the corner of Plenty Road and Main Drive in the suburb of Bundoora. She had been returning home after attending a performance at a comedy club in North Melbourne and was on a video call with her sister. Maasarwe's body was discovered around 7 am in shrubbery near the carpark of Polaris 3083 Town Centre shopping mall by maintenance workers. Items of clothing, suspected to belong to her attacker, were located within 100 m (330 ft) of her body.

On 18 January, 20-year-old vagrant Codey Herrmann was arrested in Pioneer Reserve, a park in the nearby suburb of Greensborough. The following day he was charged with Maasarwe's rape and murder. He appeared in the Melbourne Magistrates' Court and was remanded in custody.

According to police investigators, Herrmann initially "struck her four times from behind with a 60-centimetre metal pipe without warning". He then dragged Maasarwe onto a patch of grass near the Polaris shopping centre where "he raped her and struck her another nine times to the head with the pipe, before spraying cleaning agent WD-40 over her body and setting it alight with a barbecue lighter, most likely when she was dead".

On 21 January the family received the body of Maasarwe from the coroner. In the suburb of Dandenong at the Albanian Mosque, family along with supporters gathered for the Janazah (Islamic funeral rites) and prayer service for Maasarwe. The family returned to Israel on 22 January with her body. She was buried in her home town of Baqa al-Gharbiyye. Her family later created a scholarship for Palestinian doctors in her name.

== Perpetrator ==
Codey Herrmann was 20 years old at the time of the murder and had no previous criminal record. He was an Aboriginal Australian who had been born to a teenage mother. As a young child he was subject to "extreme physical and emotional deprivation". He was abandoned by his mother, who had a substance addiction, and placed into care at the age of 18 months, with over 2,000 pages of case files held by the Victorian Aboriginal Child Care Agency. He suffered from scabies, rotten teeth and skin problems due to neglect.

Herrmann had "severe behaviour problems" as a child and was violent against other children. At the time of the murder he had been homeless for several years and was diagnosed with drug-induced psychosis and severe personality disorder. According to The Age, he frequently shoplifted and "when his Centrelink payments came through, Herrmann bought methamphetamine and cannabis and shared them with his friends".

== Court proceedings ==
Herrmann pleaded guilty to the rape and murder of Maasarwe. On 29 October 2019, he was sentenced to 36 years in prison with a 30-year non-parole period. Elizabeth Hollingworth, the presiding judge in the Supreme Court of Victoria, applied the Verdins principles to reduce Herrmann's sentence, finding that his moral culpability was reduced due to his mental health difficulties.

In November 2019, the Victorian Director of Public Prosecutions appealed Herrmann's sentence as "manifestly inadequate" on the grounds that he should have been sentenced to life imprisonment. It was argued that he posed a substantial risk to the community if he was ever released. Chris Maxwell, the president of the Victorian Court of Appeal, directed both the prosecutors and Herrmann's lawyers to present evidence of how Herrmann's "indigenous disadvantage" may have affected his actions.

In June 2021, the Court of Appeal ruled that the original sentence should stand and that the original judge was "justified in setting the sentence she did, as she took into account Herrmann’s disadvantaged background" and assessed his prospects of rehabilitation as "fair".

== Reactions ==
Victorian Premier Daniel Andrews, in a statement condemning the killing, said that "sexist attitudes in our society" needed to change to end the problem of violence against women in Australia. Andrews stated that "Victorians are united in sadness. In anger that this bright young woman’s life was taken from her. I hope we are also united in determination. That we can – and must – end this culture of violence against women."
