= Murder of Eurydice Dixon =

Murder of female comedian in Australia

- Location: Princes Park, Melbourne, Australia
- Date: 13 June 2018; 8 years ago
- Attack type: Murder
- Deaths: 1
- Victim: 1
- Perpetrator: Jaymes Todd

Eurydice Jane Dixon (10 November 1995 – 13 June 2018) was an Australian comedian and actress who performed regularly at comedy venues in Melbourne, Victoria. She was found murdered at Melbourne's Princes Park on 13 June 2018; her death was the subject of much media attention.

== Education and career ==
Dixon studied drama at Deakin University. During her time there, she appeared in the role of Justine in Burwood Student Theatre Company's production of Cosi in 2014. She belonged to and often performed with the Moreland Theatre Company (an amateur theatre company in the northern suburbs of Melbourne where she lived) and performed in RMIT's yearly "Snatches" run of short plays.

In 2018, Dixon made her Melbourne International Comedy Festival debut with her solo stand-up comedy show, At Home, I Feel Like a Tourist at Melbourne's Highlander Bar.

== Death and public reaction ==
On the morning of 13 June 2018, Dixon was found dead at Melbourne's Princes Park. She had been walking home from a performance at Highlander Bar the night before when she was attacked, raped, and murdered by 19-year-old Broadmeadows hospitality student, Jaymes Todd, who handed himself into police after CCTV footage of him was released.

Todd pleaded guilty to her rape and murder on 8 November 2018. On 2 September 2019, Todd was sentenced to life in prison. Todd will serve a minimum of 35 years in prison before being eligible to apply for parole. Todd appealed his sentence on the grounds that it was excessive, considering his guilty plea and diagnosis of Asperger syndrome; the appeal was denied.

Dixon's death attracted mass media coverage and she became the subject of many tributes on social media, notably from fellow comedians Julia Morris, Paula Ferrari, Alex Lee and Jane Kennedy among many others.

A vigil was held at the soccer pitch at Princes Park where her body was found on 18 June; it was attended by about ten thousand people, including Victorian state Premier Daniel Andrews. Then Prime Minister Malcolm Turnbull and Opposition leader Bill Shorten attended a vigil at Parliament House in Canberra, which also saw a large turnout. The morning of the vigil, offensive paint markings were found at the site of the floral tributes to Dixon. Andrew Nolch, a men's rights activist, was found guilty of criminal damage and sentenced over the vandalism in September 2018.

On 17 March 2019, the Victorian State government announced the "Stand Up!" grants for rising female comedians in her memory. Susan Provan, the director of the Melbourne International Comedy Festival, said "The Stand Up! grant is inspired by the promise and ambition of Eurydice Dixon, a much-loved emerging comedian who friends remember as brilliant, brave and beautiful, unafraid to delve into challenging material and with a big bold laugh that filled a room."

Also in 2019 No Apologies, a book by Joanne Brookfield on Australian female comedians was dedicated to Eurydice Dixon. It included a description of Eurydice Dixon and of her comedy act, and of the reaction of the Melbourne comedy community to her death.

== See also ==
- Disappearance of Sarah MacDiarmid
- Murder of Aya Maasarwe
- Murder of Jill Meagher
