= Baqa-Jatt =

City in Haifa, Israel

Baqa-Jatt: באקה-ג'ת; باقة جتّ
- City

Hebrew transcription(s)
  - Also spelled: Baqa-Jat (official)
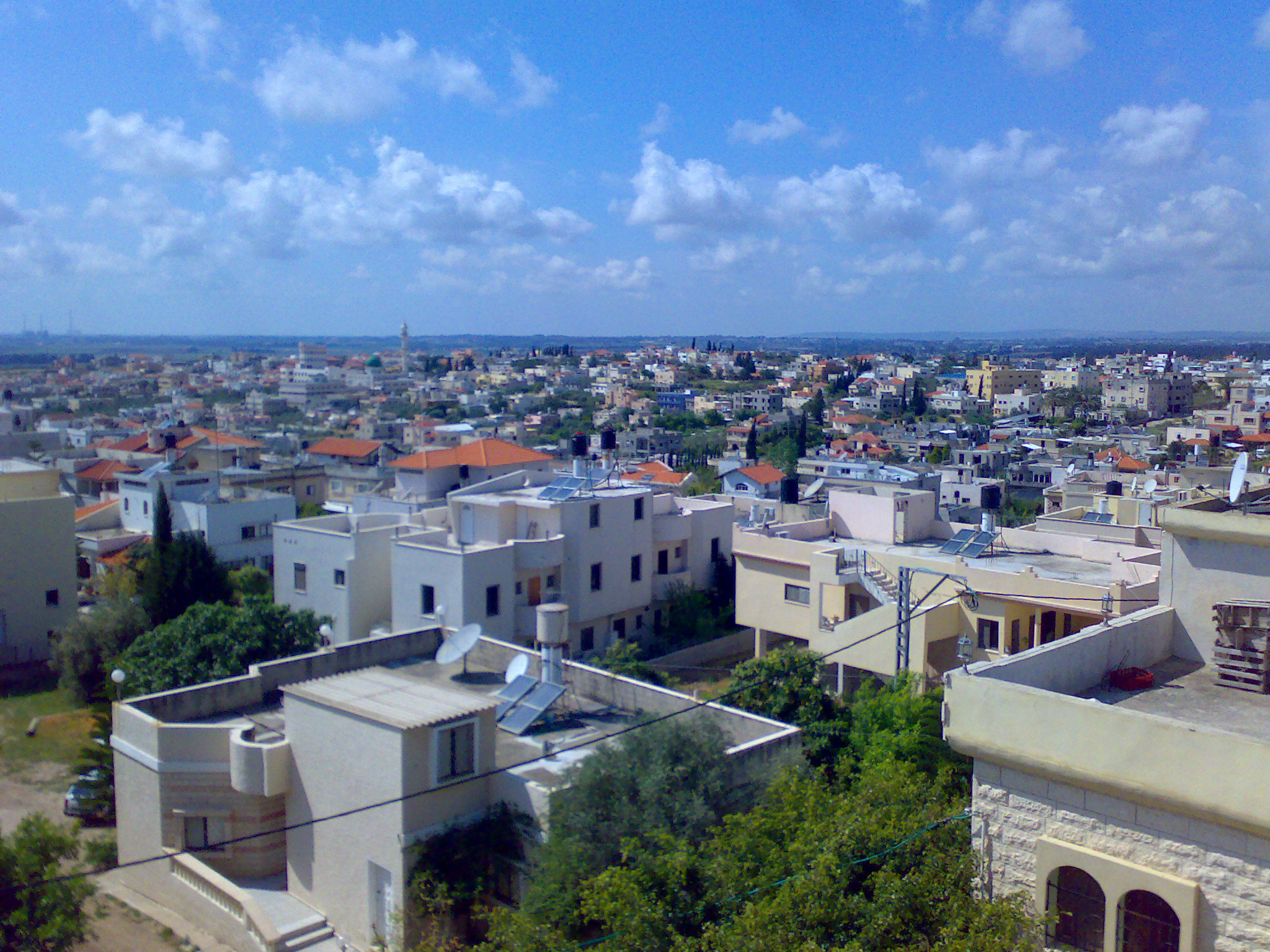
- A residential area in Baqa al-Gharbiyye

- Location within Haifa region of Israel Location within Israel
- Coordinates: 32°24′59.22″N 35°2′53.87″E
- Country: Israel
- District: Haifa

Area
  - Total: 16,392 dunams (16.392 km^{2}; 6.329 sq mi)

Baqa-Jatt was an Israeli Arab city in the Haifa District of Israel established in 2003 through a merger of Baqa al-Gharbiyye and Jatt. However, the merger was dissolved on 1 November 2010. Encompassing an area of 18,100 dunams (18.1 km²), Baqa-Jatt was part of the region known as the Triangle.

== Demographics ==
According to CBS, in 2005 the ethnic makeup of the city was entirely Arab, with no Jews. A total of 48.8% residents were 19 years of age or younger, 16.1% between 20 and 29, 19.3% between 30 and 44, 10.4% from 45 to 59, 2.1% from 60 to 64, and 3.3% 65 years of age or older. The population growth rate in 2005 was 2.36%. The population in 2007 was 32,400—an increase of approximately 700 since the previous year.

== Education ==
According to CBS, there were 10 schools and 5,391 students in Baqa-Jatt in 2005: six elementary schools with an enrollment of 3,194 students, and four post-elementary schools (Baqa-Jatt does not divide between middle and secondary) with 2,197 students. 57.8% of 12th grade students were entitled to a matriculation certificate in 2005.

== Income ==
According to CBS, as of 2005, there were 7,175 salaried workers and 1,216 self-employed in Baqa-Jatt. The mean monthly wage in 2004 for a salaried worker in the city was 4,340 NIS, a positive change of 14.7% compared to 2004. Salaried males had a mean monthly wage of NIS 4,874 (a change of 8.3%) versus NIS 3,154 for females (a change of 48%). The mean income for the self-employed was 4,516. There were 174 people who received unemployment benefits and 2,474 people who received an income guarantee.

== Sports ==
Since December 2005, an interfaith basketball program, PeacePlayers International, has been operating in Israel. Samer Jassar, 2.06 meters (6 feet 9 inches), a resident of Jatt, was spotted as an upcoming talent by an NBA general manager, and is now at one of the top basketball prep schools in the United States.

== See also ==
- Arab localities in Israel
