= Jatt, Israel =

Arab local council in Haifa District, Israel

Jatt: גַ'ת; جت
- Local council
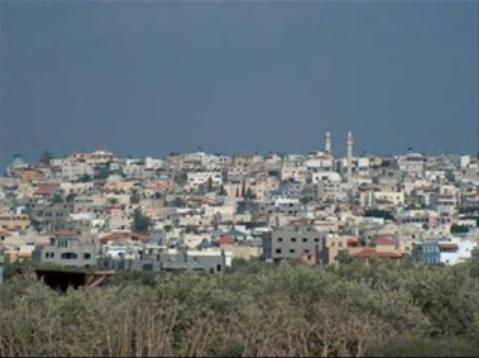

- Location within Haifa region of Israel Location within Israel
- Coordinates: 32°23′58″N 35°02′12″E
- Grid position: 153/200 PAL
- Country: Israel
- District: Haifa
- Subdistrict: Hadera
- Natural Region: Hadera

Population (2024)
  - Total: 12,834
- Name meaning: wine-press

Jatt (Arabic: جت; Hebrew: גַ'ת) is an Arab local council in the Triangle area of Haifa District in Israel. In 2024 it had a population of 12,834.

== Etymology ==
The name Jatt preserves the name Gath, Hebrew for winepress. The name Gath was used in ancient times to refer to various settlements from the Judean Lowlands in the south to the Galilee in the north. The name Gath is occasionally used in ancient sources along with a qualifier to set it apart from other locations with the same name, such as Gath of the Philistines, Gath-rimmon, Gat Carmel, Gat Hefer, and Gat Padla.

== History ==
Archaeologists excavations have yielded remains from Early Bronze Age and Middle Bronze Age. Both local and imported pottery from this period has been found. A scarab, in bone, dating to the 1750–1550 BCE has also been found. Archeological excavations have revealed major remains from the Byzantine and the Mamluk eras.

=== Roman Empire ===
Two ancient burial sites, dating from the Roman period, were discovered in a salvage excavation conducted at Jatt during the 1980s. One of them is a large funerary complex, holding inscriptions atop each of the kokhim, revealing names of Hebrew origin (such as Miriam, Rebeca, Sarah), names common to the Herodian dynasty (Berenice, Agrippa, Herodias), and names of Roman origin (Paulus, Marcus, Tiberius), with most of those dating from the late 1st century and early 2nd century CE. Based on the findings, excavators suggest the site was used by a wealthy Jewish family of the period, which may have had property in the toparchy of Narbata in the chore of Casesarea Maritima. The majority of the discoveries are from this period, but it appears that a Samaritan population used the site in the following centuries, at least up until the fifth century CE. Aryeh Kasher asserts that Jatt was a Jewish village during the 1st and 2nd centuries CE.

Two Roman lamps have also been found here.

=== Ottoman Empire ===
Jatt, like the rest of Palestine, was incorporated into the Ottoman Empire in 1517, and in the census of 1596, the village was located in the nahiya of Sara in the liwa of Lajjun. It had a population of 5 households, all Muslim. It paid a fixed tax of 25% on agricultural products, including wheat, barley, summer crops, goats and beehives, and occasional revenues; the taxes totalled 5,500 akçe.

In 1870, Victor Guérin noted here: "Several ancient cisterns are scattered about on the rocky plateau upon which stands Jett. The houses are rudely built. Amid the small materials, which are principally constructed, I observed a certain number of cut stones of ancient date. In the courtyard of one house I found an old capital of white marble hollowed to serve as a mortar, and now used to grind coffee. At the foot of the hill is a well, which probably is of ancient date." He further noted that Jatt had fourteen hundred inhabitants. In 1871 (1288 AH), an Ottoman census listed the village in the nahiya (sub-district) of al-Sha'rawiyya al-Gharbiyya.

In 1882, the Palestine Exploration Fund's Survey of Western Palestine described it: "Evidently an ancient site; a moderate-sized village of mud and stone on a high mound at the edge of the plain. It stands beside the main road to the north, near the junction from Shechem, and about 2 1/2 miles north of the road through Attil to the great plain. Wells surround the village and it has a few olives on the west. There are caves to the north and springs about a mile to the northwest.[..] It may also perhaps be the Jethu, or Gath, of Thothmes III, a place north of the road which he pursued to Megiddo."

=== British Mandate ===
In the 1922 census of Palestine conducted by the British Mandate authorities, Jatt had a population of 680 Muslims, increasing in the 1931 census to 780 Muslim, living in 165 houses. In the 1945 statistics the population of Jatt was 1,120 Muslims, with a total of 9,631 dunams of land according to an official land and population survey. 1,233 dunams were plantations and irrigable land, 8,228 used for cereals, while 31 dunams were built-up (urban) land.

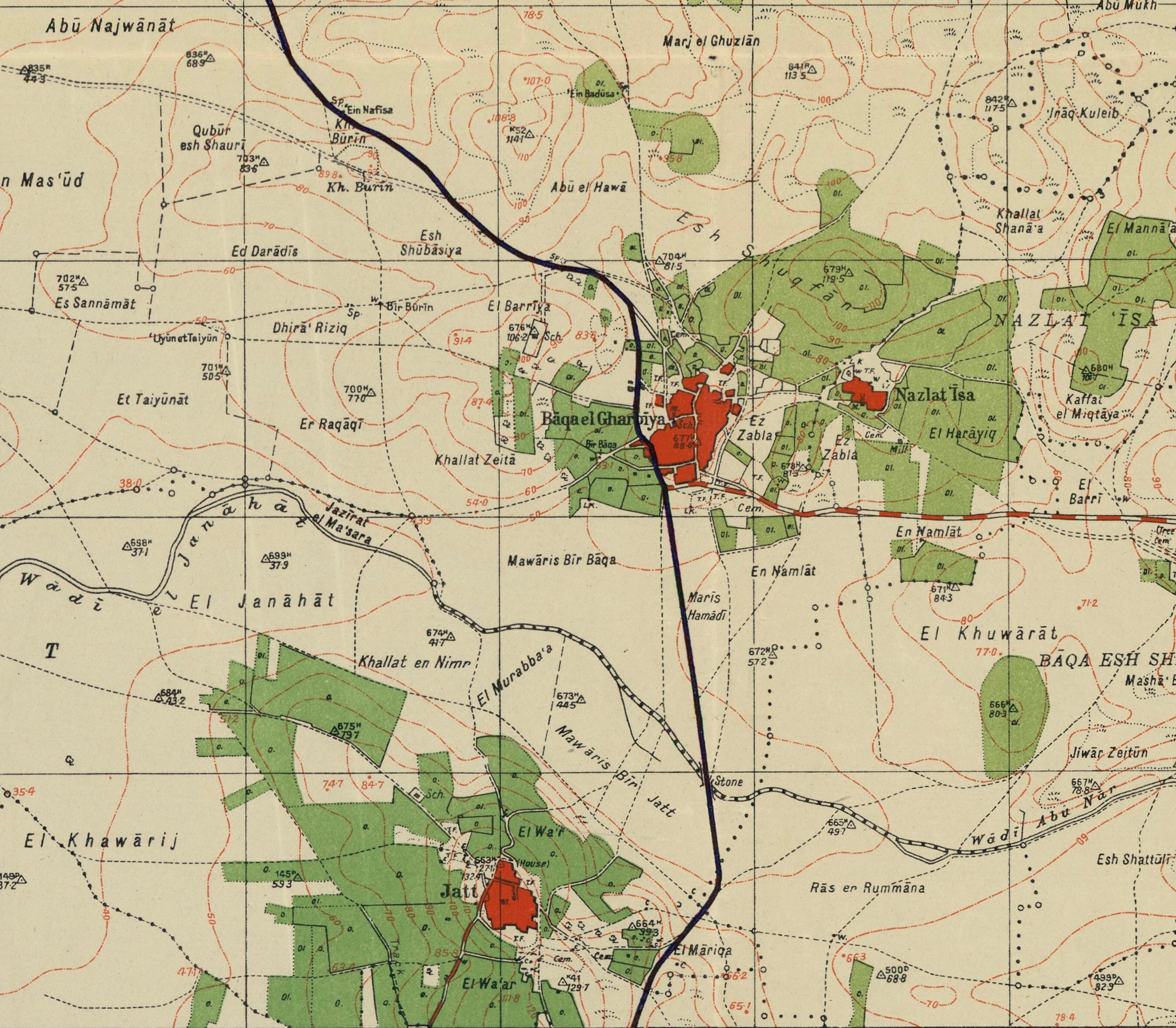
Jatt 1942 1:20,000

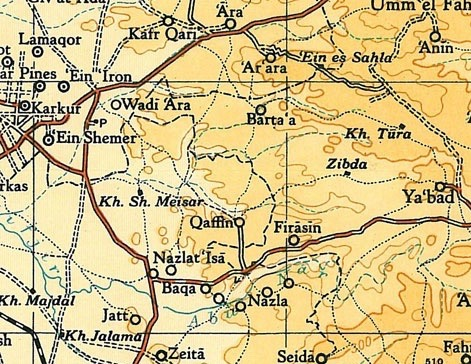
Jatt 1945 1:250,000

=== Israel ===
Prayer of during Eid al-Adha in Jatt, 2013

In 1959 the town was declared a local council. Direct elections were held for the mayoralty for the first time in the 1960s, with Ali Abdul-Razzaq Malak, succeeded by Sharif Jameel Gara. Then in 1973, Ahmed Mahmoud Abu Asba was elected and re-elected for a second term in 1983. Galal Abd al-Kader Wattad won the 1988 elections, and Ahmed Mahmoud Abu Asba returned to the mayoralty in 1993. Mohammad Hassan Abu Foul won the 1998 elections.

In 2003 Jatt was merged with nearby Baqa al-Gharbiyye to form the city of Baqa-Jatt. The merger was reversed in 2010. Following the local council's re-establishment in 2010, Khaled Gharra was elected mayor. Khaled Gharra was succeeded by Muhammad Taher Wattad and was reelected in 2019.

== Voting Patterns ==
In the 2022 election, 97 percent of voters in Jatt voted for the Arab parties, while 2 percent voted for the parties of the center-left coalition led by Yair Lapid and 1 percent voted for the parties of the right-wing coalition led by Benjamin Netanyahu. Among the voters for the Arab parties, 47 percent voted for Balad, while 27 percent voted for Ra'am and 26 percent voted for the Hadash–Ta'al list.

In the 2026 election, 97 percent of voters in Jatt voted for the Arab parties, while 2 percent voted for the parties of the center-left coalition led by Gadi Eisenkot and 0.3 percent voted for the parties of the right-wing coalition led by Benjamin Netanyahu. Among the voters for the Arab parties, 66 percent voted for the Joint List, while 34 percent voted for Ra'am. Voter turnout more than doubled compared with the 2022 election.

== Notable people ==
- Muhammed Wattad, Knesset member and writer
- Somaya Bashir, social and political activist and music therapist

== Bibliography ==
- Abu Hamid, Amani (September 12, 2010). "Jatt Final Report". Hadashot Arkheologiyot – Excavations and Surveys in Israel. 122.
- ‘Awawdy, Eiad (June 14, 2007). "Tell Jatt Final Report". Hadashot Arkheologiyot – Excavations and Surveys in Israel. 119.
- Barron, J.B., ed. (1923). Palestine: Report and General Abstracts of the Census of 1922. Government of Palestine.
- Conder, C.R. (1881). "Jatt". Quarterly Statement - Palestine Exploration Fund. 13: 196–197.
- Conder, C.R.; Kitchener, H.H. (1882). The Survey of Western Palestine: Memoirs of the Topography, Orography, Hydrography, and Archaeology. Vol. 2. London: Committee of the Palestine Exploration Fund.
- Conder, C.R.; Kitchener, H.H. (1883). The Survey of Western Palestine: Memoirs of the Topography, Orography, Hydrography, and Archaeology. Vol. 3. London: Committee of the Palestine Exploration Fund.
- Dauphin, C. (1998). La Palestine byzantine, Peuplement et Populations. BAR International Series 726 (in French). Vol. III : Catalogue. Oxford: Archeopress. ISBN 0-860549-05-4.
- Department of Statistics (1945). Village Statistics, April, 1945. Government of Palestine.
- Guérin, V. (1875). Description Géographique Historique et Archéologique de la Palestine (in French). Vol. 2: Samarie, pt. 2. Paris: L'Imprimerie Nationale.
- Hadawi, S. (1970). Village Statistics of 1945: A Classification of Land and Area ownership in Palestine. Palestine Liberation Organization Research Center.
- Hütteroth, W.-D.; Abdulfattah, K. (1977). Historical Geography of Palestine, Transjordan and Southern Syria in the Late 16th Century. Erlanger Geographische Arbeiten, Sonderband 5. Erlangen, Germany: Vorstand der Fränkischen Geographischen Gesellschaft. ISBN 3-920405-41-2.
- Masarwa, Marwan (May 31, 2004). "Jatt Final Report". Hadashot Arkheologiyot – Excavations and Surveys in Israel. 116.
- Massarwa, Abdallah (November 4, 2010). "Jatt Final Report". Hadashot Arkheologiyot – Excavations and Surveys in Israel. 122.
- Massarwa, Abdallah (July 22, 2012). "Jatt Final Report". Hadashot Arkheologiyot – Excavations and Surveys in Israel. 124.
- Mills, E., ed. (1932). Census of Palestine 1931. Population of Villages, Towns and Administrative Areas. Jerusalem: Government of Palestine.
- Palmer, E.H. (1881). The Survey of Western Palestine: Arabic and English Name Lists Collected During the Survey by Lieutenants Conder and Kitchener, R. E. Transliterated and Explained by E.H. Palmer. Committee of the Palestine Exploration Fund.
- Sa'id, Kareem (May 31, 2004). "Jatt Final Report". Hadashot Arkheologiyot – Excavations and Surveys in Israel. 116.
- Sa'id, Kareem (October 2, 2005). "Tell Jatt Final Report". Hadashot Arkheologiyot – Excavations and Surveys in Israel. 117.
- Sa'id, Kareem (June 25, 2006). "Jatt Final Report". Hadashot Arkheologiyot – Excavations and Surveys in Israel. 118.
