= Baqa al-Gharbiyye =

Arab town in Haifa District, Israel

Baqa al-Gharbiyye: בָּקַה אל-גרְבִּיָּה; باقة الغربية
- City (from 1264)

Hebrew transcription(s)
  - Also spelled: Baqa al-Gharbiya (unofficial)
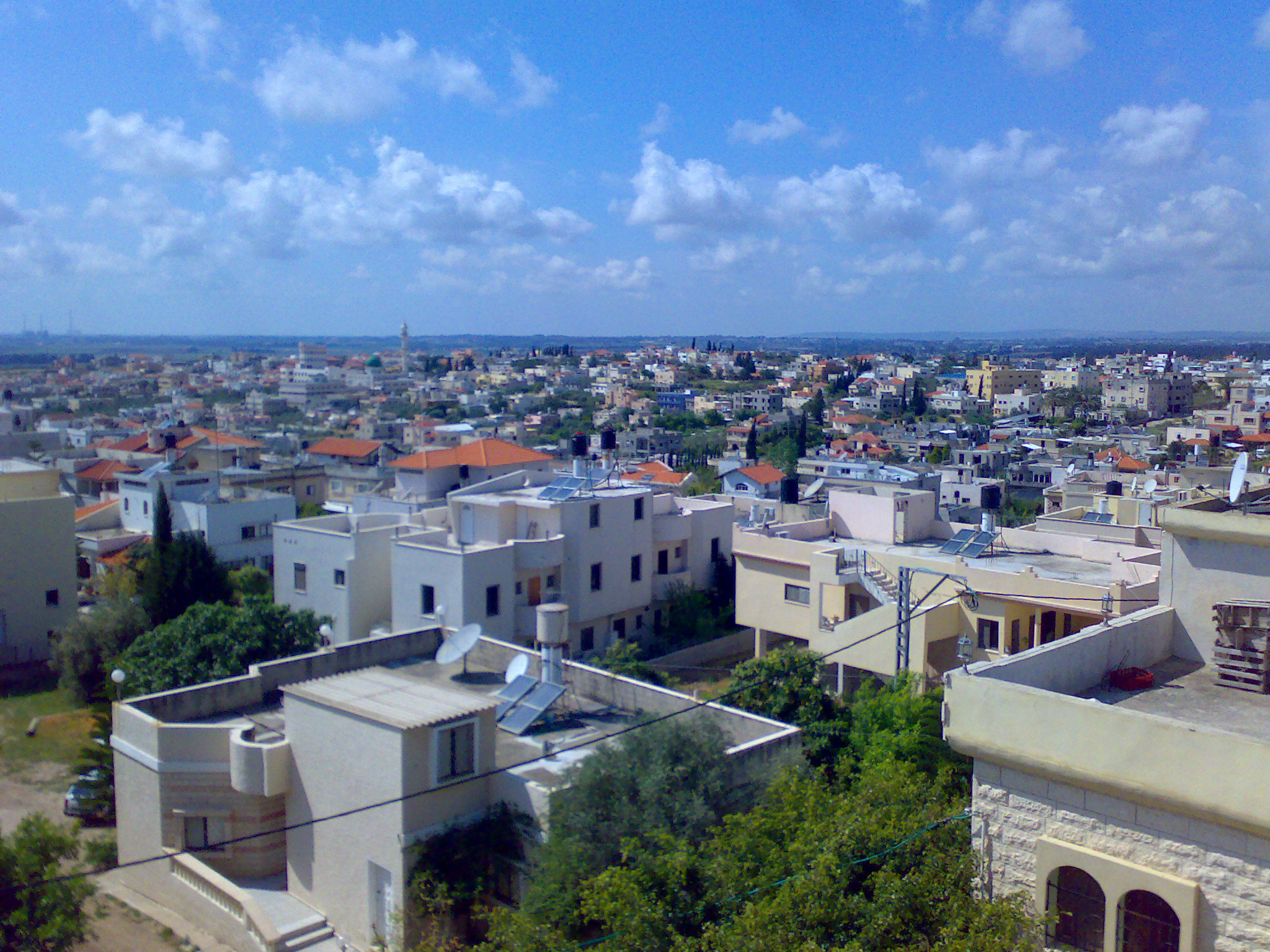

- Emblem of Baqa al-Gharbiyye

- Location within Haifa region of Israel Location within Israel
- Coordinates: 32°25′13″N 35°02′32″E
- Grid position: 154/202 PAL
- Country: Israel
- District: Haifa
- Subdistrict: Hadera
- Natural Region: Hadera

Government
  - Mayor: Raed Daqa

Area
  - Total: 9,100 dunams (9.1 km^{2}; 3.5 sq mi)

Population (2024)
  - Total: 31,275
  - Density: 3,400/km^{2} (8,900/sq mi)
- Name meaning: The western bouquet (of flowers) or "The western Baka"

Baqa al-Gharbiyye (Arabic: باقة الغربية, Hebrew: באקה אל-גרביה, בָּקַה אל-עַ'רְבִּיָּה; lit. Western Baqa) is a predominantly Arab city in the "Triangle" region of Israel near the Green Line. In 2003, Baqa al-Gharbiyye united with the Jatt local council to form Baqa-Jatt, a unification that was dissolved a few years later. The city had a population of 31,275 in 2024.

== History ==
Pottery remains from the Intermediate Bronze Age, Iron Age II and Hellenistic era have been found here. An olive press, quarries and a winepress believed to date to the Hellenistic or Early Roman period have been found. Ceramic objects from the late Roman or early Byzantine periods have also been found, and a burial cave, with remains dating to Byzantine and the beginning of the Umayyad periods (sixth–seventh centuries CE).

=== Middle Ages ===
In 1265 Sultan Baibars divided the village between the emirs 'Ala' al-Din Taibars al-Zahiri and Ala' al-Din 'Ali al-Tunkuzi when the villages of Palestine were divided up between those who fought against the Crusaders.

=== Ottoman Empire ===
In 1517 the village was incorporated into the Ottoman Empire with the rest of Palestine. During the 16th and 17th centuries, Baqa belonged to the Turabay Emirate (1517-1683), which encompassed also the Jezreel Valley, Haifa, Jenin, Beit She'an Valley, northern Jabal Nablus, Bilad al-Ruha/Ramot Menashe, and the northern part of the Sharon plain. Baqa was mentioned in an Ottoman document in 1538, as a five-family small village with 11 non-married people. In 1596, Baqa al-Gharbiyye appeared in Ottoman tax registers as being in the Nahiya of Jabal Shami, part of the Sanjak of Nablus. It had a population of 5 Muslim households who paid a fixed tax rate of 33.3% on wheat, barley, summer crops, goats or beehives, and a press for olives or grapes; a total of 12,000 akçe. Half of the revenue went to the waqf of al-Haramayn as-Sarifayn.

In 1838 it was noted as a village, Bakah, the west, in the western Esh-Sha'rawiyeh administrative region, north of Nablus.

In 1870, the French explorer Victor Guérin described the village as built on a low hill with wells and cisterns that looked ancient. He estimated the population to be 1500. In 1871 (1288 AH), an Ottoman census listed the village in the nahiya (sub-district) of al-Sha'rawiyya al-Sharqiyya.

In 1882 the Palestine Exploration Fund's Survey of Western Palestine described Baqa al-Gharbiyye as a village of moderate size that stood out in the landscape with a few olive trees and orchards to the south.

=== British Mandate ===
In the 1922 census of Palestine conducted by the British Mandate authorities, Baqa Gharbiyeh had a population of 1,443; 1442 Muslim and one Anglican Christian. In the 1931 census of Palestine, Baqa was recorded as having a population of 1,640 Muslims living in 403 houses. These numbers included the nearby smaller locality El Manshiya. During the 1936–1939 Arab revolt in Palestine the village was under strict British martial law and collective punishment was imposed on villages where militants were found.

On 25 August 1938 a clash took place in Baka in which British officers were killed and three villagers were wounded. The next day, the British ordered the inhabitants to leave, taking nothing with them. Most of the homes destroyed. The villagers were forced to walk to the Nur al-Shams Camp near Tulkarm. The next day the villagers returned to find the village in ruins. This was one of the largest British attacks on a Palestinian village during the revolt. Members of the older generation say men, women and children threw stones and rocks at the camp to free those who were arrested.

In the 1945 statistics the population of Baqa al-Gharbiyye (including Manshiyat Baqa) consisted of 2,240 Muslims with a total land area of 21,116 dunams, according to an official land and population survey. Of this, 861 dunams were designated for plantations and irrigable land, 18,986 for cereals, while 76 dunams were built-up (urban) areas.

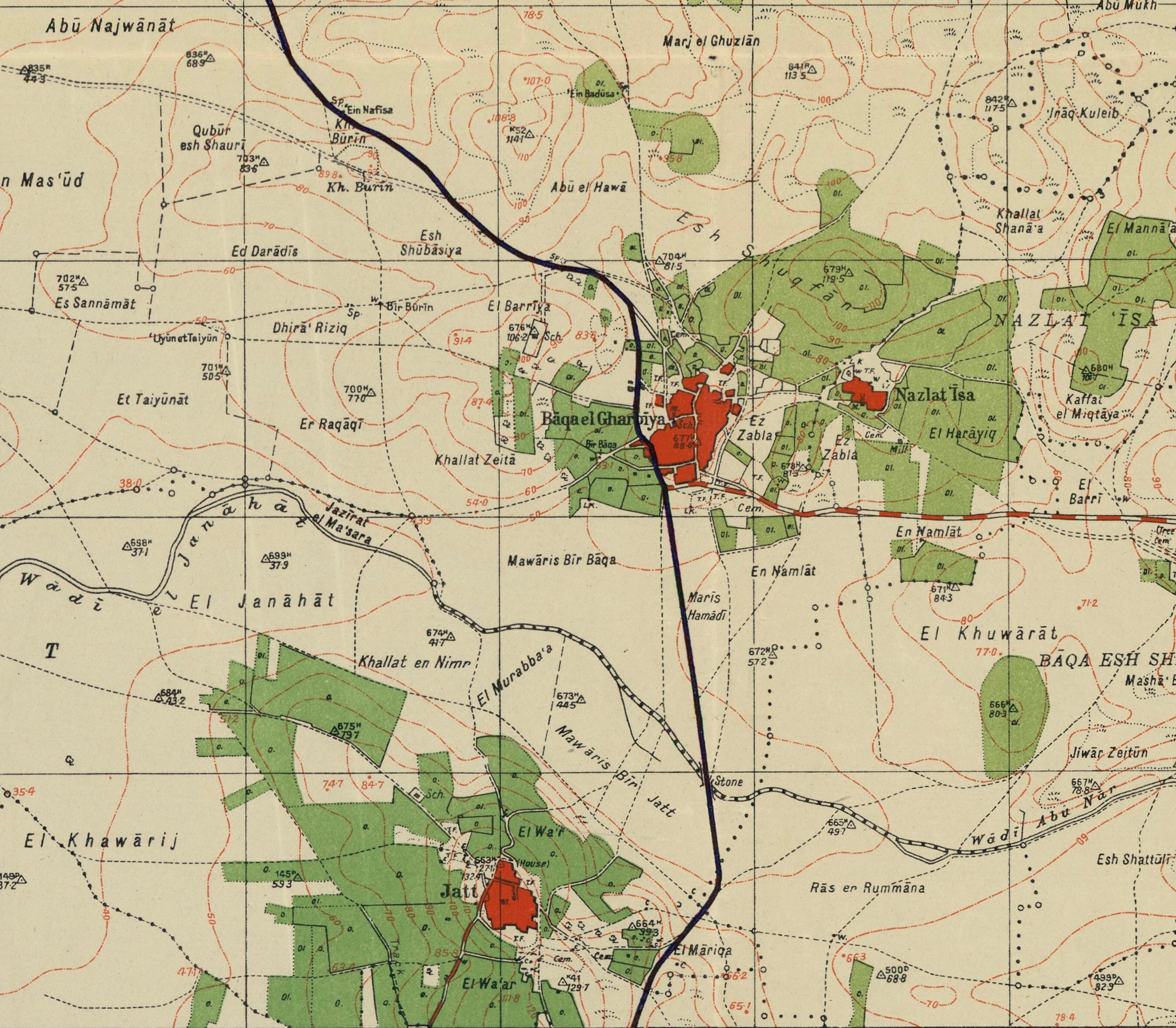
Baqa al-Gharbiyye 1942 1:20,000

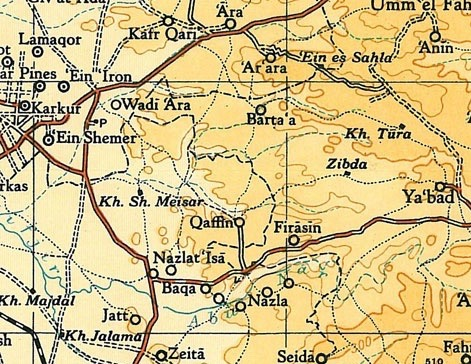
Baqa al-Gharbiyye 1945 1:250,000

=== Israel ===
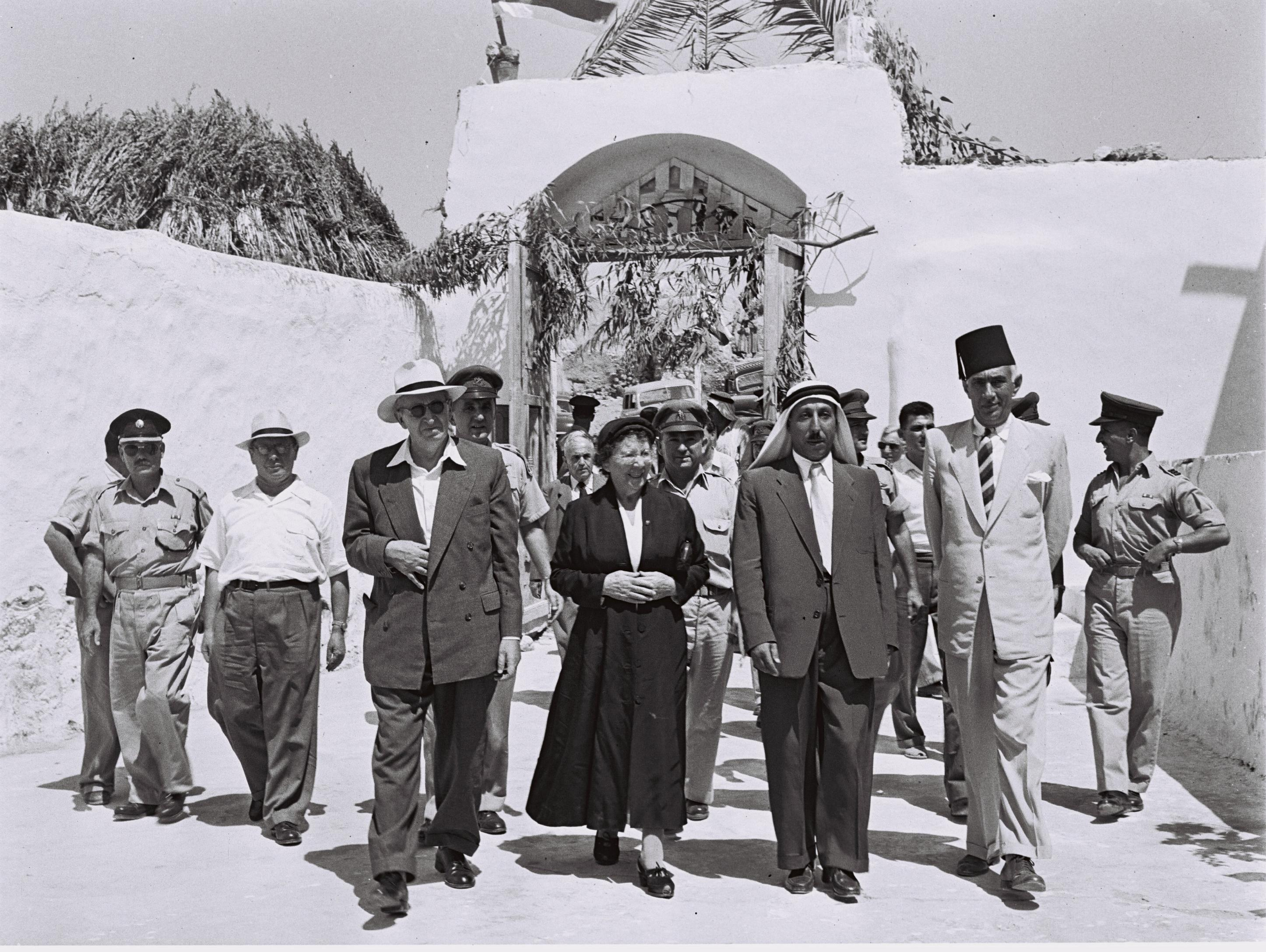
Israeli President Yitzhak Ben Zvi visiting MK Fares Hamdan in Baka El-Garbiyya, September 1956

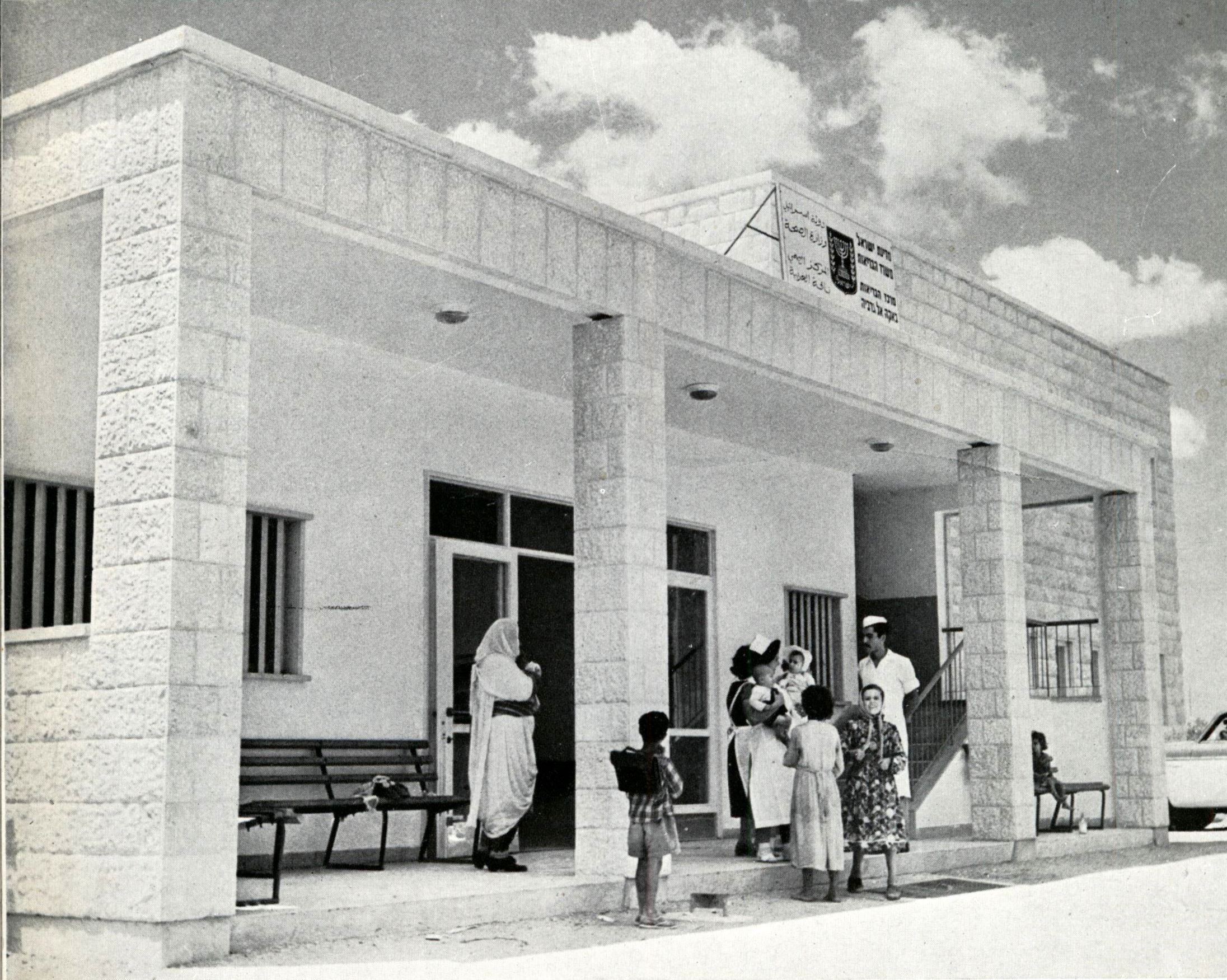
Baqa al-Gharbiyya health clinic, 1950s

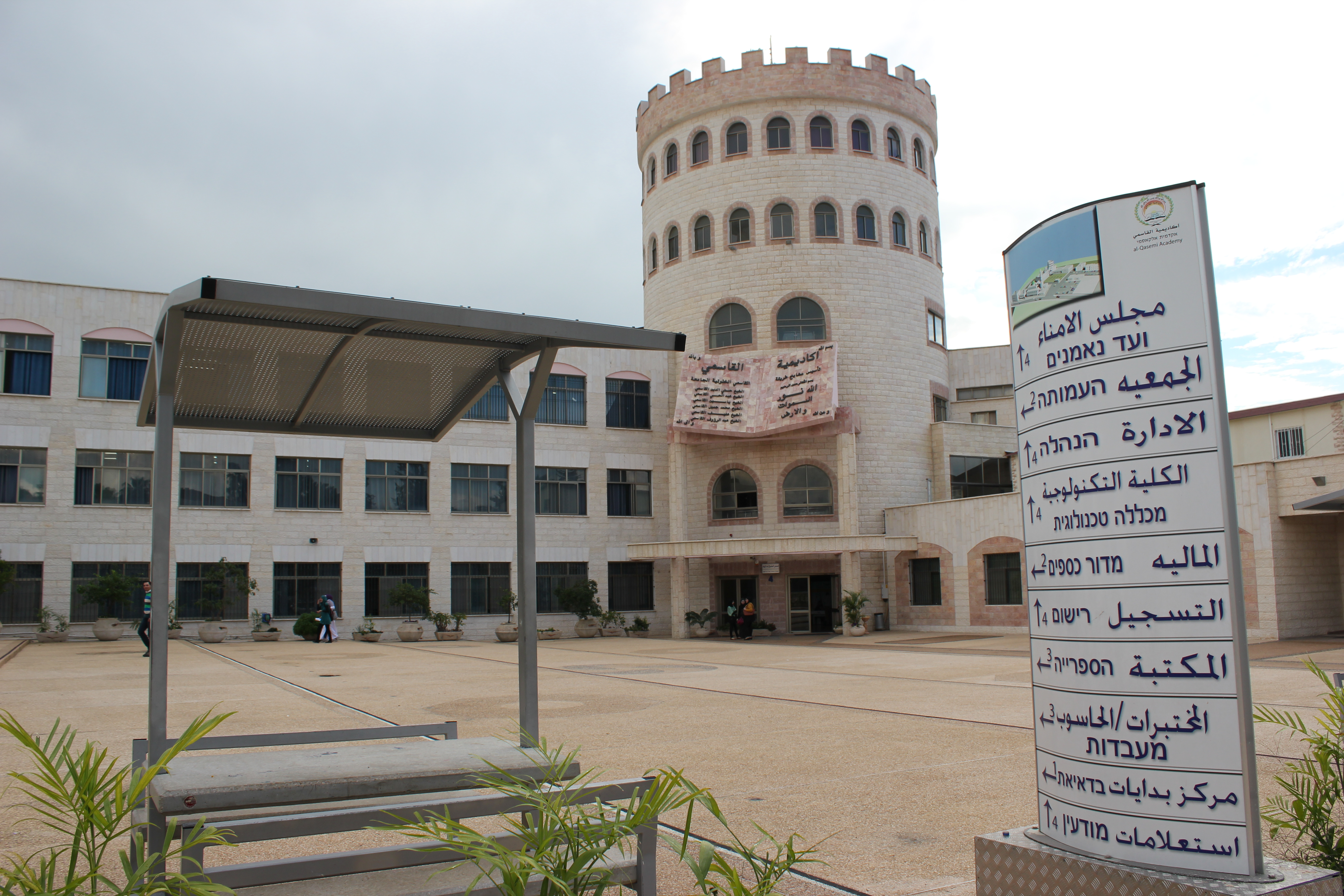
Al-Qasemi Academic College of Education

In the early years of Israeli independence, Baqa al-Gharbiyye was one of the headquarters of the Israeli military administration. The land holdings of the town, which had been 21,116 dunams in 1945, were reduced to 8,228 dunams by 1962, mostly due to expropriation in 1953–1954. In 1963, the Baka canning plant went into partnership with Priman, an Israeli company that relocated to Baqa al-Gharibiyye.

In 1996, Baqa al-Gharbiyye was declared a city. In 2003 it was merged with the nearby town Jatt, becoming Baqa-Jatt. The merger was dissolved on 1 November 2010.

Baqa al-Gharbiyye is separated from its West Bank sister city, Baqa ash-Sharqiyya (or Baqa East), by the Israeli West Bank barrier which in this section coincides with the Green Line. As a result, a concrete wall topped with barbed wire runs through one neighbourhood.

As the Israeli foreign minister in April and June 2008, Tzipi Livni raised the possibility of territorial exchange with Palestinian Authority President Mahmoud Abbas. She proposed transferring Israeli Arab communities, among them Baqa al-Gharbiyeh, to the Palestinian side of the border. The Palestinians rejected the proposal.

== Demographics ==
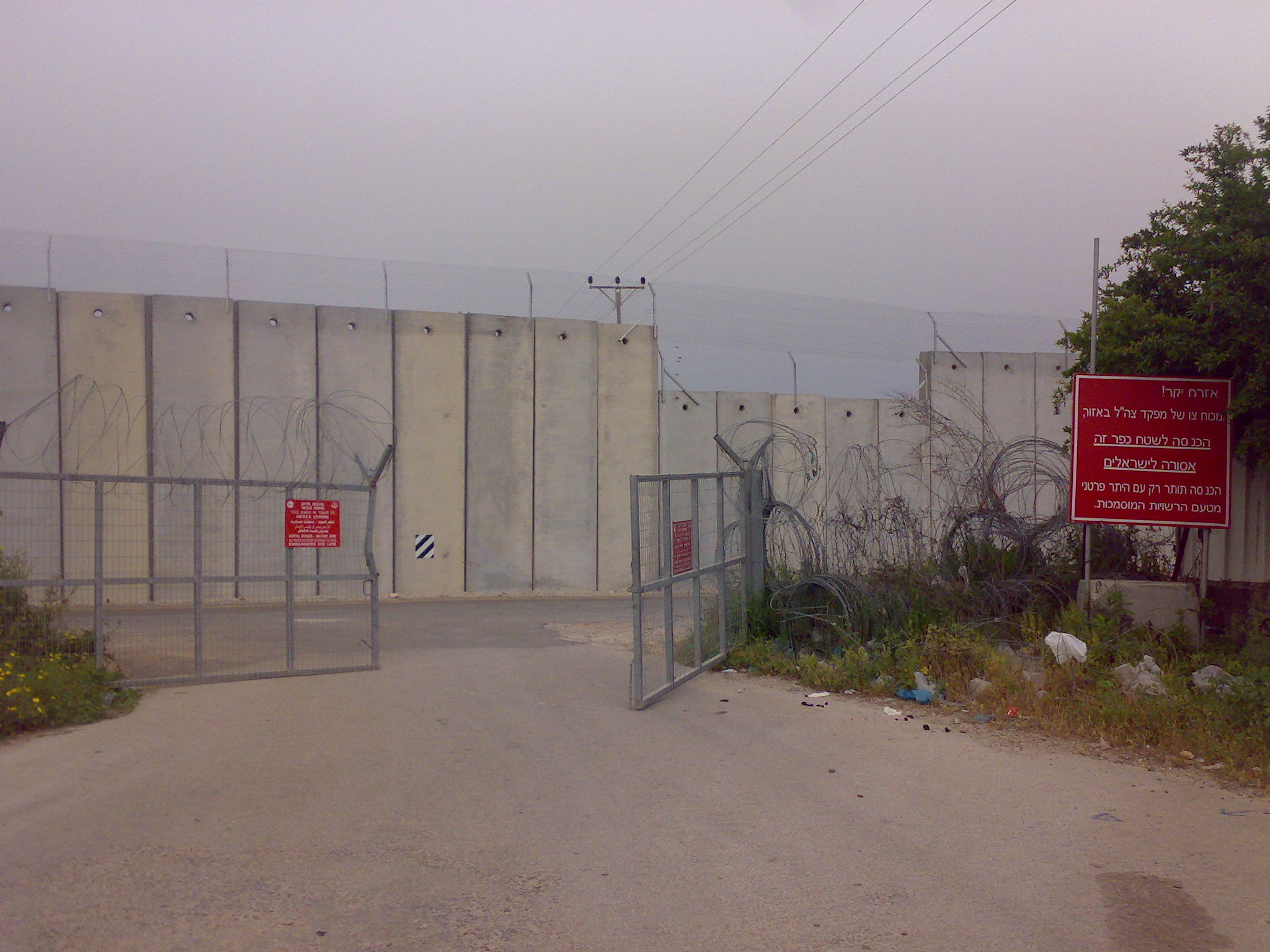
Separation barrier passing through eastern Baqa al-Gharbiyye

In 2019, the official population was 29.000. Together with Jatt (11,000) the estimated population is 40,000. The ethnic makeup of the city is entirely Muslim Arab Palestinian. The city is made up of 51% males and 49% females. Baqa has a population growth rate of 3.1%. The population of the city is spread out, with 48.6% 19 years of age or younger, 18.4% between 20 and 29, 18.9% between 30 and 44, 9.5% from 45 to 59, 1.8% from 60 to 64, and 2.8% 65 years of age or older.

Baqa al-Gharbiyye was settled in the 18th century by migrants from Allar amid conflicts with Jit settlers. Today, its residents have diverse backgrounds, including families with roots tracing back to Egypt and Persia.

== Education and culture ==
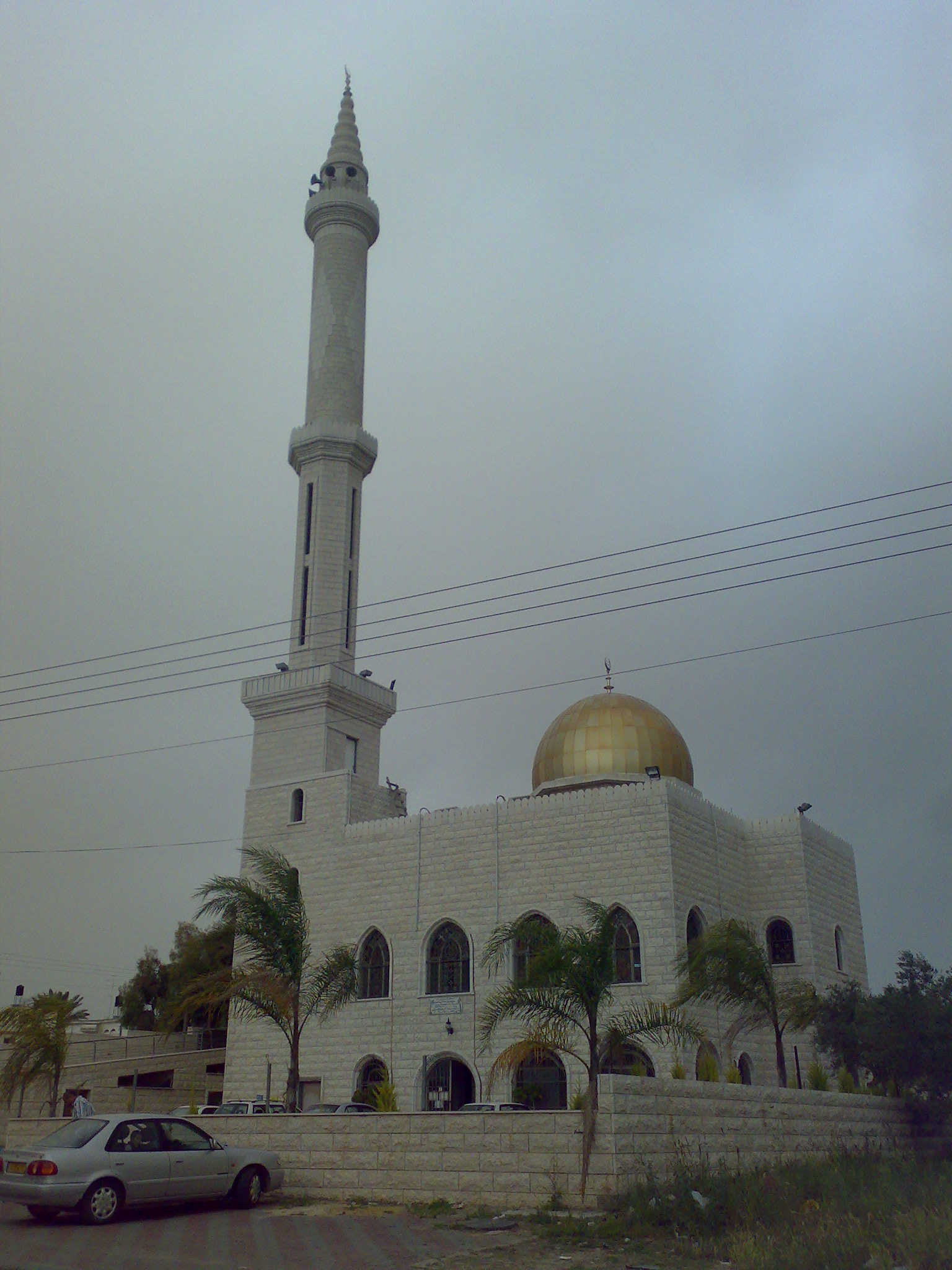
Alserat Mosque

According to CBS, 47.8% of 12th grade students were entitled to a matriculation certificate in 2001. There are 6 elementary school, two junior-high schools and two high school, in addition to a private school. In addition to the official education institutions, Baqa has a wide range of private educational institutions which provide services to the city residents as well as people from the whole region. In addition, the Al-Rahma School (مدرسة الرحمة) in the city provides special education for the city and the surrounding towns and villages.

The Al-Qasemi Academic College of Education is open to students from around the country, and has a combined Arab and Jewish faculty. The college is part of the Al-Qasemi group which aims to establish high-standard education through private schools, a library and centers for extra-curricular education.

== Economy ==
Baqa al-Gharbiyye is considered a commercial and industrial center for nearby towns, villages and kibbutzim. There are over 400 workshops in Baqa. Industrial zones make up 8.5% of city's area.

== Environment ==
In 2007, the mayors of Baqa al-Gharbiyya and Baqa ash-Sharqiyya signed an agreement to clean up Wadi Abu Nar, a polluted stream that runs through both villages. The mayors also committed to protecting the mountain aquifer, the most important underground water source for Israelis and Palestinians, by establishing an authorized sewage grid-system. Baqa al-Gharbiyya agreed to connect the town's sewage treatment plant with a waste disposal network in Baqa al Sharkiya.

== Voting patterns ==
In the 2022 election, 96 percent of voters in Baqa al-Gharbiyye voted for the Arab parties, while 3 percent voted for the parties of the center-left coalition led by Yair Lapid and 1 percent voted for the parties of the right-wing coalition led by Benjamin Netanyahu. Among the voters for the Arab parties, 53 percent voted for Balad, while 24 percent voted for Ra'am and 23 percent voted for the Hadash–Ta'al list.

In the 2026 election, 98 percent of voters in Baqa al-Gharbiyye voted for the Arab parties, while 1 percent voted for the parties of the center-left coalition led by Gadi Eisenkot and 0.2 percent voted for the parties of the right-wing coalition led by Benjamin Netanyahu. Among the voters for the Arab parties, 74 percent voted for the Joint List, while 26 percent voted for Ra'am. Voter turnout increased 86 percent from the 2022 election.

== Notable people ==
- Walid Daqqa
- Faras Hamdan
- Aya Maasarwe
- Raleb Majadele
- Khaled Abu Toameh
- Sayed Abu Farchi

== Bibliography ==
- Barron, J.B., ed. (1923). Palestine: Report and General Abstracts of the Census of 1922. Government of Palestine.
- Conder, C.R.; Kitchener, H.H. (1882). The Survey of Western Palestine: Memoirs of the Topography, Orography, Hydrography, and Archaeology. Vol. 2. London: Committee of the Palestine Exploration Fund.
- Dauphin, C. (1998). La Palestine Byzantine, Peuplement et Populations. BAR International Series 726 (in French). Vol. III : Catalogue. Oxford: Archeopress. ISBN 0-860549-05-4.
- Government of Palestine, Department of Statistics (1945). Village Statistics, April, 1945.
- Guérin, V. (1875). Description Géographique Historique et Archéologique de la Palestine (in French). Vol. 2: Samarie, pt. 2. Paris: L'Imprimerie Nationale.
- Hadawi, S. (1970). Village Statistics of 1945: A Classification of Land and Area ownership in Palestine. Palestine Liberation Organization Research Center.
- Hütteroth, W.-D.; Abdulfattah, K. (1977). Historical Geography of Palestine, Transjordan and Southern Syria in the Late 16th Century. Erlanger Geographische Arbeiten, Sonderband 5. Erlangen, Germany: Vorstand der Fränkischen Geographischen Gesellschaft. ISBN 3-920405-41-2.
- Ibn al-Furat (1971). J. Riley-Smith (ed.). Ayyubids, Mamluks and Crusaders: Selections from the "Tarikh Al-duwal Wal-muluk" of Ibn Al-Furat : the Text, the Translation. Vol. 2. Translation by Malcolm Cameron Lyons, Ursula Lyons. Cambridge: W. Heffer.
- Jiryis, S. (1976). The Arabs in Israel. With a foreword by Noam Chomsky. Monthly Review Press. ISBN 9780853453772.
- Karmon, Y. (1960). "An Analysis of Jacotin's Map of Palestine" (PDF). Israel Exploration Journal. 10 (3, 4): 155–173, 244–253. Archived from the original (PDF) on 5 September 2018.
- Mahajna, Shireen (16 October 2007). "Baqa al-Gharbiya (East)". Hadashot Arkheologiyot – Excavations and Surveys in Israel (119).
- Mills, E., ed. (1932). Census of Palestine 1931. Population of Villages, Towns and Administrative Areas. Jerusalem: Government of Palestine.
- Palmer, E.H. (1881). The Survey of Western Palestine: Arabic and English Name Lists Collected During the Survey by Lieutenants Conder and Kitchener, R. E. Transliterated and Explained by E.H. Palmer. Committee of the Palestine Exploration Fund.
- Robinson, E.; Smith, E. (1841). Biblical Researches in Palestine, Mount Sinai and Arabia Petraea: A Journal of Travels in the year 1838. Vol. 3. Boston: Crocker & Brewster.
- Sharvit, Jacob (16 February 2009). "Baqa al-Gharbiya". Hadashot Arkheologiyot – Excavations and Surveys in Israel (121).
- Zertal, A. (2016). The Manasseh Hill Country Survey: From Nahal 'Iron to Nahal Shechem. Vol. 3. Brill. ISBN 978-9004312302.
