= Gangs in Australia =

The history of gangs in Australia goes back to the colonial era. Criminal gangs flourished in The Rocks district of Sydney in its early history in the 19th century. The Rocks Push was a notorious larrikin gang which dominated the area from the 1800s to the end of the 1900s. The gang was engaged in running warfare with other larrikin gangs of the time such as the Straw Hat Push, the Glebe Push, the Argyle Cut Push, the Forty Thieves from Surry Hills, and the Gibb Street Mob.

In the 20th century Italian crime gangs were active in Melbourne and Sydney, and youth gangs like Rockers and the Sharpies in the 1960s and 1970s have been large enough to cause disturbances, though lacking criminal organisation.

So-called "outlaw" bikie gangs have had a very visible presence in many places throughout Australia since the 1950s, and several laws have been specifically prompted by their actions.

== List of main gang types ==
=== Outlaw motorcycle gangs ===
According to the Australian Crime Commission, Australia is home to 35 outlaw motorcycle gangs, with a combined membership of around 3,500 "patched" bikies. Outlaw motorcycle gangs present in Australia include international outlaw clubs, like the Bandidos, the Hells Angels and the Gypsy Jokers, as well as homegrown groups, such as the Comancheros, the Finks and the Rebels. The Bandidos, the Comancheros, the Hells Angels, the Finks, the Mongols, and the Rebels are considered the "big six" bikie gangs in Australia.

The outlaw bikie scene in Australia is unique in the sense that it avoided to a certain extent the consolidation that occurred elsewhere. In the United States, the four major biker gangs are the Hells Angels, the Outlaws, the Bandidos and Pagans. Elsewhere, the major biker gangs are the local branches of American gangs. The Hells Angels dominate Canada while Europe is divided primarily between the Hells Angels and the Bandidos. The Canadian journalists William Marsden and Julian Sher wrote: "Unlike in Europe or North America, neither the Hells Angels nor the Bandidos succeeded in entirely vanquishing the fiercely independent Australian bikie gangs". In 2006, Sher and Marsden wrote: "The Hells Angels remain the most powerful bikie gang in the country, even though they have fewer members than other gangs such as the Rebels or the Gyspy Jokers.". The Australian Hells Angels benefit from their connections with Hells Angels chapters in the United States, the United Kingdom and Canada. The Port of Vancouver is controlled by the Canadian Hells Angels, who use the port as a conduit for drug smuggling both into and out of Canada. The port of Vancouver is used to smuggle cocaine, methamphetamine, and heroin into Canada while also being used to smuggle cocaine and methamphetamine into Australia, New Zealand, and Southeast Asia where the price of drugs is much higher than in North America.

One of the major events in Australian motorcycle gang criminal history was what became known as the Milperra Massacre in 1984, where a fight between two gangs, the Comancheros and the Bandidos in Milperra in the South of Sydney, turned into a gun battle that claimed seven lives - six gang members and an uninvolved bystander. This was from a split within the Comancheros that was controlled by the Australian Scotsman Jock Ross, the founder of the Comancheros. Through opposing views club members split eventually burning their patches and opening up the first Australian chapter of the Bandidos. While conflict between various clubs has been ever present, in 2008 the gang conflict escalated, with 13 shootings taking place in Sydney in the space of two weeks. Despite the shock caused by the Milperra Massacre, bikie gangs increased in number after 1984 due to the profits offered by selling methamphetamine.

Gang violence has become high-profile to the point where various state governments have taken steps to change laws to focus on the problem, and police have set up groups to deal with the threat, including the Crime Gang Task Force in South Australia Bikie gangs in South Australia at least, are involved in drugs, murder, extortion and other forms of intimidation and violence. Bikie gangs in South Australia have diversified their activities into both legal and illegal commercial business enterprises. The South Australian police estimate that 80% of nightclubs and bars in Adelaide use security companies owned by bikie gangs and whose staff are gang members.

In early 1994, representatives of six major gangs, the Hells Angels, the Outlaws, the Bandidos, the Rebels, the Black Uhlans and the Nomads, attended a gang summit in Sydney and informally decided to align under a decree known as the "Australia 2000 Pact". The pact insisted that criminal activities in Australia would be controlled by the six core gangs by the year 2000. A consolidation began in 1994 as the larger clubs eliminated the smaller clubs, which caused 35 murders between 1994-2000. The number of clubs was reduced down from 178 in 1994 to 32 in 2000. Bikie violence between the various gangs had begun to escalate again by the late 1990s. One major gang which was excluded from the pact, the Comancheros, developed into a considerable presence in the Australian bikie scene in the following decade.

The Hancock case, which saw a former policeman, Don Hancock, murdered in a case widely blamed on the Gypsy Jokers generated much tougher anti-bikie laws in Western Australia, giving the police to power to seize clubhouses and other gang property. In May 2004, the police broke up a joint drug venture involving the Hells Angels, the Gypsy Jokers, the Finks, the Nomads and the Rebels. The police seized drugs worth $23 million Australian dollars. On 3 September 2004, the Coffin Cheaters of Perth established their first chapter outside of Australia in Norway. The fact that the Norwegian Coffin Cheaters were working closely with a Hells Angels puppet gang, the Wizards, suggested that the Coffin Cheaters had the approval of the Hells Angels to operate in Norway, which has a number of secret ecstasy labs.

In Western Australia they are involved in the drug trade. In June 2001, the Western Australia Police Force seized the home of Leslie "Lee" Hoddy, the national president of the Gypsy Jokers, as the proceeds of crime. An enraged Hoddy shouted at the policemen locking him out of his house "I know where you fuckers all live!", which led to him being charged with making death threats. Hoddy who had once been a millionaire died a poor man in 2004 as the Crown had seized his assets, property and bank accounts. Laws to deal with Bikie gangs (applying to any association, bike or otherwise) have been introduced into Northern Territory, South Australia, and are presently being looked at in NSW and Queensland.

In early 2009, the Comanchero and the Hells Angels were involved in a clash at Sydney Airport. One Hell's Angels associate member was beaten to death in plain view of witnesses at the airport, and police estimated as many as 15 men were involved in the violence. Police documents detail the brawl as a result of the Comanchero and Hells Angels Presidents being on the same flight from Melbourne. Four suspects were arrested as a result of the altercation. The head of the Comancheros was initially sentenced to 21 years jail for the murder after a nine-month trial, but in May 2014 he was granted a retrial. Four years later on 14 February 2018, the Comanchero ex-boss was gunned down outside the front of a gym in Sydney in a possible retaliation attack.

Including two murders in the capital city, four people were killed in the space of a week in Canberra and in Sydney. As a result of heightening violence, New South Wales Premier Nathan Ree.

A growing percentage of the crime attributed to outlaw motorcycle gangs since around 2010 has not been committed by known bikie members. Much of the crime has been committed by non-riding members or associates of these gangs, meaning that core members of the gangs can be more easily protected from the more aggressive police tactics and the tougher laws. Australia's bikie gangs continue to increase their campaign to completely corner the illicit drug trade in every state and territory.

In 2010, Derek Wainohu of the Hells Angels Motorcycle Club successfully obtained a declaration from the High Court that the Crimes (Criminal Organisations Control) Act 2009 (NSW), which empowered the Supreme Court to make control orders against individual members of organisations and prevented them from associating with one another, was invalid. The High Court held, by majority, that the Act was invalid on the basis that s 13(2) placed no obligation on the eligible judge making the control order to provide reasons when making a declaration of a control order. As such, the section contravened the institutional integrity of the Supreme Court. On construction, it was held that the validity of the whole Act relied on the validity of Part 2, which contained s 13(2), and therefore the whole Act was held invalid. The state of New South Wales was ordered to pay Wainohu's costs.

In 2013, Queensland enacted Criminal Law (Criminal Organisations Disruption) Amendment Act 2013 to criminalise outlaw motorcycle gangs.

=== Examples ===
Motorcycle gangs in Australia include:

- Bandidos - One of the "Big Four" American gangs identified by authorities. They have 45 chapters across Australia and between 250 and 400 members. One of the clubs that has actively recruited from ethnic groups in recent years.
- Coffin Cheaters - They have chapters in Western Australia, Victoria, New South Wales and Queensland, as well as in Norway. They have between 200 and 300 members.
- Comanchero - One of the oldest outlaw clubs in Australia founded by Jock Ross during the late 60s early 70s. Its headquarters are in Western Sydney. It has chapters in Western Australia, Victoria, Queensland, Northern Territory and South Australia. They have between 350 and 400 members in Australia and have expanded in Spain, Serbia, Russia, Germany, Thailand, New Zealand, Bosnia and Herzegovina and have a total membership worldwide of over 1,000 Members
- Outcasts - a West Australian gang that has migrated east to Sydney and Brisbane. The confidentiality has kept names under the radar except for its founder and ex-leader FEZ who is unknown.
- DLASTHR - An Assyrian gang formed by Raymon Youmaran (who is now jailed for murder) in 2002, in the western suburbs of Sydney. The gang has been on the police radar since the mid-2000s.
- Finks - Formed in Adelaide, South Australia, in 1969 and now has chapters in other states. It was reported in October 2013 that most members were to switch to the United States-based Mongols.
- Black Bandits - A youth gang founded in Marsden, Queensland in 2015 and now active across all over Queensland. Consisting of over 400 members, they are notoriously known for burglary and armed robberies.
- Gypsy Joker - The Gypsy Joker MC formed in the US in the late 60's and later amalgamated with South Australia's pre-eminent bad-boys club, Mandamas MC and later joined with the American-formed club, are most notorious for the 2001 car-bomb murders of West Australian police senior investigator Don Hancock and Lawrence Lewis. They have between 200 and 300 members in Australia.
- Hells Angels - Founded in the US and one of the "Big Four" American gangs, now active worldwide. In Australia, they have 150-250 members. The Angels have a Nomad Chapter which has caused friction with the Nomads MC.
- Nomads - The Nomads club has no website and is not as widely known as other clubs, but does have a significant presence in the press as an outlaw motorcycle club engaged in allegedly illegal activities.
- Notorious - The club Notorious, a Middle Eastern gang, started competing with Australian bikie gangs, in a turf war for drug sales. Notorious was reportedly using members of the Middle Eastern and Islander communities in Sydney. As of March 2012 the gang no longer exists as an organised structure after being dismantled by a police operation arresting key members and with other members choosing to quit the gang life.
- Rebels - The Rebels are the largest outlaw motorcycle club in Australia, and have 29 chapters. They are a more traditional club and are run by former boxer and founding member, Alex Vella. They are by far the largest club in Australia with around 2,000 members.

==== Others ====
- Black Uhlans Motorcycle Club
- Bros Motorcycle Club
- Club Deroes Motorcycle Club
- Coffin Cheaters Motorcycle Club
- Derelicts Motorcycle Club
- Descendants Motorcycle Club
- Devils Henchmen Motorcycle Club
- Foolish Few Motorcycle Club
- Fourth Reich Motorcycle Club
- Gladiators Motorcycle Club
- God's Garbage Motorcycle Club
- Lone Wolf Motorcycle Club
- Loners Motorcycle Club
- Muslim Brotherhood Movement Motorcycle Club
- Rock Machine Motorcycle Club
- Renegades Motorcycle Club
- Satan's Riders Motorcycle Club
- Satan's Soldiers Motorcycle Club

=== Youth gangs ===
In contemporary Australia, "youth gangs" are perceived to be an increasing problem, but this notion has been claimed to be not founded upon any extended body of empirical evidence and does not identify to whom the alleged gangs are a problem. Nevertheless, the public perception of the 'street gang' is generally quite the opposite, as it is based upon media generated gang stereotypes that allegedly engage in any new horror.

During the early 1990s, Chris Cunneen's investigation into the stereotyping of ethnic gangs revealed that during the same period, not only Asian, but Lebanese and Pacific Islander youths were subjected to unnecessary discrimination by police. In July 1994, the Youth Justice Coalition of NSW reported that young people who were recognisably non-Anglo-Australian, especially those who identified themselves as Asian, Aboriginal or Pacific Islander, were being vigorously searched and arrested by police to a point of harassment.

In November 1994, a series of Daily Telegraph Mirror stories generated sufficient public concern about alleged crime levels in Sydney that it gave NSW Labor Party leader, Bob Carr, the opportunity to mount a political campaign based on gang violence. Three days later, NSW Premier, John Fahey, introduced the Children (Parental Responsibility) Bill 1994 which made parents criminally liable for the offences of their children and gave police the power to detain "at risk" or offending children for a period of 24 hours. In October 1998, another Sydney based moral panic over ethnic gangs was precipitated by the stabbing death of a fourteen year old schoolboy, Edward Lee. The police and the media "fed off each other" linking the crime to ethnicity . The media dutifully circulated police descriptions of racial phenotypes which clearly linked Lebanese males to crime and gangs, while the major NSW political parties took the opportunity to focus upon the forthcoming state election and to begin to out-bid each other on law and order issues.

There are many suburban gangs throughout Melbourne involving clashes between North-West and North-East. As well as ongoing battles in Sydney's and Melbourne's Western suburbs, as well as Melbourne's south-eastern suburbs. There are many other gangs evolving throughout the outer suburbs of Brisbane and the inner Gold Coast. There have been increasing cases of Australian gangs notably Allied Brotherz, Menace To Society and The Brotherhood and those claiming the name of American street gangs notably Black P Stones, Black Disciples, Latin Kings, MS-13, Bloods and Crips. There have also been cases of radical gangs such as Friends Stand United, Public Enemy No. 1, Volksfront and Blood & Honour in Australia.

Modern youth gangs in Australia have been heavily linked to drill rap groups, often representing postcodes.

=== New South Wales ===
==== Sydney ====
Gang warfare in the western suburbs of Sydney was at its highest during the "postcode wars" in 2019. Several of the groups mentioned below may no longer be in existence. Three members of drill rap group 21 District brothers Malik, Jay, and Ronnie Nikua, have since reformed and are involved in youth outreach work to deter Pasifika youth from becoming involved in crime. Malik had spent some years in jail after a violent brawl, and wanted to prevent other youth from following this path. The Pacific and Australian Community Services, founded by Bruce Pikula, holds mentoring sessions at Oran Park Leisure Centre.

As of 2026, police say that gang crime is around a power struggle between the Alameddine crime family and the "Coconut Cartel", comprising various gang members "with links to the Pacific Islander community".

Gang (2019)	Postcode(s)	Notes and references
21 District	2161 (Guildford)	21 District was a drill rap group and postcode gang that had a major rivalry with Onefour, both the drill group Onefour (formerly) and the gang NF14. The gang was an alliance of the three subgangs: the IWB, the KVT and Proper 60, formed due to a mutual rivalry with Onefour. After 21 District member Malik Nikua spent some years in prison, as of October 2026 he and his two brothers are involved in youth outreach work.
67 Boys/God's Ruthless Children (GRC)	2767 (Doonside)	67's main rivals are NF14, with violence between the two "opps" (opposing groups) frequently occurring across Sydney.
Cabra Boys	2166 (Cabramatta)	The Cabra Boys' main rivals are the Claymore Boys. When Alex Ioane, an innocent 18-year-old Sydneysider, was wrongly accused as being part of the Claymore Boys, the Cabra Boys bashed him to death as a result. This led to several members of both groups being arrested and charged with murder.
Claymore Boys	2559 (Claymore)	The Claymore Boys are known to have connections with the drill rap group Claymore 046. The gang's main rivals are the Cabra Boys.
IWB	2142 (Granville); 2144 (Auburn); 2150 (Parramatta)	"IWB" is an acronym of "Inner West Brotherhood", despite the fact that none of the gang's territory is located within the Inner West region. The IWB is a combination of gangs hailing from several suburbs that lie within postcodes that begin with "21".
KVT	2160 (Merrylands, Merrylands West)	"KVT" is an abbreviation of "Kaiviti Family" (Kaiviti is a Fijian term that refers to Indigenous Fijians, officially known in Fiji as "iTaukei"). The KVT are a predominantly Fijian gang regionally known for allegedly being used as a "muscle" by the Alameddine crime network and the Comanchero Motorcycle Club.
MOB	2163 (Villlawood)	MOB have been linked to several investigated and suspected of committing, but to date have not lead to any arrests, high profile crimes. MOB also is believe to have deep undocumented and yet to be proven links to multiple crime entities in Sydney, including OMC groups and organised crime syndicates also believed to be involved in the fatal shooting of a 35-year-old in Chester Hill in October 2021. Its active status is unknown.
G40	2142 (Granville); 2161 (Guildford)	G40 (Gee-40) Is one of the most oldest street gangs in Sydney, dating back to the 2000s-2010s. They were/are the main rivals of The Mounty County coalition (including that of NF14). They have a lengthy presence including The Mt Druitt Train Station Brawl. The street gang is the ally of other 21xx street gangs.
Full Blooded Islanders	2770 (Mount Druitt); 2760 (Colyton)	Full Blooded Islanders (FBI) is also one of the oldest street gangs in Sydney, from the 1990s originating from New Zealand and crossing over towards Sydney. The Full Blooded Islanders gang has had an lengthy presence also, being present and an ally in the 2000s-2010s with The Mounty County coalition. The gang was only mentioned once in the latest song "Luxford" by NF14. Since then, it is unknown whether the street gang is still active or not.
3T	2142 (Granville); 2161 (Guildford); 2166 (Cabramatta); 2150 (Parramatta); 2165 (Fairfield)	3T (3 Taganes) is also one of the oldest street gangs, being allied with G40. They had a prominence back in the 2010s and were allied with 21 District and other 21xx postcode gangs, and were the main rivals of The Mounty County coalition (including that of NF14). The gang is currently defunct.
NF14	2770 (Mount Druitt)	NF14 is one of the largest youth gangs in Sydney. The gang has been linked to many crimes across Sydney, many of which have been fatal.> It has been reported that the all-Pasifika drill group Onefour, also from Mount Druitt, is named after the gang; however, the group denies this, saying that the name derives from the year in which they started working together, 2014. It has been reported that more than 10 young men have been stabbed to death by members of the group in 2021, 2022 and 2023 alone.
Proper 60	2160 (Merrylands)	Proper 60 is known to have links to R4W (Ready 4 War), the drug-dealing arm of the Alameddine crime clan.

=== Queensland ===
==== Brisbane ====
Gang	Postcode(s)	Notes and references
SBG (Swish Bound Gorillaz) Associate Gangs: GSK & GMS	4300, 4301, 4303, 4305, 4306 (Ipswich, Queensland)	Syler Stevens the leader and founder of the SBG is an Ipswich-based gang active in suburbs like Redbank, Goodna, and Springfield. They have a major rivalry with SSD (Southside Drillas).
SSD (Southside Drillas)	4077 (southern Brisbane)	Abdi Kaffar, Abdi Fattar are the leaders the SSD is a dominant gang in southern Brisbane suburbs such as Inala. Known for violent territorial control and frequent clashes with rival gangs, SSD maintains a strong alliance with the Sunnybank Hills Scooter Gang.
Sunnybank Hills Scooter Gang (aka Sunnybank Demons)	4109 (Sunnybank, Queensland)	Primarily led by Asian members, the Sunnybank Hills Scooter Gang operates a widespread drug cartel throughout southern Brisbane. They dominate local scooter culture scenes and street-level operations, controlling significant trafficking routes and maintaining tight security around their territories. Their alliance with SSD in Inala reinforces their regional power.
Scooby Doo Fortnite Gang (SDFG)	4114 (Logan City, Queensland)	SDFG is an emerging street gang reported to be active in Logan and surrounding suburbs. Authorities believe the group is involved in low-level drug distribution and property crime. SDFG maintains a strong social media presence, using gaming culture references and stylised branding to appeal to younger recruits. The group's leadership is known for blending digital influence with street-level operations, creating challenges for traditional law enforcement approaches.

==== Sunshine Coast ====
Gang	Postcode(s)	Notes and references
AntiFC	4557 (Mooloolaba)	The Anti-Fashion Crew of Mooloolaba, better known as the AntiFC, is a minor gang in the suburb of Mooloolaba. The gang reportedly lacks any formal identity and members are alleged to hang around the back streets of Mooloolaba and at the local McDonald's.
Caloundra Boys	4551 (Caloundra)	The Caloundra Boys are one of two major gangs on the Sunshine Coast, the other being the rival Kawana Boys. Members of the gang have been known to have tattoos referencing Caloundra's postcode, 4551. The gang rivalry between Caloundra and Kawana reportedly started around 30 years ago.
Footy Boys	4557 (Mountain Creek)	The Footy Boys are a minor gang supposedly composed of junior rugby league players. The gang reportedly lacks any formal identity.
Kawana Boys	4575 (Kawana Waters)	The Kawana Boys are one of two major gangs on the Sunshine Coast, the other being the rival Caloundra Boys. Members of the gang have been known to have tattoos referencing Kawana Waters' postcode, 4575. The gang rivalry between Caloundra and Kawana reportedly started around 30 years ago.
Maroochydore Boys	4558 (Maroochydore)	The Maroochydore Boys are a minor gang that reportedly lacks any formal identity.
Capital Bonner Killas (CBK)	2914 (Bonner)	CBK is a youth advised gang that has been included in many fatals in the Bonner/Amaroo area. Also the ‘youngers’ of another gang “ABK”

== East and Southeast Asian gangs ==
As of 2012, Chinese organised crime syndicates in Sydney have looked to Chinese youths on student visas for their recruitment drives. In a 2011 report, multimillion-dollar prostitution rackets have been operating in Melbourne for several years, one of the largest by Mulgrave woman Xue Di Yan.

In 1988 media report stated: 'criminal gangs are moving into drugs and gambling, establishing links with Australian crime figures'.

In a 1993 report, criminals were engaged in securing a market. By organising its own importations of drugs, they was able to greatly reduce its reliance (and its overheads) on the Chinese criminals who supply the greater proportion of the market.

In 1994, Western Australia's Deputy Police Commissioner, Mr Les Ayton, said there is good intelligence and anecdotal evidence that criminals are importing drugs. A media report in April 1994 cited Queensland police sources as believing that drugs had been sent to Queensland during the earlier part of 1994

In a 1995 report, criminal groups have been involved in distributing drugs, including in Sydney. According to a 1994 report, criminal groups purchase from Chinese importers and to wholesale to other groups, such as Romanian and Lebanese dealers.

=== Major Asian gangs, (including Chinese Triads/Tongs) ===
- 14K
- Bamboo Union
- Sam Gor
- Sun Yee On
- Sword Boys
- Wo Shing Wo

=== Middle Eastern gangs ===
For a long time, Middle Eastern gang organisations conducted extortion against nightclubs, ram raids, and car theft. More recently, drive-by shootings have become more common, with tit for tat drive by shooting starting as early as 1998, and becoming more common in recent years, including a drive by machine gun attack on a police station in Lakemba, Sydney.

In 2006, a permanent Middle Eastern organised crime squad was set up following revenge attacks, including stabbings and assaults, by Middle Eastern youths following the Cronulla riots.

=== Major Arab and Middle Eastern gangs ===
- Lebanese mafia
- Alameddine crime network - predominantly Lebanese, with other Middle Eastern ethnic groups. The gang operates out of Merrylands, New South Wales.
- Brothers for Life – mostly Lebanese, composed of Middle Eastern/Arab men.

=== Aboriginal and Indigenous-based gangs ===
Western Australian authorities have identified several street and prison gangs associated with the state's custodial population, including Naala Moort|Naala Moort, One Tribe, Our Brothers Keeper and Mixed Blood Gangsters. In 2019, the Western Australian Department of Justice reported that One Tribe had 36 identified affiliates in custody, Naala Moort had 16, and Our Brothers Keeper and Mixed Blood Gangsters each had nine. The department cautioned that gang membership and association were fluid and changeable and that the figures might not include unidentified or unconfirmed members or associates.

- Naala Moort, (Indigenous Western Australian MC - Multi-cultural members: Predominantly Aboriginal with Polynesian, Asian, Middle Eastern, Greek, Italian and other European members. Est in 2008, Western Australia. Club hhapters in Perth, Goldfields, Pilbara, Kimberley, Northern Territory, North Queensland and Central NSW. High-ranking members signifying a diamond shape tattoo with 113 in the centre of diamond, usually found on the hand, meaning ‘Aboriginal Mafia’.) is a Western Australian street gang which has been described in news reports as being predominantly ethnically Aboriginal. In February 2018, police raided premises on Rogers Street in Midland which they described as the gang's clubhouse. Police allegedly seized 112 grams of methamphetamine and charged two men, including Donald Collard, who was described by police as the group's president. The arrests followed an investigation by detectives in Carnarvon into the alleged transportation and distribution of methamphetamine between Perth and regional areas of Western Australia. Later that month, two women were charged after police alleged that they had sold methamphetamine in Carnarvon on behalf of Naala Moort and deposited the proceeds into bank accounts connected to the organisation. In 2019, the Department of Justice recorded 16 people affiliated with Naala Moort in the Western Australian custodial estate.
- One Tribe, in 2019, the Western Australian Department of Justice identified One Tribe as a gang present within the state's custodial estate. The department recorded 36 people affiliated with the group, the highest number among the six non-outlaw-motorcycle gangs listed in its response to a parliamentary committee. The figure represented recorded custodial affiliations and was not an estimate of the gang's total membership in the wider community.
- Our Brothers Keeper, also referred to as OBK, was identified by the Western Australian Department of Justice as a gang operating within the state's custodial environment. In 2019, the department recorded nine prisoners affiliated with the Gang. The department did not provide details concerning the group's leadership, territory, membership structure or criminal activities in its response.
- Mixed Blood Gangsters was among the non-outlaw-motorcycle gangs identified by the Western Australian Department of Justice within the state's custodial estate. In 2019, the department recorded nine prisoners affiliated with the Gang. Publicly available information concerning the organisation's history, structure and activities is limited.
- Koondoola Girrawheen Balga/KGB.

=== Pacific islander (Māori, Samoans & Others) ===
- Black Power - Mixed ethnic makeup, but predominantly Polynesian including Māori.
- Mongrel Mob - Mixed nationalities, but predominantly Polynesian including Māori.
- Coconut Cartel - predominantly Polynesian, with other multi-ethnic minority representation.

=== Anglo-Celtic/White supremacist ===
- Australian Defence League
- Kinahan Organised Crime Group
- National Socialist Network
- Soldiers of Odin

=== Other European (Southern and Eastern European) ===
- Bulgarian mafia
- The Carlton Crew
- Greek mafia
- Honoured Society
- Romanian mafia
- Russian mafia
- Serbian mafia
- Siderno Group
- Pettingill family

=== Hispanic/Latino ===
- MS-13
- Mexican Mafia
- Sinaloa Cartel

=== Multiracial & Other ===
- Bronx Boys
- True Kings
- Various Bloods sets
- Various Crips sets
- Five block/FBD - a gang from the suburbs Ellenbrook and Brabham in the state of Perth.
- EBkrazy/Ellenbrook Killers - A gang in relation to the gang, TTK/ Train to Kill in the suburb of Ellenbrook from Perth. EBkrazy is know for their violent behaviour in Ellenbrook and has been fear over the couple of Years.

=== Defunct criminal groups ===
- Gardiner–Hall gang
- Rocks Push
- Williams Syndicate
- 5T (gang)
- Mobshitters Motorcycle Club
- Notorious Motorcycle Club (Australia)

== See also ==
- Organised crime in Australia

== Books ==
- Edwards, Peter; Nájera, Luis (2021). The Wolfpack The Millennial Mobsters Who Brought Chaos and the Cartels to the Canadian Underworld. Toronto: Random House of Canada. ISBN 9780735275409.
- Sher, Julian; Marsden, William (2006). Angels of Death: Inside the Bikers' Empire of Crime. Toronto: Alfred Knopf Canada. ISBN 9780307370327.

== Further information ==
- "History of Gangs in Australia". ABC, Late night live. ABC Radio National
- Silvester, John (24 September 2006). "Outlaw gangs make killing". The Age.
- Priest, Tim. "The rise of Middle Eastern Crime in Australia" (PDF). Archived from the original (PDF) on 17 July 2012.
- Buttler, Mark "Neighbours fear gang violence will spiral into gun battles as secret police report exposes fears of open warfare"
- Gao-Miles, Linling (2017). "Beyond the Ethnic Enclave: Interethnicity andTrans-spatiality in an Australian Suburb". LINLING GAO-MILES, Washington University in St. Louis. 29 (1). City & Society: 82–103. doi:10.1111/ciso.12113.
