= Brothers for Life =

Australian crime gang

- Founded by: Bassam Hamzy
- Years active: 2007–present
- Territory: Sydney, New South Wales, Australia
- Ethnicity: Middle Eastern (mostly Lebanese Arab Australians)
- Membership (est.): Unknown
- Criminal activities: Drug trafficking, extortion, money laundering, drive-by shootings, armed robbery, contract killings, murder, assault, kidnapping
- Rivals: Alameddine crime network

Brothers for Life (often stylised as B4L or BFL), also referred to as the Hamzy Family, (after the founders of the main Bankstown faction), is a Middle Eastern criminal organisation based in the South-Western suburbs of Sydney, Australia. Brothers for Life first came to public prominence in the early 2010s as internal disputes between its Bankstown and Blacktown chapters resulted in a violent gang war. Between 2020 and 2022, the gang was again in the public eye as one side of a new conflict, then against the Alameddine crime network. Since 2024, the gang has been active in Melbourne.

== Founding (2007) ==
The Brothers for Life gang was founded by Bassam Hamzy. The son of Lebanese-Australian immigrants Khaled and Lola, Hamzy was sentenced to 21 years' imprisonment in 2002 for the May 1998 shooting murder of Kris Toumazis outside of the Mr Goodbar nightclub in Darlinghurst.

Police first heard of 'Brothers 4 Life' following a raid on Hamzy's jail cell in early 2007. Preceding the raid, officers observed that Hamzy had become the ring-leader of eleven other Supermax inmates whom he had converted to a radicalised sect of Islam. In his cell, an array of drawings and written materials were recovered, including a printed photograph of Osama bin Laden, a hand-drawn logo bearing the words "assassins Australia FFL" with depictions of AK-47 assault rifles, and notes which appeared to refer to financial transactions. Papers were found containing alleged gang slogans, such as "Solja Warrior We don fear death and sometimes we wish for it [sic]", and "Courage, honour, no mercy, mercy 4 da weak, family 4 life and BFL [brothers for life]". Following these findings, Hamzy was placed in isolation.

In April 2008, a mobile phone was discovered in Hamzy's cell at Lithgow Correctional Centre, prompting detectives from the Middle-Eastern Organised Crime (MEOC) squad to begin monitoring its activity. Between 1 May and 11 June 2008, the device made over 19,000 calls, meaning an average of around 460 per day, as Hamzy ran his gang of at least twelve from jail. On 4 December 2008, overnight raids took place across Sydney, yielding the arrests of his father Khaled, 57; his brother Ghassan Amoun, 22; his cousin Khaled Hamzy jr, 27; and associates Mohammad Abbas, 28; and Thomas Miholic, 36.

Members of the syndicate allegedly transported around $250,000 worth of drugs from Sydney to Melbourne each week. Police charged the group with the supply of 3.8 kilograms of methamphetamine, 6.6 kilograms of cannabis, and 600 grams of ecstasy, as well as with dealing with the proceeds of crime totalling around $276,000 in cash. During the raids, at least 25,000 pills, a loaded firearm, and a drug laboratory were uncovered.

Around 2008 and 2009, several youth street gangs, the most prominent being the Muslim Brotherhood Movement (MBM), emerged in the vicinity of Auburn, the area which is home to several families aligned with the B4L network. During this time, B4L became closely allied with both MBM, and the Bandidos.

In August 2011, police declared that MBM was "dismantled and disrupted". In turn, B4L took over in the area, absorbing the remnants of MBM, and prolific Assyrian street-gang DLASTHR (The Last Hour), including member Michael Odisho.

== Timeline (2010-2013) ==
On 1 August 2010, Saba Kairouz, 26, a convicted drug dealer, was shot to death while playing touch football at Roberts Park in Greenacre.

On 3 August 2010, B4L member Khaled Kahwaji, 27, was arrested at his home in Monterey and charged with Kairouz's murder.

Sometime around June 2011, Kahwaji's murder charge was withdrawn.

On 21 July 2012, a shootout ensued outside BFL member Khaled Khalil's house on Broughton Street in Old Guildford, with Khalil shooting back at a gunman who opened fire on him with a homemade MAC-10 machine gun. Bullets allegedly hit two neighbouring properties, and an occupant of one of the houses required treatment from paramedics after being struck by a bullet fragment.

On 29 August 2012, Hasan Gotkas, 16, the son of Hamzy family rival Hakan Gotkas, was left in critical condition after being gunned down alongside his father in front of the apartment block where Maha Hamze lived in Auburn. Hakan drove his son to the hospital, dropped him at the door, and then drove away. He and his family were not cooperative with police.

On 14 October 2012, B4L members Bassim Hijazi, 32, and Yehya Amood, 27, were shot at eleven times as they sat in a car in Greenacre. Amood later died from his injuries. In the aftermath of the shooting, Hijazi, the driver of the vehicle, refused to co-operate with police and fled to Lebanon. This shooting, and the shooting of six days prior, were provoked by Hijazi and Ali having allegedly said that Mohammed 'Little Crazy' Hamzy's wife, Meltem Yarar, was a "gold digger" and a "slut".

Hamzy lured Hijazi to the location of the attack and shot at the vehicle. Hamzy did not know that Amood was also inside the car. Hamzy, remorseful over the accidental death, allegedly approached a friend of his after the shooting in an attempt to deliver financial compensation to Amood's two wives. At the time of the shooting, Hijazi was allegedly a lieutenant of B4L's Blacktown chapter.

On 17 October 2012, a drive-by shooting targeted a home in Winston Hills which was allegedly linked to BFL members.

On 18 December 2012, Bachir 'Barry' Arja, 27, was shot to death in front of his elderly mother outside his home in Punchbowl. Following the murder of Arja, who was described as 'a petty criminal with drug links' by the Sydney Morning Herald, several young men wearing B4L attire arrived at the scene of the crime. Less than a month prior, Ali Hachem Eid, 38, the husband of Arja's cousin Sanaa Arja, was shot to death by two masked gunmen in Punchbowl.

On 8 February 2013, five junior members of B4L were arrested by Strike Force Apollo over a random attack on a civilian in Haymarket.

On 9 February 2013, an unknown B4L member, identified by the pseudonym 'Julian', was shot three times in the leg by fellow gang member Faoud Ekermawi, 35. The shooting was provoked by 'Julian' dipping into the gang's cocaine supply and consuming $7,000 of it. Ekermawi had fronted 'Julian' the cocaine so he could re-establish himself as a drug dealer since 'Julian' had left the gang a month prior, and was rejoining. After hiding out in fear of the consequences for his theft, 'Julian' finally surfaced to meet with Ekermawi. Disciplinary action was decided, and 'Julian' was put into a car with Ekermawi and Michael Odisho. As they drove, Faoud, 'Julian's' best friend, told him “you made me look like a gronk,” before making a gun gesture with his fingers, saying “you know the way I pull up people, not with my fist".

As Ekermawi spoke, Odisho, who had been sent along to ensure the job was done, loaded a .25 calibre pistol and handed it to Ekermawi, who shot 'Julian'. They dropped 'Julian' off where they had first picked him up, and he drove himself to Bankstown Hospital. After refusing to talk to detectives at the hospital, once he was discharged, police visited 'Julian' at his house. After being threatened with having his parole revoked for hindering an investigation, he agreed to become a police informant. The co-operation of 'Julian', who was most commonly known from this point onwards as 'Witness A', marked a breakthrough for law enforcement's efforts against B4L.

On 19 February 2013, Michael Odisho, 28, and Faoud Ekermawi, 35, were arrested and charged over the October 2012 Winston Hills shooting, and the 9 February knee-capping, as a result of Witness A's testimony.

On 9 March 2013, Maha Hamze, the aunt of BFL founder Bassam Hamzy, was shot eight times in the legs through the front door of her home in Auburn. The shooting was committed by Sydney criminal Reynold Glover, who was jailed for murder in 1999. Glover spent 176 days on remand before the murder charge was dropped, and he pleaded guilty to robbery in company. In 2009, Glover was accused of a series of armed robberies on armoured cash-in-transit vans where $6 million was stolen. He was found not guilty of all charges, however, he was eventually convicted of the armed robbery of a transit van outside Broadway Shopping Centre in 2013. Glover supposedly committed the shooting of Bilal Hamze's mother Maha as retaliation against Bilal stealing $5,000 from Glover's mother whilst he was incarcerated. Glover was later convicted of attempted murder in relation to the incident and given a twenty-year sentence.

On 9 March 2013, twenty minutes after the attack on Maha Hamze, shots were fired into the home of Hamzy family rival Hakan Gotkas in a nearby street.

On 15 March 2013, B4L member Khaled Kahwaji, 29, was shot to death in his car outside a home on Wilbur Street in Greenacre.

On 17 March 2013, Bassam Hamzy got into a brawl with Glover at Silverwater Correctional Complex. Glover was in jail over the Maha Hamze shooting. Prior to the dispute over Bilal, Glover and Hamzy had had a positive relationship.

On 2 August 2013, a house on Lignite Place in Eagle Vale was targeted in a drive-by shooting by unknown B4L members.

On 8 August 2013, Bassim Hijazi resurfaced in Sydney, and was charged with trying to rob a Louis Vuitton store in Sydney central business district. He was allegedly attempting to steal around $400,000 in goods. BFL member Adam Achrafi was also charged over the incident.

On 11 September 2013, B4L members Nazir Akbari, 27, and Mesbah Mirzael, 25, were arrested and charged with demanding property in company with menace, as well as with knowingly participating in a criminal group. The charges stemmed from an extortion attempt against Hornsby businessman Mohammed Farooq Mangal, who owned a smash-repair shop. Between 13 July and 27 August, Akbari and Mirzael visited Mangal's business with "at least four other men" on several occasions, with Akbari demanding $15,000 and Mirzael demanding $40,000. The pair threatened that if their demands weren't met, that they would burn down the shop whilst Mangal was inside.

== Bankstown/Blacktown War (2013) ==
By the middle of 2013, the B4L gang was divided into two factions. The Bankstown faction consisted primarily of Lebanese Australians. The Blacktown faction consisted primarily of Afghan Australians. The newly-formed Blacktown faction was led by Farhad 'The Afghan' Quami, who had just been released from jail after meeting Bassam Hamzy behind bars, who directed him to "keep the Lebo (Bankstown) chapter in check". Quami had previously escaped a double murder conviction in 2009 for the 29 March 2006 killings of Bassam Chami and Ibrahim Asaad in Granville, and a separate murder conviction relating to the 2005 death of underworld figure Cengiz Sarac, which was tossed at committal in 2012.

Quami's main objective was allegedly to overthrow the Bankstown chapter and take over the entirety of the syndicate. To start out with, Quami's faction was delegated territory from Granville to Penrith. Quami was allegedly not satisfied with this arrangement, and in a July 2013 meeting at the Blacktown faction's clubhouse, he gathered his crew and outlined his vision to dominate the city's underworld, stating that they were "going to give Sydney something they've never seen before".

Farhad Quami is alleged to have had an issue with Bankstown faction leader Mohammed 'Little Crazy' Hamzy from the start, harbouring jealousy over his power, money and lifestyle. As a result, Quami was waiting for the opportunity to arise to usurp Hamzy and take control over his crew. Justification to do so then came when rumours of murder-plots against him from the Lebanese chapter began circulating.

== Bankstown/Blacktown War Timeline (2013) ==
Sometime in October 2013, six members of B4L's Blacktown chapter were allegedly behind a home invasion in Castlereagh. They supposedly forced entry into the home before firing several shots at a 26-year-old occupant of the residence, as well as shooting the man's dog.

On 6 October 2013, BFL member Adam Achrafi, 18, was shot twice outside his home on Guildford Road in Guildford.

On 29 October 2013, Mahmoud Hamzy, 27, was shot to death, and another B4L member, Omar Ajaj, 24, was shot and wounded, at Mohammed 'Little Crazy' Hamzy's home on Bardo Circuit in Revesby Heights. Ajaj was Mahmoud Hamzy's cousin. The shooting was allegedly targeting Mohammed Hamzy, who managed to escape the ambush. In the aftermath of the attack, rather than keeping a low profile, other members of the Bankstown chapter showed up at the shooting scene, including Mohammed Hamzy, who returned to the site in his $150,000 Ford Mustang that sported 'MEOC' on the license plate - an acronym meaning Middle-Eastern organised crime.

On 3 November 2013, Michael Odisho was shot several times outside his mother's home in Winston Hills.

On 4 November 2013, Masood Zakaria's 13-year-old sister was shot and seriously wounded at her family home on Sunnyholt Road in Blacktown. Masood was the target of the shooting.

On 7 November 2013, Bankstown faction president Mohammed Hamzy, 28, was arrested and charged over the October 2012 murder of Yehye Amood. On the same day, Mahmoud Sanoussi, 28, and Omar Ajaj, 24, were arrested and charged over the October 2012 kneecapping of B4L member Alex Ali in Yagoona. During Ajaj's bail hearing, the court heard that he had a 2012 conviction for child pornography on his criminal record. At the time of his arrest, he was also awaiting sentencing on separate charges of assault and disposing of a knife.

On 7 November 2013, three men aligned with B4L's Lebanese chapter were shot and wounded in a vehicle outside the Chokolatte Cafe on West Terrace in Bankstown. The wounded men were Abdul Abu-Mahmoud, Khalid Souied, and Hassan Souied. The shooting targeted Abu-Mahmoud, who worked at the Chokolatte Cafe at the time, for allegedly being involved in attempting to locate Farhad Quami's secret address. Later that evening, Blacktown chapter members Sarkhel Rokhzayi, 22, Mobin Merzaei, Wahed Karimi, and Jamil Quami, 20, were arrested and charged over the shooting. The four of them faced a combined total of 72 charges, and none applied for bail.

On 15 November 2013, a modified SKS type semi-automatic rifle and a thirty-round magazine were seized during the raid of a Liverpool home in police raids targeting B4L. A 29-year-old man "thought to be connected to the gang" was present at the home during the raid.

On 28 November 2013, B4L member Mobin Merzaei's older brother Sina Merzaei, 27, a Nomads bikie, was shot in the arms and legs at a home on Salisbury Road in Guildford.

On 29 November 2013, an unidentified 16-year-old boy was shot in the foot in a drive-by shooting at a unit complex on Greenacre Road in Greenacre where members of B4L are known to have lived. Police would not confirm if the boy had links to B4L.

On 12 December 2013, an unidentified member of B4L's Blacktown chapter who had agreed to become a police informant led investigators to a bag filled with $170,000 worth of MDMA (ecstasy) tablets and a shotgun and revolver - both of which had been used in previous shootings.

On 16 December 2013, Joe Antoun, a well-known standover man, was shot dead at his home in Strathfield.

On 31 December 2013, Farhad Quami was shot whilst aboard the Oscar II, a luxurious charter yacht hired for a New Year's Eve party, as the vessel pulled into Rose Bay ferry wharf. Around an hour later, police were called to Lamrock Avenue in Bondi Beach, where they found Quami suffering from a gunshot wound. Quami was treated at St Vincent's Hospital for a shoulder wound before discharging himself. He refused to cooperate with police. Also present on the yacht at the time of the shooting was Mumtaz Quami, Blacktown B4L member Fawad Bari, and a 'small group of Italians', who had allegedly gathered to give Adam Freeman, the son of Kings Cross identity George Freeman, an extravagant send-off before he began a jail sentence.

== Bankstown/Blacktown war aftermath and legal proceedings (2014-2020) ==
On 8 January 2014, three senior members of B4L's Blacktown faction, including Farhad and Mumtaz Quami, were arrested by detectives attached to Strike Force Sitella and charged with criminal group and firearm offences. The firearms seized by police were taken for forensic examination.

On 11 January 2014, crime reporter Yoni Bashan of The Daily Telegraph reported that ballistics had already linked firearms seized from Quami to crimes, however, investigations were to continue into whether they were related to, the murder of Joe Antoun, the near-identical murder of Antoun's business partner Vasko Boskovski, or the murder of Mahmoud Hamzy.

On 16 January 2014, B4L Blacktown member Kasim Ali Khan, 24, was charged over the murder of Joe Antoun.

On 21 January 2014, Navid Khalili, 25, was arrested at Silverwater Correctional Complex and also charged over the Antoun murder. On the same day, Jamil Quami, 22, who was already jailed at Silverwater for his role in the Chokolatte Cafe shooting, was charged with firearm possession and drug supply offences.

On 30 January 2014, it was announced that a ban on the displaying and/or wearing of twenty-two outlaw motorcycle clubs' insignia ('colours') in pubs and clubs in Kings Cross would now extend to include B4L.

On 20 February 2014, an unidentified B4L member, 27, was arrested at the South Coast Correctional Centre in Nowra and charged over a 2 August 2013 drive-by shooting committed in Eagle Vale. At the time of his arrest, News.com.au reported that the 27-year-old was the second man to be arrested over the event after an "alleged Brothers For Life faction leader".

On 4 March 2014, two B4L Blacktown members, aged 18 and 28, were arrested and charged over the shooting of Michael Odisho in Winston Hills, and Masood Zakaria's sister in Blacktown, which occurred within a day of each another in November 2013.

On 7 March 2014, News.com.au reported that Farhad Quami, Mumtaz Quami, Jamil Quami, and an unidentified 22-year-old man were to be charged in Sydney's Central Local Court that day over the November 2013 shootings of Zakaria's sister and Michael Odisho. "Some of the men" also expected to face charges relating to the Chokolatte Cafe shooting, and shootings committed in Eagle Vale in August and Pendle Hill in October. As of 7 March 2014, police had allegedly charged 13 members of the Blacktown faction of B4L over the 2013 shootings.

On 11 March 2014, Omar Ajaj's home was shot at in a drive-by shooting in Auburn. At the time, Ajaj was in still in jail.

On 21 March 2014, an unidentified 18 year old member of the B4L gang was arrested after a police pursuit and hit with dangerous driving and drug charges.

In April 2014, the shooter in the 9 February 2013 kneecapping was granted immunity from prosecution in exchange for testimony against Michael Odisho, and in other trials.

On 8 July 2014, Blacktown B4L member Nazir Akbari, who was already in jail over other matters, was arrested and charged with shooting and wounding a Bankstown B4L member in July 2013 in Wentworthville. On the same day, six other members of the faction were charged with further offences in relation to an October 2013 Castlereagh break-in and shooting. These members were Farhad Quami, 31; Mumtaz Quami, 29; Navid Khalili, 25; Fazal Bari, 24; Mobin Merzaei, 22; and Jamil Quami, 22.

On 14 July 2014, News.com.au reported that the ongoing cases of B4L members, including Farhad Quami, Jamil Qaumi, Wahid Karimi, Mohammed Kalal and Sarkhel Rokhzay, had all received mentions in Burwood Local Court.

By 9 October 2014, Amanda Crowe, 32, a former legal clerk, had been charged over her role within the B4L Blacktown chapter, and had already been granted $1.4 million bail. Crowe was described in court documents as an "unlikely right-hand woman" to faction boss Farhad Quami, having allegedly ordered Mobin Merzaei, Mohammed Kalal and a third man to shoot Abdul Abu-Mahmoud on 7 November 2013.

On 27 October 2014, Amanda Crowe was charged with the October 2013 murder of Mahmoud Hamzy and wounding of Omar Ajaj, and with conspiring to murder Mohammed 'Little Crazy' Hamzy, as were Farhad Quami, Jamil Quami and Mumtaz Quami, though Farhad and Mumtaz were also charged with the murder of Joe Antoun.

Sometime in October 2014, former B4L member Alex Ali testified against Mohammed 'Little Crazy' Hamzy at the NSW Supreme Court in regards to the shooting attack against him outside World Gym in Yagoona on 8 October 2012.

On 11 December 2014, Bassam Hamzy's mother Lola, 57, was shot in the stomach through her home's front door in Auburn. She was then taken to Westmead Hospital where she underwent emergency surgery.

On 27 August 2015, an unidentified 27-year-old woman was arrested in Terrigal and charged with importing steroids into Australia from Asia, and with smuggling steroids and other prohibited drugs into NSW jails for incarcerated B4L members.

On 21 April 2016, Bankstown B4L member Michael Odisho was found guilty of his role in the 9 February 2013 kneecapping of a fellow B4L member.

On 1 July 2016, Mohammed 'Little Crazy' Hamzy was found guilty of the manslaughter of Yehya Amood on 14 October 2012. A scheduling hearing was sentenced for 17 August 2016.

On 16 October 2016, Michael Odisho, 31, was sentenced to a minimum of 5 years and 8 months in prison, making him eligible for parole in November 2021. The evidence used to convict Odisho included cell tower records and fingerprint evidence, as well as testimony from the shooter himself, who had previously been identified as Faoud Ekermawi before he became an informant and his identity was concealed. The victim of the shooting, known as Witness A, stood up for Odisho at trial, recanting his previous testimony when he stated “Michael has got nothing to do with nothing".

On 27 October 2016, Mohammed 'Little Crazy' Hamzy was sentenced to 11 years and 6 months in jail, with a non-parole period of 8 years and 6 months, for the October 2012 manslaughter of fellow gang member Yehye Amood. With time served, Hamzy would be eligible for parole in February 2023. At trial, Hamzy had been found not guilty of his other charges, which stemmed from the shooting of Alex Ali.

In November 2016, the Quami brothers were all found guilty of their charges.

On 11 December 2016, The Daily Telegraph reported that after seven months of hearings, jurors were unable to reach unanimous verdicts in the cases of Mohammad Kalal and his co-defendant, who is listed under the cryptonym 'DD'. Kalal's charges related to the shooting of Zakaria's sister and the Chokolatte Cafe shooting, whereas 'DD' was accused of the murder of Mahmoud Hamzy. Whilst Kalal had admitted that he was involved in both incidents he was charged over, his lawyer argued that he had only committed the offences due to threats to his client's life by the Quami brothers. 'DD' on the other hand denied his charge, however, his defence was up against testimony to the contrary from two former members of the gang who had become government witnesses. Both Kalal and 'DD' were set to have their retrials scheduled for sometime in 2017.

On 16 June 2017, the Quami brothers were sentenced over their charges. Farhad Quami, 35, was sentenced to a maximum of 60 years with a non-parole period of 43 years; Mumtaz Quami, 32, was sentenced to a maximum of 50 years with a non-parole period of 36 years; and Jamil Quami, 25, was sentenced to a maximum of 30 years with a non-parole period of 21 years.

On 10 August 2017, The Daily Telegraph reported that Farhad Quami had been found with a mobile phone and steroids in a random strip-search by officers at Goulburn Correctional Centre.

In October 2018, B4L founder Bassam Hamzy got into a jailhouse brawl with Alameddine crime network member Talal Alameddine in Goulburn Correctional Centre.

On 1 February 2019, Mohammed Kalal, 33, was finally sentenced over his charges. Kalal had pled guilty years prior to three counts of shooting with intent to cause grievous bodily harm in relation to the shooting of Masood Zakaria's sister, and the Chokolatte cafe shooting, both in November 2013. Kalal was sentenced to a maximum of 10 years jail, with a non-parole period of 8 years, making him first eligible for parole in 2021. He was the final member of the B4L gang to be sentenced over the events of the Blacktown/Bankstown war.

On 20 May 2020, Farhad Quami stabbed convicted underworld hitman Abuzar Sultani multiple times in the TV room at Goulburn Correctional Centre.

== Other factions ==
=== Rumoured Queensland faction (2015) ===
On 13 January 2015, The Daily Telegraph reported that Brett 'Kaos' Pechey, the leader of the Brisbane faction of the Bandidos Motorcycle Club, had posted himself online sporting B4L-branded attire, and riding a B4L-branded motorcycle, whilst on the run from Queensland Police in Thailand. At the time, Pechey was wanted over two high-profile brawls, and over his involvement in an extortion racket. This sparked law enforcement concerns that the B4L gang was not only going interstate, but also international. The Bandidos had previously been aligned with Sydney's MBM gang, which had since been absorbed by B4L. Since both MBM and the Bandidos had been listed on Queensland's registry of 'banned gangs', police believed there seemed to be a clear opening for B4L to try and establish itself.

=== Illawarra faction (2017–2018) ===
In 2017, police became aware of a new faction of B4L on the rise, based in the Illawarra region of New South Wales, south of Sydney. The burgeoning faction was led by career-criminal Damien Featherstone, who had met Bassam Hamzy in the prison yard of Goulburn Supermax, and been inspired to convert to Islam and revitalise the gang in new territory. Unlike B4L's previous iterations, such as the Lebanese-Australian faction in Bankstown and the Afghan-Australian faction in Blacktown, the Illawarra chapter was made up of disadvantaged Indigenous Australian youth, all from broken homes who had been institutionalised from a young age, making them susceptible to the promise of brotherhood and purpose provided by Hamzy's radicalised version of Islam.

Throughout 2017, whilst still incarcerated, Featherstone made frequent jail calls directing his associates on the outside to traffic drugs, and stockpile weapons. One such associate was Richard Dutton, a fellow criminal who at the time was on parole for robbery charges. Dutton followed Featherstone's various instructions until one night when he travelled to Lake Illawarra Police Station, fired a single shot into the night sky with a .22 calibre rifle, and then walked into the headquarters and begged to be arrested.

Once Dutton was behind bars to serve a two-year sentence for the shooting, Featherstone allegedly 'unleashed him on the prison population', ordering targeted attacks on other inmates while he served his prison term. Unbeknownst to Featherstone, he had caught the attention of police already, and the calls he was making to the outside world were all being monitored. When Featherstone was paroled in late 2017, law enforcement tapped his phone within weeks. A principle motivation behind the activities of Featherstone's faction appeared to be the gang's animosity towards Troy Forniciari, the self-appointed leader of the Illawarra chapter of the Finks Motorcycle Club. Now that the rising crew's leader was out from behind bars, affirmative action against their rival was at the top of their to-do list.

In January 2018, when Featherstone's second-in-command Andrew 'Abdullah' Coe walked free from jail on parole, the plan to take down Forniciari was properly set in motion. Featherstone and Coe began plotting ways to take him out, including a plan to lure him out of the Finks' North Wollongong clubhouse and assassinate him in Wollongong's CBD.

On 28 January 2018, the plan almost came to fruition, however, it was halted when Coe's vehicle got a flat tyre.

On 1 February 2018, police preemptively swooped on Troy Forniciari, charging him with affray, possession of an unauthorised firearm, and dealing with proceeds of crime. Upon his arrest, Forniciari 'immediately disclosed his predicament' to police, telling them that he was the subject of a B4L murder contract and that he wouldn't survive his time incarcerated. Forniciari wound up serving 2.5 years for his offences.

On the same day as Forniciari's arrest, police also raided the home of Damien Featherstone, uncovering two hidden firearms, however Featherstone had gotten wind of the impending raid and had already fled to Canberra.

On 2 February 2018, Andrew 'Abdullah' Coe was arrested. He eventually pled guilty to a charge of conspiring to discharge a firearm with intent to cause grievous bodily harm, and was sentenced to just over five years behind bars.

Within a month of Featherstone's escape, he was arrested in Canberra on serious break-in charges. Featherstone went on to serve five years for these offences.

In early 2023, upon finishing his break-in sentence in the ACT, Featherstone was extradited to New South Wales to face his charges related to B4L's Illawarra faction.

In September 2023, Damien Featherstone pled guilty to charges of conspiring to discharge a firearm causing grievous bodily harm, drug supply and knowingly directing a criminal group.

=== Melbourne and Adelaide factions (2024–present) ===
In May 2024, former Mongols Motorcycle Club bikie Sam 'The Punisher' Abdulrahim was pictured on holiday with Mohammed 'Little Crazy' Hamzy, accompanied by rumours that Abdulrahim was set to lead the B4L gang's revival in his home state of Victoria. This news came concurrent with the revelation that the gang was also spreading to Adelaide in South Australia. In both regions, new recruits were said to be made up of ex-bikies, as well as Middle-Eastern organised crime figures.

On 24 May 2024, gunmen ambushed Sam 'The Punisher' Abdulrahim outside his home in Thomastown, missing him with seventeen shots before he managed to fight off his attackers and escape in his car. Abdulrahim then drove to his parents' home in Brunswick, where accomplices of his would-be assassins had torched their vehicles in order to lure him out of his house. Abdulrahim had survived a previous attempt on his life in 2022, when he was shot eight times in the chest as he left his cousin's funeral. In the interim, four businesses connected to Abdulrahim had been firebombed as Victoria's illicit tobacco wars escalated.

On 3 October 2024, a 49 year old associate of Sam Abdulrahim was shot on Denys Street in Fawkner.

On 18 December 2024, The Daily Telegraph released an article detailing a bizarre jail call between an accused Melbourne gunman, and an unknown associate of the Alameddine crime network, demonstrating that tensions between the crews were ongoing and had even gone interstate. Throughout the call, it became clear that the inmate had supposedly caused offence to Alameddine associate Ali 'Ay Huncho' Younes, and he was thus demanded to denounce the B4L gang, which he was a member of, several times.

On 28 January 2025, Melbourne B4L leader Sam 'The Punisher' Abdulrahim was shot to death in front of his girlfriend at his apartment building on High Street in Preston. Abdulrahim had supposedly only been living there for between 24 and 48 hours at the time of his death.

== 2020 shooting ==
Mejid Hamzy, younger brother of Bassam Hamzy, was killed during what police believe was a targeted daylight shooting in Condell Park on 19 October 2020.

== 2021 shootings ==
On 17 June in Sydney CBD at about 10:25pm, Bilal Hamze was killed in a drive-by shooting on Bridge Street near Mr Wongs restaurant. It was reported that the gunman fled the scene in a dark-coloured Audi.

On 20 October in Guildford, Sydney, at about 8:55am, Salim Hamze and Toufik Hamze were killed in a double shooting on Osgood Street.

== Known members and associates ==
=== B4L Bankstown faction (2008-2013) ===
- Mohammed 'Little Crazy' Hamzy (jailed, 2013)
- Khaled Hamzy (jailed, 2008)
- Ghassan Amoun (murdered, 2022)
- Michael Odisho (jailed, 2013)
- Bilal Hamze (murdered, 2021)
- Mahmoud Hamzy (murdered, 2013)
- Khaled Hamzy jr. (jailed, 2008)
- Mohammed Abbas (jailed, 2008)
- Thomas Miholic (jailed, 2008)
- Khaled Kahwaji (murdered, 2013)
- Masood Zakaria
- Faoud Ekermawi (jailed, 2013; became informant, 2014)
- Omar Ajaj (jailed, 2013)
- Mahmoud Sanoussi (jailed, 2013)
- Abdul Abu-Mahmoud
- Ahmed Hoblos
- 'Witness A' (became informant, 2013)

=== B4L Blacktown faction (2012-2014) ===
- Farhad Quami (jailed, 2014)
- Mumtaz Quami (jailed, 2014)
- Jamil Quami (jailed, 2013)
- Bassim Hijazi (jailed, 2013)
- Yehya Amood (murdered, 2012)
- Amanda Crowe (jailed, 2014)
- Fazal Bari
- Fawad Bari (jailed, 2014)
- Navid Khalili (jailed, 2014)
- Mohammad Kalal (jailed, 2013)
- Sarkhel Rokhzayi (jailed, 2013)
- Mobin Merzaei (jailed, 2013)
- Wahed Karimi (jailed, 2013)
- Kasim Ali Khan (jailed, 2014)
- Nazir Akbari (jailed, 2014)

=== B4L Queensland faction (2015) ===
- Brett 'Kaos' Pechey

Note: The existence of this faction was never confirmed.

=== B4L Illawarra faction (2017-2018) ===
- Damien Featherstone (jailed, 2018)
- Andrew 'Abdullah' Coe (jailed, 2018)
- Richard Dutton (jailed, 2017)

=== B4L Melbourne faction (2024-Present) ===
- Sam 'The Punisher' Abdulrahim (murdered, 2025)
