= Alameddine =

Alameddine is an Arabic surname. The surname Alameddine has its origins in Lebanon and carries the meaning of "religious banner" or "flag of religion."

== Groups ==
- Alameddine crime network, an organized crime group in Sydney, Australia
- Alameddine dynasty, a Yaman Sunni clan from Lebanon and Syria that at some time held Emir status during the Ottoman empire.

== People ==
- Hachem Alameddine, Lebanese politician and MP in the 2009–17 Lebanese Parliament
- Rabih Alameddine (born 1959), Lebanese-American painter and writer
