= Michael Odisho =

Australian gangster

- Other names: Mike, Michael Cohen, Nicholas Papageorgio
- Occupation: Underworld Crime Figure
- Status: Imprisoned
- Allegiance: DLASTHR (formerly); Brothers for Life (formerly)
- Conviction: Shooting Involvement
- Penalty: 5 years imprisonment

Michael Odisho is an Assyrian-Australian underworld figure and former member of the DLASTHR and Brothers for Life (BFL) organized crime gangs which operated in Sydney, Australia. He was featured on Australian current affairs program ABC Television 7.30 giving access into his former gang life. In 2016 he was found guilty of a shooting involvement where he was sentenced up to 5 years in prison.

== Gang affiliations ==
Odisho was named at the inquest into the shooting death of Ramon Khananyah at a Fairfield, New South Wales café in November 2005. Police believed the shooting was linked to DLASTHR (The Last Hour) who Odisho was a member of. Khananyah was killed and three others wounded when three gunmen peppered the Babylon Café in the Civic Centre Arcade, Fairfield, with at least 15 bullets.

At a 2011 inquest into the death of Khananyah, Mr MacMahon said the evidence against the key police suspects was "cogent" - but not strong enough for a jury to convict them. He referred the case back to the homicide squad. No one has been charged with the murder.

At the time of the murder, Odisho was 18 years old and a member of a Fairfield gang which he said he had become involved in while still at school.

"It wasn't a gang scene," he told ABC in a short documentary he was featured on.

"We were school kids; we grew up together; later it developed into a gang sort of thing."

"I know what it looks in the public's eyes and I don't disagree with that, but when you're actually in it and you've grown up from school, it doesn't seem like a gang." Odisho has beaten every serious charged laid against him since the shooting and won a payout for a malicious prosecution.

=== Brothers for Life (BFL) ===
While in prison, under charges later dropped, Odisho made new friends who were associates of the Brothers for Life (BFL) gang. When he was released from prison he became the only Christian member of the group. Odisho was a senior figure of the Parramatta Chapter. In 2012, a power struggle between the founders of BFL and the gang's rival members trying to seize control of its A$250,000 a week drug operation erupted into open war.

=== Winston Hills shooting ===
On November 3, 2013, Odisho was gunned down at his home in Winston Hills, NSW. He sustained six gunshot wounds to his arms and thighs and was transported to hospital, where he underwent surgery and survived. Police suspected the shooting was linked to an internal conflict within the criminal gang. Odisho's shooting came just days after fellow gang member Mahmoud Hamzy, 25, was shot dead by three gunmen inside the garage of his home at Revesby Heights. Two members of the gang were subsequently charged in connection with the shooting of Odisho. Jamil and Mumtaz Qaumi faced charges after NSW Police disrupted the gang’s activities in 2014, leading to the arrest of a number of prominent members.

=== Imprisonment ===
On 9 February 2013, a member of the BFL gang presented to hospital with two gunshot wounds to his thigh after being shot by associates within the group. He later began cooperating with police, providing information about the gang’s activities while wearing a covert listening device. This cooperation enabled investigators to gather sufficient evidence to arrest two individuals. Odisho and another suspect, who was later granted immunity, were detained and questioned in relation to the shooting.

Prosecutors alleged that cell tower data and fingerprint evidence linked Odisho to the incident, claiming he loaded the firearm and handed it to the gunman while they were seated in a vehicle in Bass Hill. The alleged shooter later gave evidence in court that supported aspects of this account.

Odisho found an unlikely ally in his victim. Unable to be identified, the man surprised the NSW District Court by saying Odisho wasn't involved in the incident, backflipping on earlier statements.

The trial had been told the person responsible for firing the weapon had been granted immunity.

“Michael has got nothing to do with nothing,” the victim told the court.

Despite his support, the jury found Odisho guilty of wounding with intent to cause grievous bodily harm and using a pistol without authorisation.

Judge David Arnott sentenced Odisho to at least three years in prison on the pistol charge and a minimum five years and eight months over the shooting itself.

=== Witness bribe ===
In March 2020, Michael Odisho and Ahmed Hoblos were accused of allegedly arranging a $25,000 agreement intended to secure a witness’s non-attendance at court. It was also alleged that Odisho claimed to have difficulty remembering events after being admitted to hospital for head knocks, although court proceedings suggested he had only presented with a shoulder injury.

The Crown alleged that the two men were involved in facilitating communications between the accused and the victim of a gang-related shooting in an attempt to influence the witness’s testimony. Both men gave evidence in the Downing Centre District Court during the trial of Michael Odisho, who is charged with two counts of perverting the course of justice, and told the court they could not recall how they came to pass messages between the parties.

The Crown alleged Odisho used the men, and others, to facilitate payment to a shooting victim who was due to take the stand in the 2016 trial over the incident.

On 5 March 2021, after a seven-year delay caused by COVID-19disruptions to court proceedings, Michael Odisho and an associate were convicted and sentenced to jail for perverting the course of justice. The court found they had falsified evidence relating to a cocaine-related shooting case in 2016.

=== Insurance claim ===
On 27 September 2012, Odisho and his mother left their Winston Hills home about 10pm. Odisho alleged that when he returned home two-and-a-half hours later, the house had been ransacked and his Porsche Cayenne Turbo had been stolen, along with $3,000 in cash.

The court heard police at the time found "no signs of forced entry". It was claimed the alleged thieves stole a set of keys, took the money and drove off in the luxury car.

Odisho's Porsche vanished two and a half months after the car was purchased for $59,990 and was shortly after insured for $126,490.

Judge John Hatzistergos said on the evidence presented he "could not be sure" of the ownership of the vehicle, despite it being registered in Odisho's name, and it was "impossible to reconcile" if the inheritance Odisho used to purchase the vehicle existed. Odisho was unemployed at the time of the purchase. On 1 September 2015, Odisho lost a bid to convince the insurance company to pay him $126,000 for the Porsche.

=== ABC documentary ===
While awaiting trial over the shooting of a BFL member, Odisho was featured on the Australian current affairs program 7.30, where he discussed aspects of his life from his teenage years onwards.

He is extensively tattooed, with several designs referencing law enforcement and rival investigative units, including the acronyms “MEOC” and “POI” (person of interest) inked on his knuckles, referring to the Middle Eastern Organised Crime Squad. On his neck is the phrase “We trust in God but just in case, keep one loaded,” and his back features an image of a submachine gun beneath the word “Retaliation”.

In the documentary segment, Odisho explained the meaning of his tattoos and also spoke about a previous shooting in which he was injured, as well as the criminal proceedings he was facing at the time.
