= Alameddine crime network =

Australian organised crime group

- Founding location: Merrylands, Western Sydney
- Years active: 2010s–present
- Territory: Sydney, New South Wales, Australia
- Ethnicity: Middle Eastern (mostly Lebanese Arab Australians)
- Membership (est.): Unknown
- Leader: Rafat Alameddine
- Criminal activities: Drug trafficking, extortion, money laundering, drive-by shootings, armed robbery, contract killings, murder, assault, kidnapping, alleged support for Islamic terrorism
- Rivals: Brothers for Life

The Alameddine crime network or Alameddine family is an Australian organised crime group that operates out of the Western Sydney suburb of Merrylands. The gang, led by Rafat Alameddine, is allegedly one of the biggest drug-trafficking organisations in Sydney, with New South Wales Police declaring the organisation to have reportedly earned around $1 million in weekly profit at its peak.

Since October 2020, the Alameddines have grown to public notoriety in connection to an extended feud they became involved in with the Hamzy/Hamze crime family, the most dominant faction of the Brothers for Life organisation, within the Sydney gangland war of the early 2020s.

== Connection to the Curtis Cheng murder and links to Islamic extremism ==
In October 2015, Talal Alameddine, who was accused of supplying the firearm used in the fatal shooting of NSW Police accountant Curtis Cheng, was denied bail and scheduled to appear in court on 10 December of that year. His co-accused, Raban Alou, who was also charged in connection with the attack, remained in custody and faced the possibility of life imprisonment if convicted.

In connection with the 2015 shooting of Cheng, Rafat Alameddine's brother Talal pleaded guilty to "recklessly possessing a thing connected with a terrorist act and supplying a pistol" in October 2017. In May 2018, Talal was sentenced by Judge Peter Johnson in the Supreme Court of New South Wales to 17 years and 8 months, with a minimum term of 13½ years. His earliest projected release date is in 2029.

During legal proceedings, Talal Alameddine implied the network having a connection to the Islamic State (ISIS) militant group, saying to officials: "my beard is for ISIS".

A 2015 police report declared that Bilal Alameddine, then between 16 and 17 years of age, had attempted to fly to the Middle East to make his way to Syria to join ISIS. Bilal denied allegations that the trip was connected to the Islamic State and said he was going to North Macedonia on holiday.

Alameddine member and associate Samimjan Azari is also reportedly related to Omarjan Azari, one of 19 men who were charged in 2014 with planning a mass beheading terrorist attack. Samimjan Azari was also on the list of many individuals that alleged Islamic State terrorist Ahmad Saiyer Naizman was banned from contacting.

On 11 December 2017, Mark Morri of The Daily Telegraph reported that terrorist Man Haron Monis had purchased the shotgun used in the Lindt Cafe siege from a "well-known Middle Eastern crime family" 48 hours before the attack. Morri confirmed that the Alameddines were "not alleged to have sold the gun to Monis," though it remains likely that one of the Alameddines' allies may have, such as, potentially, the Hauochar Clan. However, police declared that while they received extensive intelligence regarding the weapon transaction, they were unable to materialise charges about the event.

Alameddine's long-time allies, the Hauochars, have also been linked to alleged extremist activity. In 2015, Osman Hauochar travelled to the Syria-Turkey border, where he claimed to have been doing “humanitarian work.” He was questioned by officials upon his return to Australia.

After the arrests of the Alameddine family's R4W subset, the New South Wales Police Force alleged links between the gang and Islamic extremism. On 25 May 2022, The Daily Telegraph reported that court papers identified "members of the group downloading and watching promotional videos produced by the Islamic State of Iraq and Syria (ISIS) that encourage terrorist acts and violent extremism.”

== Counter-terror police sting ==
From May to June 2017, an undercover police operation was commenced by the counter-terrorism unit targeting illicit weapons and drug supply. An undercover police officer, dubbed 'M' in court documents, met with Bilal Alameddine and Samimjan Azari on five occasions. Across these get-togethers, Azari and Alameddine supplied officer 'M' with "seven firearms, including a shotgun, bolt-action rifle, lever-action rifle, and 507 grams of cocaine".

On the first meeting between the men and the undercover officer, which occurred on 5 May 2017, Alameddine and Azari met 'M' on a street in Guildford. Alameddine then got into the backseat of 'M's vehicle and brandished a .50 AE Desert Eagle pistol from his pants, alongside two empty boxes of ammunition. 'M' reportedly paid the men $28,000 in cash in this transaction. On a later occasion, Azari supplied Officer 'M' with $32,000 worth of cocaine, which was allegedly packaged in “vacuum-sealed plastic packets.”

On 30 June 2017, the New South Wales Police Force swooped on the pair at a Bunnings carpark in Lidcombe and seized BlackBerry mobile phones, 283 grams of cocaine, and about $70,000 in cash. A further $51,840, suspected by police to be the proceeds of crime, were later seized from Azari's residence in Merrylands.

At the time of their alleged offense, Bilal Alameddine and Samimjan Azari were both only 18 years of age. As of an article published in The Daily Telegraph on 15 May 2020, Alameddine and Azari had both pleaded guilty to unlawfully supplying firearms and supplying about 500 grams of cocaine. Alameddine then also pleaded guilty to "supplying ammunition and two counts of supplying a pistol part" on 12 May 2020. Azari also pleaded guilty to "six form-one offences relating to the unauthorised supply of pistol parts, ammunition, and the MDMA and cash found in his home".

As of the 15 May 2020 article, Bilal Alameddine was represented by lawyer Peter Lange. While awaiting sentencing, Alameddine was in confinement at Long Bay Correctional Centre. Alameddine, whose date of birth was listed in court filings as 4 September 1998, was sentenced to "an aggregate sentence of 6 years from 30 June 2017 to 29 June 2023 with an aggregate non-parole period of 3 years expiring on 29 June 2020".

In 2020 and 2021, Bilal Alameddine was refused early release by the State Parole Authority.

On 11 August 2021, The Sydney Morning Herald published an article that identified solicitor Abdulrahim 'Abdul' Saddik as the head of Bilal's legal team, and Tomislav Bicanic as his barrister. Abdul Saddik also represents many other members of the Alameddine clan, including Trente Jeske, Ali 'Ay Huncho' Younes and Asaad Alahmad, as well as Talal, Hamdi, and family boss Rafat.

On 14 November 2022, The Daily Telegraph reported that Bilal Alameddine was set to be released from jail on parole within "a matter of weeks".

Azari's sentencing in this case is unclear based on online sources, though it is known that he was at least out of prison as early as June 2023, when he was involved in a public brawl at Pitt Street Mall with other senior Alameddine clan members.

== Brothers for Life infighting ==
In mid-to-late 2013, the Brothers for Life gang was in civil war, with the Lebanese Bankstown chapter and the Afghan Blacktown chapter engaging in tit-for-tat shootings. As reported by The Daily Telegraph in November 2016, Masood Zakaria, despite being Afghan himself, was a member of B4L's Bankstown crew at the time of the conflict. The faction of Brothers for Life which Masood was part of was led by Mohammad "Little Crazy" Hamzy, a member of the crime family he would soon be at war against.

During the conflict with the Blacktown chapter, on 4 November 2013, Zakaria's then 14-year-old sister was struck with 300 shotgun pellets to her spine, lungs, and chest and suffered life-altering injuries. According to The Daily Telegraph, Zakaria also used to be a lieutenant in the Comanchero Motorcycle Club under former sergeant-at-arms Tarek Zahed.

Sometime in October 2018, Talal Alameddine got into a brawl with fellow Goulburn Correctional Centre inmate Bassam Hamzy, founder of the Brothers for Life organisation.

On 15 June 2019, Rafat, Richad, and Hamdi Alameddine were involved in a brawl at Westfield Parramatta with another group known to them at around three o'clock in the afternoon. The trio turned themselves in at Parramatta Police Station on the morning of 22 July, a little more than a month after the melee. They were charged with affray.

== Known business links ==
In December 2016, Masood Zakaria registered property management company, Prestige Management Group with ASIC, who deregistered the business in 2020 on grounds the company was "either inactive or hadn't filed appropriate documents with corporate regulators on time". However, Zakaria had registered another, separate property management company, Zak Projects, in 2018.

The wife of Ali 'Ay Huncho' Younes, Ezzat Alameddine, had reported involvement in Zak Projects, with Zakaria, and was listed as a director of the since-delisted Prestige Management Group. Ezzat Alameddine was arrested on 15 December 2021 during a police search for Zakaria, and, as of 6 February 2022, was facing charges for alleged use of fraudulent documents in the purchase of her home.

In June 2017, Hamdi Alameddine registered a tree lopping company, operating from a Alameddine family home in Merrylands.

In July 2018, Jihad Alameddine registered a building management firm, Fastway Project Management. It was deregistered by ASIC in July 2021.

In 2018, Rafat Alameddine registered investment company, Australian Investment Managers. ASIC deregistered the company in September 2021. As of a The Daily Telegraph article published on 5 February 2022, Rafat had registered a new company, MSJ Group.

Alameddine family associate Mohammad 'Almo' Alameddine was served a ban from associating with a list of 24 specific underworld figures.The list included Elly Greenfield, a 30 year old (at the time of reporting in August 2022) businessperson who had attracted media coverage for her links to reputed underworld figure, Luke 'Fat Boy' Sparos. Greenfield was reported to have provided Sparos with a $100,000 surety on his bail application for charges related to the attempted murder of DLASTHR gangster, Samer Marcus, in November 2020.

The extent to which Greenfield was involved in underworld activities was uncertain. Listed as the sole director of car-hire company, Unique Wedding Cars and Limousines, she was alleged to have links to discount carpet seller and bookmaker, Leo Lewin - a fellow business owner, residing in the upmarket South-Sydney suburb of Yowie Bay, and former operator of the Fairfield-based tyre-shop franchise, Tyres for Less.

In 2017, the decision was taken by horse-racing association, Racing NSW, to revoke Lewin's bookmaking license following allegations he had "demonstrated association with known violent criminals/persons of extreme ill repute”. Racing NSW also claimed Lewin had provided known crime figures with employment, vehicles, properties and home-improvement services (namely, carpet), and had “offer[ed] accommodation at [his] family residence to a criminal on parole”.

The Alameddine family is known to have ties to several junior Rugby League clubs in Western Sydney, after reports extended-family members were coaching a number of teams in the local Parramatta competition. In 2022, Hamdi Alameddine was pictured at a junior football match attended by Penrith Panthers coach, Ivan Cleary, and his son, and Panthers' star halfback, Nathan.

On 24 January 2023, The Daily Telegraph reported New South Wales Police Force Strike Force Sugarcane - established to target Alameddine subsidiary, R4W - had centred their attention on businesses and properties in the immediate vicinity of a phone store, MobileTown, in Granville. Raids carried out at the store led to the arrest of MobileTown owner/manager, Nou Silena Loeung, who was charged with 27 separate offences. Police allege Loeung had facilitated the operations of R4W's drug distribution "business" through sales of thousands of fraudulent SIM cards to members of the organisation.

On 27 May 2022, Rafat Alameddine lodged paperwork to register a new business, Sydney Lavish Renovations.

== Links to Rugby League ==
On 20 May 2016, Alameddine family members Rafat, Jihad and Richad Alameddine, as well as Former Nomads bikie Paul Younan, were photographed dining at the Golden Century Chinese Restaurant at The Star, Sydney with National Rugby League star-players James Segeyaro, Corey Norman, and Junior Paulo. Parramatta Eels players Corey Norman and Junior Paulo, along with Penrith Panthers player James Segeyaro, received police warnings for consorting with criminals following this encounter.

Fellow National Rugby League star Beau Ryan was also videoed with members of the group. Ryan claimed to have just run into the men whilst he was dining there separately and claimed he didn't have prior knowledge of their criminal associations. Paul Younan was arrested for the 2009 Gold Coast murder of Omega Ruston in February 2022.

On 18 August 2022, The Daily Telegraph reported that "The Alameddine clan is known to have deep ties to junior Rugby League with relatives coaching several sides in the local Parramatta competition" after Hamdi Alameddine was pictured at a junior football event. Nathan and Ivan Cleary were also pictured in attendance at the same match.

National Rugby League player Jason Saab, a winger for the Manly-Warringah Sea Eagles, attended the funeral of Alameddine family gangster Murat Gulasi in 2022. Jason may be related to Sydney underworld figure Mohammad Saab, who survived a shooting in Turrella in August 2020. Mohammad was one of the 24 underworld figures who Mohammad 'Almo' Alameddine was banned from associating with by the New South Wales Police Force.

== History with the Hamzy, Elmir and Ahmad clans ==
=== Marital ties with the Hamzy family ===
Tensions between the Alameddine and Hamzy families date back as far as the 1990s, when Mejida Hamzy chose to marry into the Alameddine family against her father Khaled's wishes. Mejida was the older sister of siblings Bassam, Mejid and Ghassan (Amoun). Hamzy family members, such as Bassam, reportedly refused to attend. In particular, Khaled Hamzy was strongly against the union. He was imprisoned at the time.

Mejida remains married into the Alameddine family, and she is reportedly the only inner-member of the Alameddines which her relatives subjected to a 'Serious Crime Prevention Order' (SCPO) can speak to. Not much is known of her, other than that she frequents the Hamzy family home in Auburn, and that she had shared a strong bond with her younger brother Mejid.

=== Links with 2016–2017 gang war: Elmirs, Ahmads and Hamzys ===
In 2016, Sydney erupted into gang war with two other notorious families at the centre, the Elmirs and the Ahmads. The war began when Safwan Charbaji, a relative of Steven Elmir, was shot to death at a smash-repair shop by Walid 'Wally' Ahmad in April 2016. Walid was murdered later in April in Bankstown, with responsibility for his assassination being claimed by Elmir associate Hamad Assad. Assad was murdered on 25 October. Mejid Hamzy was the key suspect in his murder.

On 10 March 2017, the final death the New South Wales Police Force believe to be linked to this feud was that of Kemel 'Blackie' Barakat, a Hells Angels associate who worked as an enforcer for the Ahmad Family. On March 28, Emed Sleiman, who was previously convicted of murdering innocent man Jason Burton in 1997, was shot in the chest and leg in Auburn. The Daily Telegraph reported that Sleiman was suspected of killing Barakat, and that he had allegedly directly texted Frank Criniti, then-owner of the since-bust Crinitis restaurant chain, on the night of the murder to book a table- which he then lied about in court. Safwan Charbaji was an associate of relatives in the Alameddine Clan. Walid 'Wally' Ahmad was a known associate of the Hamzys.

Hamad Assad, a self-branded 'executioner' for the Elmirs, was suspected of being behind the 2013 shooting of Brothers for Life founder Bassam Hamzy's aunt Maha Hamze, allegedly in conjunction with infamous Sydney criminal Reynold Glover. Glover, who is now imprisoned for life, was a close friend of Bilal Hauochar. At the time of the shooting against Maha, Bilal Hauochar was a close friend of the Alameddines. The shooting of Hamze, who was Bilal Hamze's mother, was in retaliation for a scrapped debt-collection job which Reynold Glover had organised Bilal (Hamze) to complete through talks with Bassam Hamzy, a fellow inmate he was friendly with at Goulburn Correctional Centre.

When the $20,000 job was cancelled by Glover, Bilal (Hamze), still wishing to be paid, decided to recoup some of the money he had lost by extorting Glover's mother for $5,000. This then provoked Glover to shoot Maha when he was out of prison, thereby souring his relationship with Bassam from then onwards. Despite the Hamzy Clan's relationship with the Ahmad Family, and the fact that the Ahmads were responsible for killing Alameddine associate Charbaji, The Sydney Morning Herald reported that in April 2021, Bilal Alameddine wrote a friendly letter to Mahmoud 'Brownie' Ahmad. Mahmoud himself was in prison at the time serving a manslaughter charge in connection with the Charbaji murder.

On 28 March 2022, The Daily Telegraph published an article stating that Masood Zakaria's escape from Sydney to Turkey, via Perth and Malaysia, was facilitated by Fawaz Elmir, who was based in Lebanon at the time, at a cost of between $500,000 and $750,000. This suggests that the Alameddines and Elmirs are still allies.

=== The 2022 Comanchero–Ahmad skirmish ===
In 2022, The Comanchero Motorcycle Club, who were close allies and business partners of the Alameddines through Mohammad 'Almo' Alameddine, and the Ahmads, close allies of the Hamzys, were involved in a 2-and-a-half week spat of shootings that saw three high-profile murders. Mahmoud 'Brownie' Ahmad was murdered after a wild few months out of jail on 27 April 2022.

On 10 May 2022, a high-profile double shooting grievously injured Comanchero Motorcycle Club sergeant-at-arms Tarek Zahed, and killed his gangster-brother Omar. On 14 May 2022, Mahmoud's nephew Rami Iskander, a suspect in the Zahed murder, was murdered in Belmore.

Prior to these shootings, in January 2022, The Daily Telegraph reported that the Alameddine crime network had planned to assassinate Mahmoud 'Brownie' Ahmad at a park in Rushcutters Bay in October 2021. Ahmad was formally warned about the murder plot before it was able to take place, causing him to travel to the Middle East soon after.

On 23 February 2023, a TikTok video published by The Daily Telegraph (Sydney) stated that high-profile gangsters Youssef 'Gags' Ahmad and Mohammad 'Little Crazy' Hamzy had both been denied parole, with the New South Wales Police Force suspecting that the two would form an alliance with one another if freed, suggesting that the friendliness between Bilal Alameddine and the Ahmads had, at latest, came to an end by then- if it hadn't already years prior.

== Alameddine–Hamzy war (2020–2022) ==
On 9 June 2020, the home of Alameddine associate Shaylin Zreika was shot up in a drive-by shooting in Westmead. It is unclear whether this shooting was related to any tensions with the Hamzys.

On 14 October 2020, members of the Hamze/Hamzy crime family began attempting to standover Alameddine associate Shaylin Zreika. A police affidavit declared that Ibrahem Hamze, Tareek Hamze and Haysem Hamze attacked Zreika with a metal pole in Sefton, and then stole his mobile phone.

On 16 October 2020, an unidentified member of the Alameddine network was robbed of drugs by members of the Hamze/Hamzy crime family. Around the same time period, 400kg of cocaine had also been stolen from Sydney-based members of the Comanchero Motorcycle Club, who at the time were allied with the Alameddines. Mejid Hamzy was suspected of orchestrating the drug-rip.

On 17 October 2020, the Auburn home of Maha Hamze and other members of the Hamze/Hamzy family was peppered with bullets in a drive-by shooting. Maha Hamze, the matriarch of the family, is not thought to be involved in the family business.

On 19 October 2020, at 12:35am, Rafat Alameddine's house was shot up in Merrylands.

On 19 October 2020, at 7:34am, almost exactly seven hours later, Mejid Hamzy was shot to death outside his home in Condell Park by Alameddine associates. This was the first murder of the Hamzy/Alameddine conflict.

On 23 October 2020, Mohammed 'Little Crazy' Hamzy was stabbed three times by Mouhammed Houri in John Moroney Correctional Complex, where he was serving a sentence for manslaughter related to a 2012 shooting murder.

On 23 November 2020, a 17-year-old associate of the Alameddine family was shot in South Granville.

On 8 December 2020, the New South Wales Police Force made an application to the Supreme Court of New South Wales to have Serious Crime Prevention Orders (SCPOs) enforced against the members of Hamzy and Alameddine families.

On 30 January 2021, Fire & Rescue New South Wales were called to extinguish a car-fire on Hume Road in Smithfield. As they tended to the blaze, 22 year old Alameddine associate Mejed Derbas was discovered shot-to-death inside the vehicle. Derbas was allegedly a "mid-level drug dealer" in the organisation, and was killed supposedly because of ongoing internal conflict.

On 30 January 2021, innocent father Mustafa Namaan was shot to death in Hurstville in a fatal case of mistaken identity. Police believe Namaan was murdered by associates of the Alameddine family who mistook Namaan for Ibrahem Hamze.

On 6 February 2021, a violent brawl broke out between Alameddine network associates John Ray Bayssari and Dagher Ghamrawi and Hamzy family associates Ghassan Amoun and Rodrigo Henriquez at Ballina Airport.

On 7 February 2021, Alameddine associate Mohamad Obeid opened fire at a park in South Granville. After the random shooting, Obeid drove "wildly" around Sydney before verbally threatening a police officer, punching him in the head, and pulling a knife on him in Padstow. Obeid then fled the scene when witnesses intervened.

On 8 February 2021, within 24 hours of Obeid's tirade, police raided his mother's home, where they uncovered "three guns, 896 rounds of ammunition, a taser, 11 knives and more than $46,000 in cash", as well as 207g of cocaine. Police charged both Mohamad Obeid and his younger brother Noah over the contents they seized.

On 15 February 2021, Maha Hamze's unit block was shot up by Alameddine associates for the second time, with a stray bullet narrowly missing a nurse at nearby Auburn Hospital.

On 12 March 2021, the home of Asaad Alahmad, Rafat Alameddine's brother-in-law, was shot up in Guildford.

On 15 March 2021, Ali 'Ay Huncho' Younes, Richad Alameddine and Mohammed Zreika pled guilty to affray charges dating back to a February 2020 brawl at Flamingo Lounge in Potts Point. The melee was not related to conflict with the Hamzy family.

On 8 June 2021, Assad Alahmad was shot in the neck in Guildford. At the time, the New South Wales Police Force did not believe this shooting was part of the ongoing Hamzy/Alameddine feud. However, a report published on 27 November 2023 by well-known The Daily Telegraph crime reporter Josh Hanrahan declared that Salim Hamze was responsible for the Alahmad shooting.

On 17 June 2021, prominent Hamze/Hamzy crime family member Bilal Hamze, who had previously attempted to be a peacekeeper between the crews, was shot to death on Bridge Street in the Sydney central business district after leaving the Kid Kyoto restaurant, which is owned by Sam Prince.

On 14 July 2021, Alameddine associates Ezzaddine and Mohammad Omar were arrested for the Mejid Hamzy murder.

On 6 August 2021, Alameddine associate Shady Kanj, 22, was shot to death in Chester Hill. In an article published on 27 November 2023, The Daily Telegraph reported that Kanj was murdered by Salim Hamze. Before the murder, a text had been sent to Kanj asking for a delivery of cocaine to Boundary Road in Chester Hill. When Kanj arrived, accompanied by fellow associate Wessam El Jajieh, a group of four men approached his vehicle, and Kanj was shot to death. Once Kanj was shot, Jajieh sped away from the scene, with Hamze continuing fire as he made his escape. A total of 13 shots were fired. Whilst Hamze fired at Jajieh, a stray bullet struck innocent bystander Ramadan Osman in the head a few hundred metres away.

On 14 August 2021, two armed and masked men in a stolen Mercedes were pulled over and arrested in North Sydney, and charged with conspiring to murder alleged Hamzy/Hamze Crime Family boss Ibrahem Hamze. As of March 24, 2022, three men were charged in connection to the foiled murder plot. These men were Samuel John Rokomaqisa, Joseph 'Jo Fresh' Vokai, and an unnamed 19 year old. Police sources stated that Vokai was viewed as the leader of the infamous Islander gang KVT, who have regularly been used as muscle by the Alameddines.

On 3 September 2021, Salim Hamze shot at a car containing Asaad Alahmad, Adam Achrafi, and Khodar Hamad in Granville.

On 24 September 2021, five alleged members and associates of the Alameddine crime network were arrested after a brawl with police at a petrol station on Guildford Road in Guildford. The melee was alleged to have started after the group was approached by officers who had noticed they weren't wearing face masks, which was a breach of COVID-19 safety protocols. The arrested men were Noah Obeid, 19; Hussein Zraika, 22; Khalid Zreika, 21; Fadi Zreika, early 20s; and an unidentified 20-year-old man.

On 20 October 2021, Salim Hamze, 18, and his innocent father Toufik, 64, were shot to death while they sat in a car outside their Guildford home. Salim and Toufik were the 3rd and 4th members of the Hamzy Family to die within a year.

On 10 November 2021, Alameddine/R4W member Bilal Mahfoud was shot at while he sat on the front patio of his Guildford home.

On 29 November 2021, Alameddine associate Murat Gulasi was shot in the leg outside a gym in Prospect. High-ranking Alameddine members Mohammed Salim Noorzai and Murat Gulasi managed to escape uninjured. Fiti Ah-Cheung and Joseph 'Freddy14' Howard were charged over the shooting, along with crime boss Ibrahem Hamze. Ah-Cheung is an associate of the 'RFA' (Ready For Anything) street gang, which is strongly linked to the Mount Druitt street gang Onefour that Howard is a member of. The victim of the shooting, Murat Gulasi, later died of unrelated causes at a gym in Istanbul shortly after fleeing the country.

On 8 December 2021, the home of Omar Zakaria, Masood Zakaria's father, was raided by police who were seeking to target Masood's 'ill-gotten gains'. According to The Daily Telegraph, "officers uncovered $200,000 in cash, 30 pieces of jewellery and 210 precious gemstones during the search". Omar was charged with two counts of dealing with proceeds of crime and one count of having suspected unlawfully obtained goods in his custody.

On 29 December 2021, KVT leader Joseph 'Jo Fresh' Vokai turned himself into police after a warrant was issued for his arrest in connection to the foiled assassination plot against Ibrahem Hamze in August.

On 6 January 2022, Ghassan Amoun, the brother of Mejid Hamzy and imprisoned Hamzy family founder Bassam Hamzy, was shot to death after leaving a beauty salon in South Wentworthville. According to The Daily Telegraph reporter Mark Morri, as stated in Episode 3 of the award-winning 'The War' series, he had only been out of jail for three days before he was murdered. Amoun bore a different last name to his brothers Mejid and Bassam as he had opted to go by his mother's maiden name. Amoun was the fifth and last member of the Hamzy/Hamze Clan to be murdered during the war, as of May 2024.

On 16 January 2022, The Daily Telegraph reported that well-known Sydney underworld figure Mustafa Ramlawie, previously a friend to both the Hamzy Family and the Alameddine Family, had had a $1 million bounty placed on his head by the Hamzys. This came after the Hamzys interpreted a lack of contact from Ramlawie throughout the conflict as him having sided with the Alameddines. Mustafa Ramlawie, as well as Mustafa's relative Khaled, were both on the list of 24 criminal figures that police sought to ban Mohammad 'Almo' Alameddine from associating with in 2022.

On 20 January 2022, a utility truck containing two individuals, believed to be associates of Mohammad 'Almo' Alameddine, was shot at on Ostend St in South Granville.

On 23 January 2022, Talal Alameddine was stabbed in a brawl in Goulburn Correctional Centre. It is unclear whether the attack on Talal was related to the ongoing conflict.

On 25 January 2022, the war came to a halt as the remaining members of the Hamzy family hierarchy were arrested. Alleged Hamzy family boss Ibrahem 'Ibby' Hamze was arrested in Queensland and extradited to New South Wales, and charged with soliciting the attempted murder of Murat Gulasi. On the same day, senior Hamzy clan members Bilal El-Chamy, Ahmed El-Chamy, Tareek Hamzy and Haissam Hamzy were arrested for the September 2021 kidnapping and stabbing of a man (supposedly an Alameddine associate) for failing to provide fraudulent COVID-19 vaccination certificates.

== FriendlyJordies fire bombing ==
In December 2023, Alameddine family associate Tufi Junior Tauese-Auelua, then 37, was arrested by police and charged with two counts of destroying or damaging property by fire after allegedly firebombing the house of Jordan Shanks twice within a period of two weeks. Shanks, known by his YouTube handle 'friendlyjordies', had revealed links between the Coronation Property Group, former Deputy-Premier John Barilaro, and the Alameddine network in a lengthy exposé entitled 'Coronation', which was posted on YouTube on 19 August 2022 before being removed from the platform on 1 February 2024, after FriendlyJordies received death threats.

Shanks' Bondi rental was firebombed sometime in November 2022, with another attempt to firebomb the same house having occurred the previous week. The New South Wales Police Force stated that there was a "strong possibility" that the attack against Shanks was done in retaliation for the video.

In September 2025, Tauese-Auelua was sentenced to five years in jail over the firebombing.

== Relationship with the Haouchar crime family ==
The Daily Telegraph reported that Rafat Alameddine spent time as a younger man shadowing Bilal Haouchar, and learning the criminal trade under his guidance. Bilal Hauochar is the boss of the Hauochar Crime Family- one of Sydney's biggest criminal enterprises.

On 11 August 2021, The Sydney Morning Herald published a photograph which showed Rafat and Bilal Alameddine dining with Osman Hauochar, seemingly at a wedding, sometime before Bilal's arrest and imprisonment in June 2017.

On 27 October 2021, Alameddine member Ali Elmoubayed, and associates Abdul Zreika and Bailey Togiavalu, were arrested for violently bashing Mohamad “Butch” Haouchar. Hauochar had verbally abused senior Alameddine figures in a video. According to police, Hauochar had said “F.... Rafat (Alameddine), f... Hamdi (Alameddine), f... Talal (Alameddine), f... the lot of youse”. It is unclear whether the assault on Butch had any impact the relationship between the Hauochar and Alameddine Families, as Butch is known for several high-publicity acts of foolishness, such as when he showed up at John Ibrahim's home in Dover Heights and attempted to extort him. Therefore, it is likely that Butch isn't intimately involved in the family business.

In November 2022, Rafat Alameddine left Sydney a free man, and travelled to live in Lebanon. Bilal Hauochar had been living in Lebanon since 2018. In March 2023, it was reported that there was drama going on between Bilal and Rafat overseas, which was allegedly well known to locals in the region.

== Timeline (2022-Present) ==
On 24 March 2022, KVT leader Joseph 'Jo Fresh' Vokai, 26, was charged with plotting a failed hit on Hamzy family boss Ibrahem Hamze in North Sydney in August 2021. Vokai had been in custody since December 2021.

On 12 April 2022, KVT leader Joseph 'Jo Fresh' Vokai, 26, faced the NSW Supreme Court to apply for bail. Vokai was arraigned on two counts of knowingly directing the activities of a criminal group, and one count each of contributing to criminal activity, dealing with proceeds of crime, and conspiracy to commit murder. Vokai's barrister at the time was Avni Djemal. Vokai's wife Tiffany Papadakis appeared in court on her husband's behalf to attempt to aid his fight for bail, however, he was ultimately denied, despite the offer of a $50,000 surety and conditions akin to house arrest.

In May 2022, New South Wales Police arrested 18 alleged members of the network, who were said to be behind a "large-scale drug supply operation", in connection with Strike Force Sugarcane. The men arrested were part of a subset within the Alameddine crime network known as "R4W", or Ready for War. Police allege that the leader of this collective was Asaad Alahmad, the brother-in-law of Rafat Alameddine. Asaad Alahmad's home was shot up in March 2021, and he survived an attempt on his life in May 2021. Alahmad was sentenced to 26 months in jail for his role in R4W.

On 16 July 2022, an unidentified "senior member" of the Alameddine crime network was stopped by police whilst driving a $350,000 Lamborghini and handed a "multi-venue banning order" which prohibited them from entering a venue in Sydney's Kings Cross for five years. This move by law enforcement was a result of the crackdowns brought about by Operation Eris. On the same evening, two unidentified OMCG associates were also handed the same orders.

On 18 July 2022, The Daily Telegraph reported that Mohamad Obeid, 31, had assumed the blame for all of the illicit contents seized from his family home on 8 February 2021. This move by Obeid, which entailed him pleading guilty to 37 drug and firearms charges, allowed his younger brother Noah to walk free from court. The Obeid brothers were represented in this matter by Abdul Saddik.

In January 2023, Masood Zakaria, the alleged "number two" in the organisation and the "most wanted man in NSW", was arrested in Bodrum, Turkey on charges of conspiring to murder, directing a criminal group and drug supply. The principle charge of murder was related to a plot to assassinate Ibrahim Hamze in North Sydney in 2021. Zakaria was extradited to Australia in December 2023.

On 15 February 2023, Omar Zakaria was found not guilty of two counts of dealing with proceeds of crime and one count of having suspected unlawfully obtained goods in his custody following a hearing at Parramatta Local Court.

On 19 April 2023, Ezzaddine Omar, a stolen-car rebirther who was arrested in 2021 in connection to the Mejid Hamzy killing, had his murder charge dropped in Burwood Local Court due to a lack of evidence.

On 24 April 2023, the South Granville home of Alameddine/R4W associate Noah Obeid, 21, was raided by police during a firearm prohibition order compliance check. In the search, detectives attached to Strike Force Raptor uncovered two loaded guns, cocaine, Tramadol, Valium and Pregabalin, as well as three mobile phones. Obeid was then arrested and charged with "13 offences including two counts of possessing an unregistered pistol, possessing ammunition without a licence, drug supply, acquiring a prohibited firearm while subject to a firearms prohibition order and dealing with proceeds of crime". In a video-link court appearance the next morning, his lawyer Abdul Saddik indicated that his client would not be applying for bail on the charges.

On 21 June 2023, Police were called to Pitt Street Mall after internal conflicts within the Alameddine Family led to a public-place brawl between senior members. Mohammad Zreika, Zane Zreika, Ahmad Alameddine, Ali Elmoubayed, Samimjan Azari, and Khaled Elmoubayed, were arrested and charged with affray.

Sometime in July 2023, Hamdi Alameddine pleaded guilty to entering Crown Sydney in Barrangaroo to dine at the Epicurean Restaurant despite being subject to a lifetime ban. Around the same time, Hamdi's wife, Roukaya Kanj, pleaded guilty to common assault stemming from a street-fight in Merrylands. An article published by The Daily Telegraph on 2 August 2023, stated that Hamdi and his wife, shortly after expediting their court matters, had left Australia for Lebanon to join their other family members. It is unknown whether Roukaya Kanj is related to slain Alameddine associate Shady Kanj.

On 4 November 2023, Jacob Najjar, once pictured with members of the Alameddine crime clan and known for his promotional content regarding his acai-cafe chain 'Thirsty Monkey', was kidnapped from his unit in Auburn and kept captive for around 24 hours. During the ordeal, Najjar suffered superficial stab wounds. He was found dumped on Lower Washington Dr in Bonnet Bay the following day at around 11pm.

On 19 January 2024, a man was kidnapped in Granville. Police allege the kidnapping was conducted by the Alameddine Family.

Sometime in January 2024, a large group of men armed with guns wearing balaclavas showed up at Ali 'Ay Huncho' Younes' home to assassinate him, however, he wasn't home.

On 27 March 2024, 16 members and associates of the Alameddine Crime Family were arrested in connection with Strike Force Wessex. These arrests followed the alleged shutdown of 26 "drug-run phones" connected to over 50,000 alleged customers. Prior to the arrests, New South Wales Police Force Deputy Commissioner David Hudson alleged that the network was "making up to $1 million per week profit". Notably, the raids saw the arrest of prominent Western Sydney drill-rapper Ali 'Ay Huncho' Younes, a cousin of Alameddine Family boss Rafat, who gained notoriety through his music. Whilst Younes was not charged with anything, Detective Superintendent Grant Taylor declared that Younes was awaiting questioning over the Granville kidnapping which occurred on January 19, 2024, and for allegedly participating in a criminal group. Also among those arrested were Ali Elmoubayed, Mahdy Zaineddine, Samimjan Azari and Elias Hajeer.

On 28 March 2024, it became public that Alameddine/R4W member Trente Jeske and high-profile gangster-widow Jade Heffer, 29, had gotten married soon after Jeske's release from jail. Heffer had previously been married to Lone Wolf bikie Yusuf Nazlioglu, who was famously acquitted after being charged with the February 2018 murder of Sydney underworld figure Mick Hawi. Nazlioglu was himself murdered on 27 June 2022. Following Nazlioglu's death, Heffer then dated fellow Alameddine associate Ahmed Alameddine. In August 2023, during her relationship with Alameddine, she was charged with hindering an investigation after assisting Ahmed's escape during a police raid on his Greenacre home, and with possessing a firearm and ammunition in contravention of a firearm prohibition order (FPO) after detectives recovered a 9mm pistol. For her charges, Heffer spent seven weeks on remand in custody before eventually being sentenced to an 18-month intensive corrections order.

On 11 April 2024, The Daily Telegraph reported that Ali 'Ay Huncho' Younes and Ali Elmoubayed had been charged with "kidnapping in company with intent to commit serious indictable offence occasion actual bodily harm" in connection to the January Granville kidnapping of a man. Younes and Elmoubayed both face a maximum sentence of 25 years if convicted.

On 30 April 2024, a home allegedly linked to the Alameddines was shot up on Myall Street in Merrylands.

On 8 May 2024, the New South Wales Police Force announced that Alameddine Crime Family boss Rafat Alameddine, as well as his lieutenant John Ray Bayssari, and Zaid Abdelhafez, were wanted on two counts of murder. These charges stemmed from the October 2021 double-murder of young drug-runner Salim Hamze, 18, and his innocent father Toufik Hamze, 64. In relation to the murders, Alameddine heavyweight Masood Zakaria was charged at Goulburn Correctional Centre, a supermax jail where he was already awaiting trial for the foiled murder plot against Ibrahem Hamze in August 2021. Alammedine-associate Adam Achrafi was arrested from his home in Austral.

On 3 June 2024, Alameddine associate Ahmed Karim was sentenced to a minimum term of eight years imprisonment for a vicious domestic violence attack committed in 2021. Karim will first be eligible for release in November 2029.

On 12 June 2024, Ali 'Ay Huncho' Younes got into a fight with ONEFOUR associate Sesita 'Radistarz' Lyzwa in the visiting room of Parklea Correctional Centre. Younes, then an inmate, instigated the fight upon seeing Lyzwa arrive as a visitor. Lyzwa was there to visit his brother Alexen.

On 13 June 2024, a vehicle was set alight in the driveway of Sesita 'Radistarz' Lyzwa's mother's house in Willmot.

On 14 June 2024, Sesita 'Radistarz' Lyzwa's mother house was shot up in drive-by shooting.

On 4 July 2024, Khaled Zreika was arrested and charged with "one count each of conspiracy to murder and participation in a criminal group" in relation to the plot to murder to Ibrahim Hamze.

On 30 July 2024, Ali 'Ay Huncho' Younes was released from jail after posting a $1.8million surety.

Between 12 and 14 August 2024, the conspirators behind a buprenorphine drug-smuggling operation for the Alameddine Crime Family were arrested across NSW by officers attached to Strike Force Wessex. Across the three-day period, police pinched Kathleen Woods, 75; Chad Woods, 44; Robert Kenney, 66; and Kerrie-Anne Manning, 50. The four individuals are accused of working a drug operation wherein they would smuggle ‘bupe’ strips into New South Wales jails when visiting Chad Woods, who was an inmate. The drugs were supplied to Ms Woods, Mr Kenney, and Ms Manning by Alameddine-associate Ali Elmoubayed, and the profits from the operation were reportedly funnelled back to Rafat Alameddine's brother-in-law Adam Alahmad. The drug ring is accused of operating between May and July 2023 - during which, it allegedly made around $250,000.

On 15 August 2024, Khaled Zreika, represented by solicitor Abdul Saddik, was refused bail on his conspiracy-to-murder charge in Parramatta Local Court.

On 9 September 2024, The Daily Telegraph reported on an alleged Alameddine crime network group chat wherein, as soon as one day after the double-murder of Salim Hamze and Toufik Hamze in 2021, Alameddine leader Rafat Alameddine, his lieutenant John Ray Bayssari, associate Khaled Zreika, Hamzy turncoat Zaid Abdelhafez, and a fifth unknown individual began planning the assassination of their 'Lucky Last' rival, Ibrahem Hamze.

On 13 September 2024, Mohammed Alameddine enjoyed a legal victory allowing him to go on an overseas vacation with his family despite facing charges that he breached a serious crime prevention order.

On 20 September 2024, NSW Police arrested an unidentified Alameddine crime network associate for allegedly attempting to sell a replica firearm to other patrons at a hotel on the Hume Highway in Bankstown. Officers from the State Crime Command's Raptor Squad conducted a search of the 42-year-old suspect, discovering a cigarette lighter designed to resemble a firearm hidden in his underwear, along with a small quantity of a substance suspected to be GBL (a prohibited drug) in his bag. The man was charged with acquiring a firearm while subject to a firearm prohibition order (FPO), possessing an unauthorised pistol, and possessing a prohibited drug.

On 23 September 2024, Alameddine crime network members Ali Elmoubayed, 31, and Mahdy Zaineddine, 23, were arrested and charged over their alleged roles in the prison drug-smuggling operation which saw four individuals arrested the previous month.

On 23 October 2024, the affray charge which had been pending against Ali 'Ay Huncho' Younes over his jail brawl with Sesita 'Radistarz' Lyswa were withdrawn and dismissed in Blacktown Local Court.

On 29 November 2024, associates of the Alameddine and KVT crime networks attempted to rob a tobacco delivery truck in Guildford.

On 4 January 2025, a large group of Alameddine/KVT associates attempted to steal a tonne of illicit tobacco from a warehouse in Condell Park. However, the group triggered the facility's alarm system, resulting in three men linked to the storage unit arriving at the scene of the ongoing robbery. The three men were threatened with weapons by the group before being bound at the hands and feet, and subjected to a “violent and barbaric attack" which entailed one of the victims having a toe partially amputated over the course of between 15 and 30 minutes. A call to the authorities was then made during the attack, and police arrived soon after, prompting the group to attempt to flee. Whilst six of the attackers managed to escape, two men - Ahamad Dudu, 26, and Mohamad Kaddour, 24 - were apprehended at the scene. Both were charged with aggravated break and enter, and take/detain in company. According to The Daily Telegraph, "Dudu was remanded in custody until his next court date on March 5, while Kaddour made no application for bail and will return to court on January 13".

On 1 February 2025, an unidentified man and an unidentified pregnant woman were arrested as they attempted to bring concealed balloons containing illicit drugs into Long Bay Correctional Centre for jailed member Alan Ahmad Alameddine, 34.

On 25 March 2025, an illicit-tobacco syndicate was smashed by police, leading to the arrests of Alameddine associates Emad Sleiman (47), Samimimjan Azari (26) and Tarek El-Hallak, and KVT associates Manasa 'Nasa Nova' Nayacakalou (28), Tyrone Fera (24) and Lachlan Nevale (26). The group was allegedly responsible for multiple criminal acts in the escalating NSW tobacco war, including the kidnapping and torturing of rival gang members at a warehouse in Condell Park on 4 January 2025, the attempted robbery of a tobacco delivery truck in Guildford on 29 November 2024, the robbery of $1.5million in cigarettes from a storage unit in Casula, and the attempted robbery of another storage unit in Girraween. Around 400kg of loose-leaf illicit tobacco was seized during the raids. Emad Sleiman, the man who police allege directed the syndicate, previously spent almost two decades imprisoned for the 1997 murder of rising sports star Jason Burton. Following his release from jail, Sleiman was identified as a person of interest in the March 2017 murder of underworld figure Kemel Barakat, and was himself shot in the car park of his Auburn apartment building the same month.

On 10 April 2025, seven alleged associates of the Alameddine crime network abducted an unidentified 27 year old businessman and his unidentified 29 year old girlfriend in Sunshine Coast, Queensland over an alleged $2.4 million debt. The 27-year-old man allegedly owned a gambling investment company called 'Worldwide Sporting Investment' which accepted a $250,000 investment from an Alameddine associate in January 2023. By October 2023, the Alameddines had allegedly invested a cumulative total of $3.1 million. At a unit in Maroochydore, the group continuously threatened the man with violence, prompting him to call around twenty associates of his in an attempt to gather the sum they were demanding. By the morning of 11 April 2025, some of the man's associates had alerted the police. That evening, at around 7:30pm, five of the seven kidnappers left the premises, leaving two men to guard the man and his girlfriend. Police arrived soon after and arrested the remaining two attackers, Joel A Batour-Pullin and Nassim Eid.

On 21 April 2025, The Daily Telegraph reported that Masood Zakaria's legal team, led by solicitor Mohammed Chahine and barrister Peter Lange, were taking his fight for bail "upstairs" to the Supreme Court after being rejected by the District Court in 2024.

On 13 May 2025, Strike Force Eeley detectives raided a taxation office in the Sydney CBD, and then arrested George Jack Michael, 43, on Edwin Street in Croydon. Michael worked as an accountant for the Alameddine crime network, and was "allegedly responsible for facilitating money laundering and fraud".

On 6 June 2025, Alameddine associates Anthony Khalil, Aaron John McCann, Omar Mohmed Ahmed Hassan, and Nezar Manly were extradited from New South Wales to Queensland over the 10 April 2025 kidnapping.

On 9 June 2025, the seventh Alameddine associate alleged to have been involved in the 10 April 2025 kidnapping, unable to be extradited due to a medical condition, turned himself in at a pre-arranged Brisbane police station. On the same day, Joel A Batour-Pullin and Nassim Eid had their matters mentioned in Maroochydore Magistrates Court. All the offenders involved in the kidnapping were charged with 'deprivation of liberty and extortion'; Batour-Pullin was hit with an additional charge after refusing to unlock his phone for police.

By 14 June 2025, all seven Alameddine associates charged over the 10 April 2025 kidnapping had been released from custody on strict bail conditions, with their charges adjourned until 4 August 2025.

On 20 June 2025, an unidentified 30 year old member of the Alameddine crime network was issued a Future Court Attendance Notice for dishonestly obtaining property by deception in relation to the arrest of accountant George Jack Michael.

On 11 July 2025, Alameddine associate Ali 'Ay Huncho' Younes was remanded to jail after being caught driving without displaying his P-plates whilst also speeding at 113km/hour in a 60km/hour zone near Coffs Harbour, thereby violating his conditional bail. His bodyguard Lisala Langi was arrested at the scene on an outstanding warrant for failing to complete court-ordered community service work for his domestic violence offences.

=== Alleged feud with KVT (2025) ===
In May 2025, The Daily Telegraph reported that in-fighting had allegedly began between the Alameddine family and the KVT street gang, their long-time ally. The impacts of this supposed feuding unto the personal relationships between the outfits' members, such as those arraigned together in the tobacco bust in March 2025, or between Alameddine rapper Ali 'Ay Huncho' Younes and KVT rapper Manasa 'Nasa Nova' Nayacakalou, are unknown. This feuding has allegedly already entailed several confrontations.

Sometime in early 2025, members of KVT and the Alameddine family, including KVT leader Joseph 'Jo Fresh' Vokai and Ali 'Ay Huncho' Younes, allegedly got into a brawl with one another at a gym somewhere in Western Sydney. The incident was reported to police, however, both Vokai and Younes denied that it occurred.

On 18 February 2025, three alleged members and associates of the Alameddine crime network, including Dawood Zakaria and Samimjan Azari, were shot-at on The Boulevard in Brighton-Le-Sands.

On 13 April 2025, KVT and Alameddine family members again allegedly got into a brawl, this time at a funeral for the father of an Alameddine member.

On 16 April 2025, a house on Faulds Road in Guildford West was shot-at in a drive-by shooting. At the time of the shooting, a 26-year-old female was present at the home. Police believe the house was targeted because of her relationship with an alleged Alameddine member.

On 19 May 2025, John Versace, 23, was shot to death at his home in Condell Park. Versace was murdered in a mistaken-identity attack that was allegedly targeting an Alameddine associate who lived nearby.

On 25 May 2025, Dawood Zakaria, 32, and lawyer Sylvan Singh, 25, were shot as they sat in a utility truck at a red light on Woodville Street in Granville, New South Wales. Zakaria was hit in the head, and Singh was hit in the arm and leg. The two other men Zakaria and Singh had been travelling with - Samimjan Azari, 26 and Levi Vitukawalu, 28 - were then arrested and charged over an unrelated firearm which was recovered inside the vehicle. Police allege that Azari was the intended target of the shooting.

On 26 May 2025, Dawood Zakaria, 32, died in hospital.

On 5 June 2025, Alameddine member Ali ‘Ay Huncho’ Younes, 27, made an application to Parramatta Local Court to have one of his bail conditions - daily reporting to a police station - relaxed. Younes cited the assassination of Dawood Zakaria as his reason, claiming that this aspect of his conditional release endangered his life.

On 8 June 2025, Ali Elmoubayed's car was set alight outside his home in Merrylands.

On 12 June 2025, Ali Elmoubayed's home was shot-at in Merrylands. At the time of the shooting, Elmoubayed was on his way to Parramatta Local Court to ask for his bail to be varied. A short time later, following a brief pursuit by PolAir, three suspects were taken into custody in Yagoona, and two other suspects believed to be linked to the shooting were arrested after crashing a stolen car on Prospect Road in Greystanes.

On 13 June 2025, gunmen stalked Samimjan Azari, 26, on a suburban street in Rosehill. Concerned members of the public alerted police to the suspicious activity of a lurking vehicle, prompting the would-be shooters to flee the scene.

On 13 June 2025, The Daily Telegraph identified the suspects who were arrested in the aftermath of the shooting of Ali Elmoubayed's house. The three men who were taken into custody in Yagoona were revealed as Asim Fagouf, 20; Jimmy Abdulrahim, 22; and Mustafa Musa, 23. They were charged with "conspire to discharge firearm and intend to cause grievous bodily harm, fire firearm at dwelling, damage property by fire and participate in a criminal group". The two suspects taken into custody in Greystanes were unable to be publicly named as they were both 17 years of age, however, police revealed that they were charged with "take and drive conveyance without consent of owner, accessory before the fact to damage property, custody of a knife in public and participate in a criminal group". Furthermore, it was stated that one of the 17 year old offenders was also facing charges relating to a violent home invasion which took place in February 2025 in Ermington.

On 16 June 2025, Samimjan Azari, 26, was shot in the arm and leg, his bodyguard was shot in the face, and an unidentified 50 year old waitress was shot twice in the torso inside M Brothers Kebab shop on South Parade in Auburn. The shooting occurred at around 1 pm, an hour after Azari reported for bail at a police station. By that evening, all three casualties of the shooting were listed as being in a "serious but stable" condition at Westmead Hospital, and police announced that they were probing platforms such as Airtasker in their investigation into how the gunmen were recruited.

On 18 June 2025, The Daily Telegraph disclosed the identities of the shooting victims aside Azari as aspiring footballer Kali Taiseni, 25, and shop employee Yurdagul Aydogu, 47. An update on Taiseni's injuries was also provided, revealing that shrapnel from the bullet wound he suffered had travelled through to his spine and caused significant damages, with Taiseni's family being warned he may never walk again. By this stage, Mrs Aydogu was still in a medically induced coma following two rounds of surgery to "remove bullet particles" from her body.

On 24 June 2025, Bassam Chalhoub, 62, was stabbed multiple times outside a home on Eve Street in Guildford. Police allege that the intended target of the attack was Chalhoub's son Emilio, the bodyguard of Alameddine affiliate Ali 'Ay Huncho' Younes. Around an hour after the ambush, detectives attached to Taskforce Falcon attended an address in Wentworthville where they arrested and charged an unidentified 15-year-old boy and an unidentified 22-year-old man over the stabbing.

On 26 June 2025, Luke Manassa, 21, was stabbed to death in Pemulwuy outside Alameddine associate Anthony Khalil's house. Khalil, however, was not residing at the home at the time. Close associates of Manassa were looking after the property for him. Police believe that Khalil may have been the target of the attack.

On 2 July 2025, an unidentified 15-year-old boy was arrested in Condell Park and charged with numerous offences, including "two counts of firing a firearm at a dwelling for organised criminal activity, four counts of damaging property by fire or explosion, and participating in a criminal group". The teen was alleged to have been the shooter in the 16 April shooting in Guildford West, as well as an unrelated shooting in Merrylands on 22 March.

On 3 July 2025, an unidentified 17-year-old boy was arrested in South Penrith, and an unidentified 16-year-old boy was arrested in Mount Druitt. Both teens were charged with the murder of Luke Manassa. Their alleged getaway vehicle was seized from a property in Woodcroft.

On 5 September 2025, KVT associate Ratu Vesikula was shot-at in a car on Victor Street in Greystanes.

On 14 September 2025, the former house of Alameddine associate Ali 'Ay Huncho' Younes was shot-up on Harris Street in Merrylands. His family members were allegedly present at the property at the time of the attack.
