= DLASTHR =

Australian crime gang

DLASTHR Assyrian Kings
- Gang member's tattoo
- Founded: 1997
- Founding location: Sydney, Australia
- Years active: 1997–present
- Territory: City of Fairfield
- Ethnicity: Assyrians
- Criminal activities: Battery; extortion; arms trafficking; drug trafficking; robbery; murder
- Rivals: Bronx Boys; True Kings

DLASTHR (The Last Hour) is an Assyrian criminal organization that is active in the south western suburbs of Sydney, Australia. The group is said to have originated from another gang, called the Assyrian Kings.

The crime gang has been involved in a number of murders and public shootings, as they established themselves as a major drug dealing and distribution syndicate. Many members sport plenty of ink, including a distinctive clenched fist on their back. NSW police have actively pursued the gang for years, conducting numerous operations that have netted weapons and drugs.

In the 2010s, gun violence was thought to be part of the gang's turf war over drug supply with its rival gang, the True Kings. The conflict between the two gangs led to a string of drive by shootings and firebombings in the western suburbs of Sydney.

== Origins ==
In the 1990s, Assyrian organised gangs began to appear in Sydney’s western suburbs, mainly involved in drug dealing. One of these groups became known as the Assyrian Kings. The group gained attention following the stabbing murder of off-duty police officer David Carty. At about 8:00 p.m. on 17 April 1997, Constable Carty and another officer were on foot patrol when they came across several people linked to the Assyrian gang on a street in Fairfield.

At about 2:10 a.m. the following morning, while off duty, Carty was at the Cambridge Tavern in Fairfield. While walking through the car park, he was ambushed by a group of men, including some of the people he had encountered earlier that night.

Carty was stabbed during the attack and died from his injuries. Members of the Assyrian Kings were later linked to his murder. Five people were charged in connection with the killing. Thamier Sako and Edward Esho received sentences of less than five and six years respectively, while the main offender, Dawood Odishu, was sentenced to 30 years in prison. Odishu, also known as Gilbert Adam, died in prison in April 2024, one day before the 27th anniversary of Carty’s murder.

Following Carty’s murder, the Assyrian Kings broke apart. In the early 2000s, however, figures including Raymon Youmaran and Linard Shamouil revived the group under the name DLASTHR.

== 2000s ==
=== Sefton Playhouse shooting ===
In December 2002, Dimitri Debaz was fatally shot at a strip club in Sefton. Raymon Youmaran quickly became the primary suspect, leading to his disappearance along with another suspect, Raphael Joseph, also known as "Hasoni."

According to the NSW Police submission, Joseph, Youmaran, and three other men arrived at the Sefton Hotel, where Debaz was celebrating his brother Aleck's birthday with a group of friends. Within moments of entering the hotel, a fight broke out between Joseph, his accomplices, and Dimitri and Aleck Debaz. Police reports indicated that CCTV footage showed Joseph and three accomplices running to their car, where Joseph and Youmaran each retrieved a 9mm handgun before fatally shooting Debaz, who was standing near the hotel's entrance. Three shots were fired into the victim's back in an execution-style manner before the gunmen fled the scene.

Sandro Mirad, the driver of Youmaran and Joseph's getaway car, was charged and pleaded guilty to being an accessory after the fact to Debaz's murder. Mirad received a two-and-a-half-year sentence, with one-and-a-half years to be served non-custodially.

As Youmaran evaded authorities and went into hiding, numerous retaliation attempts targeted individuals associated with him over several years. While in hiding, Youmaran engaged in drug distribution in the southwestern suburbs of Sydney, eventually becoming New South Wales' most wanted man.

=== The Rocks double murder ===
On April 16, 2005, at approximately 1:10 AM, Naser Ghaderi and Keyvan Ghajaloo were fatally shot in a drive-by incident on Hickson Road, The Rocks, Sydney. According to reports, Ghaderi and Ghajaloo were standing near a vehicle when a BMW and a Volkswagen approached. The driver of the BMW allegedly inquired, "Are you the Persians from the party?" Following this exchange, gunfire was discharged, resulting in the deaths of Ghaderi and Ghajaloo. The incident was believed to be a retaliatory act stemming from an altercation involving Ghaderi at a Persian event two weeks prior.

During the coroner's inquest, Ahmed Alfadly, a non-Assyrian associate of the gang, was identified as the individual involved in the preceding altercation with Ghaderi. Raymon Youmaran and Danny Hurmuz were also identified as potential persons of interest in connection with the homicides. Alfadly departed Australia for Kuwait five days post-incident and has not since returned. As of the current date.

=== Babylon cafe shooting ===
In November 2005, the Babylon Cafe in Fairfield, New South Wales, became the site of a violent incident when it was targeted in a drive-by shooting. The attack resulted in the death of Raymond Khananyah, an innocent bystander, and left three others wounded. According to reports, three individuals wearing balaclavas and wielding semi-automatic pistols emerged from a dark-colored vehicle and discharged approximately 17 rounds into the cafe. Authorities suspect that the incident was a case of mistaken identity. The vehicle used in the shooting was later recovered, leading to several arrests; however, Raymon Youmaran remained at large.

A coroner’s inquest in 2011 into the Babylon Cafe shooting brought to light that, in the days preceding the murder, there had been a prior shooting and a physical altercation during which a firearm was brandished. Peter McGrath, Counsel assisting the Coroner, stated that police investigators believed the shooting was perpetrated by a local Assyrian gang.

During the inquest, five individuals were identified as persons of interest in connection with Khananyah's death: Ramon Youmaran, Steven David, Danny Hurmz, George Hanna, Samer Marcus, and Michael Odisho.

=== Youmaran police chase & arrest ===
On 14 February 2006, police identified Youmaran at a residence in Woodcroft, Sydney, which was under police surveillance. At about 6:15 p.m., Youmaran entered the passenger seat of a green Mercedes-Benz. Police then began a high-speed pursuit, with the vehicle reaching speeds of up to 200 km/h on the M2 and M7 motorways. The pursuit was later abandoned due to safety concerns.

The following day, a 24-year-old man suspected of involvement was arrested and taken to Green Valley Police Station for questioning. Detectives later impounded the Mercedes-Benz from a residence in Cecil Hills, believing it to be the vehicle involved in the pursuit. The vehicle was subsequently subjected to forensic examination.

In June 2006, Youmaran was arrested in Mount Pritchard during a series of coordinated police raids across Sydney’s western suburbs. He had reportedly spent almost four years in hiding before his arrest. Seven other alleged gang members, including Linard Shamouil, were also arrested. Steven David of Hinchinbrook and Allan Dennis Pena of Mount Pritchard were arrested during the operation and charged with supplying 3,000 methylamphetamine tablets, with an estimated street value of $1.2 million. Both men were remanded in custody to appear at Liverpool Local Court.

During Youmaran’s first court appearance, he was handcuffed and guarded by six police officers. A heated exchange took place between Youmaran and Mr Debaz’s father, with Debaz’s father and several relatives shouting abuse at him. Police and detectives from the Middle Eastern Organised Crime Squad intervened and removed both parties from the courtroom on the orders of the magistrate.

Youmaran later pleaded guilty to the murder of Debaz. He made full admissions to police concerning his involvement in the shooting and did not retract his confession. He acknowledged that Debaz was unarmed and lying on the ground at the time of the shooting. In June 2008, Youmaran was sentenced to a minimum of 17 years’ imprisonment.

=== Prison release ===
Youmaran was released on parole on 30 September 2023. He remained subject to sentences for supplying a large commercial quantity of a prohibited drug and taking part in the supply of a commercial quantity of a prohibited drug. The latter sentence is due to expire in August 2026. His parole conditions prohibit him from using illegal drugs, possessing prohibited weapons, or contacting his co-offenders, victims, or their families.

=== Hamilton Road shooting ===
On 9 April 2006, Ashoor Audisho, a DJ at the Assyrian Australian Association Nineveh Sports and Community Club in Edensor Park, was fatally shot on Hamilton Road in Fairfield West. The killing was linked to Youmaran and his associates. Witnesses saw three men confront Audisho before they fled in a black Jeep Cherokee. Three suspects were later arrested and denied bail.

Linard Shamouil, a founding member of the criminal organization, pleaded guilty to Audisho’s murder. Court documents stated that the killing followed remarks made about Shamouil’s younger relative at an Assyrian festival in Fairfield on 2 April. Seven days later, Shamouil and two other men confronted Audisho outside a 7-Eleven store on Hamilton Road. During the fight, Shamouil produced a firearm and shot Audisho.

Shamouil was sentenced to 19 years’ imprisonment, with a non-parole period of 14 years and six months. He was also sentenced for the attempted murder of Daniel Dawood, who had been shot outside his home in 2004. That sentence was 12 years, with a nine-year non-parole period, partly concurrent with the sentence for Audisho’s murder. Prosecutors relied on telephone records, witness testimony, and vehicle evidence.

Shamouil also received a five-year non-parole period for supplying 5,902 methylamphetamine tablets in May 2006. Police alleged the drugs were sold to undercover officers for $45,000. He was also charged with selling an unlicensed .45-calibre pistol to Sahir Marcus at West Hoxton.

Steven David and Dilan Shaba pleaded guilty to being accessories after the fact to Audisho’s murder and were each sentenced to between one and three years’ imprisonment.

=== Attempted murder & night club shooting ===
In June 2006, Sahir Marcus and Adam Saliba, both alleged members of DLASTHR, were arrested and charged with the attempted murder of Fayez Jenzarli. Police alleged Jenzarli was shot in the back of the leg outside his home in Prairiewood on March 25, 2006, after gunmen allegedly opened fire near the property late that evening.

Earlier that same night, Adam Saliba had himself been wounded after being shot in the stomach during a separate attack outside the Roxy Nightclub in Parramatta. The shooting sparked a major police investigation amid concerns of escalating violence linked to organised crime figures in Sydney’s southwest.

Following their arrests, Marcus and Saliba appeared before Fairfield Local Court, where they were both refused bail. The matter was later adjourned for the pair to appear before Liverpool Local Court.

A month earlier, police charged Farhad Quami, also known as Kuami, from South Granville, over the attempted murder of Adam Saliba in relation to the nightclub shooting. Quami had earlier been extradited from Perth over the murders of boxer Bassam Chami, and alleged drug dealer Ibrahim Assaad, who were shot dead in South Granville on March 29, only days after the Roxy nightclub shooting.

=== Raphael Joseph arrest in the USA ===
In October 2006, Raphael Joseph was arrested in San Diego United States. Australian authorities only discovered Joseph was in the United States by chance after US immigration officers arrested him over an unrelated immigration matter. After requesting to be deported to his country of birth, Iraq, Joseph was extradited from the U.S. in February 2008, following a legal battle to remain there for over a year. At the time of his extradition, it was reported that he unsuccessfully appealed to then-US Secretary of State Condoleezza Rice, claiming he faced “torture or death” if returned. In March 2008, he appeared in a Sydney court and was charged with the murder of Dimitri Debaz. However, the murder charges against Joseph were eventually dropped. This decision came after he had already spent approximately 18 months in custody in the United States, awaiting extradition and facing legal proceedings.

=== Joseph's disappearance ===
On 20, March 2014, Raphael Joseph disappeared after a meeting in Auburn, New South Wales, and was presumed by police to have been abducted and murdered.

Police believe only hours before his abduction, Joseph visited the ex-partner of former Sydney Hells Angel Wayne Schneider, who was abducted and murdered 18 months later. The two were friends who had risen through gang ranks to become major international criminals, each dealing in millions of dollars of drugs.

On 20, February 2018, Police alleged that Joseph was kidnapped and "inevitably murdered" by a drug syndicate on a rural property in Blaxlands Ridge in Sydney's north-west. police were "rewarded with a series of breakthroughs" after a car with secret compartments was found on a rural property which was linked with Joseph's disappearance. Police said they believed Joseph's remains could also be located on the property where the vehicle was found.

On 11 Jul 2018, the NSW Police announced the reward of $1 million in a bid to encourage people to offer up a "final piece" of information to prosecute those involved in the 2014 murder of Joseph. Police believe people who murdered Joseph were known to them and that he was murdered for financial gain and betrayed by the people he trusted. Police also allege that his body was dumped in a barrel and dissolved in acid.

== 2010s ==
=== Police raids ===
On 24, September 2013, more than 300 armed Sydney Police undertook 22 raids that "severely disrupted" the gang. Fifteen suspects were arrested, with four jet skis, a Lotus sports car, replica guns and a boat were confiscated by NSW police for the investigation. A high-ranking member and gang coordinator was arrested at a Rossmore farm property and charged. The criminals faced 29 charges relating to drug provision and possession and being part of a gang. 8 kg of cannabis was found in one of the raids, plus close to $25,000 in cash.

On 7 May 2014, police arrested members of the Assyrian gang and stated that the organisation’s operations had been dismantled, describing the group as effectively defunct. During the execution of search warrants, officers seized cannabis with an estimated value of $20,000. Police further indicated that the earlier seizure of ten firearms had contributed significantly to the collapse of the DLASTHR criminal organisation and led to the arrest of numerous individuals involved in drug distribution across south-western Sydney.

Following the discovery of the firearms and the arrest of two gang members in early 2012, a covert strike force targeting organised Assyrian criminal networks in the region was established. Designated “Evesson,” the strike force constituted a large-scale, intelligence-driven operation conducted at the local policing level..

In late May 2014, Danny Hurmuz and Phelmon Shemoon were arrested and formally charged with engaging in large-scale commercial drug supply and with directing the activities of a criminal organisation. A week later, an individual alleged by police to have been associated with DLASTHR, was charged with the supply of 337 grams of cocaine between January and March 2014. Police officers executing a search warrant at his residence in Greenfield Park seized cannabis, steroids, and multiple mobile phones.

=== Coffs Harbour drug seizure ===
On 22 July 2015, police stopped a vehicle travelling south along the Pacific Highway through Coffs Harbour shortly after 3:00 a.m. (AEST). During a search of the vehicle, police found what they alleged was about $250,000 worth of crystal methamphetamine hidden in the roof lining of a black Holden Astra.

Andre Kallita was arrested at the scene and charged with drug supply and possession offences. He later appeared before Coffs Harbour Local Court, where he did not apply for bail. The matter was adjourned to a later date.

Police said the investigation included alleged links to the organised crime group DLASTHR. Detective Inspector Darren Jameson said police would allege that Kallita was a confirmed member of the organisation.

In 2017, the District Court of New South Wales sentenced Kallita to 10 years’ imprisonment, with a non-parole period of seven years. The court found that he had knowingly taken part in transporting the methylamphetamine, which had an estimated street value of about $250,000 at the time.

=== Prison stabbings ===
In 2015, Adnan “Eddie” Darwiche was stabbed multiple times at Goulburn maximum-security prison in an attack carried out by members of the Assyrian gang. The attack took place during the day and was witnessed by four prison guards. Linard Shamouil stabbed Darwiche eight times with an improvised weapon made from a toilet brush. At the same time, an associate of Darwiche was attacked with a sandwich toaster handle. Prison intelligence later indicated that the attack was a pre-emptive strike linked to ongoing tensions between Muslim and Christian inmates.

In August 2016, Darwiche was moved to Cessnock prison following the attack. Fadi “Ricky” Shamoun was later stabbed by Darwiche and another inmate inside his prison cell, in what was described as retaliation for the earlier attack. Shamoun was stabbed several times in the forearms, body and back of the head with a sharpened piece of an aluminium window frame. He was not seriously injured and returned to prison later the same day.

Shamoun, who had close ties to the Assyrian gang, was serving a minimum 27-year sentence for murder following a dispute over a business matter.

=== Rival gang ===
In 2016, conflict between DLASTHR and a young breakaway group known as "True Kings", resulted in Drive by shootings, fire bombings and intimidation, as tensions over drug supply erupted between the two gangs.

In March 2016, a house fire in Edensor Park was linked to the escalating conflict between the Assyrian Kings and the True Kings, rival groups vying for control in the city's southwest. Although it was initially believed that the house was unoccupied when the fire started, local police and the Middle Eastern Crime Squad investigated it as a suspicious incident. This fire occurred after two cars at the same address were firebombed a month earlier, during which a 21-year-old resident reported hearing "explosions," leading police to classify the event as a targeted attack.

On 11 May 2016, police arrested and charged three alleged gang members with shooting with intent to murder following an incident in Edensor Park.

Authorities allege the men fired on a vehicle occupied by members of a rival group, the True Kings. The passenger escaped, but one occupant remained trapped inside the car. A gang member allegedly approached and attempted to shoot him, however the firearm failed to discharge. Samer Marcus, Danny Hanna, and George Hanna were subsequently taken into custody, appeared before Fairfield Local Court, and were charged with shooting with intent to murder.

=== Fairfield Station ===
In August 2016, two gang members were charged with the attempted murder of a 14-year-old near Fairfield railway station. The teenager was attacked with a knife after fleeing into an apartment complex, sustaining multiple stab wounds, but ultimately survived the assault. The attack was reportedly linked to a late-night altercation outside McDonald’s two days earlier, during which the victim had knocked down one of the gang members’ associates. The judge noted that “this unfortunate sequence of events was the catalyst for the serious offense that occurred,” highlighting how a minor confrontation escalated into a violent, life-threatening attack.

On 17 October 2018, Olivar Merza was sentenced to 12 years’ imprisonment for a near-fatal stabbing. Martin Hana was sentenced to six years and two months’ imprisonment, with a minimum term of four years and three months before becoming eligible for parole. Hana pleaded guilty to wounding with intent to cause grievous bodily harm in connection with the revenge attack.

=== Park shooting & murder of Buxton ===
On 24 December 2016, 20-year-old Antonio Hermiz was shot and killed at Lizard Log Park in Wetherill Park, while 18-year-old Ronaldo Odisho was injured in the same incident. The pair were sitting in their car at the park when another vehicle approached. Witnesses reported an argument between two groups of men before shots were fired. Both individuals were known to police and had alleged links to the gang..

Earlier that same year, ex-Nomads bikie gang member Adrian Buxton was fatally shot outside his home on 17 May 2016. In the aftermath of Hermiz’s killing, police came to suspect that the Assyrian criminal organisation may have been behind Buxton’s death; however, no definitive motive has been established and multiple theories remain unsubstantiated.

During a police raid in Cabramatta in September 2016, officers seized a vehicle, a .32 calibre pistol, and a .357 Magnum, and arrested two alleged gang members. Police believe the firearms were involved in Buxton’s murder, with ballistic analysis confirming one of the weapons was used in the killing.

It is further alleged that Hermiz was attempting to hide an Audi Q7 linked to Buxton’s murder before he was killed at Lizard Log Park.

Police suggest several possibilities regarding Buxton's death: he may have been having an affair with someone linked to a member of the Assyrian gang, a payment might have been made for a professional hit on him, or he could have been killed due to his connections with an outlaw motorcycle gang..

Police would not say if Hermiz was directly involved in the murder or what his role was, including disposing of the getaway car.

In April 2021, Olivar Merza was charged For hindering Buxton’s murder investigation. Merza, who was already serving a 12-year jail sentence, was sentenced to a further two years and three months in prison with a non-parole period of one year in his involvement of Buxton's murder. Court documents revealed that Mr Merza owned the Audi Q7 used in the shooting of Mr. Buxton and that he was using associates to conceal the vehicle. In April 2021, police announced a $1 million reward for information about Buxton’s murder. Despite continued searches for the Audi, police have never recovered it.

=== Cannabis supply arrests ===
In February 2017, Alina Antal was arrested in Cabramatta and was accused of being involved in cannabis supply in the greater Fairfield area. Antal is alleged to have been recruiting, as well as directing teenagers. Police allege she was closely associated with Olivar Merza. Eight people were arrested, one those targeted included the brother of an alleged associate of the gang, who is in jail.

Investigators seized cannabis, cash, mobile phones, SIM cards, clothing and drug paraphernalia in raids of seven homes in Fairfield, Cabramatta West, Smithfield and Elizabeth Hills. Antal and Merza, were both charged with recruiting young teenage boys, and acting with intent to pervert the course of justice.

=== Gold Coast ===
In March 2017, police discovered that the Assyrian crime gang was operating from Queensland's Gold Coast with drug distribution in the area. Police arrested and charged Kris Mircevski, with more than 30 drugs charges. police allege Mircevski was operating in the Gold coast for a number of years, and that many gang members were visiting the Gold Coast on a regular basis. Police also allege that the gang was assisting outlaw motorcycle gangs with the distribution of drugs and weapons.

== 2020s ==
=== Samer Marcus life attempts ===
In June 2020, Samer Marcus was shot when a man unleashed a number of shots as one hit Marcus in the face. It was revealed that Marcus had driven to Bonnyrigg Heights to confront a 33-year-old man he had a grievance with. Marcus turned up at hospital with a gunshot wound three days after being hit with the bullet. Adam Saliba, a childhood friend and member of the crime gang, was charged with ten offences, including shooting with intent to murder and discharging a firearm. Marcus was also charged with concealing information from police after not reporting that he was shot.

Saliba, was sentenced to 9 years and 6 months’ imprisonment, with a non-parole period of 6 years, after being convicted of the attempted murder

On November 6, 2020, Marcus was gunned down outside his parents' home in Denham Court just before 9pm. He was shot five times in the face and head from close range. He was treated on-site by paramedics before being rushed to hospital in critical condition.

After surviving the assassination, Marcus was moved from the hospital he was treated at, for fear that those responsible for the hit would try to finish the job. It was the second assassination attempt on his life that year, with his injuries so severe Marcus would unlikely fully recover that he would become paralyzed. Police believe the shooting could be linked to tensions between rival gangs in Western Sydney as investigators could not confirm whether the two shootings were linked or whether they are part of a separate affair.

In May 2021, Luke "Fatboy" Sparos, a convicted drug smuggler, was apprehended and charged with shooting with intent to murder and tampering with evidence with intent to mislead a judicial tribunal. Law enforcement officials assert that the shooting was retaliation for a stabbing incident involving Sparos and the victim at a NSW correctional facility on the mid-north coast in July 2019. Stanley Ceismann was also charged in connection with the case earlier that year. Police suspect that Ceismann stole a BMW M4 from a residence in Lilyfield in July 2020, which was later used in the Denham Court shooting. Sparos, 42, denied involvement in the alleged attempted murder of Samer Marcus as he awaited trial. In 2023, Sparos was additionally charged with the murder of Alen Moradian, a prominent figure in the Sydney underworld and a member of the Comanchero outlaw motorcycle gang.

According to court and coronial records, Marcus was convicted in 2008 of supplying a large commercial quantity of methylamphetamine and was sentenced to 14 years’ imprisonment, with a non-parole period of 10 years. In 2012, while serving that sentence, he was convicted of the attempted murder of Daniel Wood and sentenced to 12 years’ imprisonment, with a non-parole period of nine years. The sentencing court ordered part of the attempted murder sentence to be served concurrently with his existing sentence.

=== Amar Kettule ===
On January 11, 2021, Amar Kettule, a founding member of the True Kings gang, was fatally shot multiple times in his vehicle outside the entrance to his apartment car park. Despite the efforts of emergency personnel to revive him, he was pronounced dead at the scene. Later that day, a burnt out dark-colored Jeep Cherokee believed to have been used in the shooting was found in Smithfield.

Seeking the public's aid, investigators released CCTV footage of two men fleeing the scene post-shooting and a white Toyota Corolla seen later that day on Reserve Street in Smithfield. Police allege the “callous killing” was connected to an ongoing feud between rival Assyrian gangs, the True Kings and DLASTHR, a crime group that has long been regarded as a sworn enemy of Mr Kettule over the years.

According to the New South Wales Coroner, Kettule had previously been the target of several violent attacks, including a stabbing in 2005 and drive-by shootings at his family home. In 2008, he was convicted of aggravated break and enter offences and sentenced to two years and nine months’ imprisonment, before being released in 2012. He survived another shooting in Edensor Parkin 2013. The Coroner’s findings noted that police believed he had been targeted by the organised crime group DLASTHR.

Dylan, the 19-year-old younger brother of Mr Kettule, was also shot dead outside his girlfriend's apartment block in Canley Vale in January 2014. To this day, the murder has not been solved.

In the early hours of Thursday, 6 November 2025, police investigating the murder of Amar Kettule carried out search warrants at homes in Bossley Park and Austral, New South Wales. Two men, aged 22 and 23, were arrested during the operation and later refused bail before appearing in court. Police allege the pair were responsible for torching a car linked to Mr Kettule’s shooting.

=== Foiled hit ===
In December 2023, Andre Kallita, a former member of the Assyrian crime gang, was targeted in a planned shooting outside the Day Street police station in Sydney's central business district.

Omar Haouchar, the younger brother of Bilal Haouchar, was charged over an alleged attempted murder conspiracy. He is accused of offering up to $400,000 to a gunman to carry out the killing of Andre Kallita, however the plot was disrupted after a parking enforcement officer identified a suspected getaway vehicle parked illegally. Police later arrested two men in connection with the matter.

Court documents filed in the NSW Supreme Court revealed a dispute had emerged between the Haouchar crime network and the Comanchero outlaw motorcycle gang over an alleged drug debt.

The documents further alleged that Kallita was a member of the Comancheros and a close associate of cocaine trafficker Alen Moridian, who was fatally shot in a Bondi Junction car park in June 2023.

Several individuals allegedly linked to the Kallita murder plot have also been accused of involvement in Moridian’s killing.

=== Harold hotel Pub shooting ===
On 17 August 2025, at approximately 6:40 PM, police were called to The Harold Hotel on Ross Street in Forest Lodge, responding to reports of a shooting.

The shooting was a targeted attack, carried out by at least one gunman. The victims were reportedly walking to their car after watching the UFC at the pub when they were ambushed and shot at. Maradona Yalda, was seriously injured in the shooting, while his friend, Gilbert Shino, 39, tragically died at the scene from multiple gunshot wounds. Police sources confirmed that Mr. Yalda, an associate of Assyrian gang had been recently alerted to threats against his life prior to his return to Australia less than a week before the incident.

Investigators believe the shooting was targeted and involved at least one gunman, though they haven't ruled out the possibility of a second shooter. A bullet narrowly missed a female staff member, striking the pub's window.

== Police Response ==
NSW Police Assistant Commissioner Frank Mennilli confessed that getting information from relatives and associates of the gang affiliates is the most vital aspect, stating, "If ever there is to be a message, it is to the family and friends of the people involved in crime. If you want to help ... to do the right thing then – it's about telling the police". The hesitancy to come forward has thwarted recent police efforts to put a stop to the rising gang-related crime in Fairfield. He described the gang as "a criminal group that have made thousands upon thousands of dollars through their criminal activities" and "have been involved in public place shootings, in murders, and have been a criminal enterprise within the south west of Sydney." He concluded, "The New South Wales police force will not rest until we put each and every one of these criminals behind bars and smashed this particular operation."
