= Nomads Motorcycle Club (Australia) =

Australian outlaw motorcycle club

- Abbreviation: 14-NMC
- Founded: 1968; 58 years ago
- Founded at: Newcastle, New South Wales, Australia
- Type: Outlaw motorcycle club
- Region served: Australia
- Key people: John Thomas Browne "Metho Tom"

The Nomads Motorcycle Club is an outlaw motorcycle club in Australia with a large number of chapters and members nationwide. It was founded in Newcastle in 1968. A number of countries have motorcycle clubs called "Nomads Motorcycle Club", e.g. Australia, South Africa and Germany, and there is a Nomads gang in New Zealand.

== History ==
Nomads MC was founded in Newcastle, New South Wales, Australia, 1968. Since then the club has expanded to all states and territories across the country.

== Patch & Colors ==
The Nomads patch consists of a skull wearing a helmet. The helmet has wings. Behind the helmet are a set of pistons. A small set of wings are also seen beside the "NOMADS" text.

The Nomads colors are black and white.

== Chapters ==
The club has chapters throughout Australia, but none in other countries.

Rough geographical locations of the chapters are as follows:

- Adelaide chapter
- Newcastle chapter
- Parramatta, New South Wales / Girraween, New South Wales / Wetherill Park, New South Wales chapter (Western Sydney)
- Sydney / Marrickville, New South Wales chapter
- North coast Byron Bay, New South Wales chapter
- Blacktown, New South Wales chapter
- Victoria chapter
- Gold Coast chapter
- Brisbane chapter
- Hobart chapter
- Launceston chapter
- Perth chapter

== Well-Known Members ==
John Thomas Browne – Nomads First National President & Original Nomads Member

John Thomas Browne, mostly known as "Metho Tom" but also known as "Tom", "Brownie" or "The King" was a well known member of the Sydney Chapter and was a well respected figure among The Motorcycle Clubs of Sydney.

Metho Tom was one of the original members of The Nomads MC, joining back in 1969. In his further years with the club he went on to become The President of the Sydney Chapter, a Life Member then ultimately became The First National President of the club.

Metho Tom also built and owned Harley Davidson of Blacktown on Sunnyholt Road in Blacktown, his shop was one of the biggest Harley Dealers in Sydney. In 2005 during a dispute with The Rebels MC, Metho Tom's shop was targeted by a ram raid, with the estimate of $1 Million in the total costs of damages.

Metho Tom was diagnosed with cancer in 2007, he died later in April 2008. Alongside The Nomads MC, members of The Bandidos, The Lone Wolves, Highway 61, The Hells Angels, The Black Uhlans, The Gladiators, The Comancheros and The Rebels all came together to bid farewell to Metho Tom, with thousands of club members riding through the streets of Western Sydney, blocking roads and stopping traffic. It was one of Australia's largest bikie funerals.

Scott Orrock – Nomads National President / Hells Angels MC Member

After Metho Tom stood down from his role as National President around the early 2000s, Scott Orrock became the National President of the club.

Orrock was involved in several high-profile events including the shooting at the Nomads Newcastle clubhouse in September 2004 (see "Crime/In The Media" section below for more information).

He owned multiple tattoo shops including "Skin Deep Tattoo" in Newtown, New South Wales.

In December 2009, Orrock left the Nomads and joined the Hells Angels, bringing with him several members of the Nomads. This move was one of the reasons for the escalating violence between the Nomads and Hells Angels over the coming months, including his vehicle being torched the following day.

== Significant Events ==
2004 – 12 September 2004. Parramatta Member Sam Ibrahim, National President Scott Allan Orrock and Paul James Griffin travel to the Nomads Newcastle clubhouse for a meeting accompanied by approximately 40 other members. A fight broke out at the clubhouse, with Newcastle Sergeant-At-Arms Dale Campton was shot in both knees by Ibrahim. Newcastle chapter member Mark Chrystie was also shot in both legs. A third Newcastle member had his Nomads jacket and ring taken, before being bashed. In May 2006, Campton became a police informer and provided details of the crime.

2005 – June 2005. Harley Davidson of Blacktown owned by Metho Tom, was targeted in a ram raid during a dispute with The Rebels MC, causing an estimated $1 Million of damages.

2006 – May: Newcastle Sergeant at Arms Dale Campton, became a police informer, providing them details of the fight with the Parramatta chapter on 12 September 2004.

2006 – December 2006. Ibrahim, Orrock and Griffin were arrested for the 12 September 2004 attack on the Newcastle members. As part of Ibrahim's arrest his unit in Parramatta was raided by police. In the raid police uncovered weapons, ammunition, a bullet proof vest, walking stick sword and nunchakus, leading him to also be charged for 11 weapons and property offences.

2007 – April 2007. The "Skin Deep Tattoo" store in Newtown, Sydney, which is owned by Orrock, was shot at.

2008 – April 2008. Metho Tom died due to cancer. As a sign of respect members of The Bandidos, The Lone Wolves, Highway 61, The Hells Angels, The Black Uhlans, The Gladiators, The Comancheros and The Rebels attended his funeral alongside The Nomads and came together to bid farewell to Metho Tom, becoming one of Australia's largest Bikie funerals.

2008 – October 2008. Ibrahim, Orrock and Griffin were acquitted of the 2004 attack at the Newcastle clubhouse.

2009 – 27 February 2009. 14 Nomads were inside the Sydney chapter clubhouse in Marrickville when gunmen wearing balaclavas entered. Three Nomads were shot in the legs and lower torso before the gunmen leave the building.

2009 – 3 December 2009. A Toyota Soarer vehicle owned by former President Scott Orrock was torched. This attack came the day after he patches in to the Hells Angels Motorcycle Club.

2015 – 30 January 2015. 13 members of the Nomads are arrested following a raid on their clubhouse in Wetherill Park, Sydney. Most of those arrested were charged under recently brought in legislation making it illegal to consort with convicted offenders. The Wetherill Park clubhouse was shut down as part of the raids.

2015 – May 2015. 12 people associated with the Nomads, including 2 high-ranking members, are arrested in raids across New South Wales and Adelaide. The group includes mainly members of the Adelaide chapter. Charges against the 12 people include soliciting to murder, kidnapping, blackmail and assault. Included in those arrested were the Adelaide chapter President, Adelaide Sgt-At-Arms and the New South Wales Vice President. Police advise that the crimes "were committed as a result of the victims not undertaking the required acts set out by the Nomads" and that the victims were either Nomads members or associates.

== Books, Magazines & Movies ==
While there are no books or magazines specific to The Nomads Motorcycle Club, there are multiple that detail few or numerous events that they have been involved in and mention key members of The Nomads Motorcycle Club.

The Prez - Book by David Spiteri.

Enforcer - Book by Caesar Campbell and Donna Campbell.

Wrecking Crew - Book by Caesar Campbell and Donna Campbell.

The Outlaw and the Hitman - Book by Caesar Campbell and Donna Campbell.

Outlaw Bikers in Australia - Book by Duncan McNab.

OzBike Magazine - Issues: 232 & 320

Live To Ride Magazine - Issues: 50 & 239

The Nomads Motorcycle Club also have an unreleased Movie detailing their 1998 30th Anniversary Ride showcasing key events and key members, it is still unknown if this film will ever release.

== See also ==
- Criminal Law (Criminal Organisations Disruption) Amendment Act 2013
- List of outlaw motorcycle clubs
- Nomad (motorcycle club membership)
