= Lebanese mafia =

Organized crime groups that originate from Lebanon

- Founded: 1940s
- Founding location: Lebanon
- Years active: Since the mid-20th century
- Territory: Middle East, Europe, Australia, North America and South America
- Ethnicity: Lebanese
- Activities: Arms trafficking, assault, drug trafficking, extortion, fraud, murder, theft, money laundering, counterfeiting, kidnapping
- Allies: American Mafia; Armenian mafia; Colombian cartels; Comanchero MC; Corsican mafia; Greek mafia; Romanian Mafia; Hells Angels MC; Mongols MC; Nomads MC; Notorious MC; Sicilian Mafia
- Rivals: Occasional feuds between clans.
- Notable members: List of members

Lebanese mafia is a colloquial term for organised crime groups which originate from Lebanon. Lebanese organised crime is active in the country of Lebanon itself, as well as in countries and areas with a large Lebanese community, most notably Australia, Canada, and also in the Triple Frontier in South America. Lebanese organised crime syndicates generally are active globally, largely due to the mass Lebanese population.

== Lebanon ==
Due to its geographical location, Lebanon was known for drug trafficking during the 20th century, as the Port of Beirut gave smugglers direct links to various cities around the Mediterranean. During the era of the "French Connection" drug network, the Lebanese mafia acted as a bunch of middlemen in a global heroin trafficking operation. French-speaking Lebanese wannabe gangsters obtained morphine base from Turkish opium producers and then sold it on to contacts in the Corsican mafia. The Corsican mobsters then processed the morphine into heroin using an elaborate network of clandestine conversion laboratories in Marseille and smuggled the drug into Canada on cargo ships. By the early 1950s, the French Connection was supplying over a hundred kilograms of heroin per month to North America.

=== Beqaa Valley ===
The Beqaa Valley, a fertile valley in east Lebanon and one of the country's most important farming regions, is also known for being one of the most important cannabis cultivating regions in the Middle East. In certain parts of the region, life is structured around extended clan families, a number of whom are active in criminal activities such as narcotics trafficking, kidnapping for ransom and car theft. Due to the vast international Lebanese diaspora and along with a certain amount of organised criminals active in their respective communities, the Beqaa Valley has become one of the most infamous marijuana and hashish exporting regions in the world.

== International activity ==
=== Australia ===
Lebanese organised crime was introduced in Australia after the mass immigration of Lebanese people after the Lebanese Civil War in the 1970s to the end of the 1980s. Prior to the war, the Lebanese community in Australia was overwhelmingly Christian (mostly Maronites) who had been coming to Australia since the 1880s. The wartime immigration lead to a large Muslim community moving to Australia for the first time. The main centre of Lebanese organised crime is Sydney, with a significant community of 120,000, followed by Melbourne. Criminal organisations are mostly based around extended crime families with a large number of associates from their community, such as the Alameddines who are Sunnis originally from the Miniyeh region in North Lebanon. The main activities of Lebanese gangs in Australia are narcotics and weapons trafficking, extortion, prostitution, car theft and money laundering. Often different rival criminal families are interlocked in feuds (e.g. Alameddine VS Hamze), resulting in a fair amount of violence. Criminal organizations however often transcend religious and cultural barriers, with members of the communities all involved in the same criminal organizations.

=== Canada ===
Lebanese organized crime has a presence in the Montreal area. On 6 April 2017, eleven people affiliated with a Lebanese drug clan were arrested in Montreal and Laval as part of Project Affliction, a ten-month investigation by the SPVM. 32 kilograms of cocaine and 42 legal firearms were also seized by police. The clan transported the drug into Quebec by air, accumulated $3 million in monthly revenue, and supplied some of the cocaine sold by the Hells Angels and the Italian mafia in the greater Montreal area.

=== Germany ===
In analogy with Australia, Lebanese organised crime also came to Germany following the Lebanese Civil War. A large number of former Lebanese citizens immigrated to several major German cities under political asylum and refugee status. Compared to the Lebanese population in Australia, a much larger number of Lebanese people are in Germany and have traditionally settled in large numbers in Lebanese regions such as Tripoli, the Beqaa Valley and Beirut where they have integral part of the country's Sunni community. Under a large number of refugees, there were also several extended clans that already in Lebanon were deeply entrenched in organized crime. In Germany, these clans mostly settled in Berlin, Bremen and Essen where they became involved in narcotics trafficking, weapons trafficking, extortion, prostitution, illegal gambling, car theft, money laundering and armed robbery. Some of the more notorious Lebanese mafia families include the infamous el-koura Younes Clan, the Al-Qulaytat Tribe from Marwahin and Yarine, Shams Clan the Al Zein Clan and the Miri Clan from Bremen. These criminal organizations are mostly based around extended criminal clans.

=== Tri-Border Area ===
The Triple Frontier, a tri-border area along the junction of Paraguay, Argentina, and Brazil, is often used by Lebanese groups connected to political parties but also by Lebanese Shia militant group Hezbollah and Lebanese Mafia groups as a haven for smuggling and money laundering.

=== United States ===
Two rival Lebanese crime families, the Michaels family and the Leisure family, emerged in St. Louis, Missouri from the remnants of the Cuckoo Gang, a bootlegging and gambling outfit which operated during the Prohibition era. The gangs were also referred to as Syrian as "the area of Lebanon from which they emigrated had been part of Syria". The Syrian-Lebanese crime families in St. Louis were affiliated with and under the control of the Italian-American St. Louis crime family headed by Anthony Giordano. After Giordano's death from cancer on August 29, 1980, the Michaels and Leisure families entered into open warfare with one another.

== Notable Lebanese ==
- Mick Hawi, Lebanese-Australian crime boss of the Comanchero Motorcycle Club
- John Ibrahim, Lebanese-Australian gangster
- Ayman Saied Joumaa, Lebanese-Colombian drug kingpin
- Michael Kanaan, Lebanese-Australian gangster
- Louis Litif, Lebanese-American gangster
- Tony Mokbel, Lebanese-Australian gangster
- Tarek Zahed, Lebanese-Australian gangster and Comanchero member

== See also ==
- Sword Boys
