= Notorious =

Notorious may refer to:

- Infamy, notoriety gained from a negative incident or reputation

== Arts, entertainment, and media ==
=== Films ===
- Notorious (1946 film), a thriller directed by Alfred Hitchcock
- Notorious (1992 film), a TV film remake of the 1946 film, directed by Colin Bucksey
- Notorious (2009 film), a biopic about The Notorious B.I.G. (Biggie Smalls)

=== Literature ===
- Notoriety (play) 1791 comedy play by Frederic Reynolds
- Notorious (novel), second book in The It Girl series (2006)
- Notorious, romance novel by Iris Johansen (1990)
- Notorious, autobiography by Raphael Rowe (2021)
- Notorious, a novel by Gordon Korman (2021)

=== Music ===
==== Operas ====
- Notorious (opera), an opera by Hans Gefors based on Alfred Hitchcock 1946 film

==== Albums ====
- Notorious (Adelitas Way album), 2017
- Notorious (Buried in Verona album)
- Notorious (Confederate Railroad album)
- Notorious (Donald D album)
- Notorious (Duran Duran album)
- Notorious (Joan Jett album), 1991
- Notorious (soundtrack), the OST to the 2009 film

==== Songs ====
- "Notorious" (Duran Duran song), 1986 single by Duran Duran
- "Notorious" (The Saturdays song), from the 2011 album On Your Radar
- "Notorious" (Loverboy song), a song by Loverboy from the 1987 album Wildside

=== Television ===
- Notorious (2004 TV series), an American documentary series
- Notorious (2016 TV series), an American drama series
- "Notorious" (The Best Years episode)

=== Video games ===
- Notoriety (Roblox experience), Roblox video game

== Other uses ==
- Notorious Motorcycle Club (Australia), a pseudo-motorcycle gang in Sydney, Australia
- Notorious Motorcycle Club (Germany), an outlaw motorcycle club
- Notorious (ship), a 2012 replica 15th century caravel

== See also ==
- Notoriety (1922 film), an American silent film
- Notoriety (2013 film), an Iranian movie
- The Notorious B.I.G. (1972–1997), American hip hop artist
- "Notorious", Conor McGregor's nickname
