= Ayik =

Ayık is a given name for males and a surname. Notable people with the surname include:

== Surname Ayık ==
- Ahmet Ayık, Turkish sport wrestler
- Onur Ayık, Turkish-German footballer

== Surname Ayik ==
- Arop Yor Ayik, Sudanese academic
- Hakan Ayik, Turkish-Australian criminal
