= Notorious Motorcycle Club =

Notorious Motorcycle Club may refer to two different, unaffiliated outlaw motorcycle clubs:

- Notorious Motorcycle Club (Australia), a motorcycle club formerly based in Sydney, New South Wales, Australia
- Notorious Motorcycle Club (Germany), a motorcycle club based in Velbert, North Rhine-Westphalia, Germany
