= Mick Murray (leader) =

Australian outlaw biker

Michael Murray
- Born: 1978 (age 47–48); Melbourne, Victoria, Australia
- Occupation: Outlaw biker
- Known for: National president of the Comanchero
- Predecessor: Mark Buddle
- Successor: Allan Meehan
- Allegiance: Comanchero MC
- Conviction: Contempt of court (2018)
- Penalty: 8 months imprisonment

Michael "Mick" Murray (born 1978) is an Australian outlaw biker, businessman and alleged gangster.

== National president ==
As an young man, Murray joined the Comanchero Motorcycle Club and rose to become the president of the Melbourne chapter. Murray is a prominent businessman in Melbourne who owned the Nitro Gym in Hallam and a tattoo parlor. The Australian journalist Padraic Murphy described Murray as a "feared hardman". In October 2010, he and Mark Buddle were charged with affray (fighting in public) after a brawl with Alen Sarkis and David Lima of the Notorious Motorcycle Club in Bondi. In February 2014, he was charged with assault in connection with a road rage incident. In March 2014, he was charged after a police raid on home led to the seizure of guns, drugs, and some $89, 000 Australian dollars in cash. After Mark Buddle fled Australia in 2016, Murray served as the acting national president of the Comanchero. Murray is described as being the Comanchero leader. There was much tension between Murray who ran the Comanchero from Melbourne vs. Buddle who attempted to run the Comanchero from his exile in Dubai.

In March 2017, Murray was summoned before the Office of the Chief Examiner of Victoria State to answer questions about allegations that he was involved in organised crime. Murray told the Chief Examiner: "Mate, I’m not gunna waste anyone’s time. I’m not answering any questions today. I’m not lagging anyone, so you’re wasting your time and mine. If you’re gunna charge me, give me my charges this morning and that’s it. I’m not answering anything. Mate, this place is the worst-kept secret in Melbourne. Everyone knows who’s been to the Crimes Commission. Everyone knows who talks about these types of things. This is not a secret. You guys can try and keep it a secret. It’s not." In August 2017, internal tensions within the Comanchero led to a brawl at the Capital Men's Club strip club in Canberra between the Victoria and New South Wales chapters. The journalist Tammy Mills wrote: "Murray can be seen on CCTV footage standing in the background watching the affray and making no attempt to control the situation".

In December 2017, he and his wife Debbie Pittman were faced with bankruptcy after facing a demand to repay $3.72 million Australian dollars in back taxes. Around about the same time, Pittman left him because of his "repeated infidelities". In early 2018, the Comanchero appeared to be under attack with the former national president Mick Hawi being murdered on 15 February 2018 while Murray's right-hand man Robert Ale was almost killed during a shooting at the Nitro Ink tattoo parlor. The shooting of Ale was described as part of an internal struggle within the Comanchero. The police warned Murray that a contract had been placed on his life. In March 2018, Murray was jailed for contempt of court after he refused to co-operate with the chief examiner of Victoria state in March 2017. Chief Justice Peter Riordan of the Victoria Supreme Court jailed Murray for 8 months, saying that his refusal to be sworn in was "“deliberate and flagrant”.

== Legal issues ==
In August 2019 while living on bail while he faced fraud charges, Murray was allowed to leave Australia for a vacation in Thailand, but was refused entry into Thailand. The decision to allow Murray while living on bail to leave Australia was controversial in Victoria with Michael O'Brien of the Victoria Liberal Party saying: "We are clearly seeing real problems in our justice system here in Victoria where a bikie not only gets bail, but has it relaxed so he can travel overseas." In November 2021, Murray along with John Voitin, Richie Graham and Debbie Pitman was charged with tax evasion that they were alleged to have committed between August 2014 to March 2018. On 28 April 2022, Murray was arrested and charged with first degree murder in connection with the slaying of Mitat Rasimi in Dandenong in 2019. Rasimi was murdered on 3 March 2019, being shot dead inside of his car. Rasimi was said to be debt to the Comanchero. On 9 November 2022, at a preliminary hearing (the Australian equivalent of an American grand jury) the tax evasion charges were thrown out by Magistrate Keiran Gilligan who ruled that the Crown had failed to present sufficient evidence of tax evasion for the case to go to trial.

After Murray's arrest, the Sydney chapter president Allan Meehan replaced him as national president. Mark Lauchs of the Queensland's University of Technology told the media: "They’ve been running from Sydney, but they’ve been getting a lot of harassment. So there’s been a lot of police activity against the Comancheros and their associates in the last two weeks. It’s going to be a lot easier to run it from Melbourne than from Sydney because he doesn’t have to worry about anti-association laws."
