= Bayside High School (Australia) =

Public co-educational secondary school in Kogarah, New South Wales, Australia

Location
- 800 Princes Highway; Kogarah, New South Wales, 2217; Australia; 33.9661°S 151.1372°E

Information
- Type: Government secondary school
- Motto: Seizing Opportunities, Shaping Futures
- Established: 27 January 2026; 9 months ago
- Status: Open
- Educational authority: New South Wales Department of Education
- School code: 8933
- Principal: Sophie Kapsimalis
- Grades: 7–12
- Gender: Co-educational
- Campuses: Middle school (Years 7–9); Senior school (Years 10–12)
- Campus type: Suburban (dual-campus)
- Colours: Navy, white, and light blue
- Predecessors: James Cook Boys Technology High School; Moorefield Girls High School
- Website: bayside-h.schools.nsw.gov.au

Bayside High School is a government-funded, co-educational secondary school located at 800 Princes Highway in Kogarah, New South Wales, Australia. Established on 27 January 2026, the school was formed through the amalgamation of James Cook Boys Technology High School and Moorefield Girls High School, two neighbouring single-sex public high schools that had operated independently in the St George district since the 1950s.

Administered by the New South Wales Department of Education (school code 8933), the school provides secondary education for students from Years 7 to 12 across a stage-based, dual-campus model. The middle school (Years 7–9) occupies the former James Cook Boys Technology High School site, while the senior school (Years 10–12) occupies the adjacent former Moorefield Girls High School site. Bayside High School commenced operations at the start of Term 1 in 2026 under foundation principal Sophie Kapsimalis.

== History ==
=== Predecessor institutions (1956–2025) ===
Bayside High School occupies the historic grounds of two single-sex secondary schools established in the post-war expansion of Sydney's southern suburbs. James Cook Boys Technology High School opened in 1956—originally under the name Moorefield Boys High School—followed by Moorefield Girls High School in 1957. Both campuses were developed on land formerly occupied by the Moorefield Racecourse, a thoroughbred racing venue that operated in Kogarah from 1888 until its closure and subdivision in 1951.

For nearly seven decades, the two schools provided separate secondary education for boys and girls in the St George area. In April 1970, the boys' campus hosted a royal visit by Queen Elizabeth II during the bicentenary commemorations of James Cook's landing at nearby Botany Bay. Despite operating under separate administrations and distinct school traditions, the two neighbouring institutions maintained regular links through shared sporting carnivals, joint cultural events, and collaborative senior study arrangements. Both schools completed their final year of independent operation in December 2025 ahead of formal consolidation.

=== Community consultation and merger decision ===
The establishment of Bayside High School formed part of a NSW Government policy initiative aimed at guaranteeing access to co-educational public secondary schooling for all families across New South Wales. In 2024, the NSW Department of Education conducted a formal community consultation examining secondary educational offerings in the Kogarah–Rockdale area, gathering submissions and survey responses from local parents, students, staff, and feeder primary school communities.

Departmental reporting indicated that approximately 65 per cent of surveyed local primary school communities favoured a co-educational secondary setting. Within the existing school communities, more than two-thirds of parents and carers at James Cook Boys Technology High School and nearly half of those at Moorefield Girls High School either preferred co-education or expressed no preference.

In November 2024, the NSW Government formally announced the amalgamation of the two Kogarah schools into a single co-educational institution, alongside parallel transitions at several other single-sex public high schools in Sydney. While the broader state policy prompted public discussion regarding the preservation of single-sex public school choices, education officials stated that merging the two Kogarah campuses would address historical enrolment imbalances, consolidate specialist teaching staff, and expand senior subject choices.

=== Establishment and 2026 opening ===
During 2025, a joint transition committee comprising departmental officials, school executives, parents, and student representatives coordinated the operational merger, including the selection of the school's name, motto, and uniform. The name Bayside High School was adopted to reflect the school's location within the Bayside Council local government area and its proximity to Botany Bay.

Sophie Kapsimalis was appointed foundation principal to lead the newly formed institution. Bayside High School officially opened on 27 January 2026 for the commencement of Term 1, joining other newly transitioned co-educational public high schools in New South Wales that year, including Asquith High School and Hornsby High School.

== Campuses and infrastructure ==
Bayside High School operates across two contiguous campuses situated on the Princes Highway in Kogarah, located within walking distance of Kogarah railway station and adjacent to the TAFE NSW St George campus.

=== Dual-campus structure ===
The school employs a stage-based campus model designed to tailor learning environments to student developmental stages:

- Middle School Campus (Years 7–9): Occupying the northern site (the former James Cook Boys Technology High School), the middle school accommodates junior secondary students across NESA Stages 4 and 5. The campus focuses on the transition from primary to secondary schooling, foundational literacy and numeracy, and introductory technological studies.
- Senior School Campus (Years 10–12): Occupying the southern site (the former Moorefield Girls High School), the senior school accommodates students in Stages 5 and 6, including candidates preparing for the Higher School Certificate (HSC). The campus features dedicated senior study spaces, seminar facilities, and career transition support services.

=== Infrastructure redevelopment ===
To integrate the two former single-sex campuses into a unified co-educational facility, School Infrastructure NSW initiated a multi-stage capital works and refurbishment programme.

Works completed prior to and during the school's inaugural 2026 academic year included:

- Construction of a new covered walkway improving pedestrian connectivity across the site.
- Refurbishment and modernisation of general learning classrooms.
- Construction of two new science laboratories and an additional science learning space.
- Comprehensive upgrades to student amenities, including toilets and physical education changing facilities.
- Modernisation of administrative areas, campus security infrastructure, and public-address systems.

Subsequent works—comprising electrical infrastructure upgrades, refurbished science, technology, engineering, and mathematics (STEM) spaces, commercial food technology kitchens, and Technological and Applied Studies (TAS) workshops—progressed through late 2026, with full project completion forecast by School Infrastructure NSW for early to mid-2027.

== Curriculum and student support ==
Bayside High School delivers the mandatory and elective curricula prescribed by the New South Wales Education Standards Authority (NESA) from Year 7 to Year 12, structured around an explicit-teaching instructional framework.

- Junior Secondary (Years 7–10): Students undertake core coursework in English, Mathematics, Science, Human Society and Its Environment (History and Geography), Personal Development, Health and Physical Education (PDHPE), Creative and Performing Arts, Languages, and Technological and Applied Studies, leading to the Record of School Achievement (RoSA) at the completion of Year 10.
- Senior Secondary (Years 11–12): Consolidating the student cohorts and teaching faculties of both predecessor schools expanded the breadth of Stage 6 subjects available on site. Senior students may pursue HSC pathways across humanities, extension mathematics, sciences, creative arts, and Vocational Education and Training (VET) frameworks.

=== Specialist programmes ===
- High Potential and Gifted Education (HPGE): Through its Inspire HPGE framework, the school provides differentiated extension classes, academic competitions, and enrichment activities across intellectual, creative, social-emotional, and physical domains.
- Inclusive Education and Support Unit: The school operates dedicated support classes for students with autism and intellectual disabilities, alongside learning support teams and English as an Additional Language or Dialect (EAL/D) specialists.

== School identity and co-curricular life ==
=== Ethos and uniform ===
The school's motto, Seizing Opportunities, Shaping Futures, is paired with three core institutional values: Ambition, Adaptability, and Achievement.

The school's official uniform palette consists of navy blue, white, and light blue, incorporating interchangeable junior and senior academic and sports garments developed in consultation with students and families. During the transition period, students were permitted to continue wearing existing uniforms from James Cook Boys Technology High School or Moorefield Girls High School.

=== Co-curricular activities ===
Bayside High School offers a range of extra-curricular and leadership programmes, including:

- Sport: Weekly grade and knockout competitions administered through the Combined High Schools (CHS) sporting association, alongside annual school swimming, athletics, and cross-country carnivals.
- STEM and Innovation: Extracurricular clubs covering robotics, coding, 3D printing, and an on-campus STEM garden initiative.
- Creative Arts and Leadership: School concert band, drama and performance showcases, public speaking, debating, and student governance through the Student Representative Council (SRC).

== Governance and leadership ==
Upon opening in 2026, the school's senior executive leadership team comprised:

Senior Executive Team (2026)
Role	Name
Principal	Sophie Kapsimalis
Deputy Principal	Karen-Maia Jackaman
Deputy Principal	Sophie Plibersek
Deputy Principal	Benjamin Yelavich

== Local intake area ==
To align enrolment boundaries following the 2026 amalgamation, the NSW Department of Education established a dedicated local intake area for Bayside High School within the St George region. The designated catchment encompasses the local intake areas of four public primary feeder schools:

- Arncliffe Public School
- Brighton-Le-Sands Public School
- Kyeemagh Public School
- Carlton South Public School (eastern portion)

== See also ==
- James Cook Boys Technology High School
- Moorefield Girls High School
- List of government schools in New South Wales
- Education in New South Wales
