= James Cook Boys Technology High School =

Location
- 800 Princes Highway; Kogarah, New South Wales, 2217; Australia; 33.9661°S 151.1372°E

Information
- Former name: Moorefield Boys High School
- Type: Government secondary school
- Motto: Latin: Ignotum Quaerite (Seek the Unknown)
- Established: 1956
- Status: Closed (amalgamated)
- Closed: 2025
- Sister school: Moorefield Girls High School
- Educational authority: New South Wales Department of Education
- Grades: 7–12
- Gender: Boys
- Campus type: Suburban
- Successor: Bayside High School (2026–present)

James Cook Boys Technology High School was a government-funded, single-sex secondary school for boys located on the Princes Highway in Kogarah, New South Wales, Australia. Established in 1956 as Moorefield Boys High School, it served the St George district of southern Sydney for nearly 70 years before closing as an independent school at the end of 2025.

The school was named in honour of British navigator James Cook, whose 1770 voyage along the eastern coastline of Australia became an important part of the school's historical identity. It adopted its final name in 1990, reflecting its designation as a technology-focused high school.

From Term 1 2026, James Cook Boys Technology High School and the neighbouring Moorefield Girls High School were amalgamated to establish Bayside High School, a co-educational government secondary school operating across the former campuses of both schools.

== History ==
=== Establishment and early years ===
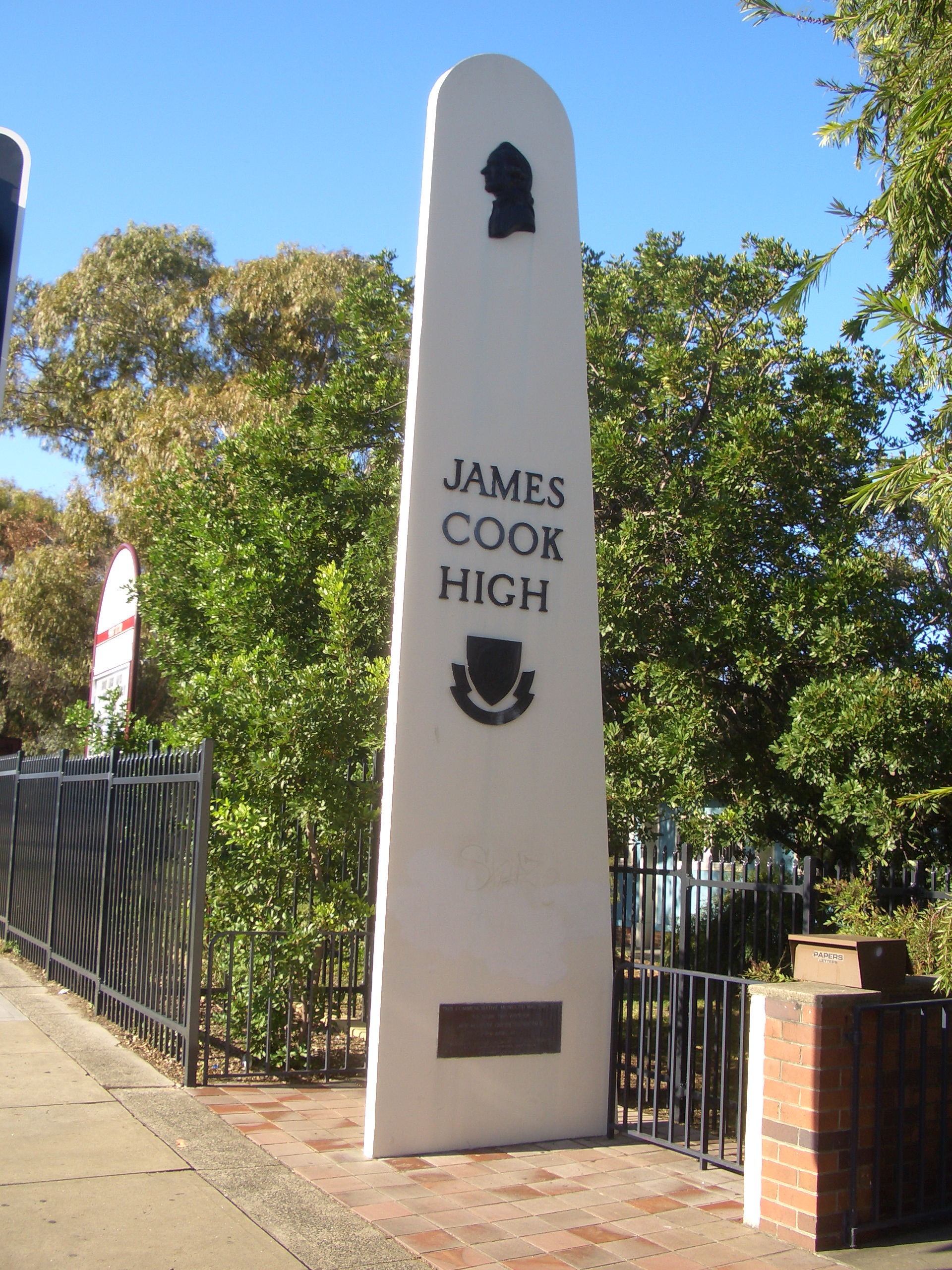
Entrance sign of James Cook Boys Technology High School

James Cook Boys Technology High School was established in 1956 on land formerly occupied by Moorefield Racecourse in Kogarah. Following the closure and redevelopment of the racecourse, portions of the land were allocated for educational institutions and residential development.

The former racecourse precinct became home to several educational facilities, including James Cook Boys Technology High School, Moorefield Girls High School, St George School for students with disabilities, and facilities associated with TAFE NSW.

The school originally opened as Moorefield Boys High School in 1956. It underwent subsequent name changes before adopting the name James Cook Boys Technology High School in 1990.

The school's association with James Cook reflected the historical significance of the nearby Botany Bay, where Cook and the crew of HMS Endeavour landed in April 1770.

=== Royal visit in 1970 ===
On 29 April 1970, Queen Elizabeth II visited the school during commemorations marking the bicentenary of James Cook's arrival on Australia's eastern coastline.

The royal visit was commemorated by a monument presented to the school by St George County Council. A historical photograph held by Georges River Libraries records the presentation of the commemorative monument by council chairman Alderman C. C. W. Nairn alongside school principal A. F. Jones.

The visit occurred during the 1970 bicentenary celebrations, which marked 200 years since Cook's voyage along Australia's east coast.

=== Development as a technology high school ===
In 1990, the school adopted the name James Cook Boys Technology High School, reflecting its transition towards a technology-focused secondary education model.

The school provided secondary education for boys from Years 7 to 12, delivering the NSW curriculum alongside practical and vocational learning opportunities.

Students undertaking senior secondary studies could participate in vocational education and training (VET) courses, including pathways towards apprenticeships and further education.

The school also maintained sporting, recreational and extracurricular programmes throughout its history.

=== Enrolment and educational challenges ===
During the 2010s, the school experienced declining enrolments.

According to the school's 2016 annual report, student enrolment decreased from 377 in 2013 to 310 in 2014, 262 in 2015 and 229 in 2016.

In 2015, declining enrolments at the school were raised in the Parliament of New South Wales. Parliamentary discussion highlighted concerns about the school's reputation and its ability to attract local students, with enrolment having fallen below 300 students.

=== Transition to co-educational schooling ===
In 2023, the New South Wales Department of Education undertook community consultation concerning secondary school options in the Kogarah–Rockdale area.

The consultation examined preferences for single-sex and co-educational schooling and considered the future of James Cook Boys Technology High School and neighbouring Moorefield Girls High School.

The results indicated substantial support for co-educational secondary education, particularly among families with children attending local primary schools. Approximately 65 per cent of surveyed local primary school communities indicated a preference for co-educational schooling.

Following the consultation, the NSW Government announced that James Cook Boys Technology High School and Moorefield Girls High School would be amalgamated to form a new co-educational secondary school from 2026.

The amalgamation formed part of a wider NSW Government initiative to expand access to co-educational public secondary schooling.

=== Closure and amalgamation ===
James Cook Boys Technology High School completed its final year as a separate school in December 2025, ending nearly seven decades of independent operation.

The school was amalgamated with Moorefield Girls High School to create Bayside High School, which officially commenced operations on the first day of Term 1 in 2026.

The newly established school adopted a co-educational model for students from Years 7 to 12. The former James Cook Boys Technology High School campus became the middle school for Years 7–9, while the former Moorefield Girls High School campus became the senior school for Years 10–12.

The transition was accompanied by infrastructure upgrades across the combined campus, including improvements to learning spaces, science facilities, amenities and administration areas. Further works were scheduled to continue into 2027.

The new co-educational school opened under principal Sophie Kapsimalis.

Although the former institution ceased to exist independently, its campus continued to be used for public secondary education as part of Bayside High School.

== School statistics ==
=== Enrolment history ===
The school's enrolment fluctuated throughout its history, with a notable decline during the mid-2010s.

Student enrolment, 2013–2017
Year	Boys	Girls	Total
2013	377	0	377
2014	310	0	310
2015	262	0	262
2016	229	0	229
2017	245	0	245

Sources: NSW Department of Education annual reports for 2016 and 2017.

=== Student background in 2015 ===
In 2015, the school enrolled 262 students, all of whom were boys.

Student characteristics, 2015
Measure	Value
Total enrolment	262
Boys	262
Girls	0
Full-time equivalent enrolment	262
Indigenous students	1%
Students from a language background other than English	88%

=== Socio-educational background in 2015 ===
The school's 2015 Index of Community Socio-Educational Advantage (ICSEA) value was reported as 974, compared with the Australian average of 1,000.

Reported ICSEA distribution, 2015
Socio-educational quarter	School distribution	Australian distribution
Bottom quarter	46%	25%
Lower-middle quarter	26%	25%
Upper-middle quarter	20%	25%
Top quarter	9%	25%

Percentages are rounded and may not total 100 per cent.

=== Staffing in 2015 ===
Reported school staffing, 2015
Staff category	Number
Teaching staff	34
Full-time equivalent teaching staff	29.3
Non-teaching staff	7
Full-time equivalent non-teaching staff	6.6

=== Vocational education and training ===
The school offered vocational education and training opportunities to senior students as part of its secondary education programme.

In 2014, the school reported 46 VET enrolments and one school-based apprenticeship or traineeship.

== Sport and extracurricular activities ==
James Cook Boys Technology High School participated in a range of school sporting competitions and recreational programmes.

=== Summer sports ===
Regular summer sports included cricket, basketball, baseball, squash, table tennis, touch football, volleyball and modified soccer.

=== Winter sports ===
Winter sporting activities included baseball, rugby league, soccer, softball, table tennis, tennis and Australian rules football.

=== Recreational activities ===
The school also offered non-grade sporting and recreational activities, including fitness programmes, senior recreation and action sports. Activities included soccer, basketball, table tennis, tennis, volleyball and touch football.

== Relationship with Moorefield Girls High School ==
Throughout much of their history, James Cook Boys Technology High School and Moorefield Girls High School operated as neighbouring single-sex secondary schools on the former Moorefield Racecourse site.

The schools maintained a close relationship, participating in joint educational and extracurricular activities.

These included multicultural events, student leadership activities and some combined senior secondary classes for Years 11 and 12.

Students from the two schools also participated in Crossroads, a personal development and health education programme for senior secondary students.

The institutions remained administratively separate until the end of 2025, when both schools completed their final year of independent operation.

From Term 1 2026, their campuses became part of the newly established co-educational Bayside High School.

== Notable alumni ==
The following individuals have been identified as former students of James Cook Boys Technology High School or its predecessor institutions.

- Hakan Ayik – Australian criminal figure associated with international organised crime.
- Colin Bennett – soccer player.
- Greg Child – rock climber and mountaineer.
- Trevor Edwards – Anglican bishop and former Assistant Bishop of Canberra and Goulburn.
- Mike Grbevski – soccer player.
- George Harris – soccer player.
- Neville Hayes – Olympic swimmer.
- Clyde Hefer – Olympic rower.
- Steve Kamper – Australian politician and member of the New South Wales Legislative Assembly for Rockdale.
- Ivan Lee – Anglican bishop.
- Brad Mackay – rugby league player.
- David Niu – rugby league and rugby union player.
- Robert Proctor – field hockey player.
- Ron Riley – Olympic field hockey player.
- Mark Schulman – rugby league player.
- Brian Smith – rugby league coach.
- Geoff Smith – decathlete.
- Leigh Warren – dancer and choreographer.

== See also ==
- List of government schools in New South Wales
- Moorefield Girls High School
- Bayside High School (Australia)
- Education in Australia
- James Cook
