= Notorious Motorcycle Club (Germany) =

Outlaw motorcycle club

Notorious MC
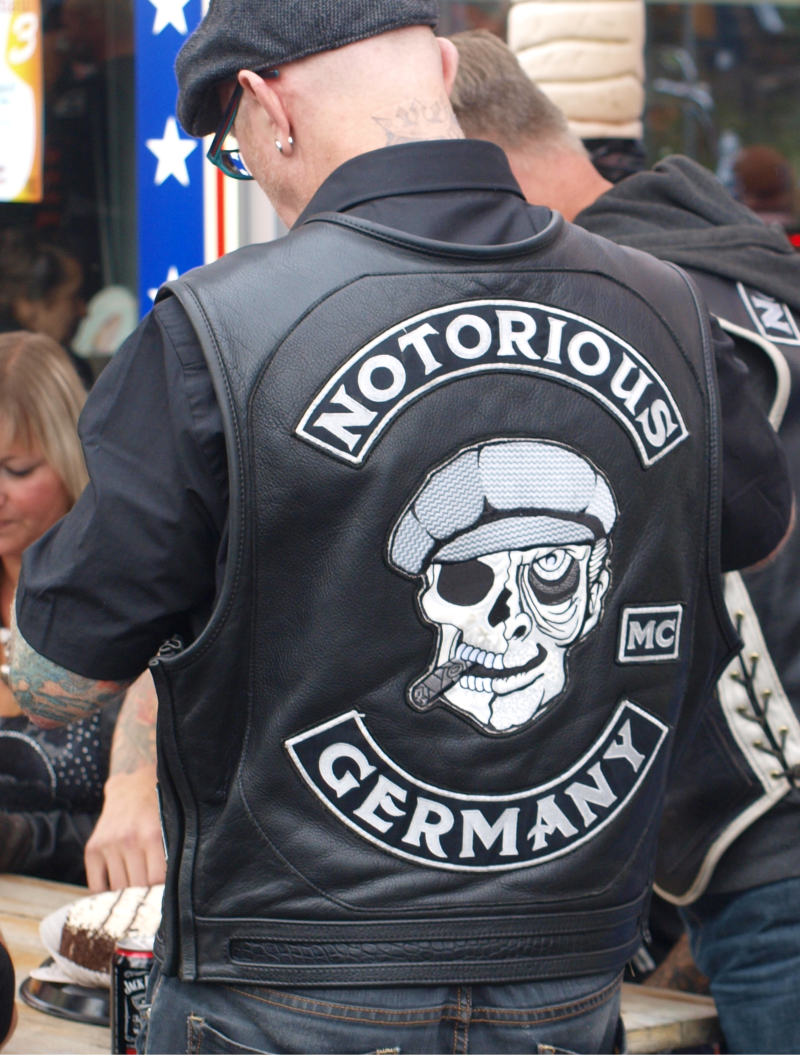
- Founded: 2013
- Founding location: Velbert, North Rhine-Westphalia, Germany
- Years active: 2013 to now
- Territory: Germany, Canada, England, Spain
- Membership: 100–150
- Allies: Unknown
- Rivals: Unknown

Notorious is an 1% outlaw motorcycle club based in Germany. Its emblem is the split head of a gangster, one half a human face, the other half a skull, which symbolizes on one side the family life from the past, and on the other side loyalty to the death.

They had been fighting with other motorcycle gangs in their areas.

Another outlaw motorcycle club called the Notorious existed in Australia until 2012.

== Overview ==
=== Creation ===
The club was founded in Germany by three friends, with the La Mesa Charter being opened in August 2013, along with a Nomads Charter around the same time. The club established further charters in Germany in later years. The club expanded outside of the Germany in 2015, opening a Nomads Charter in Canada. In 2017 they formed the London Charter in England.

They are largely an independent club, with no known strong ties to any major clubs.

=== Members ===
The exact number of members is unknown to police but sources claim the club has 100 to 150 active members.

== See also ==
- Comancheros
- Rebels Motorcycle Club
