= Duax Ngakuru =

New Zealand outlaw biker

“Dax” Hohepa Ngakuru
- Born: 1980 (age 45–46); Rotorua, Rotorua Lakes District, New Zealand
- Occupation: Outlaw biker
- Known for: National president of the Comanchero
- Predecessor: Mick Hawi
- Successor: Mark Buddle
- Allegiance: Comanchero MC

Duax "Dax" Hohepa Ngakuru (born 1980) is a New Zealand outlaw biker and alleged gangster.

== Comanchero national president ==
Ngakuru was born in Rotorua, but grew up in Sydney. He went to high school along with his alleged conspirator Hakan “Big Hux” Ayik. He joined the Comanchero Motorcycle Club and rose up during the presidency of Mick Hawi. He uses various aliases such as the Negotiator, Bullseye, Chuck Norris and El Mito (The Myth). In 2009 after Hawi's arrest on charges of first degree murder, Ngakuru became the new "supreme commander" of the Comanchero. On 29 December 2010, a tattoo parlor owned by Ngakuru in Coogee was bombed. At the time, the Comanchero were involved in a dispute with the Notorious Motorcycle Club and the bombing of Ngakuru's tattoo shop was believed to be related to the dispute. The dispute started in the spring of 2010 when the Comanchero kidnapped a Notorious drug dealer and forced him to reveal where a slash of Chinese heroin was hidden, which the Comanchero took for themselves. As the heroin from China was worth $25 million Australian dollars, the loss was a sizable one to the Notorious gang, which started the biker war.

== In exile ==
In 2011, he fled Australia to Turkey, where he settled in self-imposed exile. After his flight, Mark Buddle replaced him as the Comanchero national president. The New Zealand Herald reported in 2023 about Ngakuru: "He’s accused of being behind some of the world’s biggest drug deals and is reportedly controlling business from Turkey, with an estimated wealth of more than $100 million". In 2021, it was revealed that Ngakuru was sending texts on the ANOM messaging service that, unbeknownst to him, were being read by the police in Australia and New Zealand. In one of his texts, Ngakuru wrote that he had such "power and influence" in Turkey that he felt he was immune to arrest. In another text, Ngakuru wrote that he felt he was “being able to get away with murder”.

Unbeknownst to Ngakuru the ANOM encrypted messaging service he used was owned by the Federal Bureau of Investigation (FBI) and all of his texts were read by the FBI. The FBI secretly purchased control of the ANOM messaging platform and installed a "backdoor" on the app that allowed the FBI to read millions of supposedly secure encrypted texts in Operation Trojan Shield. Using information gained by the ANOM texts, the New Zealand police launched Operation Spyglass in 2021 that led to the seizure of 9 kilograms of methamphetamine plus four guns, 14 vehicles and motorbikes, a large amount of cannabis and more than $1 million New Zealand dollars in cash.. After Mark Buddle was extradited from Turkey to Australia in August 2022, Ngakuru was reported to have resumed his role as the Comanchero "supreme commander". In October 2022, Ngakuru's cousin, Shane Ngakuru was arrested in Thailand on charges of being a "super-facilitator" between the Comanchero and the Asian crime syndicates in Southeast Asia. A New Zealand police report defined the term as "A super-facilitator has links to a global network of manufacturers and supply and distribution chains to successfully import methamphetamine to New Zealand. The super-facilitator is usually based offshore and is never in direct contact with the shipment."

In January 2023, he was arrested in Turkey and it was reported that Turkish authorities were in talks for Ngakuru's possible extradition to Australia or New Zealand. At the time of his arrest, a series of photographs were released which showed Ngakuru having dinner in a posh Istanbul restaurant with Hawi and Ayik. Another photograph showed Ngakuru on a luxury yacht in the Bosporus under a giant Turkish flag. Together with Hakan Ayik, Ngakuru was alleged to have run from Istanbul a crime empire that was active in the Netherlands, Australia, New Zealand, South Africa, South Korea and Hong Kong. At the time of his arrest, Ngakuru was living in a villa in the Sarıyer district of Istanbul.

== Books ==
- Morton, James; Lobez, Susanna (2011). Gangland Sydney. Melbourne: Melbourne University Publishing. ISBN 9780522860399.
