= Tarek Zahed =

Lebanese-Australian outlaw biker

Tarek Zahed (born 21 June 1980) is a Sydney-based Lebanese-Australian organised crime figure. He is an alleged member, and former sergeant-at-arms, of the Comanchero Motorcycle Club.

== The Comanchero ==
Zahed was born in Sydney to a Lebanese family. His parents were refugees from the Lebanese Civil War.

In 1995, he was convicted of assault and of resisting arrest, marking his first major convictions. In 2001, he was again convicted of assault after unleashing his dogs to maul a woman in a road rage incident. In 2004, he was again convicted of assault after stomping on a man's head so hard that he fractured his skull during a drug deal gone bad. In 2009, he began an association with the Comanchero Motorcycle Club, which he later joined. In 2011, he was convicted of attempted murder after shooting a man. He rose to become the national sergeant-at-arms of the Comanchero, in charge of enforcing discipline.

Assistant Commissioner of the New South Wales police Michael Fitzgerald called Zahed a leader in "Australia's largest criminal organisation". Zahed was described as a loyalist to the Comanchero national president and "supreme commander" Mark Buddle. Zahed is known for wearing expensive clothing, which has led the Australian media to dub him the "Balenciaga Bikie" and the "Gucci Gangster". In 2020, he was convicted of living off the proceeds of crime after thousands of dollars were found in bank accounts registered in the name of his children. On 16 January 2021, he was charged with affray after being recorded by security cameras punching and slapping around a rival, Mohamed Aouli, in the bathroom of an Italian restaurant, a’Mare, in Barangaroo. On 10 February 2021, Zahed made a plea bargain with the Crown where he pledged guilty to using violence to inspire fear in exchange for him paying a $1,000 Australian dollar fine and the charges of affray being dropped. Justice Graeme Hanson who accepted the plea bargain stated that Zahed was not a good citizen when sentencing him.

In July 2021, Zahed attempted to leave Australia for a trip to Turkey and Lebanon, which led to the Australian Federal Police issuing an Interpol green notice against him, which claimed he was a dangerous criminal. At the time Buddle lived in self-imposed exile in Dubai and it is believed that Zahed's Middle Eastern trip was in some way connected with Buddle. The Interpol notice read: "The Comanchero group provides support to import and distribute drugs. If Zahed is permitted to enter Lebanon or Turkey, it is very likely that he will commit serious crimes and acts of violence under the Comanchero’s name". He was denied permission to enter Turkey, but in September 2021 entered Lebanon. Upon entering Lebanon, he sought Lebanese citizenship under the grounds that it was his ancestral homeland. When he landed in Beirut on 11 September 2021, he was arrested in response to the Interpol green notice against him. On 16 September 2021, he was ordered released, but was placed under restrictions. At the time, Zahed told a Beirut court that he wished to take Lebanese citizenship and did not want to return to Australia.

Despite his statements, Zahed returned to Australia later in 2021. In December 2021, he was the subject of a Serious Crime Prevention Order, which prevented him from wearing his gang colors; using encrypted texts; and placed his bank accounts under police scrutiny... To escape the order in New South Wales, Zahed moved to Melbourne in Victoria. In March 2022, he was under investigation by the Victoria state police in connection with a brawl outside of a boxing match in Kensington.

== Legal issues ==
After the arrest of Mick Murray in April 2022, a leadership struggle began within the Comanchero with the new national president being Allan Meehan who beat out Zahed for the top post. On 10 May 2022, Zahed was shot and badly wounded during a murder attempt at the Bodyfit gym in Auburn which killed his younger brother Omar. Zahed's body was described as being "shredded" as he took 10 bullets to his face, head, arms, legs, stomach and pelvis. Zahed lost his sight in his right eye as a result of his injuries. In August 2022, Meehan released a photo of himself with Zahed whom he called "“hard2kill" Zahed on his Instagram account along with the cryptic comment "Love and brotherhood. Forget what ya heard."

In August 2022, Zahed along with his younger brother Abdul Kahir Zahed were charged with first degree murder in connection with the slaying of Youssef Assoum on 11 December 2014. Assoum had been kidnapped and killed in his own car, which was found burned. Zahed's fingerprints were found inside the burned remains of Assoum's car. On 29 August 2022, Zahed while on a visit to New South Wales was arrested in Edgecliff in a dramatic downtake by the tactical police squad who shot out the windows of Zahed's car and dragged him out of his BMW after he refused to get out. Commander Danny Doherty of the New South Wales police told the media that Zahed "was non-compliant at the best of times, he was definitely non-compliant yesterday. Those beanbag rounds had to be used to get into the car to drag him out, handcuff him and put him on the footpath to have him safely arrested." Doherty stated: "We will be alleging this person is responsible for the killing of Mr. Assoum in 2014, and that his senior position in the Comanchero OMCG links him to several other matters relevant to police". Zahed was denied bail and ordered held at the Goulburn jail while awaiting his trial, which was scheduled to begin on 5 February 2024. In December 2022, a man was arrested and charged with murder and attempted murder in connection with the Auburn gym incident. In September 2023, his sister Asmahan Zahed was arrested and charged with the possession of stolen goods.

Just before their trial was due to begin on 5 February 2024, the Zahed brothers made plea bargains with the Crown. In exchange for the first degree murder charges being dropped by the Crown, Tarek Zahed pleaded guilty to hindering the discovery of evidence regarding a serious indictable offence while Abdul Kahir Zahed pleaded guilty to being an accessory after the fact to murder. In a statement of fact submitted to the court as part of the plea bargains, Tarek admitted that he had burned Assoum's car after his murder as a part of an effort to hinder the police investigation of the murder. As part of the same statement of fact, Abdul Kahir admitted that he knew who had murdered Assoum, but would not name the killers because he wished to follow the outlaw biker code of never incriminating another outlaw biker in a crime. On 11 March 2024, Zahed was sentenced to three and a half years in prison. Justice Richard Button stated in sentencing Zahed: "It is impossible to say that, but for the actions undertaken and directed by the offender, that the killer, or killers, would have been detected, convicted and punished. Even so...the actions and orders of the offender surely played some role in making the police investigation more difficult." In March 2024, media reports claimed that Zahad was reportedly disenchanted with his lifestyle as it was stated he wanted "to turn away from life in the underworld". Zahad stated that in 2014 that he knew his younger brother Abdul Kahir "were up to something" and he only burned the Assoum's car to protect his brother. A report by a prison psychologist submitted to the court had Zahad saying he wanted out of the underworld "Because I’ve got responsibilities...my wife, children and my brother’s children...my mother." As Justice Button added in the time served in jail awaiting his trial to his prison sentence, Zahed is due to be released in December 2024.
