= Allan Meehan =

Australian biker, organised crime figure and gangster

- Born: 1987 (age 38–39); Sydney, New South Wales, Australia
- Occupation: Outlaw biker
- Known for: National president of the Comanchero
- Predecessor: Mick Murray
- Successor: Bemir Saracevic
- Allegiance: Rebels MC; Comanchero MC
- Conviction: Violation of a Serious Crime Prevention Order (2023)

Allan Meehan (born 1987) is an Australian outlaw biker and alleged gangster who is the national president of the Comanchero Motorcycle Club since 2022 and still holds this title today and as of 2026 is the Comanchero world commander.

== Comanchero national president ==
Meehan was born into a poor family of Irish descent in Sydney, and grew up in a public housing estate. At the age of 18, he joined the Rebels Motorcycle Club and became the president of its Cronulla chapter before he defected over to the Comanchero Motorcycle Club. Meehan is a protégé of the Comanchero leader Mark Buddle. In 2020, he became the president of the Canberra chapter after the previous chapter president was murdered.

Meehan became the president of the Comanchero Sydney chapter. A police source told the journalist Chole Whelan: "“Most of the drugs come into Sydney and move on from there and is where the power is, although a lot of guys have moved interstate because of the pressure NSW cops keep putting on them". In November 2021, he was the subject of a Serious Crime Prevention Order issued by the New South Wales police. In April 2022, Meehan became the national president of the Comanchero after the arrest of Mick Murray. After the arrest of Murray in April 2022, a leadership struggle began within the Comanchero with the new national president being Meehan who beat out Tarek Zahed for the top post. On 10 May 2022, Zahed was shot and badly wounded during a murder attempt at the Bodyfit gym in Auburn which killed his younger brother Omar.

Superintendent Grant Taylor of the New South Wales police stated about the Serious Crime Prevention Order applied against Meehan: “He has become a primary target of the NSW Police Force and this is just one method of targeting him. We want to send a clear message. If you’re going to be the national president of the Comanchero, this is what you can expect.” In August 2022, Meehan released a photo of Zahed whom he called "“hard2kill" Zahed on his Instagram account along with the cryptic comment "Love and brotherhood. Forget what ya heard." Meehan's remark that Zahed should forget what he had heard appeared to be an effort to rebut rumors that he was behind the attempt on Zahed's life. In September 2022, one of Meehan's closest allies within the Comanchero, Kyle Leofa, was shot in the face while another Comanchero, Levi Johnson, was stabbed to death. Meehan is said to be locked into a power struggle with the former leader Murray.

== Legal issues ==
In 2023, he relocated to Queensland, which his lawyer Angus Edwards stated was "for his own safety". Edwards told a courtroom "It was known that there were threats out against anybody who was suspected to be a member of the Comancheros. My client was specifically spoken to by New South Wales police and told there was a $3 million hit on his head." At the time, Meehan was the subject of a Serious Crime Prevention Order which forbade him from associating with other members of the Comanchero, and he was arrested for failing to provide the police with his new address." In February 2023, he was extradited from Queensland to New South Wales to face charges of violating the Serious Crime Prevention Order. In March 2023, Meehan resigned as national president and was replaced with Bemir Saravec. Saravec is a protégé of Meehan and the change in leadership is not expected to be a change in policy. In a plea bargain in July 2023, Meehan pleaded guilty to violating the order.
