= Mark Buddle =

Australian outlaw biker

Mark Douglas Buddle
- Born: 1984 (age 41–42); Maroubra, New South Wales, Australia
- Occupation: Outlaw biker
- Known for: National president of the Comanchero
- Predecessor: Duax Ngakuru
- Successor: Mick Murray
- Allegiance: Comanchero MC

Mark Douglas Buddle (born 1984) is an Australian outlaw biker, criminal and an alleged gangster.

== Comancheros ==
Buddle was born in Maroubra and had what was described as a "gritty" childhood. On 7 June 2010, the security guard Gary Allibon was murdered during a robbery, and the New South Wales police view Buddle as a "person of interest" in regards to Allibon's slaying. In October 2010, Buddle along with Mick Murray were charged with affray (fighting in public) after a brawl with Alen Sarkis and David Lima of the Notorious Motorcycle Club in Bondi. In 2011, he became the national president of the Comanchero Motorcycle Club after the previous national president Duax "Dax" Ngakuru fled Australia to Turkey.

In December 2011, he was involved in an exceptionally violent brawl in Spearmint Rhino strip club in Melbourne. In December 2012, he was arrested in Queensland to be extradited to New South Wales where he was wanted on charges of being involved in a pub brawl. In January 2014, he was arrested on charges of threatening to murder a Queensland police officer in December 2012. In regard to the brawl, Buddle pleaded guilty to one count of affray (fighting in public), one count of "intentionally causing injury" and two counts of assault, for which he served 15 months in prison. In July 2015, he was arrested after being found by the Australian customs to be taking with him an undeclared sum of $60,000 Australian dollars out of the country.

== Fugitive ==
In 2016, he fled to the United Arab Emirates after he was a declared a "person of interest" to the police in connection with the murder of a security guard in 2010. Buddle appointed a committee that consisted of the national sergeant-at-arms Tarek Zahed, the Melbourne chapter president Mick Murray and Sydney chapter president Allan Meehan to run the Comanchero in his absence. From his home in Dubai, Buddle was accused of orchestrating via encrypted texts shipments of cocaine from Hong Kong into Australia. There was reported to be much tension between Buddle who attempted to run the Comanchero from his exile in Dubai vs. Murray who ran the Comanchero from Melbourne. In September 2017, Buddle sent a text message to all Comancheros saying: "I'm the fucking commander of the world...no one is to touch another member or set up another chapter without my permission". Buddle used the supposedly super-secure encrypted ANOM texting app on his cell phone to communicate. Unknown to him, the ANOM texting service was owned by the Federal Bureau of Investigation which installed a "backdoor" on the ANOM app which allowed all of the texts to be decrypted. As part of Operation Trojan Shield, the police forces of Europe, Australia and New Zealand were allowed access to the ANOM texts. In 2021, Buddle is alleged to have sent out texts calling for a "commission" similar to "the Commission" that rules the American Mafia to control the prices of drugs in Australia. In one text, Buddle is said to have complained that the price of methamphetamine had dropped from $250,000 Australian dollars per kilogram to $80,000 Australian dollars per kilogram "because there is NO STRUCTURE, no rules, no reasoning and to be honest there’s NO SENSE".

In 2021, Buddle was involved in a brawl by a poolside in Dubai and then went to Turkey to avoid charges of assault. He then settled in North Cyprus, a state only recognised by Turkey and which has no extradition treaty with Australia. Buddle was expelled from North Cyprus in July 2022 because his presence was "inconvenient in terms of public peace and security" according to a press release. Buddle is the object of intense media attention in Australia. The Australian journalist Chris Graham complained that the media tended to present Buddle as more intelligent than what he really is as he wrote: "After taking his shirt off to engage in the fight, Buddle was identified by CCTV...because his surname is tattooed across his chest (presumably so that he doesn’t forget it). Which very strongly suggests that Mr. Buddle is not the sharpest tool in the shed...Long story short, we’re not talking about master criminals here, although you could be mistaken for believing Buddle is Al Capone reincarnated if you’ve followed the breathless, fawning coverage of him in the Australian media over the past few years." Graham compared Buddle to the clownishly inept comical villain Dr. Evil from the Austin Powers films, saying that he was not the criminal genius that the media portrayed him as, and that his self-proclaimed title as the Comanchero "Supreme Commander of the World" was ridiculous.

In August 2022, he was deported from Turkey and arrested in Australia on charges of importing 160 kilograms of cocaine worth $40 million Australian dollars into Melbourne in May 2021. In 2023, Alex Vare was reported to have replaced Buddle as the new "supreme commander" of the Comancheros. Mel Terwisscha, Buddle's girlfriend and the mother of his children, announced that she left Buddle after his marriage to a Turkish Cypriot woman. Terwisscha was reported to have been "very upset" after being arrested in Bodrum. Terwisscha stated: "I haven't seen Mark for a year. He's the father of my children. They see him, I don't. My kids have gone to and from [Northern Cyprus] but I have stayed away."
