= Hells Angels MC criminal allegations and incidents in British Columbia =

The Hells Angels Motorcycle Club (HAMC), an international outlaw biker gang, has been involved in multiple crimes, alleged crimes, and violent incidents in British Columbia since its establishment in the province in 1983.

== Origins ==
In the 1960s and 1970s, the major biker gang in British Columbia were the Satan's Angels gang based in the Lower Mainland. In 1981, Yves Buteau, the national president of the Hells Angels, approached Satan's Angels with an offer to "patch over", made conditional on the Satan's Angels eliminating the other biker gangs as Buteau insisted that there be no competition with any Hells Angels chapters in British Columbia. By 1983, only the Satan's Angels of the Lower Mainland, the Tribesmen of Nanaimo and the Highwayman of Cranbrook were left. On 23 July 1983, the Satan's Angels joined the Hells Angels as "full patch" members while the Tribesmen became a prospective Hells Angels chapter and the Highwaymen became a puppet club. On 22 December 1983, the East End Vancouver chapter of the Hells Angels was opened and another chapter in Haney was opened on 13 June 1987. The journalist Jerry Langton wrote: "The Hells Angels soon emerged as the top dogs in the organized crime world in Vancouver". The Hells Angels formed "support crews" of young men wishing to join the Angels who committed the majority of the crimes attributed to the group.

== Law enforcement culpability ==
The journalists Julian Sher and William Marsden noted that in no province has the Crown consistently lost cases against the Hells Angels as much in British Columbia. Sher and Marsden wrote: "Plagued by rivalries, incompetence, and a general underestimation of the threat posed by the bikers, the police in B.C.-especially the RCMP-did little to take on the Hells Angels until their power made them virtually impregnable." The Coordinated Law Enforcement Unit that was supposed to pursue the Hells Angels by uniting detectives from the RCMP and various local police forces was described as a total failure. One Mountie stated that CLEU "became a dumping ground for the various police departments...of injured people, alcoholics, people in the twilight of their careers being put out to pasture". Officers at the RCMP national headquarters in Ottawa were critical of the RCMP's B.C. division with one Mountie saying: "They were afraid of their own tails". In 1996 and again in 1998, two Hells Angels in the Lower Mainland offered to become paid informers for the RCMP, but in both cases the RCMP declined to take up their offer, saying they were unwilling to pay for information about the Hells Angels.

== Killing of David Swartz ==
On 6 April 1988, David Ernest "Screwy" Swartz, a "full patch" member of the Hells Angels' East End Vancouver chapter, was shot and killed with a rifle by his friend Lynn Neil Eddington, who then killed himself with the same gun. The men had been drinking heavily at a party in a house at 15771 96th Avenue in Surrey when they began fighting. Eddington then left and returned with the rifle before he committed the murder-suicide. According the Lynn Neil's mother Jeanne Eddington, her son had been despondent after separating from his wife Cindy "and he was looking for a party" on the night of his death. In an interview with Carol Volkart of the Vancouver Sun, Jeanne stated her belief that her son had killed himself after shooting Swartz because he feared the Hells Angels would avenge his death and he did not want his family to become targets of retaliation. She said: "It was an argument between two young men who had been drinking. It was not a Hells Angel killing; it was not a gang-related killing". Shortly before the beginning of Eddington's funeral on 10 April 1988, three Hells Angels entered the Valley View Funeral Home chapel and began spitting on his coffin. Members of Eddington's family were warned: "We haven't finished with you yet". The following day, a message was left on the answering machine of Jeanne Eddington threatening: "That bastard Neil killed one of us and you guys are next". Jeanne Eddington reported the threat to the Surrey RCMP but did not request police protection. The East End chapter has since organised the annual "Screwy ride" in Swartz's memory. His son also became a member of the club.

== The gang war with the vor v zakone ==
John "Ray" Ginnetti was a financial adviser who worked for Canarim Investments of Vancouver while maintaining ties with the Hells Angels. In 1986, Ginnetti was arrested for running a boiler room operation, but was able to make bail. On 9 May 1990, Ginnettii was murdered inside his home in West Vancouver. His funeral was attended by a number of Hells Angels. A gangster with the vor v zakone ("Thieves in law", i.e. Russian organised crime), Sergey Filonov, was heard to boast that he had killed Ginnetti as a way to strike at the Angels, whom he had stolen $250,000 worth of cocaine from. On 15 May 1990, Filonov along with his brother Taras were attacked outside of a Vancouver bar. Sergey was shot dead while Taras was badly beaten with a hammer. Eugenivy Alkseev, another vor ("thief", the Russian term for gangsters), was wounded by a bomb planted in his car. On 1 August 1992, the body of Taras Filonov was found on the grounds of the University of British Columbia. He had been handcuffed and killed by a shotgun blast to the face. Roger Daggitt, the former Hells Angel who served as Ginnetti's bodyguard, was shot dead at a strip club on 6 October 1992. Aleksandr Alekseev, the brother to Eugenivy, disappeared in 1994 and is believed to have been murdered. Eugenivy was killed in 1995.

== The Mickle murder ==
On 30 April 1993, Michael "Zeke" Mickle, the president of the Hells Angels Nanaimo chapter, vanished and has never been seen again. Mickle is believed by the police to have been murdered by his fellow Angels for stealing cocaine from the club. Mickle became the first Hells Angel in British Columbia to be murdered.

== Mainstream status ==
The Hells Angels of British Columbia are the third largest contingent of the Canadian Angels after the chapters in Quebec and Ontario. The journalists Julian Sher and William Marsden wrote that Hells Angels of British Columbia "are Number One when it comes to wealth and statue" as the Angel chapters in British Columbia are the richest in Canada while the Angels have entered the mainstream economy, most notably the Vancouver Stock Exchange on Howe Street. The Hells Angels national president Walter Stadnick made a few visits to British Columbia, but the Angel chapters on the West Coast grew without much involvement from the Quebec chapters, which was unusual as the Quebec chapters tended to dominate the other chapters in Canada. By the year 2000, the Angels had 7 chapters in the Lower Mainland and Vancouver island with about 70 members. The Hells Angels took control of the port of Vancouver, which allowed them to dominate the drug trade in British Columbia.

Pat Convey, an officer of the Royal Canadian Mounted Police (RCMP) based in Victoria told Sher and Marsden: "They're baby boomers, they've come up in the criminal game. These guys have learned as they've gone on. They've become wealthier because they've become smarter and became smarter because they've got enough money to seek appropriate advisers". The majority of the British Columbia Hells Angels live upper-middle lifestyles and associate with lawyers, accountants and businessmen who launder their drug profits. When a Hells Angel, Mervyn "Mad Dog" Mayes was killed in a motorcycle accident, Gordon Hogg, a provincial cabinet minister attended his funeral, saying that Mayes was a close friend of his. Sasha Angus, the anti-fraud officer of the B.C. Securities Commission in charge of regulating the Vancouver Stock Exchange complained that many wealthy businessmen are quite willing to do business with the Angels and that "We understand the biker gangs are behind a lot of stuff [fraud] we've seen. But they don't always leave their calling card". The richest of all the Hells Angels chapters in British Columbia is the East End Vancouver chapter.

The journalist Jerry Langton wrote that British Columbia, especially the Lower Mainland, was one of the richest drug markets in North America because of a disconnect between state vs. society. Langton wrote that Canadians are far from the law-abiding people that they liked to pretend to be and are quite willing to break the law when it is in their own interests, using as an example the occasion in 1994 when the government of Jean Chretien increased cigarette taxes. Rather pay the increased cigarette taxes, ordinary Canadians much preferred to buy smuggled black market American cigarettes, which became a $1 billion industry almost overnight with 70% of the cigarettes smoked in Quebec in 1994 being smuggled cigarettes. Canadians only stopped buying smuggled cigarettes' when the federal government lowed the taxes on cigarettes. Langton wrote that British Columbia has since the 1960s tended to attract hedonist people who routinely used illegal drugs for recreational purposes despite what the law said, and this created a situation where organized crime groups could make millions as the values of society in British Columbia differed from those of the Canadian state. Langton wrote that the Hells Angels came to dominate organized crime in British Columbia because of their complicated structure with the hierarchy of associates, "hang-arounds", "prospects" and "full patch" members and the lure of membership, which allowed the Angels to have others commit crimes on their behalf. Finally, the Hells Angels had national and international connections that other organized crime groups lacked. The Hells Angels chapters in Quebec, most notably the Sherbrooke chapter, exported French-Canadian strippers to work for strippers agencies run by the Hells Angels in the Lower Mainland. Despite their avowed white supremacist ideology and use of Nazi symbols, the Hells Angels in British Columbia were because of their control of the port of Vancouver able to make deals with the Triads to import heroin from the "Golden Triangle" in southeast Asia into British Columbia.

The long-time president of the East End chapter was John Bryce, described by a high school classmate: "He's a very easy-going guy. When he explodes, he explodes. But he was always cool". Bryce had no criminal record, owned a motorcycle store in Burnaby named Hi-Way Choppers, and owned 1 house in Burnaby, 1 house in Maple Ridge and 4 houses in North Vancouver. His primary residence was a mansion located on a hill in Burnaby that gave him a view of the entire Fraser river valley and the Pacific Ocean. Bryce's lifestyle was typical of the members of the East End chapter who all owned houses in wealthy neighborhoods in North Vancouver, West Vancouver and Maple Ridge. Bryce's half-brother, Lloyd "Louie" Robinson (the two men have the same mother) was the sergeant-at-arms of the East End chapter. Robinson was one of the Hells Angels with the strongest ties to the Mafia. Robinson often met with the boxer-gangster Eddie Melo who served as the Toronto agent of Frank Cotroni and the three Commisso brothers of the Commisso 'ndrina. In 1989, Robinson was arrested on charges of second degree murder after Hilmar Suessmaier, the owner of the Metro nightclub, tried to expel an unruly Hells Angel, which led to him being beaten to death. The Crown later dropped the charges against Robinson, saying there was no prospect of a conviction if the case went to trial. Robinson was the owner of That's Entertainment stripper agency while Elie Bruneau, the president of the Haney chapter owned the Deluxe Entertainment stripper agency. In May 1995, That's Entertainment become the world's first company to feature on-line strippers on the internet. To charge for the website, That's Entertainment was a pioneer in on-line commence, being one of the world's first companies to allow for on-line credit transactions via the Bank of Montreal. In 1997, another of Robinson's internet companies, Starnet Communications, set an on-line sports betting website allegedly based in Antigua, but in fact run from Vancouver.

The Hells Angels in the Lower Mainland are extensively involved in pornography and real estate. One member of the East End chapter, Rob Alvarez, ran the on-line pornography firm, Rhythm Productions. Robin Lee, the wife of the East End member, Daminao Dipopolo, ran an website that featured nude photos of herself and other "Canadian Hotties'. The Hells Angels have invested heavily in Lower Mainland real estate, owning numerous apartment buildings, restaurants, supermarkets and houses as well as construction and garbage firms. Two Lower Mainland cell phone companies, Planet Cellular and Tele Tel Communications, were both owned by East End chapter members. Kim Harmer of the Mission chapter, owned 81 Transport, which supplied vehicles to Hollywood production companies shooting films and TV shows in the Lower Mainland. Ernie Ozolins of the Haney chapter was involved in a major stock fraud on Howe Street (the financial district of Vancouver) in 1997 by selling shares worth millions in a bogus gold mining company. Ozolins was murdered on 2 June 1997, a crime that remains unsolved.

In 1998, a Nomad chapter with no fixed territory was founded. Unlike the similar Nomad chapter based in Montreal, the Nomad chapter based in the Lower Mainland did not try to dominate the other chapters. The Nomad chapter held its meetings at the North Burnaby Inn owned by the Hells Angel Robert Green. Typical of the members of the Nomad chapter was Jamie Holland, a man with no known job or source of income who owned a condo worth $600, 000 in Vancouver.

== Project Nova ==
Robert Molseberry was a doormen at the Marble Arch bar associated with the Hells Angels who sold cocaine on the side. Molsberry was told that the Marble Arch was "East End territory" and that he would have to buy his cocaine from two Hells Angels, Francisco "Chico" Pires and Ronaldo Lising. Molsberry complained that he had to buy cocaine from Lising and Pires at $1, 500/per ounce which was $400 more than the market price. After his cocaine was stolen, Molsberry was threatened by Lising and Pires, which led him on 6 July 1996 to contact Detective Andy Richards of the Vancouver police service with an offer to turn Crown's evidence. Richards along with Detective Al Dalstorm launched Project Nova where they paid Molsberrry $2000 per month for information. Over the course of the next year, Dalstorm and Richards collected much information about the drug dealing of Pires and Lising. On 23 July 1998, Lising and Pires were arrested. In 2000, the Project Nova case went to trial and in January 2001 Lising and Pires were convicted. Though only a minor case that would be backpage news in any other province, the Project Nova case made headlines in British Columbia as the first time any Hells Angels had ever been convicted of drug dealing in British Columbia.

== Project Engima ==
Mike Ryan, an RCMP officer became convinced that the sports betting website operated by Starnet was a scam as he noticed that the website operated very efficiently while the phone system on Antigua barely functioned. Starting in late 1997, Ryan investigated Robinson's Starnet Computer Communications company as he believed that the sports gambling website was not based in Antigua, but rather in Vancouver. On 20 August 1999, the RCMP executed Project Enigma and raided the offices of Starnet where the police seized 154 boxes of documents, 74 computers and 100 gigabytes of data. The bank account of Starnet at the Canadian Imperial Bank of Commerce was frozen and the Crown seized $6, 697, 000 in the account. The RCMP found that the former owner of Starnet, Mark Dohlen, a close friend of Robinson's, was the de facto CEO of Starnet and that Dohlen was in close contact with Robinson, whom he provided copies of corporate minutes. Ryan noticed the initial investors who had provided $2.2 million in start-up capital to Starnet in 1995 are a mystery as no Starnet documents lists their identities. The precise identities of the initial investors remain unknown to this day.

On 17 August 2001, Starnet pleaded guilty to one count of illegally keeping a computer device for gambling in Canada. As part of the plea bargain with the Crown, Starnet paid a $100, 000 fine and forfeited the $2.2 million seized in 1999 as the proceeds of crime in exchange for the Crown dropping the other charges against the company. Robinson remained a very wealthy man who owned a house in West Vancouver valued at $1, 330, 000 and has been active on Howe Street, being a major shareholder in Robinson Investments, Genesis Resources, JLK Holdings and a number of gold mining companies listed on the Vancouver Stock Exchange (VSE). The Vancouver Stock Exchange had the dubious reputation of being the "scam capital of the world" as there were more cases of fraud and dishonesty involving companies listed on the VSE than any other stock exchange in the world. The Vancouver Stock Exchange, which specialized in the stocks of mining companies, tended to attract colorful characters mixed up in questionable schemes with the RCMP estimating in 1973 that between 20% and 30% of the companies listed on the VSE were involved in some sort of fraud.

== The Stirling case ==
Philip John Stirling was a fisherman based in Metchosin, a suburb of Victoria and an expert sailor. In 1989, he was convicted of smuggling cocaine via his fishing boat. In 1999, he started to smuggle cocaine into Canada from Columbia for the Hells Angels. At the same time, he approached the RCMP to become an informer on the cocaine smuggling scheme in exchange for $1 million and witness protection. The Victoria office of the RCMP made a sort of deal with Stirling, but Richard Barszczewki, the inspector of the RCMP's Drug Enforcement Branch, vetoed the deal with Stirling for reasons that remain unexplained. Convoy said of the veto: "It was going to be a good international bust. Then the wheels fell off. And they just kept falling". In late November 2000, Stirling went fishing on his boat, the Western Wind. Stirling claimed that he received a threatening email saying he had to go to Columbia to pick up cocaine, but no record of such an email has been found.

In February 2001, the Western Wind was returning to Victoria with the boat carrying more cocaine than fish. At the request of the RCMP, the Western Wind was boarded by U.S. Customs in American waters off Cape Alava where 101 bales of Columbian cocaine were found abroad. In the stormy waters of the Strait of Jan de Fuca, Convoy boarded the Western Wind and told Stirling that he could turn Crown's evidence or be imprisoned again for cocaine smuggling. Stirling was about to turn Crown's evidence when Convoy received a phone call from Barszczewski saying no deal would be offered to Stirling. One Mountie said: "It would have been a success if not for Richard Barszczewski". The Western Wind was taken to Seattle where 5, 500 pounds of cocaine were removed, but Stirling was not charged as he had taking the Western Wind to Victoria. It was believed by the Mounties that Stirling was working for the Hells Angels and remains a source of much anger on the part of Mounties such as Convoy that there was no attempt to have Stirling turn Crown's evidence. Rodne Tureaud of the U.S. Customs said of the Stirling case: "It was a travesty".

== The Roming case ==
Donny Roming was a member of the Hells Angels Nomad chapter who was a known drug dealer. On 9 March 2001, Roming was at the Bar None nightclub on Hamilton street where he was involved in a brawl with a rival drug dealer, John "Slick J" Rogers that turned into a shoot-out. Roming was shot dead, taking a bullet in his chest. Ricky Alexander was a Hells Angel with close ties to Bryce who had a vicious reputation. One Mountie said of him: "He's a scary fuck. Really scary". Alexander was seen to be waiting outside of Rogers's brother's house, apparently in the hope of seeing Rogers. The RCMP searched Alexander's car and found two loaded handguns along with a "hit list" on the members of the Rogers gang that contained an immense amount of information on the members of the Rogers gang. On 29 April 2001, Rogers was murdered at a gas station, taking two bullets to his brain.

== The Loft Six shoot-out ==
The Loft Six nightclub in Gastown was popular with members of the Independent Soldiers gang. On the night of 6 August 2003, a shoot-out on the floor of the nightclub between the Hells Angels and the Independent Soldiers left a Hells Angel associate, John Johnson, an Independent Soldier, Mahmoud Alkhalil, and an innocent by-stander, John Popovich, dead. The Loft Six shootout was the beginning of a takeover of the Independent Soldiers by the Hells Angels and by 2004 the Independent Soldiers were just a Hells Angels puppet gang.

== Prince George puppet gangs ==
The city of Prince George in the north of British Columbia was named twice by Maclean's magazine as "Canada's most dangerous city" because of its high murder rate.. Langton wrote: "With prosperous markets for drugs and other vices, Prince George is a vital part of Canada's underground economy. And as such, it could not be ignored by the Hells Angels". Inspector Gary Shinkaruk of the RCMP stated: "The north has been an expanding field. There are lot of drugs consumed in the north. They [the Hells Angels] want to tap into that lucrative market". The Hells Angels founded a puppet gang in Prince George known as the Renegades who in turn founded another puppet gang known as the Crew. In an infamous incident, a drug dealer in Prince George, Patrick Patriquin, staggered into a convenience store bleedingly badly as the clerk noticed he was missing his left hand. It is believed that the Crew chopped off Patriquin's hand. Shawn Giesbrecht, a drug addict and a drug dealer, went to see Scott Payne, the president of the Crew, on 14 November 2004, to tell him that was $170 short on his payments for the drugs he sold. Payne seized Giesbrecht's hand and used a knife to cut the little finger on Giesbrecht's left hand as a warning to those who fell behind in their drug debts to the Hells Angels. After the police arrested several members of the Crew including Payne, the Hells Angels took what was left of the Crew to merge with criminals from Kelowna to found the new Prince George chapter of the Independent Soldiers. When faced with drug charges, the president of the Renegades, William "Billy" Moore chose to turn Crown's evidence. On 25 March 2005, Moore was shot dead in his house, which was then burned down.

== Project Halo ==
Project Halo, a three-year investigation by the Combined Forces Special Enforcement Team of the RCMP, into alleged criminal activity with the Nanaimo chapter. The investigation culminated in the search warrant being executed on 12 December 2003. On 9 November 2007 a seizure order was executed, under section 467.12(1) of the Criminal Code, on the clubhouse by dozens of heavily armed RCMP officers.[80]

== The Hehn case ==
On 24 July 2003, Greg Hehn, a member of the Nomad chapter was arrested after being found with 51 kilograms of cocaine. Hehn along with a Hells Angel associate, Ewand Lilford, had been moving boxes out of a storage unit in Surry with cocaine worth $1.5 million inside. At Hehn's trial in March 2007 turned into a farce when Justice Peter Leask told the Crown Attorney, Ernie Froess, that he was wrong as he asserted that the cocaine found in the storage unit did not belong to Lilford because it would be dangerous to store cocaine in a locker belonging to a Hells Angel. Leask told the courtroom: "On the one hand, he can minimize his risk of detection and apprehension by just aborting the whole fucking thing, right?" Leask's frequent swearing in the courtroom was considered to be scandalous, all the more so because a group of schoolchildren were present in the courtroom that day. The case ended with Leask acquitting Hehn under the grounds no Hells Angel would store cocaine in a storage unit he had rented and Lilford was too intimidated by the Hells Angels to store cocaine in Hehn's locker.

== Operation E-Pandora ==
The most successful police operation against the Hells Angels in B.C. was Operation E-Pandora launched in 2003 when a Hells Angel, associate, Michael Plante, agreed to turn informer. In July 2003, Plante offered to give police information and became the police agent around whom much of the E-Pandora investigation ensued. Charges arose from project E-Pandora, an extensive police investigation, into the criminal activities of the East End charter of the Hells Angels. The evidence in this case included intercepted private communications including telephone and audio recordings, physical surveillance, and expert evidence. The case would eventually be dubbed the trial of R. v. Giles, and would see three charged individuals appear before the Supreme Court of British Columbia (SCBC). 72 appearances would span from 14 May 2007 until 20 February 2008 and, by order of Madam Justice Anne MacKenzie, include a publication ban on related trials.

== The Stanton case ==
Juel Stanton was a "full patch" member of the East End chapter with an arrest record going back to 1988. Stanton was considered to be one of the most violent members of the East End chapter who was expelled in May 2010 for being too violent even for the Hells Angels. Detective Andy Richards said of Stanton: "He was certainly very, very volatile and very high-maintenance from a club perspective. He drew a lot of unwanted police attention and a lot of unwanted public attention to the Hells Angels". Stanton was found murdered inside of his apartment on 12 August 2010.

== The death of Ashley Machiskinic ==
On 15 September 2010, Ashley Machinskinc, a First Nations woman and a drug addict, who lived on the Downtown Eastside of Vancouver, fell to her death. Her case became a cause célèbre in Vancouver with a number of First Nations activists charging that Mackinskinic had been murdered by the Hells Angels. At a "townhall meeting" on 6 October 2010, Angela Marie MacDougall of the Battered Women's Support Services stated that the Hells Angels were responsible and that: "The rape and beatings are standard punishment. What is a little bit unusual are women's heads being shaved...and women coming out windows". Gladys Radek of the Walk 4 Justice group told the meeting: "There's been a few women lately thrown out of windows. Women missing fingers, wearing wigs because their heads have been shaved". Langton wrote the Hells Angels routinely cut off fingers and even hands as punishment for not paying drug debts and that for the Hells Angels the life of a woman like Machinskinic would have meant nothing.

== The Philips case ==
Dean Philips was a former hockey player living in Kelowna whose sons were being bullied by the Hells Angels. On 11 June 2011, he went to confront them and was beaten to death. Two "full patch" Hells Angels, Robert Thomas and Norman Crooks were charged with first degree murder for Philip's death. Both were denied bail and both were beaten up in jail. Langton wrote that the status of the Hells Angels in B.C. have declined so much by 2011 it was considered possible for other prisoners to beat them up without fear of being killed.

== The Port of Vancouver ==
The Port of Vancouver is controlled by the Hells Angels, who use the port as a conduit for drug smuggling. The port is used to smuggle cocaine, methamphetamine, and heroin into Canada while also being used to smuggle cocaine and methamphetamine into Australia, New Zealand, and Southeast Asia.

Mike Toddington, a British immigrant who served in Canadian Ports Police from 1969 onward wrote along with Constable Gary Fotia a report in August 1994 that the port of Vancouver was the center of "a massive billion-dollar-plus drug import industry". Toddington and Fotia concluded: "The Hells Angels have extensively infiltrated the operations of the port. Angels are among the first to board arriving ships. They unload the goods, place them for storage, load them onto trucks and prepare the necessary documents". Toddington and Fotia wrote that local 502 of the International Longshore and Warehouse Union (ILWU) was "littered with members and associates of the Angels. They are placed in key positions that enable them to commit crimes". The East End Vancouver chapter had 16 members in 1994 who were ILWU members working the waterfront including John Bryce, the chapter president. Fotia told Sher and Marsden: "They're in key positions to have anything moved to where they it to be moved." Toddington said of the Angels working in the port of Vancouver: "you could have people putting the containers anywhere they want". The Canada Ports Police officers on the West Coast numbered in 29 in total in 1994, down from the 42 employed in 1986. Toddington stated that as an honest policeman, he faced constant intimidation, harassment and threats from the Angels on the waterfront. Bob Wilds, the president of the B.C. Maritime Employers Association, which employed the longshoremen in British Columbia, admitted in a speech in 1995 that the Angels were "in a position of influence" on the waterfront. In 1995, a report by the Criminal Intelligence Section of B.C stated: "Hells Angels have numerous members in the longshoremen’s union, employed in a variety of port jobs. This has provided them with the direct means of transporting narcotics and other drugs internationally...Hells Angels employees have access to a variety of ports in various locations, access to vessels, containers, scheduling and their own trucking companies to load and unload product. The Hells Angels East End chapter’s relationship with traditional organized crime [an euphemism for the Mafia] not only serves in expanding the parameters for economic opportunities through illegal means but unites these two organizations in a partnership of strength."

In 1994, Toddington grew concerned when a woman who was the first cousin of a Hells Angel who started to work as a receptionist for Ron Longstaffe, the president of the Vancouver Ports Corporation. Toddington opened an investigation of her. The woman was observed going to a Burnaby crack-house operated by the Hells Angels and traces of cocaine were found inside of her car. On 17 January 1997, Toddington saw Norman Stark, a former Canada Ports Police chief, to tell him: "We know she has relatives who are organised crime. You've got a problem. She is a serious risk". On 4 March 1997, Toddington was phoned by Sidney Peckford, the director of the Ports Police, who told him to cease his investigation, which had angered many powerful people in both Vancouver and Ottawa. Toddington told Fotia to continue the investigation, saying "This investigation is continuing, as far as we're concerned". On 19 March 1997, Toddington was fired. Toddington sued the Crown for wrongful dismissal and won his case with a judge ruling that Toddington was fired for political reasons. In 1997, the government of Jean Chretien disbanded the Canada Ports Police and replaced the Ports Police with poorly paid private security guards, which marked the end of any attempt to stop the Hells Angels from smuggling drugs into British Columbia. Besides for being paid low wages, which made them open to corruption, the security guards had no weapons, no power to open investigations, and no powers of arrest with the guards being required to phone the police if they saw anything suspicious at the ports. In July 1997, the federal government fired all Canada Ports Police officers to save $11 million per year and destroyed all of their intelligence files, decisions that have drawn much ire from all of the police chiefs of the port cities, who called the decision to disband the Ports Police extremely myopic. Damiano Dipolpolo, a "full patch" member of the East End chapter visited the waterfront of the port of Vancouver in early 2002 despite not being a longshoreman and was confronted by a security guard over his unauthorized presence. The next day, the security guard was confronted by a Hells Angels "support crew" who told him: "The next time Mr. Dipolpolo comes, don't you dare think about dropping the boom gate down. He comes down here and does what he wants, when he wants-got it!" The incident was typical of the threats faced by the security guards, and only attracted attention because the guard reported the incident to the police.

By 2003, there were 43 Hells Angels and Angel associates working at the port of Vancouver. Peter Bell, an Australian immigrant who served as the senior strategic intelligence analyst for the B.C. Organized Crime Agency stated that the Hells Angels control not only the longshoremen union, but also the trucking, maintenance, laundry and garbage services at the Port of Vancouver. Bell had served with the Queensland Police Service, and stated that most of the drugs sold by the Brisbane chapter of the Hells Angels came from Vancouver, which inspired him to move to Canada to track the source of the drugs. Bell used the case in January 2001 where the Hells Angels associates were caught smuggling 9 kilograms of cocaine via garbage bags at the port of Prince Rupert of just how important the garbagemen are for smuggling drugs out of a port. In an interview with Sher and Marsden in 2003, Bell stated that at least 8 foremen at the Port of Vancouver were Hells Angels, which allowed them to decide where workers worked and when. Bell said of the way that Hells Angel senior foremen tended to suddenly switch from port to port, going for an example in the summer of 2002 a group of Hells Angels foremen suddenly went from Vancouver port to the ports at Delta and Surrey despite the reduction in wages that it entailed that: "It stinks. It sends alarm bells off to us; we knew something was going on". He told Sher and Marsden that "we see a gathering of players when a certain vessel arrives", saying that a number of Hells Angel foremen will suddenly all be transferred to the same terminal when a certain ship from Asia or Latin America arrives. Bell has expressed concern about Al Debruyn, the president of the Angels White Rock chapter and a foreman at the port of Vancouver, who has often been seen socializing in public with the executives with the ports corporation and the shipping companies. Bell told Sher and Marsden that security at the Port of Vancouver was absurd as the Royal Canadian Mounted Police subjected only 121 of the 27,000 people who worked at the port for security background vetting. Jock Wadley of the Vancouver police service said of his unit's crime-fighting: "Two boats to patrol two hundred kilometers of shoreline. There is a whole lot of shoreline that's left unguarded".

In September 2010, a memo by Border Services Agency stated about the port of Vancouver: "The presence of numerous members of organized crime groups (OCGs) as dockside employees of the Port of Vancouver, coupled with the ability to access the port by members of OCGs employed in the trucking industry creates a high-risk for smuggling at the port...Vancouver marine will continue to pose a high risk for the smuggling of precursor chemicals [for manufacturing methamphetamine] into Canada from China and India. However, Prince Rupert may increasingly become the port of entry for precursor chemical shipments due to expansion in marine container commerce and/or a deliberate effort by smugglers to direct shipments through Prince Rupert, in the hope of evading seizure of the shipments." In 2012, a report by Transport Canada stated that the a number of Mexican cartels such as the Sinaloa Cartel, Los Zetas, the Knights Templar Cartel and the South Pacific Cartel are smuggling cocaine into Canada via the port of Vancouver.

Superintendent Mike Porteous of the Vancouver police stated in 2014: "Vancouver is an international hub for distribution to Southeast Asia and other countries across the water, where as you know the prices are significantly higher". Andy Smith, the president of the British Columbia Maritime Employers' Association, stated in May 2015 about the employment of Hells Angels at the port: "Yes, we are aware of who they are. They make no secret of it". A number of Hells Angels such as Larry Amero, Vince Brienza, Norm Krogstad, John Bryce, and Gino Zumpano work at the Port of Vancouver. At the port of Vancouver, the hiring of workers is controlled by local 502 of the ILWU with the B.C. Maritime Employers' Association being responsible only for the training and paying the wages of the longshoremen. To be hired as a longshoremen requires that an applicant being sponsored by a current member of the local 502, which has allowed Hells Angels working as longshoremen to sponsor other Hells Angels. On 24 May 2012, two Hells Angels, Rob Alvarez of the Nomad chapter, and Damiano Dipopolo of the Kelowna chapter, started to work at the port after being sponsored by other Hells Angels. In 2014, the Hells Angel Ryan Sept started to work as a longshoreman after being sponsored by another Hells Angels longshoreman. In 2015, Kim Bolan, the crime correspondent of The Vancouver Sun newspaper, identified 27 longshoremen at the port of Vancouver who were members of the Hells Angels or had Hells Angels associations.. Len Isnor, the chief of the Ontario Provincial Police's Anti-Biker Unit, told Bolan: "It is a concern to us. We feel that a lot of the illegal drugs that come into this country come in through our ports." Isnor stated that the control of the port of Vancouver has allowed the Angels to import drugs on a massive scale, which has been a major reason for the success of the Hells Angels in Canada. The container ships allowed drugs to be smuggled into or out of Canada on a larger scale than is possible with air traffic. Since the terrorist attacks of 11 September 2001, security has been increased at Canada's airports, which has made smuggling via the air more difficult, and led to an increased emphasis on smuggling via the sea as security has not increased at the sea ports. Several people on the executive board of local 502 of the ILWU have criminal records or ties to organized crime.

A report by Transport Canada in April 2017 stated that Port of Vancouver is corrupt as the reported concluded: "To facilitate their smuggling activities, OCGs [organized crime groups] are involved in the corruption of port workers, and have embedded members and associates within port facilities by way of legitimate employment... That it is certain that organized crime groups and transnational criminal organizations will continue to exploit vulnerabilities at B.C.’s marine ports to facilitate smuggling both into and out of Canada (emphasis in the original)". Australian officials have complained that most of the cocaine and methamphetamine in Australia comes from the port of Vancouver. Commander Clint Sims of the Australian Border Force told Bolan that gangsters': "...tend to use some of the more trusted countries, if you like, that have good reputations around the world and also have a high volume of legitimate cargo coming out to transship illicit goods. We see cartels, particularly from Mexico, moving drugs to countries like Canada for that reason". Assistant Commissioner Mike Pannett of the Australian Federal Police told Bolan that: "Vancouver port is a significant location for us as far as importation of drugs and transshipment of drugs. We see transshipments through a whole lot of ports. Vancouver is one of the bigger ones obviously". Michael Outram, the commissioner of the Australian Border Force stated: "Our per capita drug-consumption rate is amongst the highest in the world. And we also pay very high prices in Australia compared to a lot of other countries. So that makes, unfortunately, the illicit drug market in Australia very lucrative for organized crime and transnational organized crime. We’ve seen some high numbers of detections and seizures at the border". In Australia, a kilogram of methamphetamine sells for $200,000 Australian dollars ($180, 000 Canadian dollars) while in Canada a kilogram of methamphetamine sells between $3, 500-$4, 000 Canadian dollars.. The Canadian Hells Angels have identified as key figures in smuggling drugs into Australia via the port of Vancouver along with the Australian Comanchero gang who distribute the drugs once they arrived in Australia. Superintendent Jared Taggart of the Australian Federal Police stated that despite the violent clashes between the Australian Hells Angels and the Comancheros, that: "It’s that ever-evolving business model of transnational serious and organized crime and their willingness to co-operate together, even when they say that they’re enemies and that they don’t co-operate. That’s all really smoke and mirrors. It’s all about power, control and harm on our communities."

In January 2024, Mike Farnworth, the Solicitor-General of British Columbia, went to Ottawa to ask for the federal government of Justin Trudeau to reestablish the Canada Ports Police. Farnworth told Bolan that the "ports are a porous sieve for a lot of criminal activity that is taking place in this country, and we need to be doing a far better job of getting a handle on it than we have been to date". Farnworth argued that given the way that the Hells Angels control the port of Vancouver to smuggle drugs both into Canada and out to fellow Commonwealth nations such as Australia and New Zealand were a major concern that should be best addressed by restoring the Canada Ports Police. On 23 August 2024, the city of Delta passed a resolution asking for the federal government to restore the Ports Police as it stated that drug smuggling at the ports was rampant. George Harvie, the mayor of Delta, told the journalists Srushti Gangdev and Charles Brockman: "It’s no surprise we’re having such vast quantities coming in, because it’s very low risk for the cartels and the gangs that are shipping these products into our country; there’s very little risk for them to be actually caught". Peter German, a crime expert and a former RCMP deputy commissioner noted for the entire year of 2020 106 kilograms of methamphetamines worth $13.5 million were seized by the border agents at the Deltaport and that in 2023 one shipment of 6,330 kilograms of methamphetamine worth $1.5 billion Canadian dollars were seized on a container ship that was destined for Australia at the Deltaport. German noted that the drug seizures represented only a small fraction of the drugs that were either shipped out or shipped in. German told Ganddev and Brockman: "Of great concern is the reality that Canada, once a source country for marijuana, nicknamed ‘B.C. bud,’ is now producing deadly drugs for export".

== Drug trafficking ==
On 27 March 2008, the SCBC Justice MacKenzie ruled against prosecutors who had attempted to convict a Hells Angels member of possession for the benefit of a criminal organization. Although two associates of the Hells Angels, David Roger Revell and Richard Andrew Rempel were convicted of possession for the purpose of trafficking, Justice MacKenzie concluded that with the acquittal of the only Hells Angel member being tried, David Francis Giles, on a charge of possession of cocaine for the purpose of trafficking, a second charge against him (count two) of possessing it for the benefit of a criminal organization had to fail as well. In summary, Revell and Rempel were found guilty but Giles was found not guilty on either count. Also, Revell and Rempel were found not guilty on the charge of possession of cocaine for the purpose of trafficking.

In her acquittal of Giles, Justice MacKenzie said she found the evidence against him was "weak" and intercepted communications were "unreliable" because they were difficult to hear. She further stated that the Crown prosecutors had failed to demonstrate beyond a reasonable doubt the group was working to the "benefit of, at the direction of or in association with a criminal organization, to wit: the East End charter of the Hells Angels".

David Giles, a founding member and former vice president of the Hells Angels' Kelowna chapter, was sentenced to eighteen years in prison by the Supreme Court on 31 March 2017 after he was convicted of conspiracy to import cocaine, conspiracy to traffic, and possession for the purpose of trafficking. On 25 August 2012, he and seven others were arrested after brokering a drug deal with undercover RCMP officers posing as South American drug lords. He made a $4 million down payment on the delivery of what was purported to be 200 kilograms of cocaine to a Burnaby warehouse. Giles' sentence was the longest prison term ever handed down to a member of the Hells Angels in British Columbia. Giles, who was originally from eastern Canada and formed a close relationship with Maurice "Mom" Boucher, died in an Abbotsford hospital on 1 July 2017, aged 67.

== The murder of Robert Green ==
Robert Green, one of the most senior Hells Angels in British Columbia was murdered on 16 October 2016. A policeman told Bolan: "He has been in the thick of the underworld and crime and gangsterism his whole life. He is one of the most influential high-profile B.C. Hells Angels. He had his hand in a bunch of different territories, regions in the province. He had influence on the island, up north and into the Prairies." Green was killed by Jason Wallace of the 856 gang at a party in a Quonset Hut that served as the clubhouse for the 856 gang.

The 856 gang served as a puppet gang for the Hells Angels, and on 15-16 October 2016 the 856 gang engaged in a party at their Quonset Hut that lasted nearly 17 hours as they drank excessive amounts of alcohol, snorted cocaine and used nitrous oxide (laughing gas). There was an altercation between Shaun Clary of the 856 gang and Green, which was ended by Wallace shooting and killing Green. Wallace stated he was so drunk and high on drugs that that he did not know why he shot Green. Afterwards, Wallace received a phone call telling him to commit suicide or hand himself over to the Hells Angels to be killed, and failing the first two demands, his entire family would be killed. In a phone call to the police, Wallace confessed to killing Green, saying: "I’m pretty sure I fucking shot him. I don’t even know how...Yeah, and I don’t even understand how or why — or even why or nothing, I don’t know...I don’t even know. I was like my mind wasn’t even there. It was like I was so fucked up".

Wallace instead turned Crown's evidence and made a plea bargain where the charges of murder were dropped in exchange for him pleading guilty to manslaughter and for police protection for his family. Clary was kidnapped, tortured and murdered with what was left of his dismembered corpse being found by the roadside ten days after Green's murder. The police described Clary's murder as "barbaric" and noted that what was left of him had been dumped by a roadside, where it was meant to be found.

== Iranian Proxy ==
Damion Patrick Ryan and Adam Richard Pearson, Hells Angels members in Vancouver were hired by Iranian Drug Lord Naji Sharifi Zindashti to assassinate two dissidents on American soil. Naji Sharifi Zindashti remains at large and is wanted by the FBI.

== Books ==
- Edwards, Peter; Nájera, Luis (2021). The Wolfpack The Millennial Mobsters Who Brought Chaos and the Cartels to the Canadian Underworld. Toronto: Random House of Canada. ISBN 9780735275409.
- Langton, Jerry (2013). The Notorious Bacon Brothers Inside Gang Warfare on Vancouver Streets. Toronto: John Wiley and Sons. ISBN 9781118404577.
- Sher, Julian; Marsden, William (2003). The Road to Hell How Biker Gangs Are Conquering Canada. Toronto: Alfred Knopf.
