= Mick Hawi =

Lebanese-Australian outlaw biker and gangster (1980–2018)

- Born: Mahmoud Hawi; 9 May 1980; Beirut, Beirut Governorate, Lebanon
- Died: 14 February 2018 (aged 37); Sydney, New South Wales, Australia
- Occupations: Outlaw biker; crime boss
- Years active: 1999–2018
- Known for: National president of the Comanchero
- Predecessor: Jock Ross
- Successor: Duax Ngakuru
- Allegiance: Comanchero MC (1999–2018)
- Conviction: Drug possession (2005) Manslaughter (2014)

Mick Hawi (9 May 1980 – 14 February 2018) was a Lebanese-Australian outlaw biker and gangster who served as the second national president and "supreme commander" of the Comanchero Motorcycle Club.

== Early life ==
Hawi was born in Beirut, Lebanon In 1980, his family fled the Lebanese Civil War as refugees and settled in Sydney, New South Wales.

Hawi had what his judge at his 2011 trial called an "uneventful, if meagre" childhood. He attended Punchbowl Boys High School in the Punchbowl suburb of Sydney. In 1995, Hawi started to date an Australian woman, Caroline Gonzales. Hawi left high school at the age of 16 and worked in his father's spray painting business. In 2001, he married Gonzales. The couple were married in a private wedding, but were never legally married under Australian law. Hawi had two children by his wife.

== The Comancheros ==
At the age of 19, Hawi joined the Comanchero Motorcycle Club in 1999. Tall and muscular, Hawi stood out in the Comancheros.

In 2002, Hawi led a group of younger Comancheros to meet the Comanchero "supreme commander" "Jock" Ross at his house. The Australian policeman Duncan McNab in his 2013 book Outlaw Bikers in Australia wrote that: "Ross was unsuspecting and outnumbered and the discussion was quick and violent. The Comancheros, led by Mick Hawi, delivered a comprehensive beating to the much older leader. They left him battered and took both his club colours and his Harley-Davidson. It was the outlaw equivalent of spitting in Jock's face." In 2003, Hawi proclaimed himself to be the new Comanchero national president and "supreme commander". In 2005, Hawi was convicted of drug possession.

Following the 2005 Cronulla riots, in which Middle Eastern Australian youths clashed with Anglo-Celtic Australians, Hawi called for peace and met with the Bra Boys gang of Maroubra. In November 2007, he survived a shooting attempt when the car he was travelling in was fired upon by two men outside Grappa Ristorante in the Sydney suburb of Leichhardt. According to Hawi, a bullet lodged in the headrest of his car seat. Subsequently, he began occasionally travelling in a bulletproof car.

=== Sydney Airport brawl ===
In 2008, the Comancheros were involved in a gangland struggle against the Hells Angels. On 22 March 2009, Hawi along with several other Comancheros was involved in a brawl at Sydney Airport with the Hells Angels led by the Hells Angels Australian national president Derek Wainohu. Both Hawi and the Wainohu were on the same flight from Melbourne to Sydney, which led to a fierce fight at Sydney Airport. During the flight, Hawi and Wainohu exchanged words and afterwards texted their respective members of their gangs to be present at Sydney airport. At gate 5 of the airport, a brawl broke out as the Hells Angels and Comancheros fought each other. One witness, Naomi Constantine, told the Australian Broadcasting Corporation News: "They started grabbing the metal poles that break up the check-in area and swinging them almost like swords at each other's heads. I saw one of the men lying on the ground and another man came up with a pole and just started smashing it into his head."

The brawl ended with Anthony Zervas, a brother of the Hells Angel Peter Zervas, being punched and kicked to death in public by the Comancheros. Zervas was not a member of the Hells Angels, but as the younger brother of Peter Zervas, the sergeant-at-arms of the Angels Sydney chapter, was so closely associated with the Hells Angels that he was considered to be an unofficial member. The security camera footage showed the Comancheros displayed extreme sadism as they gleefully punched and kicked Zervas while smashing in his head with a 17-kilogram metal bollard. According to witnesses, Hawi left the scene telling Peter Zervas: "You're dead. You're fucking dead. Next time we see you, you're going to have bullet holes through you". After killing Anthony Zervas, the Comancheros boarded a taxi and shouted at the driver "go, go, go!" Hawi went into hiding after the airport incident and was for a time Australia's most wanted man. The security camera footage of Zervas's death was frequently played on Australian television and forever ended the popular image in Australia of outlaw bikers as loveable outcasts from a society that the bikers claimed to be oppressive.

==== Charges ====
Hawi was charged with second degree murder in connection with Zervas's killing. His trial began on 25 May 2011. The Crown Attorney prosecuting Hawi, Natalie Adams, stated that the feud with the Hells Angels led to the "perfect storm" at the Sydney airport as the hatred between the two gangs was such that members of both gangs were willing to kill each other. During the trial, the Crown introduced as evidence skin flakes whose DNA matched Hawi's that were found under Zervas's fingernails.

On 1 November 2011, Hawi was found guilty of second degree murder and affray (i.e fighting in public). Justice Robert Allan Hulme stated that he felt that the Crown had not established that Hawi had personally inflicted any blows on Zervas, but that: "His presence would undoubtedly have had the effect of authorising and approving the actions of the other man who bludgeoned Anthony Zervas to death." Hawi appealed the murder conviction and in a plea bargain with the Crown on 4 September 2014 pleaded guilty to manslaughter. Besides for his convictions in relation to the Sydney airport incident, Hawi had a number of minor driving convictions alongside convictions for his use of offensive language in public.

In 2015, Hawi was released on parole. One who knew him stated: "Mick was a big player in Sydney before being a bikie was fashionable and tensions with the [Hells] Angels and his own club have been high ever since he got out [of prison]. He was a man of his word, he had balls, demanded respect, and didn't give a fuck." In January 2023, a photograph was released which showed Hawi having dinner in a posh Istanbul restaurant with Duax Ngakuru and Hakan Ayik.

== Death ==
Hawi was in the parking lot of the Rockdale Fitness First gym on the south side of Sydney on 14 February 2018 when he was shot dead in his automobile. Assistant Commissioner Mal Lanyon of the New South Wales police stated: "I'd say it was a targeted and planned attack and completely without regard to human life". Immediately after his murder, Hawi's widow, Carolina Gonzales, went to see a Sydney property developer, Eddie Haragli, and threatened to kill him as she believed he was the man behind her husband's murder.

=== Charges ===
Yusuf Nazlioglu and Jamal Eljaidi were charged with first degree murder with the Crown alleging that Nazlioglu was the man who killed Hawi. The defense lawyers put forward the alternative theory that Haragli was the killer. On 9 September 2020, both Nazlioglu and Ejaidi were acquitted on the murder charges. Gonzales's feud with Ophelia Haragli, the wife of Eddie Haragli, has attracted much media attention in Australia. Nazlioglu himself was shot dead on 27 June 2022. Mohammed Hosni Khaled, 25, was arrested on 19 April 2022 and charged with Nazlioglus' murder. As of April 2025 Khaled was on trial for that shooting.

== Books ==
- McNab, Duncan (2013). Outlaw Bikers in Australia The Real Story. Sydney: Macmillan Australia. ISBN 978-1742612942.
- Veno, Arthur (2011). The Brotherhoods: Inside the Outlaw Biker Clubs. Sydney: Unwin & Allen. ISBN 9781459616110.
