= Arop Yor Ayik =

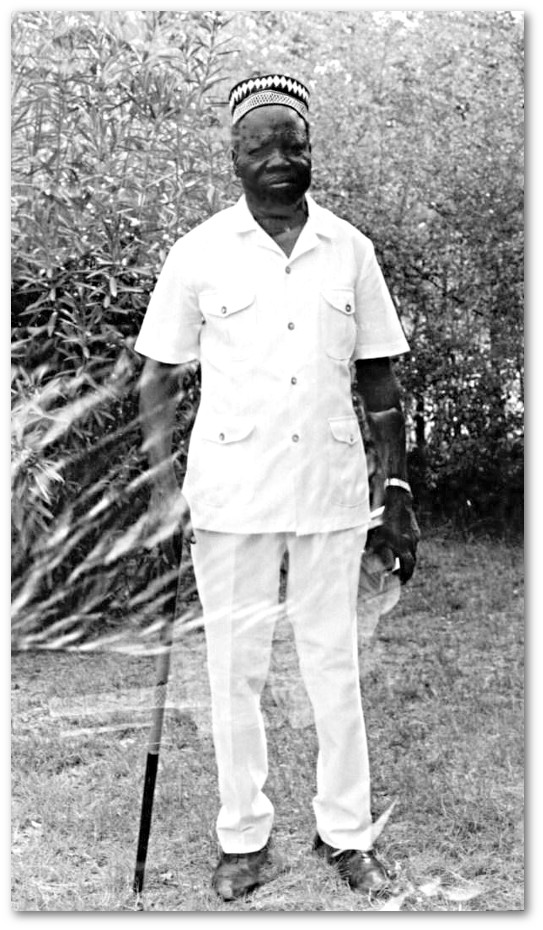
Standing image of Late Arop Yor Ayik

Arop Yor Ayik (1935 – June 1999) was a South Sudanese academic and politician.

== Early life ==
He was born in Palo, Doleib Hill, Upper Nile State, South Sudan. He attended primary school at the American Mission at Doleib Hill and was baptized in 1948. From 1949 to 1952, he attended Atar Intermediate School and from 1953 to 1958 attended Rumbek Government Secondary School in Southern Sudan. (Note: all Southern schools were closed down in 1955 due to the first civil war in Torit (South Sudan) in August 1955 which meant loss of one year for all students).

He subsequently attended the University of Khartoum in Sudan from 1958 to 1962, studying English, special Arabic, Economics, History, and Philosophy and graduating with B.A. in special Arabic and Philosophy.

In 1986, he was awarded M.A. in TAFL (teaching Arabic as a foreign language) from the American University in Cairo, Egypt.

== Career ==
As an educator, and according to the UNESCO Monograph 1951 and 1953, I advocate the bilingual system of education as the best option in any multilingual and multicultural societies for their unity, harmony and stability.

— Arop Yor Ayik, April 1996, Khartoum

=== Administrative and academic positions ===
- Tutor in Arabic Department, Faculty of Arts, University of Khartoum (1962-64)
- Assistant Warden of Students, University of Khartoum (1964-66) and (1969-80)
- Academic Registrar, University of Khartoum (1974)
- Dean of Students, University of Juba (1982-83)
- Center Coordinator, School of Extra-Mural Studies, University of Khartoum (1986 until death)

=== Political positions ===
- Minister of Works, Sudan Central Government (1966-67)
- M.P. and Deputy Speaker of National Parliament in Khartoum (1974-77)
- Minister of Education, Southern Council (1988-89)
- Chairman of National committee for the education of Southern Pupils and Students (1989-90)

=== Positions in Southern Sudan ===
- Director of Education (1970-72)
- Director of Information (1972-74)
- Commissioner for Census (1981-82)

=== Other assignments ===
- Chairman of the Shilluk Oversight Committee (1989 until death)
- Member of the Arabic Academy of the Sudan (1993 until death)
- Ruling elder in the Presbyterian Church in the Sudan (1990 until death)

== Personal life ==
Arop Yor Ayik was married. He had four daughters and two sons, all university graduates.

== Death ==
Arop Yor Ayik died in the Netherlands in 1999. He was buried in Sudan in June 1999.
