= Comanchero Motorcycle Club =

Australian outlaw motorcycle club

- Founded: 1968; 58 years ago
- Founder: William George "Jock" Ross
- Founded at: Sydney, Australia
- Type: Outlaw motorcycle club
- Region served: New South Wales, Victoria, Western Australia, Queensland, Canberra, South Australia, New Zealand, Tonga, Bosnia, Germany, Russia, Turkey, Spain, USA, Thailand
- Members: (2019) Approximately 350–400 in Australia; over 1,000 worldwide (estimated)
- Leader: Allan Meehan

The Comanchero Motorcycle Club is an Australian outlaw motorcycle club founded in Sydney in 1968 by William George "Jock" Ross. The club has developed into one of Australia's most influential and internationally connected outlaw motorcycle clubs, with chapters throughout Australia and in several countries across Europe, Asia and Oceania. For periods of its history, it has been described by Australian media and law-enforcement agencies as one of the country's most powerful and feared outlaw motorcycle clubs and a significant organised crime threat.

The Commanchero has established a substantial national and international presence and has been linked by Australian and international law-enforcement agencies to transnational drug trafficking, money laundering, firearms offences, extortion, organised violence, and other forms of organised criminal activity. Throughout its history, the club has been involved in several of Australia's most significant outlaw motorcycle club conflicts, including the Milperra massacre in 1984 which was a conflict between The Comanchero and The Bandidos Motorcycle Club, the Sydney Airport bikie brawl in 2009 which involved Members of the Comanchero and Hells Angels and violent conflicts with other rival motorcycle clubs. The organisation has also been a principal target of Australian law-enforcement operations, including the Australian Criminal Intelligence Commission's “Taskforce Morpheus”, a national initiative established to disrupt outlaw motorcycle clubs and transnational organised crime and the Comanchero Motorcycle Club have also been investigated by the Federal Bureau of Investigation who have assisted Australian and European authorities in investigations into the Comanchero.

== History ==
William George "Jock" Ross, a Scottish immigrant, formed the club originally in Glasgow, Scotland, then after emigrating to Sydney, New South Wales, in 1968. He chose the name after seeing the 1961 John Wayne film The Comancheros. (There was already a Californian motorcycle club of the same name, first mentioned in a 1965 article by Hunter S. Thompson, and in his book Hell's Angels a year later.) Ross hung a sign on the wall of the Comancheros' clubhouse that read: "If it's white, sniff it/If it's female or it moves, fuck it/If it narks-kill it"".

Ross-who gave himself the grandiose title of "Supreme Commander"-ran his club in extremely authoritarian and militaristic manner. The Comancheros were considered to be the most violent of Australia's many outlaw biker clubs in the 1970s-1980s owing to their frequent brawls. Ross required his men to engage in weekly para-military drills and he formed an elite force which he called the Strike Force of especially tough members. Many Comancheros disliked Ross as one former member told the media: "If I wanted to march around in the fuckin' backyard, I would had joined the fuckin' army".

In 1983 a second Comanchero chapter was formed by Anthony Mark "Snoddy" Spencer, who had broken away from the first chapter after challenging Ross' authority. When visiting the United States with Charles Paul "Charlie" Scibberas, another member of the second chapter, Spencer met with members of the Texan motorcycle club the Bandidos and the two gangs became allies. At the time, P2P, one of the chemicals that can be used for manufacture of methamphetamine, was legal in Australia, but not in the United States. The Bandidos wanted an alliance to have P2P smuggled into the United States to assist with manufacturing methamphetamine, the market for which they dominated in Texas. The Bandidos eventually patched-over the second Comanchero chapter to become the Bandidos' first Australian chapter in November 1983.

The Comancheros and Bandidos were now rivals, and in September 1984 the two clubs engaged in the Milperra massacre, a shoot-out that left seven people dead – four Comancheros, two Bandidos, and a 14-year-old bystander. Ross received a lifetime jail sentence for his involvement in the gunfight, but served only five years and three months before he was released. In 2002, Ross was deposed as the Comanchero "supreme commander" by the Lebanese immigrant Mahmoud "Mick" Hawi who now assumed that title.

The Comancheros and Hells Angels clashed at Terminal 3 of Sydney Airport on 22 March 2009 in a brawl involving 10 people in the two rival bikie gangs. The brawl left Anthony Zervas, the brother of a Hells Angel, dead. The fighting was witnessed by over 50 travellers, CCTV cameras and airport staff, including airport security, who could do little to intervene. The security staff were unarmed and Australian Federal Police arrived late. Six Comancheros were arrested as a result of the altercation and convicted of "riot and affray". In November 2011 Comancheros leader Mahmoud "Mick" Hawi was found guilty of affray and murder, but in May 2014 the murder conviction was overturned on appeal and a retrial ordered. Hawi pleaded guilty to manslaughter and in March 2015 he was sentenced to a minimum of 3.5 years jail. In February 2018 Hawi was shot dead, at age 37, whilst sitting in his car outside a gym in Rockdale, NSW.

In late 2009 Duax Ngakuru was elected as national president. Mark Buddle became the national president in 2011 when Ngakuru fled Australia. Mick Murray was appointed acting national president in 2016 when Buddle in turn fled Australia. The Comanchero was described as being ruled by a triumvirate that consisted of Melbourne chapter president Mick Murray, the national sergeant-at-arms Tarek Zahed and Sydney chapter president Allan Meehan. On 20 August 2017 a brawl broke out at a strip club in Canberra between the members of the Comanchero Victoria and New South Wales chapters. The brawl led to Buddle to attempt to reassert his authority by sending Ali Bazzi to run the club in his absence.

The Comanchero experienced a period of turmoil in 2022–2023. Mick Murray, the president of the Melbourne chapter was arrested for first degree murder on 28 April 2022. Tarek Zahed, the national sergeant-at-arms, was badly wounded during a murder attempt on 8 May 2022. Mark Buddle was extradited from Turkey to Australia to face charges of drug smuggling on 2 August 2022. Zahed was charged with first degree murder on 29 August 2022. Duax Ngakuru was arrested in Turkey on 14 January 2023 on charges of drug smuggling. Allan Meehan, the new national president was convicted of violating the Serious Crime Prevention Order issued against him by the New South Wales police on 6 July 2023. Alex Vare became the new boss in 2023. In October 2023, Turkish Minister of Internal Affairs Ali Yerlikaya publicly announced on Twitter that, Turkish police has detained 37 "full patch" members of the gang in Istanbul. The Australian police have stated that many of the drugs sold by the Comanchero come from the port of Vancouver, which is controlled by the East End Vancouver chapter of the Hells Angels. Superintendent Jared Taggart of the Australian Federal Police stated that despite the violent clashes between the Australian Hells Angels and the Comancheros, that: "It’s that ever-evolving business model of transnational serious and organized crime and their willingness to co-operate together, even when they say that they’re enemies and that they don’t co-operate. That’s all really smoke and mirrors. It’s all about power, control and harm on our communities."

== Australian national leadership ==
The Comanchero Motorcycle Club's internal leadership arrangements have not always been publicly documented, and some reported dates are approximate. The following table lists individuals publicly identified as the club's Australian national president, acting national president or supreme commander.

Leader	Position	Reported term	Notes
William George "Jock" Ross	Founder and supreme commander	1968–2002	Ross, a Scottish-born former soldier, founded the Comanchero Motorcycle Club in Sydney in 1968 and named it after the 1961 film The Comancheros. Adopting the title of "supreme commander", he developed the club along strict, militaristic lines and became known for an authoritarian leadership style that demanded personal loyalty from members. During the 1970s and early 1980s, Ross established the Comanchero as one of Sydney's most formidable outlaw motorcycle clubs. His leadership was challenged in 1983 when internal disagreements caused the organisation to divide into two chapters. The breakaway Birchgrove chapter, led by Anthony Mark Spencer and supported by the Campbell brothers, subsequently joined the American-based Bandidos Motorcycle Club and formed that club's first Australian chapter. The split developed into an armed conflict between the Comanchero and Bandidos. On 2 September 1984, Ross led an armed group of Comanchero members to a motorcycle swap meet at the Viking Tavern in Milperra, where a shoot-out between the clubs resulted in the deaths of four Comanchero members, two Bandidos and 14-year-old bystander Leanne Walters. Ross was seriously wounded after being shot in the head and body. He was later convicted of murder and sentenced to life imprisonment, with the trial judge finding that Ross was primarily responsible for the decision to attend Milperra in force and while armed. He was released on parole in December 1989 after serving approximately five years and three months, and his murder conviction was subsequently reduced to manslaughter on appeal. After returning to the club, Ross attempted to rebuild its strength and resisted efforts associated with the Rebels Motorcycle Club Led "Australia 2000" movement to consolidate or absorb independent motorcycle clubs. The Comanchero recruited heavily during the late 1990s as it sought to remain independent, but the influx of younger members created a growing internal faction that rejected Ross's increasingly rigid leadership. In 2002, Mahmoud "Mick" Hawi and a group of younger Comanchero members confronted Ross and forcibly removed him from power, reportedly taking his club colours and motorcycle. The confrontation ended Ross's approximately three-decade leadership, and Hawi subsequently assumed control as supreme commander.
Mahmoud "Mick" Hawi	Supreme commander	2002–2009	Hawi rose rapidly through the Comanchero after joining the club in the late 1990s and displaced founder William George "Jock" Ross as its leader in 2002. Young, highly visible and closely associated with a new generation of Sydney members, Hawi became the club's dominant national figure and one of Australia's most prominent outlaw motorcycle gang leaders. His reign marked a transfer of power away from the club's original leadership and coincided with the expansion of the Comanchero's influence in Sydney. Following the 2005 Cronulla riots, Hawi publicly called for calm and took part in efforts to prevent further retaliatory violence. In November 2007, he survived an apparent assassination attempt when shots were fired at a vehicle in which he was travelling outside a Leichhardt restaurant. The final years of his leadership were dominated by an increasingly violent rivalry with the Hells Angels Motorcycle Club. On 22 March 2009, Hawi and other Comanchero members confronted Hells Angels members and associates at Sydney Airport after encountering them on a flight from Melbourne. The ensuing public brawl resulted in the death of Hells Angels associate Anthony Zervas. Hawi was arrested and charged with murder, riot and affray, ending his tenure as supreme commander, and Duax Ngakuru subsequently assumed the national leadership. Hawi was convicted of murder in 2011, but the conviction was overturned on appeal. He later pleaded guilty to manslaughter and in 2015 was sentenced to six years and two months' imprisonment, with a non-parole period of three years and six months. After his release, Hawi remained a prominent former leader and continued to hold influence among sections of the club. On 14 February 2018, he was fatally shot while sitting in his vehicle outside a gym in Rockdale, Sydney. Police described the shooting as a planned and targeted attack, while prosecutors later alleged that his murder was connected to an internal Comanchero power struggle involving leadership, influence and control of the organisation; the precise motive has not been conclusively established by a court.
Duax Ngakuru	Supreme Commander	2009–2011	Ngakuru became Supreme Commander in late 2009 after Mahmoud "Mick" Hawi was imprisoned while awaiting trial over the fatal Sydney Airport brawl. His brief tenure coincided with a violent conflict between the Comanchero and the Sydney-based Notorious Motorcycle Club, which media reports linked to a dispute over a large quantity of heroin. The conflict involved assaults, shootings and arson attacks. Notorious member Saber Murad was shot dead outside his home in November 2010 amid the broader dispute, although Ngakuru was never established to have ordered or participated in the killing. The following month, Coogee Ink, a tattoo parlour associated with Ngakuru and his close associate Mark Buddle, was firebombed in an attack believed to be connected to the conflict. Ngakuru left Australia for Turkey in 2011, ending his tenure as Supreme Commander , and was succeeded by Buddle. While based in Turkey, he maintained a close association with Australian–Turkish fugitive Hakan Ayik,whom he had reportedly known since attending high school in Sydney. Authorities later alleged that Ngakuru and Ayik jointly led an international organised-crime network involved in drug trafficking across several countries, with Ngakuru allegedly providing access to the Comanchero's distribution network. He remained an influential international Comanchero figure and was arrested by Turkish authorities in Istanbul in January 2023 during an investigation into alleged transnational drug trafficking.
Mark Buddle	National president	2011–2016	Buddle became national president in 2011, succeeding Duax Ngakuru, and was widely described by Australian media and law-enforcement agencies as the national boss of the Comanchero. His senior allies reportedly included Melbourne commander Mick Murray and national sergeant-at-arms Tarek Zahed. Buddle's tenure was marked by repeated arrests and imprisonment. He participated in a violent brawl at Melbourne's Spearmint Rhino nightclub in December 2011 and later pleaded guilty to affray, intentionally causing injury and two assault charges, receiving a 15-month prison sentence in 2014. In July 2015, he was arrested while attempting to leave Australia with approximately $60,000 in undeclared cash and later received a suspended prison sentence. Buddle left Australia for the United Arab Emirates in 2016 while wanted for questioning and regarded by New South Wales Police as a person of interest in the unsolved 2010 shooting death of security guard Gary Allibon; he has not been charged with Allibon's killing. His departure ended his tenure as Australian national president, and Murray assumed control of the club's domestic operations as acting national president. From 2017, Buddle continued asserting authority over the organisation from overseas as its self-described "world commander", including circulating a message stating that new chapters and action against members required his permission. He retained the reported international position until he was detained overseas and deported to Australia in August 2022, when he was arrested and charged with importing and conspiring to import more than 160 kilograms of cocaine, valued by police at approximately $40 million, into Melbourne in May 2021.
Mick Murray	Acting national president	2016–2022	Murray, who had served as commander of the Comanchero's Melbourne chapter, became acting national president in 2016 after national president Mark Buddle left Australia. Australian media widely described Murray as the club's national boss and most senior leader operating inside Australia. Murray had previously been reported as a close ally of Buddle, and during his national leadership the club's senior power structure was reported to include Murray, national sergeant-at-arms Tarek Zahed and senior Sydney commander Allan Meehan. Murray's tenure was nevertheless affected by tensions between the club's Victorian and New South Wales factions. Following a 2017 confrontation involving members from the two states, Buddle reportedly attempted to reassert his authority over the organisation from overseas. Murray retained control of the club's Australian leadership and resumed his duties after serving a prison sentence for contempt of court in 2018. His tenure ended on 28 April 2022, when he was arrested and charged with murder in connection with the 2019 shooting death of Mitat Rasimi. Allan Meehan subsequently became national president. Later in 2022, media reports alleged that Murray sought to regain the national leadership from Meehan, contributing to a renewed internal power struggle.
Allan Meehan	National president	2022–2023	Meehan became national president in 2022 after acting national president Michael "Mick" Murray was arrested and charged with murder on 28 April 2022. Murray was charged in connection with the March 2019 shooting death of Mitat Rasimi in Dandenong. Meehan's appointment followed an internal contest for the leadership involving senior Comanchero member Tarek Zahed. During Meehan's tenure, he was subjected to a Serious Crime Prevention Order restricting his movements, associations and use of encrypted communications. In February 2023, Meehan was arrested in Queensland and extradited to New South Wales over alleged breaches of the order. He was replaced as national president by Bemir "Benji" Saracevic in March 2023.
Bemir "Benji" Saracevic	National president	2023–2024	Saracevic was named national president in March 2023 after Allan Meehan was detained and removed from the position. Australian media described Saracevic as a Melbourne-based house painter and a senior, long-standing member of the club. His tenure was brief, and by August 2024 ABC News described him as a former national president and identified Meehan as having returned to the position.
Allan Meehan	National president	2024–2026	Meehan had returned to the national presidency by 2024. He was reportedly stood down during an internal leadership power struggle in July 2026.

== Perth chapter ==
The Comancheros established a single Western Australian chapter in 2010 which is located on Wellman Street, Northbridge, at the Fitness and Fight Centre.

The Comanchero expansion into Western Australia was delayed by the 2010 arrest of Steve “Shorty” Milenkovski who was about to be patched as the Perth's Chapter Commander when he was arrested in the culmination of Operation Baystone. Operation Baystone resulted in Milenkovski, Yavuz Ozan, Hao Bi, and Mark Vick Kitos being charged with various drug offences. The operation seized 7.5 kilograms of methamphetamine brought to Western Australia from New South Wales.

In August 2012 Milenkovski was found guilty of two counts of Possess a Prohibited Drug with Intent to Sell or Supply after a 9-week Perth District Court trial and sentenced to 17 years jail as the "king pin". Two of his co-accused, were convicted of one charge each of attempted possession including David “Tano” Tanevski who was sentenced to eight years' jail. Hao Bi, who was alleged to have been the courier was acquitted.

In May 2014 eight men including two patched members of the Comanchero were charged for allegedly extorting businesses in Northbridge, Western Australia.

On 15 May 2025, former Western Australian Comanchero sergeant-at-arms Leslie “Lethal Les” Grantham, aged 51, was left outside Rockingham General Hospital suffering multiple gunshot wounds and burns to his legs. Grantham had previously been sentenced to two years' imprisonment for his involvement in the Northbridge extortion operation and was described in court reporting as a former club sergeant-at-arms. Western Australia Police described the 2025 incident as a targeted attack and said Grantham was a senior patched member who had held a position of authority within the club. Police believed he had been attempting to leave the organisation and suspected the burns were inflicted in an attempt to remove his club-related tattoos. He was transferred to Royal Perth Hospital in a serious but stable condition.

On 5 March 2026, the Western Australia Police Force led a coordinated Taskforce Morpheus operation targeting the Comancheros across Australia and New Zealand. Police executed 51 search warrants and conducted 37 Firearms Prohibition Order compliance checks. The operation resulted in 56 arrests, 168 charges and four referrals for possible visa cancellation, as well as the seizure of illicit drugs, firearms and cash. In Western Australia, five alleged members or associates were arrested and charged with 14 offences relating to drugs, firearms, cash and motor vehicles.

== Other chapters ==
Notorious criminal Vince Focarelli was kicked out of the Hells Angels. He then joined other clubs including the Comancheros, and set up his own club. He left the Comancheros later. He and his son Giovanni were shot at by unknown assailants in 2012. Vince was sent to the Royal Adelaide Hospital and his son died. He refused to name any suspects even though this was not the first time he was targeted. While Vince was in hospital, he was visited by friends who were Finks members. Some Finks members also visited the funeral of Giovanni.

In July 2023, Alen Mordian, a senior Comanchero gang member, was shot dead by unknown persons. A few months later, a senior gang member and his sister were arrested, with drugs and weapons being seized.

By 2018, the Comancheros had expanded to New Zealand. The migration of outlaw bikers from Australia into New Zealand had been driven by the Australian Government's policy of deporting convicted non-citizen felons under Section 501 of the Migration Act 1958. The Comancheros used social media to recruit young people into their gang and became involved in the methamphetamine black market. In mid-September 2024, the New Zealand Police charged 41 members and affiliates of the Comancheros with a total of 137 charges and seized NZ$9.2 million worth in assets following a complex three-year investigation. Police alleged that the Comancheros chapter was operating as an organised crime group involved in money laundering, drug importation and distribution, and a "Commission" scheme to fund military-style training for some of its members. The New Zealand Herald also reported that a former US Marine had trained Comanchero members in combat drills and military tactics as part of a "Ghost team."

== Infighting ==
On 5 September 2012, Comanchero member Faalau Pisu was murdered, being shot in the head outside the Serbian National Defence Council at Canley Vale, New South Wales whilst attending a wedding. A 25-year-old gang member and a 27-year-old associate of the club were also shot and injured. NSW Police allege that an internal rift within the Comancheros was behind recent shootings involving Comanchero members.

It was later revealed by authorities and media that the Comancheros were at conflict with the Rock Machine Motorcycle Club, who had been partially responsible for the infighting. Members of Rock Machine chapters in New South Wales had reported links to a Serbian organized crime group and used that influence to patch over members of the Comanchero Motorcycle Club in mid 2012, causing tension with existing Sydney Comancheros. One of those Rock Machine members to patch over, Faalau Pisu, would be shot dead at a wedding in south-west Sydney on November 5. Two days later, the Rock Machine Sydney chapter retaliated against the Comancheros for the murder of Pisu. Comancheros member, John Devine, was shot six times at a construction site in Rhodes. Devine was the cousin of Comancheros leader, Mark Buddle. Australian authorities also reported tensions between the Rock Machine chapter in Maroubra and the Comancheros in Milperra. The situation would resolve itself, with Mark Buddle, being forced to flee Australia due to a litany of charges against him for unrelated matters.

== See also ==
- List of outlaw motorcycle clubs
- Criminal Law (Criminal Organisations Disruption) Amendment Act 2013
- William George "Jock" Ross
- Mahmoud "Mick" Hawi
- Duax Ngakuru
- Mark Buddle
- Mick Murray
- Allan Meehan
- Tarek Zahed

== Books ==
- Edwards, Peter (2010), The Bandido Massacre; A True Story of Bikers, Brotherhood and Betrayal, HarperCollins Publishers Ltd, ISBN 978-0307372765
- Sher, Julian; Marsden, William (2010). Angels of Death: Inside the Bikers' Empire of Crime. Toronto: Alfred Knopf Canada. ISBN 9780307370327.
