= Hakan Ayik =

Australian drug trafficker (born 1979)

Hakan Ayik (born 31 January 1979), also known as Hakan Reis, is an Australian and Turkish drug trafficker. He was described in June 2021 as "Australia's most wanted man".

== Early life ==
Ayik was born in Australia to parents from Turkey. His father died when he was young, with many family members being drug users. His cousin and brother later ended up in prison. He studied at James Cook Boys Technology High School in Kogarah, New South Wales. A classmate of Ayik was Duax Ngakuru, the future boss of the Comanchero gang.

== Criminal career ==
In the 2000s, Ayik was running a large criminal empire. He held ownership of karaoke bars and brothels in Sydney and Canberra. He reportedly travelled to Dubai, India and Hong Kong in luxury. His activities were involved with the Comanchero Motorcycle Club. He is also said to have worked with corrupt customs officials and jail officers in Australia and Tonga. The drug importations he engaged in were estimated to be valued in the hundreds of millions of dollars. This business was organised in co-operation with the Sam Gor Chinese triad. He was also alleged to have planned to set up drug manufacturing in India. In 2010, Ayik became known as 'the Facebook gangster' after showing off his lifestyle in social media. However, in August that year he was the subject of an Interpol notice, surfacing in Cyprus, where he was arrested but escaped on bail.

Ayik was also known for introducing encrypted communications platform to the criminal world, first Phantom Secure, which was taken down by the Federal Bureau of Investigation and the Australian Federal Police in 2018. Ayik played an unwitting yet key role in the ANOM sting operation, which involved the distribution of an encrypted messaging app with an intentional backdoor for American and Australian law enforcement. Due to the high reputation he had in the criminal world, he was selected by law enforcement as a vector for distributing the application. He was initially given access to the application by an undercover agent, and, thinking it was legitimate, spread it among his extensive network of criminal contacts .

== Current life ==
He currently resides in Turkey, where he operates the Kings Cross Hotel in Istanbul and reportedly has altered his facial features through plastic surgery. He has a Dutch wife and children and he has given up his Australian passport according to journalists. He is alleged to have continued associating with other crime figures in Istanbul, as well as to be targeted for his role in spreading the ANOM app. He has been indicted by the FBI for Racketeer Influenced and Corrupt Organizations Act conspiracy and faces up to 20 years in prison if convicted. Ayik was arrested on 1 November 2023 in Istanbul by Turkish police.

== See also ==
- Organised crime in Australia
- Turkish mafia
