= Notorious Motorcycle Club (Australia) =

Former gang that was based in Sydney, Australia

Notorious MC
- Founded: 2007
- Founded by: Allan Sarkis
- Founding location: Sydney, New South Wales, Australia
- Years active: 2007–2012
- Territory: Sydney
- Ethnicity: Arabs (mostly Lebanese) Pacific Islanders and Punjabis
- Membership (est.): Unknown
- Criminal activities: Drug trafficking, arms dealing, extortion, prostitution, money laundering, drive-by shootings, armed robbery, murder, assault, kidnapping
- Allies: Parra Boyz (Asesinoz MC)
- Rivals: Bandidos, Comancheros and Hells Angels

The Notorious or Notorious MC was a former gang that was based in Sydney, Australia and were associated with the Ibrahim Family, an ethnically Lebanese Australian family with both proven and alleged links to organized crime. They claimed to be an outlaw motorcycle club; however, not all members ride motorcycles. A large percentage of its membership consisted of petty criminals, with no real history of bikers among their ranks. Its emblem features a skull with a turban brandishing twin pistols and the words "Original Gangster" beneath it, along with the motto "Only the dead see the end of war". Labeled as one of Australia's most dangerous gangs, they had been feuding with larger and well-known motorcycle gangs including the Hells Angels and the Bandidos. It was thought that as of March 2012 the gang no longer existed as an organised structure after being dismantled by a police operation arresting key members and with other members choosing to quit the gang life. This served to reinforce claims by established MCs that Notorious wasn't a genuine club.

== Overview ==
=== Creation ===
Established in 2007, Notorious was formed by senior members and associates of the Nomads motorcycle gang, after the Parramatta Nomads branch was disbanded. The newly formed gang, founded by Alan Sarkis, then started to recruit youth of Middle Eastern background and aligned itself with street gangs to boost its numbers to gain supremacy over rival gangs.

=== Members ===
The exact number of Notorious members is unknown to police but sources claim the gang has up to 7000 active members. Its members are sometimes called "Nike bikies", for wearing expensive Nike running shoes (Nike Air Max and Nike TNs usually the footwear of choice), fashionable T-shirts and being clean shaven, in contrast to the traditional bikie image of dirty jackets, leather boots and beards.

Police have named John Ibrahim, a celebrity nightclub entrepreneur and his three brothers Sam, Fadi and Michael Ibrahim as senior members of Notorious. Allan Sarkis has been named as the president of Notorious but police believe Sam Ibrahim formed the gang and is the driving force behind it, Ibrahim denies creating Notorious but admits knowing its members.

== Involvement in crime ==
Allan Sarkis, President of Notorious, disputes that the club is involved in organised crime and denies knowledge of a feud with other gangs. He claims the club has a very strict policy on drugs, even though Notorious members as young as 14 have been charged with possession and drugs supply. In an interview with the Sydney Morning Herald, Sarkis stated "Linking us to drugs, or the drug trade, is way out of line. We want to be acknowledged and respected as a motorcycle club, not as gangsters."

=== Timeline ===
- March 2007, Rugby League stars Jarryd Hayne and Mark Gasnier were involved in a brawl with Notorious members at Sydney's Kings Cross, where a Notorious member fired gunshots toward the football stars. This was the first time that new gang appeared on police radar.
- October 2008, Allan Sarkis escaped death after a bomb exploded under his luxury car. The $90,000 car was parked under his exclusive Lane Cove apartment complex. It is believed the Comancheros were behind the bombing.
- On 5 October 2008, senior Notorious member Todd O'Connor was executed in a back street in the Sydney suburb of Tempe. The Sydney Morning Herald reported that Notorious is believed to be involved in a dispute with other outlaw motorcycle groups for control of the drug trade in Kings Cross and Oxford Street.
- October 2008, champion thaiboxer Brad "The Bull" is believed to have executed a rival member next to a phone box he was using. Although no charges have been laid, Notorious have been linked to the shooting.
- January, 2009, Notorious is suspected of being behind the shooting of a tattoo parlour and bombing of a Hells Angels clubhouse.
- February 2009, several Notorious members wearing balaclavas entered a clubhouse and shot three members of the Nomads motorcycle gang.
- 20 March 2009, relatives of Notorious members were the targets of several drive-by shootings across Sydney. The Bandidos are suspected to be responsible.
- 22 March 2009, a wild shootout between Notorious and Banditos members took place in a Sydney street, involving six homes in three streets, leaving two men aged 18 and 17 in hospital.
- 29 March 2009, an un-exploded bomb was placed by Notorious members at the family home of a senior Bandidos member – police received a tip-off from the public and the Bomb Squad rushed to the scene but the Bandido member and his family refused to leave their home.
- June 2009, Fadi Ibrahim, brother of John Ibrahim and a member of Notorious, survived a murder attempt. He was shot five times while sitting in his Lamborghini parked outside his Castle Cove mansion.
- September 2009, Fadi Ibrahim and his younger brother Michael were charged with plotting to murder bikie associate John Macris.
- May 2010 - Jihad Murad, a senior member of Notorious and his girlfriend came under attack after a car pulled up next to them at a street light and fired 12 shots into their car. Those in the vehicle survived but police believe the Comancheros, who are involved in a violent feud with Notorious were responsible for the attack.
- August 2010, Hameed Ullah Dastagir was charged with attempted murder for allegedly stabbing 21-year-old Giovanni Focarelli in the stomach and chest outside his father's Hindley Street tattoo parlour in Adelaide, South Australia. Dastagir was wearing a Notorious jumper during the attack and witnesses claim hearing Focarelli say "Notorious got me" while stumbling back into his father's tattoo parlour.
- October 2010 - president Allan Sarkis and another senior member of Notorious were charged by police after attacking two members of the Comanchero Motorcycle Club at a cafe in Bondi. One of the Commancheros had his ankle broken by one of the Notorious members during the attack.
- November 2010, Armani Stelio - the sister of the Ibrahim brothers had her family home peppered with bullets. More than 20 shots were fired into her home and nearby cars. Lawyers for the Ibrahim family claim they were "wrongly targeted", although investigators fear revenge attacks.
- November 2010, just hours after the drive-by shooting of Armani Stelio's family home, Saber Murad, a member of Notorious was gunned down outside his home. In a statement, police revealed that "There are links between the Notorious crime gang and both locations."
- December 2010, "Coogee Ink", a tattoo parlour owned by senior Commancheros was firebombed with Notorious being the prime suspects. The parlour is owned by Comanchero national president Duax Ngakuru and his right-hand man Mark Buddle. The Daily Telegraph revealed Mark Buddle, 32, was attacked by Notorious members outside a Bondi cafe in October 2010.
- 13 January 2011, oldest brother Sam Ibrahim was shot in the legs in a drive-by outside his parents' home in Merrylands in Sydney's south west.

== See also ==
- List of outlaw motorcycle clubs
- Criminal Law (Criminal Organisations Disruption) Amendment Act 2013
