= Milperra massacre =

1984 gang gunfight in Milperra, Australia

- Milperra (Australia)
Date	2 September 1984
Location	Milperra, Sydney, New South Wales, Australia

Belligerents
Comancheros	Bandidos

Strength
19	34

Casualties and losses
4 dead	2 dead
- 1 dead bystander 28 wounded

The Milperra Massacre, Milperra bikie shoot-out or Father's Day Massacre was a gunfight between rival motorcycle gang members on 2 September (Father's Day in Australia) 1984, in Milperra, a south-western suburb of Sydney, New South Wales. The gunfight had its roots in the rivalry that developed after a group of Comancheros broke away and formed the first Bandidos Motorcycle Club chapter in Australia. Seven people were killed and twenty-eight injured and the event was a catalyst for significant changes to gun laws in New South Wales.

== Prelude ==
Police believe that the war began over turf, drugs or a combination of both. The clubs had a no drugs policy and Colin "Caesar" Campbell, Sergeant-at-Arms of both Comanchero chapters and Sergeant-at-Arms of the Bandidos after they were patched over, points to the acrimony of the split as the sole reason. According to Campbell, in late 1983, one of his brothers and another Comanchero had called on another member and caught the Comancheros' president (and founder) William George "Jock" Ross, in a compromising position with the member's wife. As Sergeant-at-Arms, he ordered Ross to face charges of breaking one of the ten club rules. (Note: Comanchero Club Rule 4: "Any member found guilty of screwing another member's Ol' Lady, or taking advantage of a rift between them for future conning up, will be thrown out") If found guilty, Ross would have been expelled from the club. Ross failed to appear at the first two meetings and after arriving at the third, simply announced that the club would be split into two chapters and walked out. Those who supported bringing charges against Ross, the six Campbell brothers, the three McElwaine brothers, Anthony "Snodgrass" Spencer (Snoddy) and Charles "Charlie" Sciberras remained at the Birchgrove clubhouse that overlooked Yurulbin Park while Ross and the remaining Comancheros set up a new clubhouse in Harris Park.

During the club's 1983 Christmas run fighting broke out between the two chapters, prompting the Birchgrove chapter to break away and form a new club. Spencer had visited several outlaw clubs in America two years earlier and remembered how much respect U.S. Bandidos showed to him, so he contacted their National President Ronnie Hodge. After much correspondence, he received approval to form the first Australian Bandidos chapter and become its national president. The new Bandidos members then incinerated their Comanchero colours in a ceremonial act. Clubhouse attacks and other violence continued until August when Campbell alleged that Spencer and Ross "declared war" in a phone call.

== Fight ==
A British motorcycle club swap meet, advertised in the local press, was held at the Viking Tavern from 10:00 a.m. on Sunday, 2 September 1984. Around 1:00 p.m., 19 armed Comanchero members entered the tavern car park and hid. Using walkie-talkies for communication, Comanchero leader "Jock" Ross, a military enthusiast, planned to stand in the open to draw the Bandido members into a pincer movement based on the "Bullhorn Ambush" used in the Anglo-Zulu War. Members of another rival club, the Mobshitters, were present and Ross went to the back of the tavern to ensure they would not get involved.

The Bandidos were late. Thinking they were not coming, some Comancheros went into the bar. About 20 minutes later, 34 armed Bandidos members arrived. Caught off guard, the Comancheros were scattered around the car park. The Bandidos arrived at the west of the car park, distributed guns and other weapons, and led by their sergeant-at-arms Colin "Caesar" Campbell confronted the Comancheros. With Campbell were his brothers and his "adopted brother" Mario Cianter; Spencer remained in his car.

Campbell walked up to Comanchero sergeant-at-arms Phillip "Leroy" Jeschke when another Comanchero Ivan "Sparra" Romcek stepped into his path and forced a shotgun against his chest. The initial confrontation saw the brandishing of weapons and challenges to 'drop the guns and settle it like men', but the accidental discharge of a shotgun into the air triggered a melee. Contrary to some newspaper reports, there was no charge or battle lines. Unmentioned by the media nor charged, several wives and girlfriends of the club members took part.

Campbell grabbed Romcek's shotgun before he could fire it, but was knocked down from behind by the Comanchero Ian "Snow" White. White aimed his shotgun at the Bandido George "Zorba" Kouratoras, who was hit from behind by one of the girlfriends of the Comancheros. Kouratoras punched her and knocked her down, then Romcek hit him with his rifle butt in the stomach. Jeschke fired the first shot, apparently by accident as he was pointing his gun upwards. The Bandido Lance Wellington knocked out White. Geoff "Snake" Campbell was shot by a shotgun; his older brother Colin tried to help him but was also shot.

There were shots coming from everywhere. There was people ducking for cover, people reaching into cars for firearms. It wasn't very long before the windscreen of the car I was sitting in got smashed by a bullet and I had bits of lead pellet in my face and glass, I was covered in glass from the windscreen. The noise was incredible. It wasn't just the shots which were coming from everywhere. There was people smashing each other with lead pipes, with baseball bats, with chains, people screaming in agony. It all happened so quickly that you'd blink and suddenly there was three bodies on the ground. There were so many children there, there was people throwing their children over the fence. There was a pregnant woman lying in the middle of the car park with her husband who was with me and he was wanting to, to go and get her

— Linda Motton

Bystander Linda Motton was reading in her car when she was hit by shotgun pellets fired by Gregory "Shadow" Campbell, meant for the Comanchero Glen Eaves. Motton was angry that the bikers had turned the car park into a battlefield and took photographs; they were key evidence at trial as they showed who was where.

Eaves, an on-leave reservist with the Australian Army, moved and fired repeatedly using cars as cover. Gregory Campbell was shot in the throat by a shotgun and bled to death. Campbell's brother was charged with the murder: all involved in the affray were charged with first-degree murder regardless of who the victim was.

Bandido Cianter shot Comanchero Robert "Foggy" Lane in the chest using a .357 Magnum Rossi rifle, killing him within a minute. Cianter then shot Jeschke with shot to the heart. Cianter attempted to shoot Raymond "Sunshine" Kucler and instead killed bystander Leanne Walters, who had been watching the fight, with a shot that severed the lower part of her jaw and her spinal cord. Cianter continued to shoot at Kucler and wounded him. Kucler took cover behind a car and shot Cianter twice with his shotgun, severing his aorta and striking his head.

Outnumbered and taking greater losses, the Comacheros were able to push back the Bandidos, who retreated behind the Holden lorry of Philip Campbell. Ross' para-military training of the Comancheros included advancing under fire. Philip Campbell, with Lance Wellington, James "Roach" Posar, and Charlie Scibberas attempted to place his badly wounded brother John "Whack" Campbell into the lorry to take to hospital. Kucler and Eaves fired on the lorry, Wellington being struck in the face by broken glass and the lorry being disabled. The Bandidos dragged their wounded into bushes under fire, including the heavily bleeding Geoff and Gregory Campbell. Eaves was attacked by Grant "Pig" Everest with a water pipe. Eaves aimed at Everest's chest and then shot him in the knee. Everest lay on the ground and the girlfriend of a Comanchero broke his nose with a metal bar.

Those in the tavern were watching a film and unaware of the fight, until the Comanchero Kevork "Kraut" Tomasian stumbled in with his left arm almost severed by a shotgun. Ross ran from the back of the tavern holding a machete and a pick handle. He was shot in the foot, head, and chest by a shotgun, and collapsed. Spencer stayed in his car despite having a gun, which led his men to label him a coward.

Police responded after receiving reports that a man had gone berserk with a rifle and shots had been fired. The fighting continued for at least ten minutes while police helicopters circled. The public had fled to the tavern and nearby properties when shooting started. The first of more than 200 police arrived 15 minutes after the fighting ended and cordoned off the area. Two Comancheros died from shotgun wounds, two more died from rifle shots, two Bandidos died from shotgun wounds, and a 14-year-old bystander, Leanne Walters, died after being hit in the face by a rifle shot. Twenty-eight people were wounded, 20 requiring hospitalisation.

In the middle of it all, the pub staff were still selling beer. People actually sat in the hotel drinking while the war was going on outside. I will never forget the sight when I arrived that day. The car park was packed with leather-clad bikies, police and ambulance officers treating the injured. One sergeant arrived with a young constable and commented, 'Take a look at this son because you’ll never see anything like it again'. The bikies appeared to be quite proud of what they had done.

— Ron Stephenson, who led the police investigation, 1994

Constable John Garvey who arrived at the scene said, "The wounds on the men were horrific. I mean, those sorts of weapons can do some terrible damage". Garvey was confronted by Kucler, armed with a shotgun. Garvey recalled: "Kucler was covered in blood and appeared to have a wound below one eye. He was very pent-up; you could see the anger and emotion in his eyes. The situation had suddenly changed, and I knew it was a critical moment in which my life was in danger. Here I was armed with a shotgun facing a very angry man with a shotgun he had obviously used; it was not something I could walk away from. Kucler wanted me to get ambulances to help his injured mates, but I told him we couldn’t until he surrendered his weapon. We argued, and finally he said he would give up his gun if I did the same." They placed their shotguns on the ground and Kucler surrendered to be arrested.

Colin Campbell was shot six times and spent six weeks in intensive care before discharging himself. Four shotgun pellets remained in his body, which were dug out by his wife before he fled to Western Australia. Campbell later claimed that the wife of one of the Comancheros had shot him several times with a handgun.

Mark Pennington, one of the first police officers on the scene, was later awarded $380,000 (2011: $1,026,500) compensation for psychological damage. Bandido John Campbell never recovered and died in jail from complications in 1987. Ross suffered a brain injury, losing much of his vision as well as the ability to read and write. The Viking Tavern has since been renamed the Mill Hotel.

An anonymous man who took part in the shoot-out said in 2014, "Milperra was catastrophic; it was a ridiculous and terrible thing to happen. We have all paid a terrible price, and we will never be allowed to forget it or escape from it...Milperra changed everything. We came from all walks from life—optometrists, engineers, clerks, and blue collar workers—and all had our reasons for being there (in a motorcycle gang). Many of us just wanted to escape our dreary lives; escape for one night a week, dress up like Marlon Brando, and be a wild one". Stephenson dismissed later claims made by both the Comancheros and Bandidos that no violence was planned for the swap meet: "I simply can’t accept that. They knew it was going to happen, and both gangs were prepared for the fight. They had declared war on each other, and once that happens, you can be assured a full-scale battle will take place if they meet in public".

Casualties and bystanders
Name	Allegiance	Comment
Leanne Walters	None	bystander
Mario "Chopper" Cianter	Bandidos	Bandidos Vice President
Gregory "Shadow" Campbell	Bandidos	
Robert "Foggy" Lane	Comanchero	Comanchero Vice President
Phillip "Leroy" Jeschke	Comanchero	Comanchero Sgt-at-Arms
Ivan "Sparra" Romcek	Comanchero	
Tony "Dog" McCoy	Comanchero	

== Aftermath ==
=== Trial ===
The court case following the "Milperra Massacre" was at the time one of the largest in Australian history. In total 43 people were charged with seven counts of murder under the doctrine of "common purpose" charges against 10 were dropped before trial and Bernard "Bernie" Podgorski, secretary of the Bandidos, was granted immunity after turning Queen's Evidence. Solicitor Christopher Murphy acted for the Bandidos' members charged over the incident. Greg James QC represented all but one of the Bandidos' members during their trial, the exception being Colin Campbell, who was represented by Greg Woods QC. Greg James QC was Juniored by a number of Juniors, including John Korn, Kenneth Rosin, Andrew Martin and Philip Young. Anthony "Snoddy" Spencer, the Bandidos National President, hanged himself in prison before he could stand trial. Michael Alan Viney QC was the lead Crown Prosecutor for the committal hearing and the trial.

During the longest joint criminal trial in New South Wales history, 58 policemen provided security, including armed members of the Tactical Operations Unit who were stationed in the courtroom, and witnesses required armed guards from the Witness Security Unit to escort them home. With 31 accused, each by law able to reject 20 jurors without giving a reason, 1,500 jurors were called up and housed at the Penrith Leagues Club to await selection. The first day of selection saw only five jurors accepted from 208 presented. The following day, it was found that two were ineligible, causing presiding judge Justice Adrian Roden to dismiss all five and order that jury selection begin again. Eventually, some 1,000 jurors were presented before 12 were found acceptable to sit on the case. More than two years later, on 12 June 1987, the jury delivered 63 murder convictions, 147 manslaughter convictions, and 31 of affray. Justice Roden named the instigator of the violence as William "Jock" Ross, the "supreme commander" of the Comancheros, saying "Ross was primarily responsible for the decision that members of his club go to Milperra in force and armed."

Ross received a life sentence for his role in the violence. Four other members of the Comancheros gang received life sentences for murder, and 16 Bandidos received sentences of seven years for manslaughter. As the Bandidos arrested were charged in regards to all the deaths, this resulted in Colin Campbell being found guilty of the manslaughter of his brother. Another Campbell brother, John "Wack" Campbell, died three years later from his injuries. Commonwealth Games gold medallist boxer Philip "Knuckles" McElwaine was found guilty only of affray; he was the only motorcycle club member to be acquitted of the manslaughter and murder charges that were brought against him. (Note: McElwaine was a volunteer at the Police and Community Youth Club, and police acted as character witnesses for him, stating that he was "a monument to the police boys' movement as a whole.") In 1989, three Comancheros appealed their murder convictions with the charge quashed and reduced to manslaughter. In 1992, Ross was the last to be released after serving five years and three months.

=== Changes to gun laws ===
The Comancheros were notorious for carrying registered shotguns openly while riding. As a result of the massacre, the New South Wales Firearms and Dangerous Weapons Act 1973, which allowed registered owners the right to carry firearms in public, was subsequently amended to require "a good reason for the issue of a [firearm] licence". (Note: For example, rural landholders, members of an approved gun club and persons engaged in lawful business involving the use of firearms were deemed to have a good reason and the police could refuse to issue licences to any persons they saw as not having a good reason.)

=== Resumption of hostilities ===
In a repetition of the circumstances that led to the Milperra massacre, in early 2007 more than 60 members of the Parramatta and Granville chapters of the Nomads, previously affiliated with the Comancheros, defected to the Bandidos. The defection resulted in a new eruption of violence between the Comancheros and Bandidos involving fire-bombings and drive-by shootings. New South Wales Police set up Operation Ranmore to stop the violence escalating, which resulted in 340 people arrested on 883 charges as of January 2008.

== Dramatisation ==
In 2002, Australian film maker Martin Brown produced a documentary titled 1% One Percenters Search for a Screenplay in an effort to raise interest for a big budget movie of the massacre. The documentary, first aired on 2 February 2003, follows Brown as he looks for screenwriters, funds and a director for his movie. It includes interviews with the police investigating officer, former superintendent Ron Stephenson, Comanchero president "Jock" Ross, Bandido vice president "Bullets," and several other Milperra survivors.

A television mini-series Bikie Wars: Brothers in Arms, based on the book Brothers in Arms by Lindsay Simpson and Sandra Harvey, screened on Australia's Network Ten in May 2012. The screenplay was written by Greg Haddrick, Roger Simpson and Jo Martino. It is directed by Peter Andrikidis. It stars Callan Mulvey, Matt Nable, Susie Porter, Maeve Dermody, Anthony Hayes, Todd Lasance, Luke Ford, Jeremy Lindsay Taylor, Damian Walshe-Howling, Nathaniel Dean and Luke Hemsworth. Colin "Caesar" Campbell criticised the series for not consulting with those who were there, presenting an incorrect chronology of events and motives, and portraying "lazy stereotypes."

== See also ==
- List of disasters in Australia by death toll
