= Nable =

Nable is a surname. Notable people with the surname include:

- Adam Nable (born 1975), Australian rugby player
- Matt Nable (born 1972), Australian actor, writer and rugby player
