= William "Jock" Ross =

Scottish-Australian outlaw biker (born 1943)

Jock Ross
- Born: William George Ross; 5 August 1943 (age 83); Glasgow, Scotland
- Occupations: Outlaw biker Combat Engineer in the British Army Royal Engineers; NSW Rural Fire Service Brigade Captain
- Years active: 1968–2002
- Known for: Founder of the Comancheros
- Successor: Mick Hawi
- Allegiance: Comanchero MC
- Convictions: Murder (1986), reduced to manslaughter upon appeal (1992)
- Penalty: Life imprisonment; paroled in 1989

William George "Jock" Ross (born 5 August 1943) is a Scottish-born Australian outlaw biker, best known as the founder and the "Supreme Commander" of the Comanchero Motorcycle Club and for his involvement in the Milperra massacre of 1984. Ross was sentenced to life imprisonment with Judge Roden childing him as one of the men most responsible for the shoot-out at the Viking Tavern.

== Youth ==
Ross was born in Glasgow, Scotland into a working-class family. Ross grew up in the Gorbals neighbourhood of Glasgow, where his father worked as a lorry (truck) driver. Ross stated of his youth: "In the old Glasgow days you never backed off, that’s how you survived. The Gorbals was tough and you had to be tough too." He served for 7 years in the British Army in the Royal Engineers, having joined at the age of 17. As a combat engineer, he was involved in clearing minefields left over from the Second World War in Libya as well as laying minefields in the Aden Protectorate (modern Yemen) and Hong Kong. After his honourable discharge, he settled in Australia, making his home in New South Wales. In 1966, he settled in a coastal flat and then moved to Point Clare. Ross-who was known to his friends as "Jock" instead of William-worked variously as a lorry driver and as an apprentice blacksmith.

== The Comancheros ==
=== The "Supreme Commander" ===
Ross befriended a number of Australian veterans of the Vietnam War, saying in a 2019 interview: "I came out of the army, came here. People come out of the army, especially soldiers coming back from Vietnam back in the '70s, the late '70s … they came, and they were treated like lepers … not real good. Me, as an ex-soldier, I empathised with them". Ross founded Comanchero Motorcycle Club in 1968 with the name being taken from a 1961 John Wayne Western film The Comancheros that Ross adored. The Australian journalists Lindsay Simpson and Sandra Harvey described Ross as a natural "leader of men", an extremely charismatic man whose machismo and toughness inspired much devotion from other men. In 1971, Ross purchased a property along the then rural Mangrove Mountain Road for $800 that became his home. Settling with Ross in his caravan were his first wife Sandy and their infant daughter Deidre. Ross found the sunny New South Wales countryside to be a refreshing change from the decaying industrial neighbourhoods of the Gorbals where he had grown up. Ross's only major weakness was that he believed in ghosts, and was terrified of the spirits that he believed wandered around the New South Wales countryside at night. In particular, Ross was convinced that his caravan was haunted by the ghost of a 19th-century gold prospector who had drowned in a nearby creek along with the ghost of a lorry driver who had crashed on a highway close to his home.

Ross had known a number of motorcycle riders who liked to drink in the pubs along a coastal road north of Sydney and persuaded them to join the Comancheros. Ross led the Comancheros in series of brawls against another outlaw biker club, the Knights over the course of 1973. In May 1973, Ross executed an ambush of the Knights when he sent an emissary to the Tall Timbers Hotel in Ourimbah to say that Ross and a few other Comancheros were having a keg party out in the bush. When the Knights arrived at the party, Ross along with the entire Comancheros were waiting for them and carried out the ambush that Ross had carefully prepared. During the course of the fight, Ross was run over by a Knight in his motorcycle, breaking his leg and causing him to have a slight limp thereafter. Ross continued his feud with the Knights by laying in wait for them along in the bushes along the coastal roads and he would try to shoot them with his rifle when he saw them. Simpson and Harvey wrote: "Jock Ross had by then built an aura around himself. Even the police with whom he had his earliest dealings spoke of him with respect. He was the sort of man the police admired, a man with a fearsome reputation, someone to be reckoned with". That Ross beat up a "pug" (a professional fighter) in a bar brawl contributed to the respect that the police felt for him. In response to a warning from Sergeant Max Lamond of the Newcastle police that his feud with the Knights was getting out of hand, Ross relocated the Comancheros to the Sydney suburb of Parramatta. Ross hung a sign on the wall of the Comancheros' clubhouse that read: "If it's white, sniff it/If it's female or it moves, fuck it/If it narks-kill it". One member who joined the Comancheros in 1974 who idolised Ross was Anthony "Snodgrass" Spencer who saw him as a surrogate father who provided him with the love he never received from the father he had never known. Peter Edwards, the crime correspondent of The Toronto Star, described Spencer as very much a surrogate son to Ross.

Ross had an intensely authoritarian leadership style shaped by his military background and he gave himself the grandiose title of the "Supreme Commander". He was described as leading with "an iron fist". His favorite magazine was Soldier of Fortune, an American magazine catering to mercenaries and more commonly men who fantasise about being mercenaries. Like many other outlaw bikers, Ross's politics tended towards the extreme right and he had a gigantic Nazi swastika flag prominently hanging on the wall of the Parramatta clubhouse. Ross had the new members of the Comancheros swear allegiance to not only the Comanchero club, but also to himself as the "Supreme Commander". Ross led his men on weekly para-military drills intended to prepare them for brawls against rival bikers. The Comancheros were considered to be the most violent of Australia's many outlaw biker clubs in the 1970s and 1980s as Ross was constantly engaged in biker wars. The Canadian journalists Julian Sher and William Marsden wrote that Ross was well known for planning his attacks "with military precision". Sher and Marsden described Ross as a man with "disturbing visions of running his own private army". Besides for the endless drilling, Ross formed his own elite force of especially tough fighters, which he called the Strike Force. Many of the younger Comancheros who joined the biker gang in the late 1970s-early 1980s disliked Ross as one former member told the media: "If I wanted to march around in the fuckin' backyard, I would had joined the fuckin' army".

In 1980, Ross's first marriage ended in a divorce. That same year, the Comanchero had 20 members, but 7 suddenly resigned with Ross's former wife Sandra moving in with one of the members who had resigned, leaving the club with 13 members. Over the next three years, Ross expanded the Comanchero to 45 members, many of whom did not share the reverence that the members who joined the 1960s or 1970s did. In the early 1980s, Ross founded a fencing contracting business and was successful enough to be able to afford to buy a house in a middle class district in the West Pennant Hills. Ross started to date a single mother, Vanessa Eaves, whom he met in a bar. Ross described Eaves as the ideal "biker girl" who had a "a bit of fire" in her, but was ultimately submissive and docile towards her boyfriend. In the outlaw biker subculture, the girlfriends and wives of the bikers are considered to be "property" as the "biker girls" are treated as sex slaves who can be sold or bought. Simpson and Harvey wrote: "Comanchero men owned their women. Vanessa accepted this". Relations between Ross and Spencer went into decline when Spencer was not invited to Ross's second wedding in 1983. Ross's bride, Vanessa Eaves, had vetoed having "Snoddy" Spencer at the wedding under the grounds that: "Snoddy is always stoned and you know how stupid he gets. I'm not going to have him ruin my wedding".

In June 1983, the Comancheros became involved in a dispute with the Loners Motorcycle club. Ross led a raid on the Loners' clubhouse that ended with the three Loners present at the time of the raid being beaten bloody. Ross then suggested a meeting to discuss a truce, which proved to be a ruse. When the Loners arrived in the back alley for the meeting, they were surrounded and beaten up by a superior forces of Comancheros armed with baseball bats who took away their "colours". Ross forced the Loners to become a "feeder club" (i.e. a puppet club) for the Comancheros, which he named the Bandileros. There was continuing tension between the former Loners versus the original Comancheros. In addition, many Comancheros disliked Ross's leadership style, which was considered to be too authoritarian. The British journalist Annie Brown described Ross as "manipulative, violent and domineering". Colin "Caesar" Campbell, one of the anti-Ross Comancheros alleges that he and his brothers discovered that Ross was having an affair with another member's wife, which was a violation of the Comanchero rules. Ross had already come into conflict with "Caesar" Campbell who along with his brothers Philip "Bull" Campbell, Gregory "Shadow" Campbell, John "Whack" Campbell and Geoff "Snake" Campbell formed the core of the anti-Ross faction in the Comanchero. In July 1983, Ross had a shouting match with "Caesar" Campbell at a club meeting over the size of the clubhouse with Campbell demanding that the Comanchero move to a bigger clubhouse. Joined by his brothers along with Spencer, Campbell stormed out of the meeting.

The spokesman for the discontent in the ranks was Spencer. To avoid having to answer the charges that he violated his own rules against sleeping with the wife of another Comanchero, Ross split the Comancheros into two chapters; the ones unhappy with his leadership, led by Spencer, were assigned to a new chapter in Birchgrove. The Birchgrove chapter at 105 Louisa Road with Spencer as the chapter president opened in August 1983. Shortly afterwards, Ross was involved in an incident when he attempted to enter a pub in Kings Cross while being visibly drunk. Ross was refused admittance by the pub's Maori bouncers and was beaten up when he attempted to force his way in. Ross called upon all Comancheros to join him in beating up the bouncers in revenge, and was furious when Spencer declared that the Birchgrove chapter would not be involved. Spencer's decision to declare his neutrality was in turn sparked by his resentment at being excluded from Ross's wedding, which he took as a personal insult.

Continuing tensions between the two chapters led to the Birchgrove chapter under Spencer breaking away to join the Bandidos Motorcycle Club in November 1983. In February 1984, Ross opened up a new chapter under his leadership in Harris Park. Ross demanded the return of the former Comanchero colours, a demand that was only partially met as a number of the Comanchero colours had been mailed off to Texas, which proved to be a major sore point. Ross saw "Caesar" Campbell as the real leader of the Bandidos with Spencer just a puppet president. Ross had T-shirts made that featured a photograph of Campbell's face with a X drawn across it along with the caption "Nail Caesar".

=== The Milperra Massacre ===
Over the course of 1983 and 1984, relations between the Bandidos and the Comancheros grew increasingly tense. On 26 July 1984, a Comanchero tried to drink at the barroom of the Royal Oak Hotel in Parramatta, only to be informed by two Bandidos present that the Royal Oak was a "Bandido hotel" and that he could either leave or be beaten. On the evening of the next day, Ross along with his sergeant-at-arms, Philip "Leroy" Jeschke and another Comanchero marched into the barroom and Ross told the barman, Graham Marshal, "three beers, mate!" When he was refused service, Ross exploded in rage and asked why the Bandidos were allowed to drink at the Royal Oak Hotel while his men were not. Marshal was in the process of again refusing service when Jeschke swung his fist at him while Ross threw his bar stool at a cabinet full of alcohol and glasses behind Marshall. Content at the damage he had done, Ross told Marshall "no-one tells me where my men can drink!" On the evening of 4 August 1984, Ross paid for the petrol for his 1981 Electraglide Harley-Davidson motorcycle and then went riding towards Ermington. During his ride on Marsden Road he found himself followed by a white Holden van that attempted to run him over, leading to a wild chase down the road as Ross raced ahead of the van with his motorcycle tilting at a dangerous 45-degree angle. After being bumped by the van several times, Ross finally lost control of his motorcycle, which somersaulted and threw him onto the ground. The van stopped, two men stepped out whose faces Ross could not make out in the darkness, but who drove away when Ross forced himself to his feet despite his injuries. Later that night, Ross phoned his wife Vanessa to tell her: "Those cunts have done it this time. They've run me off the road. I had a full petrol tank. The fucking thing could have exploded. Those fucking Bandaid arseholes, I could have fucking died. They meant to kill me". Vanessa Ross reported that she had never seen her husband as angry as he was that night. Vanessa Ross phoned Robert "Foggy" Lane, the Comanchero vice president to inform him: "You've got to put a stop to this, Robbie. It's just got to end. The petrol tank was full you know, the bike could have exploded".

Following an incident on 9 August 1984 when three Comancheros were beaten up by the Bandidos at the Bull and Bush Hotel, the two clubs became involved in a biker war starting on 11 August 1984. Later on 11 August, Ross had the Comanchero clubhouse fortified. During a phone call, Ross and Spencer laid out their rules for their biker war such as no fights in public places or the homes of members, which both sides completely ignored. Ross believed wrongly that Spencer and the other Bandidos were terrified of him, and all that was required was a show of force on the part of the Comancheros to win the biker war. Early on the morning of 2 September 1984 Ross was angered when his brother-in-law, Glen Eaves, who also a Comanchero, told him in a phone call that the Bandidos had ridden by his house led by the Campbell brothers, which he took as a personal insult. The Bandidos told Eaves that they would be attending the swap meeting at the Viking Tavern in Milperra later that day and dared the Comanchero to show up. Ross then phoned Lane to tell him: "The Bandaids [Ross's term of abuse for the Bandidos] could be going to the swap meet. A few of our boys plan to go, so I reckon we should all go-as many that can. There could be trouble". Ross assembled all of the Comancheros to tell them that they were going to the Viking Tavern with weapons including guns, and then shouted "Okay men, let's move it out!" Going with Ross to the Viking Tavern were Robert "Foggy" Lane, Phillip "Leroy" Jeschke, John "Littlejohn" Hennessey, Garry "Pee Wee" Annakin, Ian "Snow" White, Ivan "Sparrow" Romcek, Raymond "Sunshine" Kucler, Michael "Tonka" O'Keefe, Terrence Parker, Glen Eaves, Andrew Thomas, John "Blowave" Bodt, Scott "Bones" Dive, Rick "Chewy" Lorenz, Tony "Dog" McCoy, Robert "JJ" Heeney and Kevork "Kraut" Tomasian. Vanessa Ross would had preferred that her husband spend Father's Day with her and their infant daughter, Holly, but he insisted the Comanchero was more important to him than spending time with his family.

On 2 September 1984 at the parking lot of the Viking Tavern in the Sydney suburb of Milperra, the two gangs clashed during a swap meet hosted by the British Motorcycle Club of Sydney. During a swap meet, used and new motorcycle parts along with motorcycle-related memorabilia and trinkets were put on the market while barbecue food and alcohol were sold in plentiful quantities. Despite his later claims at his trial in 1985 and 1986 that no violence was planned, Ross had his men armed with knives, baseball bats, shotguns and rifles as he knew that Spencer and the Bandidos would be attending the swap meet that day. Ross devoted much time beforehand to plotting an ambush as he planned to have the Comancheros encircle the Bandidos when they arrived at the Viking Tavern. Ross and the Comancheros had arrived first at about 1 pm, armed and ready for a fight should the Bandidos arrive. Ross planned to use himself as bait by standing in the centre while the rest of the Comancheros would stage a "bullhorn" ambush. Ross had learned about the "horns of the bull" ambush tactic used by the impis (regiments) of the Zulus in the 19th century from a history book he had read.

Ross arrived at the Viking Tavern being driven by his brother-in-law, Glen Eaves. The fact that the Comancheros were armed led to complaints from the people attending the swap meet, and Mike Langley, the owner of the Viking Tavern, went over to talk to the Comancheros. Ross was walking around with a machete labelled "Bandaid Hair-parter", and introduced himself to Langley: "My name is Jock Ross. What's the problem?" Langley told Ross: "I'm the publician and this is a peaceful day. I don't want any trouble-I want the weapons put away". Ross replied: "There won't be any trouble unless the Bandaids turn up". Langley in turn told Ross: "Look here, mate. I want no trouble, period. Now, put the weapons away". Ross ignored the request to put away the weapons and instead ordered the Comanchero to take positions for the ambush. Langley told the manager of the Viking Tavern that he felt uneasy about the fact that several of the Comancheros had guns, but decided not to call the police. Ross's ambush plan was aborted when the Bandidos failed to arrive at the time they were expected.

The Bandidos were half an hour late to the swap meet. Ross had failed to anticipate that Spencer and the other Bandidos would also be well armed as the Comancheros. By the time Bandidos arrived, the Comancheros were out of formation, giving up the advantage of a strong defensive position. Ross had gone into the Viking Tavern to drink and was still drinking when the Bandidos finally arrived. During the clash in the parking lot of the Viking Tavern, the Comancheros and Bandidos fought each other with their fists, baseball bats and guns. Upon hearing the shooting out in the parking lot, Ross left his pint of beer, ran outside waving about a machete in the air and shouted "Kill 'em all!", only to be shot down by the Bandidos. Ross used his machete to try to behead a Bandido, Bobby Watkin, who ducked just in time to save his head. Ross lost interest in Watkin when he saw another Bandido, Charlie Sciberras, charging at him while swinging his machete at him. Sciberreas stated that Ross still had his glasses on despite all of the carnage around him and there was pure hatred in his eyes. Sciberras fled across the parking lot with Ross in hot pursuit, intent upon his using his machete to behead him when another Bandido, Tony Melville, tried to take on Ross with his baseball bat. When Melville saw a Comanchero aim his shotgun at him, he fled with Ross in hot pursuit screaming "get him, get him!" Melville was hit in the leg with a shotgun blast and fell to the parking lot, bleeding with Ross racing up with his machete intent upon finishing him off. At that point, Ross was hit with shotgun pellets in his face that shattered his teeth while leaving him disoriented. A second shotgun blast to his chest finally knocked Ross down. As he lay bleeding on the parking lot, another Bandido smashed in his face with a baseball bat. Ross was only saved by the wailing of a police siren in the distance, which caused his assailant to abandon the attack. By the time the police arrived, four Comancheros, two Bandidos and Leanne Walters, an innocent teenage girl caught in the crossfire, were all dead. Ross took shotgun pellets to the brain and shrapnel in his chest, but survived his wounds.

== Trial and Imprisonment ==
In the aftermath of the massacre, 43 men were charged with murder. Ross was charged with "constructive first degree murder", meaning that though he had not killed anyone himself, that the Crown felt he was responsible for the killings. The Crown in its indictment of Ross alleged that his position as the Comanchero "supreme commander"; his orders to his followers to arm themselves beforehand with a variety of weapons; and his decision for the Comancheros to go to the Viking Tavern in the full knowledge that violence was likely to occur made him just as guilty of murder as the men who actually pulled the triggers and killed during the Viking Tavern incident. Ross was released from Liverpool Hospital on 26 September 1984 and moved to the Prince Henry prison hospital.

As he recovered despite having 30 shotgun pellets permanently lodged inside of his body, Ross was moved to the Long Bay Metropolitan Remand Centre as he was denied bail and ordered to wait in jail for his trial. At Long Bay, Ross resumed his para-military training for the other 15 Comancheros imprisoned as the Crown had successfully convinced a judge to deny them all bail. Ross was held with his men at first, and then moved to a single cell with a view of the ocean. Ross decorated his cell with photographs of his wife Vanessa and their daughter Holly-Anne along with photographs of motorcycles. Ross did not object to jail food, which he stated reminded him of the British Army food that he had been served during his time with the Royal Engineers. Jail made Ross a more tolerant man than he had been before as he declared in a typically bombastic speech: "You'll always get all races and creeds comin' up here: chinks, slopeheads, wogs-all different races-and probably before they came in here they hated each other's guts. But once you start working together and doin' a bit together, one teaches another how to do something, it creates a much more relaxed atmosphere".

The trial under Justice Anthony Roden in 1986-1987 lasted 332 days and cost $12 million Australian dollars, making it one of the longest and most expensive trials in Australian history. Ross's testimony on 13 November 1986 was the media event of that day in Australia, being covered by all of the major newspapers and television stations. Ross had taken brain damage as a result of the shotgun blast to his head and lost the ability to read and write as he admitted in his testimony. Simpson and Harvey wrote that the tone of Ross's voice, which they described as a "no-nonsense sort of growl which commanded attention" led him to dominate the courtroom as he testified. Ross portrayed himself as a victim and took no responsibility for what happened, saying that he had been forced off the road on 4 August 1984 while on 9 August 1984 a group of Bandidos led by Spencer had beaten up a group of Comancheroes at the Bull and Bush Hotel. Ross argued that it was Spencer who was the aggressor and that he had been forced into the biker war by him. Against the Crown's theory that he was guilty of "constructive first degree murder", Ross claimed that he had gone to the Viking Tavern with the intention of killing no-one. As Ross described how took two shotgun blasts, Melville interrupted his testimony by saying: "He's superhuman. The only that could hurt him is Kryptonite and soap". Ross's testimony was notable for the amount of rage he expressed on the stand as he saw himself as a victim as he stated on the stand: "The only reason I am here as far as I can see is not for what I have done. It is who I am". Ross's display of rage on the stand as he accused the Crown of persecuting him for being an outlaw biker is believed to have made a poor impression on the jury as he came across as an angry man capable of anything. On 11 June 1987, Justice Roden argued for the jury a summary of the Crown's case against Ross during which Ross was notably agitated in the courtroom.

Ross was convicted of first-degree murder and affray (fighting in public) and sentenced to life imprisonment with Roden chiding him as one of the men most responsible for the shoot-out at the Viking Tavern. As the jury announced its verdict, Ross stared at them, giving them a cold look of contempt and hatred. Justice Roden in his verdict stated that: "Ross was primarily responsible for the decision that members of his club go to Milperra in force and armed". Ross served his sentence at the Long Bay Central Industrial Prison.

In 1989, an appeal court agreed to hear Ross's appeal of the verdict and in 1992 the appeals court ruled in his favor. Ross's conviction was reduced from murder to manslaughter, which reduced his sentence. Ross served a total of 5 years and three months in Long Bay prison and was released on parole on 7 December 1989 per the "complicated" parole rules in Australia. Ross received an automatic one-third remission in his first degree murder sentence because it was his first major criminal conviction and received further remissions in his sentence by taking adult education courses and industrial skills courses.

== Later life ==
Ross together with his wife Vanessa settled in the Wiseman's Ferry area in rural New South Wales after his release from prison. In a 2019 interview Ross stated: "We got here in late '93 and, um, the January fires started. All this place was on fire, so I went down to help, and I stayed. I'm still there, 25 years later." Ross worked as a volunteer captain with the New South Wales Rural Fire Service at Spencer while Vanessa Ross serves as a dispatch caller. Ross states that his body is still full of shotgun pellets from the Father's Day massacre as he noted that he took: "Quite a few shots...head, neck, chest, face".

In an interview in 1994 to mark the 10th anniversary of the massacre, Ross stated: "I can look at myself in the mirror and know that I was not to blame...I did not cause what happened. Of course I regret what happened. I lost four good men and we got totally screwed. I was the one who ended up being shot up, so how could I have killed anyone? They judged me for who I am, not what I did." In another interview, Ross stated: "I was blamed for the club splitting because I like things done in a military style; I still do". Ross has never expressed any guilt over the Milperra massacre and instead sees himself as a victim. The British journalist Annie Brown wrote in 2001: "Jock expressed no feelings of remorse and accepted no responsibility for the killings. In his militaristic mind, the dead were simply casualties of war."

In January 1994, representatives of six major biker gangs, namely the Hells Angels, the Outlaws, the Bandidos, the Rebels, the Black Uhlans and the Nomads, attended a gang summit in Sydney and informally decided to align under a decree known as the "Australia 2000 Pact". The pact insisted that criminal activities in Australia would be controlled by the six core gangs by the year 2000. A consolidation began in 1994 as the larger biker gangs eliminated the smaller biker gangs, which caused 35 murders between 1994 and 2000. The Comanchero, which were not part of the "Australia 2000 Pact" fiercely resisted the attempts to have them disband. Starting in the late 1990s, the Comanchero Motorcycle Club took in a massive number of young men with a Middle Eastern background to provide more manpower as part of their struggle to resist the "Australia 2000 Pact". Many of the younger criminals led by a Lebanese immigrant, Mahmoud "Mick" Hawi, resented Ross's leadership. In 2002, Hawi led a group of younger Comancheros to meet Ross at his house. The Australian policeman Duncan McNab in his 2013 book Outlaw Bikers in Australia wrote that: "Ross was unsuspecting and outnumbered and the discussion was quick and violent. The Comancheros, led by Mick Hawi, delivered a comprehensive beating to the much older leader. They left him battered and took both his club colours and his Harley-Davidson. It was the outlaw equivalent of spitting in Jock's face." In 2003, Hawi proclaimed himself to be the new Comanchero national president and "supreme commander".

In the 2012 television mini-series Bikie Wars: Brothers in Arms, Jock Ross was played by Matt Nable. In the spring of 2019, Ross made the news again when as part of his fireman duties he rescued a man and his dog from a burning house by using his shoulder to smash down a locked door, and then pulling the men and his dog from the house. Alison Wade of the New South Wales Rural Fire Service told the media in 2019: "He's the sort of person who really rallies around to get a team together". In September 2019, Ross was badly injured when he was run over by Nicola Annabel Teo, the daughter of the famous brain surgeon Charlie Teo. The police have alleged that Teo was engaged in careless driving at the time of the traffic incident. Ross was in a coma for four months after the accident and both of his legs had to be fitted with titanium plates to allow him to walk again. On 21 June 2021, the Crown dropped the charges against Teo just hours before she was due to go on trial on charges of "dangerous driving occasioning grievous bodily harm".

== Books ==
- Coulthart, Ross; McNab, Duncan (2009). Dead Man Running. Sydney: Allen & Unwin. ISBN 9781741768794.
- Edwards, Peter (2010), The Bandido Massacre; A True Story of Bikers, Brotherhood and Betrayal, HarperCollins Publishers Ltd, ISBN 978-0307372765
- Haynes, William (2014). Hell on Wheels: An Illustrated History of Outlaw Motorcycle Clubs. Minneapolis: Quayside Publishing. ISBN 9781627881432.
- McNab, Duncan (2013). Outlaw Bikers in Australia The Real Story. Sydney: Macmillan Australia. ISBN 978-1742612942.
- Morton, James; Lobez, Susanna (2011). Gangland Sydney. Melbourne: Melbourne University Publishing. ISBN 9780522860399.
- Sher, Julian; Marsden, William (2010). Angels of Death: Inside the Bikers' Empire of Crime. Toronto: Alfred Knopf Canada. ISBN 9780307370327.
- Simpson, Lindsay; Harvey, Sandra (2012). Brothers in Arms: Bikie Wars. Sydney: Allen & Unwin. ISBN 978-1743311905.
- Veno, Arthur (2004). The Brotherhoods: Inside the Outlaw Biker Clubs. Sydney: Unwin & Allen. ISBN 9781459616110.
