= Anthony Mark Spencer =

Australian outlaw biker (1955–1985)

Anthony Spencer
- Born: Anthony Mark Spencer; 1955; Sydney, New South Wales, Australia
- Died: 28 April 1985 (aged 29–30); Parklea, New South Wales, Australia
- Other name: "Snodgrass"
- Occupations: Outlaw biker, sailor
- Known for: Founder of the Bandidos in Australia
- Allegiance: Comanchero MC (1974–1983); Bandidos MC (1983–1985)

Anthony Mark Spencer (1955 – 28 April 1985) was an Australian outlaw biker noted for his role in the Milperra massacre of 1984.

== "Throw-away kid" ==
Spencer was born into a broken home, and was not even certain if Anthony Mark Spencer was his birth name as he grew up in a series of foster homes in the Sydney area. He never knew his father while his mentally ill mother committed suicide. As a "throw-away kid" whom no-one ever really cared about, he was a sad, lonely child who desperately sought love and affection, which he never received.

While he was "in care" at an Anglican boys home at the age of 11, he was seized by the other boys who forced his head into a full bathtub in an unsuccessful attempt to drown him. The incident left Spencer with an intense aquaphobia (fear of water). A barely literate boy, he took to writing out his feelings in a diary full of spelling mistakes, a habit that was to endure for the rest of his life. Spencer alternated between moments of intense depression where he would cry for hours and a stoic acceptance of his "fate to be a boy to be despised".

== The Comancheros ==
In an attempt to conquer his aquaphobia, Spencer joined the Royal Australian Navy at the age of 17. Spencer was so unused to affection that he was known to break into tears of joy when any of the other sailors showed him any kindness. During his brief career in the navy, Spencer took to heavy drinking and marijuana use, both of which proved to be lifelong habits. After his discharge from the navy at the age of 19, Spencer joined the Comanchero Motorcycle Club led by "Jock" Ross. He was so desperate to join the Comancheros that he lied about his military service, claiming to have served in the Australian Army and to have fought in the Vietnam War, claims that had no foundation in reality. Spencer came to see the Comancheros as a surrogate family and "Jock" Ross as his surrogate father who gave him the love that he had never received from the father he had never known. His biker name was "Snodgrass" or "Snoddy" for short.

Spencer's relations with Ross started to decline when he was not invited to Ross's wedding. Ross's bride, Vanessa Eaves, had vetoed having Spencer at the wedding under the grounds that: "Snoddy is always stoned and you know how stupid he gets. I'm not going to have him ruin my wedding". Spencer was greatly hurt at being excluded from Ross's wedding. Spencer formed a common-law relationship with his girlfriend, Lee Denholm. Having a stable relationship also weakened his loyalty to Ross as he no longer needed his approval to feel loved. In 1982, Ross broken the Comancheros into two chapters with one remaining under his leadership while Spencer became the president of the new Birchgrove chapter. By this point, Spencer was complaining that Ross – whom he had once revered – was treating him like a child in need of his strict supervision. Ross attempted to enter a Kings Cross pub while clearly intoxicated and was refused admittance by the pub's Maori bouncers. When Ross tried to force his way in, he was beaten up. Ross demanded that all of the Comancheros join him in seeking revenge for the beating, and was enraged when Spencer refused to have the Birchgrove chapter involved. Relations between the two chapters started to go into a rapid decline.

In one of his first acts as a chapter president, Spencer visited the United States to buy parts for Harley-Davidson motorcycles, which were both difficult and expensive to obtain in Australia at the time. The trip to the United States was Spencer's first visit outside of Australia as until then he had lived his entire life in New South Wales and Queensland. In Albuquerque, New Mexico, Spencer met Ronnie Hodge, the president of the Bandidos Motorcycle Club whose headquarters are in Houston, Texas. When Hodge told him that he was willing to open a pipeline for selling both legitimate and stolen motorcycle parts in Australia, Spencer jumped at the chance and took him up on his offer. In return, Hodge wanted Spencer to export chemicals legal in Australia to the United States. At the time, P2P, one of the chemicals necessary for manufacture of amphetamines, was legal in Australia, but not in the United States. The Bandidos wanted an alliance to have P2P smuggled into the United States to assist with manufacturing amphetamines, the market for which they dominated in Texas. Peter John Hill, the president of the Hells Angels Melbourne chapter, had been shipping P2P to the American Hells Angels, and Hodge wanted to copy that arrangement. Hodge offered to teach Spencer how to make amphetamine. Hodge had once served in the United States Marine Corps, and formed a strong rapport with the former sailor Spencer, who admitted to him that he found Ross to be too overbearing. Upon his return to Australia, Spencer was already talking about joining the Bandidos.

== The Bandidos ==
=== National president ===
In November 1983, the Birchgrove Comanchero chapter under Spencer broke away to form the first Australian chapter of the Bandidos. Ross demanded the return of the former Comanchero "colours", a demand that was only partially met as a number of the Comanchero colours had been mailed off to Texas, which proved to be the source of much ill-will. Spencer appointed Colin "Caesar" Campbell to be his sergeant-at-arms. The Australian journalists Lindsay Simpson and Sandra Harvey wrote that Spencer seemed ill-suited for leadership as there was a "permeant feeling of uneasiness about him. He was their leader, he made the decisions, but leadership did not sit easily on his shoulders". Over the course of 1983 and 1984, relations between the Bandidos and the Comancheros grew increasingly tense. On 9 August 1984, three Comancheros were beaten up by the Bandidos at the Bull and Bush Hotel, which in turn led to a biker war being declared on 11 August 1984. Over the rest of the month, there were a number of incidents involving shootings, though no deaths, between the two clubs.

=== The Milperra Massacre ===
On 2 September 1984 at the parking lot of the Viking Tavern in the Sydney suburb of Milperra, a swap meet was being hosted by the British Motorcycle Club of Sydney. During a swap meet, used and new motorcycle parts along with motorcycle-related memorabilia and trinkets were put on the market while barbecue food and alcohol were sold in plentiful quantities. Spencer had learned that Ross and the Comancheros were present at the swap meet waiting for him, and decided to confront him rather staying away, which he thought was cowardly. Spencer had called upon his men and armed themselves for the swap meet. Spencer who was determined to prove that he was a brave leader, full of machismo that day, as he stated: "We'll go anywhere to show the other clubs we're not scared. If the Comancheros are there, we'll go ahead as planned. We'll show our colors and bash them". Spencer ordered the Bandidos to bring hunting rifles and shotguns to the swap meet as he expected violence, which later proved to be a crucial part in the Crown's indictment of him for first-degree murder. The Bandidos who did not own guns were told to bring other weapons such as chains, knives, and baseball bats. One of the Bandidos, Bernard Podgorski, turned Crown's evidence and testified at the trial in 1986-1987 that violence was expected at the swap meet, and that the Bandidos went to the Viking Tavern in the full knowledge that a shoot-out was likely. Podgorski testified at the trial that Spencer was a weak leader who attempted to assert his tenuous authority by trying to act tough, hence his determination to "bash" the Comancheros at the swap meet. Spencer was driven to the swap meet in a Holden station wagon car by Stephen "Bear" Robert while Gregory "Shadow" Campbell and Tony "Lard" Melville sat beside him.

The Comancheros led by Ross had been waiting to ambush the Bandidos, but let their guard down when Spencer and the rest were half an hour late to the Viking Tavern. As Spencer arrived at the Viking Tavern, he noticed the Comancheros were present with guns, but decided to continue to avoid looking like a coward. As Robert parked his car, Melville told Spencer: "Fuck, Snoddy, there's Commos out there and they've got guns!". Spencer grasped his shotgun and told his men to go out to confront the Comancheros. The Bandidos led by Colin "Caesar" Campbell marched out to confront the Comancheroes in the parking lot while Spencer refused to get out of Robert's car despite having a shotgun.. Spencer claimed he could do more to "cover" the Bandidos with his shotgun rather than risk his life by joining "Caesar" Campbell and the others. Spencer's claims that he needed to "cover" the Bandidos with his shotgun was manifestly untrue as shotguns fire off bursts of pellets that are only useful for killing at close-range and would be useless if fired from a distance.

It remains unclear even today who fired the first shot, but it is clear that the shoot-out in the parking lot of the Viking Tavern began very shortly after the Bandidos arrived. During the clash in the parking lot of the Viking Tavern, the Comancheros and Bandidos fought each other with their fists, baseball bats and guns. Despite his machismo, Spencer stayed in the car during the shoot-out and only got out to assist with pulling away the wounded. By the time the police arrived, four Comancheros, two Bandidos and Leanne Walters, an innocent teenage girl caught in the crossfire, were all dead. Spencer did not take any responsibility for the shoot-out, telling a policemen "yeah. It's war, real war too. That Scottish cunt, Jock, he caused all of this". Later that night, Spencer met Denholm and broke down in tears as he cried hysterically: "They killed us. Shadow and Chop are dead. They wanted to kill us, babe. They were trying to kill us". At that point, Spencer could say no more and just collapsed amid his tears.

== Suicide ==
In the aftermath of the massacre, Spencer was charged with "constructive first-degree murder". The Crown alleged in its indictment of Spencer that though he did not kill anyone himself, his position as Bandidos national president, his decision to have his followers armed, and to go to the Viking Tavern knowing full well that violence was likely to occur made him just as guilty of murder as those who actually pulled the triggers. He was denied bail and held in Parklea jail. Spencer had never been imprisoned before and told Denholm in a phone call that jail was "another fuckin' institution" just like the Royal Australian Navy and the group homes he had grown up in. Spencer became increasingly depressed in jail and felt especially guilty over Walters's killing.

For Valentine's Day 1985, he received a card with the message "To Dear Snotty, All My Love Leanne Walters. PS: Wish you could be here with me". Spencer was greatly troubled by the macabre practical joke and wrote in his diary for 14 February 1985: "Fuck that upset me. Can't understand why or who would send it. Fuck I didn't kill her. I just feel like killing myself. It's just getting me down cause I know I aint [ain't] guilty". For the last two months of his life, Spencer's diary was relentlessly downbeat, as he often wrote about suicide as the best possible option for him as he deeply disliked jail life. At the same time, his relationship with Denholm went into decline, as her letters to him grew more critical, hinting more than once she would end their relationship if he was convicted of murder.

In one of his last entries in his poorly written diary, Spencer wrote on 13 April 1985: "I fucked it today. I walked out on Lee during the visit. I just had the shits and Lee just said the wrong thing at the wrong time. If I lose her it's my own fault because I acted like a real prick, I s'pose [suppose], but then again I am sure she would have done the same thing". Spencer also started to express the notion in the diary that if he committed suicide then Ross would have all the opprobrium for the Milperra massacre. Spencer wrote in his diary on 22 April 1985: "I think sometimes if I died then things might have been better because then I wouldn't be called a Jock Ross - that hurt me real bad when people said it". Likewise, Spencer's behavior at the Viking Tavern led him to be condemned as a coward, with Colin Campbell who was on the run from the law being most vocal in expressing his contempt for Spencer as a weakling who only pretended to be tough. The perception that Spencer was a coward greatly troubled him, along with the belief that Denholm would leave him for another man once he was convicted and sentenced to life imprisonment on 7 counts of first-degree murder.

On 28 April 1985, Spencer hanged himself in his cell at the Parklea Maximum Security Jail while facing charges of first-degree murder. His badly written suicide note read: "I, Tony Spencer, do not want my wife to have any part in my life or death. Lee Denholm is my lady and Joel is my son and they will get all my belongings. Lee, I am sorrry [sorry] for this, but remember I will always love you and my son. PPS, I want my bros to not think of me as weak, but as tired of fighting for the well being of my club. I have failed my club maybe I don't no [know]. But I do no [know] someone will do the right thing for the club". In the 2012 television mini-series Bikie Wars: Brothers in Arms, Spencer was played by Callan Mulvey. Mulvey admitted in a 2012 interview that the script of Bikie Wars portrayed Spencer very much as a hero while Ross was portrayed as the villain as he noted: "It's hard to get it right for both sides...both sides seem to have conflicting stories and there will be a lot of people who feel Snoddy shouldn't be made a hero or that Jock's been demonised."

== Books ==
- Coulthart, Ross; McNab, Duncan (2009). Dead Man Running. Sydney: Allen & Unwin. ISBN 9781741768794.
- Edwards, Peter (2010), The Bandido Massacre; A True Story of Bikers, Brotherhood and Betrayal, HarperCollins Publishers Ltd, ISBN 978-0307372765
- Morton, James; Lobez, Susanna (2011). Gangland Sydney. Melbourne: Melbourne University Publishing. ISBN 9780522860399.
- Sher, Julian; Marsden, William (2006). Angels of Death: Inside the Bikers' Empire of Crime. Toronto: Alfred Knopf Canada. ISBN 9780307370327.
- Simpson, Lindsay; Harvey, Sandra (2012). Brothers in Arms: Bikie Wars. Sydney: Allen & Unwin. ISBN 978-1743311905.
- Veno, Arthur (2004). The Brotherhoods: Inside the Outlaw Biker Clubs. Sydney: Unwin & Allen. ISBN 9781459616110.
