= Murder of Megan Kalajzich =

1986 murder in Australia

The murder of Megan Kalajzich took place in 1986 in Fairlight, New South Wales, Australia. Although he pleaded not guilty, Andrew Kalajzich, the victim's husband, was found guilty of her murder in May 1988, and sentenced to 25 years in prison without parole. He was released from prison on 8 February 2012.

== Background ==
Murder of Megan Kalajzich
- Date: 27 January 1986
- Location: 31 Fairlight Crescent, Fairlight, New South Wales, Australia; 33.79962°S 151.272469°E
- Cause: Gunshot
- Deaths: Megan Kalajzich
- Suspects: Andrew Kalajzich, Warren Elkins, Franciscus Wilhelmus Vandenberg, Kerry Orrock, George Canellis
- Verdict: All guilty except Canellis (granted immunity)
- Convictions: Kalajzich (life); Elkins (10 years; 5 years non-parole); Vandenburg (life, committed suicide in prison); Orrock (life)

Andrew Kalajzich was born in Australia in 1941, after his parents migrated from Yugoslavia in 1939. He grew up working in his family's fish shop in Manly, and by the age of 25 he and his brother established their own business in Manly.

He married Megan Carmichael in 1962 and they had two children together, Michelle and Andrew.

In the following years Kalajzich became a well-respected and wealthy figure on the Northern Beaches of Sydney. He was elected president of the Manly Chamber of Commerce in 1972, and opened the Manly Pacific International Hotel in 1983.

Just 16 days before Megan's death she was attacked at her Fairlight home at gunpoint, however the gun failed to fire.

In the early morning of 27 January 1986, Megan Kalajzich was shot twice in the head as she slept beside her husband in their home. Two shots were also fired into Andrew Kalajzich's pillow; he claims that he was able to roll out of the way of the bullets.

== Legal proceedings ==
In an 11-week trial at the NSW Supreme Court during early 1988, Andrew Kalajzich was found guilty of the murder of his wife. Evidence was provided that Mr Kalajzich had hired hitman Bill Vandenberg, paying him $20,000 to murder his wife. Therefore, Kalajzich was charged with murder, conspiring to murder, and for the discharge of a firearm with the intention of murder. Vandenberg was also charged, however he killed himself whilst in prison awaiting trial.

Kalajzich vigorously appealed the verdict, culminating in a 1995 judicial enquiry by John Slattery QC (retired Supreme Court Judge), who rejected Kalajzich's appeals, saying that he had "no doubts or questions about the guilt of the petitioner".

Kalajzich and his children have continued to maintain that he is innocent of the charges. After serving 25 years in prison, it was announced on 25 January 2012 that Kalajzich would be released on parole. He was subsequently released on 8 February 2012.

== Media ==
The Megan Kalajzich murder was the focus of the Crime Investigation Australia episode "Contract to Kill".

There was also a book written about the Megan Kalajzich murder by Lindsay Simpson and Sandra Harvey in 1992, entitled My Husband, My Killer: The Murder of Megan Kalajzich.

The book was translated into a television movie in 2001.
