= My Husband, My Killer =

2001 film

- Directed by: Peter Andrikidis
- Written by: Greg Haddrick
- Produced by: David Gould
- Starring: Colin Friels; Martin Sacks
- Cinematography: Joseph Pickering
- Edited by: Neil Thumpston
- Music by: Peter Best
- Release date: 2001
- Running time: 95 minutes
- Country: Australia
- Language: English

My Husband, My Killer is a 2001 Australian TV film about the Murder of Megan Kalajzich. It is based on the book of the same name by Sandra Harvey and Lindsay Simpson. It stars Colin Friels as Detective Inkster and Martin Sacks as Andrew Kalajzich.

== Plot ==
Detective Inkster investigates the murder of Megan Kalajzich and the clues lead him to her husband Andrew, hitman George Cannellis, go between Warren Elkins and the killer Bill Vandenberg.

== Cast ==
- Colin Friels as Bob Inkster
- Martin Sacks as Andrew Kalajzich
- Geoff Morrell as Bob Richardson
- Chris Haywood as George Cannellis
- Craig McLachlan as Warren Elkins
- Lucy Bell as Marlene Watson
- Tara Morice as Margaret Inkster
- Zoe Carides as Lydia Iurman
- Linda Cropper as Megan Kalajzich
- Bridie Carter as Janey
- Abi Tucker as Michelle
- David Field as Bill Vandenberg
- John Clayton as Jim Rope
- Marshall Napier as John Radij
- Ben Gabriel as Andrew Kalajzich
- Firass Dirani as Butch

== Production ==
The movie was filmed over a period of five weeks in mid 2000, using locations around Manly including the actual hotel the Kalajzichs owned and their family home.

== Reception ==
Brian Courtis of The Age gave it a positive review saying "through mesmeric performance, taut editing and the director's sureness of touch, it grips you with all the power of a slowly unfurled murder mystery."

== Awards ==
- 2001 AFI Awards
  - Best Achievement in Direction in a Television Drama - Peter Andrikidis - won
  - Best Performance by an Actor in a Telefeature or Mini Series - David Field - won
  - Best Mini-Series or Telefeature - David Gould, Des Monaghan, Anthony Buckley - nominated
  - Outstanding Achievement in Television Screen Craft - Television Drama - Peter Best - nominee
