= The Final Winter =

2007 Australian drama film

- Theatrical poster
- Directed by: Brian Andrews; Jane Forrest
- Written by: Matt Nable
- Produced by: Anthony Coffee; Michelle Russell
- Starring: Matt Nable; John Jarratt; Raelee Hill; Matthew Johns
- Cinematography: Ian Jones
- Edited by: Matt Villa
- Music by: Adam Gock and Dinesh Wicks
- Distributed by: Paramount Pictures
- Release date: 6 September 2007
- Running time: 96 minutes
- Country: Australia
- Language: English
- Box office: $284,354

The Final Winter is an Australian drama film released in 2007. It was directed by Brian Andrews and Jane Forrest and produced by Anthony Coffee, and Michelle Russell, while independently produced it is being distributed by Paramount Pictures. It was written by Matt Nable who also starred as the lead role 'Grub' Henderson. The film, which earned praise from critics, focuses around Grub, who is the captain of the Newtown Jets rugby league team in the early 1980s, and his determination to stand for what rugby league traditionally stood for while dealing with his own identity crisis. The Final Winter was adapted to the stage in 2015 by Justin Brice and performed in Albury-Wodonga for four nights starting on 15 July to sold-out crowds. Justin Brice is an Albury–Wodonga local performer and stage writer who dedicated three years to crafting the script to fit on a theatre stage.

== Plot ==
The film explores the way in which business tore up the loyalty that was between Grub's club and family. Essentially this is a metaphor for the way in which business began to imprint the game of Rugby League during the 1980s, and saw the rise of commercialism in the game. Consequently, Grub must battle with an administration that wanted him gone and additionally his brother and coach's betrayal. The film also deals with the domestic issues between Grub and his wife and his children, as their husband and father has been transformed from who he was to who he has become.

== Cast ==
- Matt Nable as Mick "Grub" Henderson
- Bob Baines as Neddy
- Conrad Coleby as Billy
- Nathaniel Dean as Trent Henderson
- Damian De Montemas as Max
- Kevin Golsby as Judiciary Chairman
- Raelee Hill as Emma Henderson
- John Jarratt as Colgate
- Matthew Johns as Jack Cooper
- Michelle Langstone as Mia
- Scott Lowe as Muddy
- Katie Nazer-Hennings as Rebecca Henderson
- Tiarnie Coupland as Jessica Henderson

The film also features cameo appearances from Tom Raudonikis, Roy Masters, Thomas Keneally, Jack Elsegood, Max Krilich, Terry Randall, Phil Sigsworth, Noel Kelly Ivan Cleary, Les Johns, Craig Hancock, Terry Serio, Peter Peters, and Australian Wrestling Federation ring announcer 'The Duke of Wrestling' Kieran Burns.
