= Colin "Caesar" Campbell =

Australian outlaw biker and gangster)

Colin Francis "Caesar" Campbell (18 July 1946 – 19 October 2021) was an Australian outlaw biker, gangster, and author noted for his role in the Milperra massacre of 1984.

== From the Comancheros to the Bandidos ==
Campbell was born in Newcastle, New South Wales into a working-class family of Scots descent. Campbell along with his brothers John, Geoff, Gregory, Mario and Philip formed an especially close family. Christine Campbell, the wife of Philip "Bull" Campbell, noted that the brothers Campbell were so close that she felt like an outsider with the brothers despite married to a Campbell. "Caesar" Campbell as the oldest of the Campbell brothers served as their leader. An amateur boxer and an illegal bare-knuckle fighter, in 1969, Campbell started the Gladiators Motorcycle Club of Sydney with his brothers, but then realised a Gladiators already existed up North so he ended his Sydney Gladiators who were not affiliated with the chapter up north. Campbell estimated he was involved in more 800 fights since the age of 14. In 1978, "Caesar" Campbell joined the Comanchero Motorcycle Club and was again followed by his brothers. In 1980, Campbell was promoted up to serve as the sergeant-at-arms.

In the early 1980s, Campbell served as the focal point of opposition to the leadership of William "Jock" Ross, a man whom Campbell had come to strongly dislike. Campbell resented the para-military training Ross had forced upon the Comancheros while Ross was jealous of Campbell's greater popularity with the younger members of the Comancheros. In July 1983, at a Comanchero meeting, a shouting match between Campbell and Ross broke out and which ended with Campbell storming out followed by 9 other Comancheros including Anthony Mark "Snodgrass" Spencer. Under pressure from Campbell who complained that the existing Comanchero clubhouse in Granville was too small, Ross was forced to move the clubhouse to Birchgrove. Campbell, with a couple of his club brothers caught Ross sleeping with the wife of Comanchero, which was a violation of Ross's own rules that he had drawn up. As sergeant-at-arms, Campbell attempted to enforce the Comanchero rules by having a hearing, which Ross avoided by not showing up. Instead, Ross broke the Comancheros up into two chapters with the anti-Ross Comancheros remaining in Birchgrove under the leadership of Spencer while those loyal to him relocated with him to western Sydney. In November 1983, the Birchgrove chapter under Spencer's leadership joined the Bandidos Motorcycle Club. Campbell became the first sergeant-at-arms of the Australian Bandidos and was regarded as being the dominant force within the club.

The split caused much ill-will, and Ross along with the other Comancheros saw Campbell as being the real leader of the Bandidos with Spencer as a puppet leader. Ross focused most of his venom against Campbell instead of Spencer as he sold T-shirts reading "Nail Caesar" along a photograph of Campbell's face with a x crossed against it. On the wall of the new Comanchero clubhouse in Harris Park, photographs of Campbell were posted along with messages such as "kill Caesar" and "Caesar-dickhead, asshole, fuckwit, kill the turkey, gums, son of Jaws. Snodgrass loves Caesar up the ass!" Campbell who was considerably tougher than Spencer tended to dominate the Bandidos despite being the sergeant-at-arms.

== Milperra Massacre ==
On 2 September 1984, Campbell arrived just before the swap meeting at the Viking Tavern in Milperra on his motorcycle armed with a baseball bat at the house of another Bandido. Another Bandido, Bernard Podgorski arrived with guns in the trunk of his car, which Campbell helped himself to. During the confrontation of the parking lot of the Viking Tavern, Campbell led the Bandidos forward while Spencer cowed in his car, too afraid to come out. Campbell was marching up to confront a Comanchero, Phillip "Leroy" Jeschke, when another Comanchero, Ivan "Sparrow" Romcek, stopped him by forcing a shotgun against his face. Campbell ordered Romcek "put the fuckin' gun down, Sparrow", but he refused, through he was clearly nervous.

At point, the melee began. Staying calm, Campbell wrestled the shotgun away from Romcek before he could fire, but stuck in the back with the butt of another shotgun by the Comanchero Ian "Snow" White. As he went down, the Bandido Lance Wellington come to his aid and used his karate skills with good effect on White, knocking him down with a series of karate chops and kicks. As Campbell got up, he saw his brother, Geoff "Snake" Campbell, shot down, causing him to race forward for his brother, only to be struck with a shotgun blast from the Comancheros. One of Campbell's brothers, Gregory "Shadow" Campbell and his "adopted brother", Mario "Chopper" Ciantar, were killed during the fighting. He was shot a third time, by quite possibly by the wife of a Comanchero. Bleeding badly from his head and chest, Campbell was dragged by another Bandido Steven Owens to Podogrski's car. Podgorski drove to the Bankstown Hospital and dumped off Campbell there before driving off.

== Legal proceedings ==
Despite bleeding badly, Campbell was adamant that the doctors could not remove his Bandido biker's vest to treat his wounds. He was found to have multiple puncture wounds caused by shotgun pellets in his shoulder, chest and right arm along with a bullet. He was in intensive care for over a week over the shoot-out. His chest was infected with bacteria, which prolonged his hospital stay and prevented the police from charging him as his sister who was a lawyer argued that the stress of being charged Campbell with murder would hinder his recovery. On 4 October 1984, he signed himself out of the hospital and went underground as a fugitive. He lived under an alias in Perth. He was arrested in February 1986 while visiting his wife Donna in Mount Hawthorn. The Western Australia police charged with first degree murder for all of the seven people killed in the Milperra massacre including his own brother Gregory Campbell. Campbell who had a phobia about flying was flown back to Sydney. As he boarded the plane, he told the policemen guarding him "Well you blokes have made me do something no man could do", and then answered his question by saying "made me get into a bloody aeroplane". He was found guilty in 1987 of manslaughter and affray.

After his release from prison, he settled in the Snowy Mountains region. He still remained involved in organised crime and was shot twice with a rifle in front of his house. Campbell stated that being hit with a .22 rifle was like hit with a stinging blow while hit with a shotgun was like being hit with a baseball bat. His practice of cutting off parts of the fingers of the men he had beaten up led to his wife Donna to ask him to stop bringing home pieces of fingers in jars of vinegar as she maintained that 22 fingers were quite enough. In 2010, he co-wrote with his wife a bestselling book The Enforcer describing his career as an outlaw biker that was promoted as "97 per cent fact and 3 per cent fiction". The book was followed by two sequels, The Wrecking Crew (2011) and The Outlaw and the Hitman (2016). In 2012, he criticised the television series Bikie Wars: Brothers in Arms and how he was portrayed by Anthony Hayes, saying the series perpetuated "lazy stereotypes".

== Books ==
- Simpson, Lindsay; Harvey, Sandra (2012). Brothers in Arms: Bikie Wars. Sydney: Allen & Unwin. ISBN 978-1743311905.
