= Bikie Wars: Brothers in Arms =

2012 Australian TV miniseries

- DVD cover
- Genre: Drama; Miniseries
- Written by: Greg Haddrick; Roger Simpson; Jo Martino
- Directed by: Peter Andrikidis
- Starring: Callan Mulvey; Matt Nable; Maeve Dermody; Susie Porter; Damian Walshe-Howling; Richard Cawthorne; Anthony Hayes; Jeremy Lindsay Taylor; Luke Hemsworth; Luke Ford; Fletcher Humphrys; Nathaniel Dean; Sam Parsonson; Todd Lasance; Aaron Fa'aoso; Manu Bennett
- Country of origin: Australia
- Original language: English
- No. of episodes: 6

Production
- Executive producers: Des Monaghan; Greg Haddrick; Rick Maier
- Producer: Roger Simpson
- Running time: 360 minutes
- Production company: Screentime
- Budget: $6 million

Original release
- Network: Network Ten
- Release: 15 May – 19 June 2012

Bikie Wars: Brothers in Arms is a six-part Australian drama miniseries about bikie gang violence, screened on Network Ten on 15 May 2012. Bikie Wars is based on the book Brothers in Arms by Lindsay Simpson and Sandra Harvey. The screenplay was written by Greg Haddrick, Roger Simpson and Jo Martino. It is directed by Peter Andrikidis. Bikie Wars: Brothers in Arms cost A$6,000,000 to make.

== Premise ==
The six-episode series dramatises the story of the Milperra massacre, when the Bandidos and the Comanchero motorcycle clubs went to war on Father's Day, Sunday 2 September 1984. The massacre had its beginnings after a group of Comancheros broke away and formed the first Bandidos Motorcycle Club chapter in Australia. This resulted in intense rivalry between the two chapters. At a public swap meet at the Viking Tavern at Milperra, New South Wales, a brief but violent battle ensued with seven people shot dead, including a 14-year-old innocent female bystander. A further 28 people were wounded with 20 requiring hospitalisation.

Each episode starts with a quote stated by Justice Adrian Roden when the clubs went before the New South Wales Supreme Court; "As patriotism can lead to jingoism and mateship can lead to cronyism, so bikie club loyalty can lead to bikie club war."

== Cast ==
=== Bandidos ===
- Callan Mulvey as Snoddy
- Maeve Dermody as Lee (Snoddy's girlfriend)
- Damian Walshe-Howling as Chopper (Vice President of the Bandidos)
- Anthony Hayes as Colin "Caesar" Campbell (Sgt-at-Arms of the Bandidos)
- Luke Hemsworth as Shadow
- Fletcher Humphrys as Bull
- Sam Parsonson as Junior
- Aaron Fa'aoso as Roo
- Richard Sutherland as Davo
- Peter Flaherty as Lard

=== Comancheros ===
- Matt Nable as Jock Ross (President and self-proclaimed 'Supreme Commander' of the Comancheros)
- Susie Porter as Vanessa (Jock's wife)
- Richard Cawthorne as Foggy (Vice President of the Comancheros)
- Jeremy Lindsay Taylor as Leroy (Sgt-at-Arms of the Comancheros)
- Luke Ford as Snow
- Nathaniel Dean as Kraut
- Todd Lasance as Kiddo
- Manu Bennett as Sunshine
- Trent Baines as Sparra
- Pier Carthew as Dog

== Episodes ==
No.	Title	Directed by	Written by	Original release date	Aus. viewers (millions)
1	"Episode 1"	Peter Andrikidis	Greg Haddrick	15 May 2012	1.261
Alone and adrift after his discharge from the Navy, Anthony Spencer discovers the seductive world of the outlaw bikie and the formidable force that is William "Jock" Ross – the Supreme Commander of the Comancheros.
2	"Episode 2"	Peter Andrikidis	Jo Martino	22 May 2012	0.905
Now a fully-fledged member of the Comancheros, Anthony "Snoddy" Spencer does his best to calm bristling egos when Mario "Chopper" Cianter, Colin "Caesar" Campbell and his brothers Gregory ("Shadow") and Phillip ("Bull") threaten to become a club within a club to the displeasure of Ross.
3	"Episode 3"	Peter Andrikidis	Jo Martino	29 May 2012	0.959
After splitting the Comancheros into two chapters, tensions with Jock's western chapter make a mockery of club loyalty. Snoddy and the city chapter reject their Comanchero colours and join the Bandidos, forming the first ever Bandido chapter in Australia.
4	"Episode 4"	Peter Andrikidis	Roger Simpson	5 June 2012	0.928
Hostilities between the two clubs intensify with Jock declaring war on the Bandidos, leading to the Bandidos to retaliate.
5	"Episode 5"	Peter Andrikidis	Roger Simpson	12 June 2012	1.029
A young girl, Leanne, encourages Shifty, the Sergeant at Arms for the Rebels and a friend of her sister's, to take her to the swap meet at the Viking Tavern in Milperra. It is going to be a great day. Though neither of the two warring clubs expect more than a show of force at such a public event, motives are misunderstood when a number of Bandidos ride by Kiddo's house. As the girlfriends and wives of the bikers prepare family barbeques, the two clubs assemble at their respective clubhouses. The Comancheros are the first to arrive at Milperra and think the Bandidos are a no-show. Then the Bandidos suddenly arrive in force, catching the Comancheros unprepared and clearly outnumbered.
6	"Episode 6"	Peter Andrikidis	Roger Simpson	19 June 2012	1.026
The confrontation at Milperra leaves six bikers and one innocent bystander dead ("Chopper" & "Shadow" of the Bandidos. "Foggy", "Leroy", "Sparra" & "Dog" of the Comanchero and 14-year-old girl Leanne Walters). Many of the members from both clubs are imprisoned as they await trial. The stresses and guilt are too much to bear for Snoddy who relinquishes his Presidency to "Bull" Campbell before hanging himself in his jail cell. 57 Bandidos & Comancheros are handed lengthy sentences for various convictions. Due to serious misdirections to the jury by trial judge Justice Roden, the Court of Appeal quashed the murder convictions and the majority of bikers were released immediately. Jock served a total of five years and three months for his part in the massacre. His time served was the most of anyone involved.

== Reception ==
=== Ratings ===
The premiere episode won its timeslot with 1.26 million viewers based on the overnight numbers, peaking at 1.43 million viewers.

No.	Title	Air date	Timeslot	Overnight ratings		Ref(s)
No.	Title	Air date	Timeslot	Viewers	Rank	Ref(s)
1	Episode 1	15 May 2012	Tuesday 8:30 pm	1,261,000	3	
2	Episode 2	22 May 2012	Tuesday 8:30 pm	905,000	14	
3	Episode 3	29 May 2012	Tuesday 8:30 pm	959,000	11	
4	Episode 4	5 June 2012	Tuesday 8:30 pm	928,000	13	
5	Episode 5	12 June 2012	Tuesday 8:30 pm	1,029,000	10	
6	Episode 6	19 June 2012	Tuesday 8:30 pm	1,026,000	9	

=== Reviews ===
The New Zealand critic Craig Nicholson praised Brothers In Arms as a "chilling" mini-series that was similar to the Underbelly series. Nicholosn wrote: "Like Underbelly, Bikie Wars is the almost unbelievable story of a "war" that really happened." The Australian critic Steve Molk praised the acting, music and realism of the mini-series. Molk wrote: "Incredible performances from Mulvey and Nable led a very strong male-heavy cast that, despite bikies often being portrayed as one-dimensional thugs, delivered layered characters and intense performances...Special mentions to Susie Porter as Jock’s wife Vanessa and Maeve Dermody as Snoddy’s girl Lee – two very determined and strong women of their own right." Molk felt that: "One of the few negatives about the series was after building so much tension across five and a half hours of story the last have of the final episode seemed to drag and was far too procedural, though it was a necessary post script to a spectacular showdown that was the basis for the story."

== Music "Highway Mind" ==
Australian musician Diesel recorded and released the track "Highway Mind" for the soundtrack. It was released as a single on 16 May 2012.

== Home media ==
Bikie Wars: Brothers In Arms was Released on DVD & Blu-Ray In June 2012. As of March 2022 it has been out of print for sometime.

DVD name	Format	Ep #	Discs	Region 4 (Australia)	Special features	Distributors
Bikie Wars: Brothers In Arms	DVD	6	2	21 June 2012	The making of Bikie Wars: Brothers in Arms Behind the scenes: Hair & Make-Up Armoury Capturing the moment Design Bikes Wardrobe Extended Trailer	Roadshow Entertainment
