= Callan Mulvey =

Australian - New Zealand actor

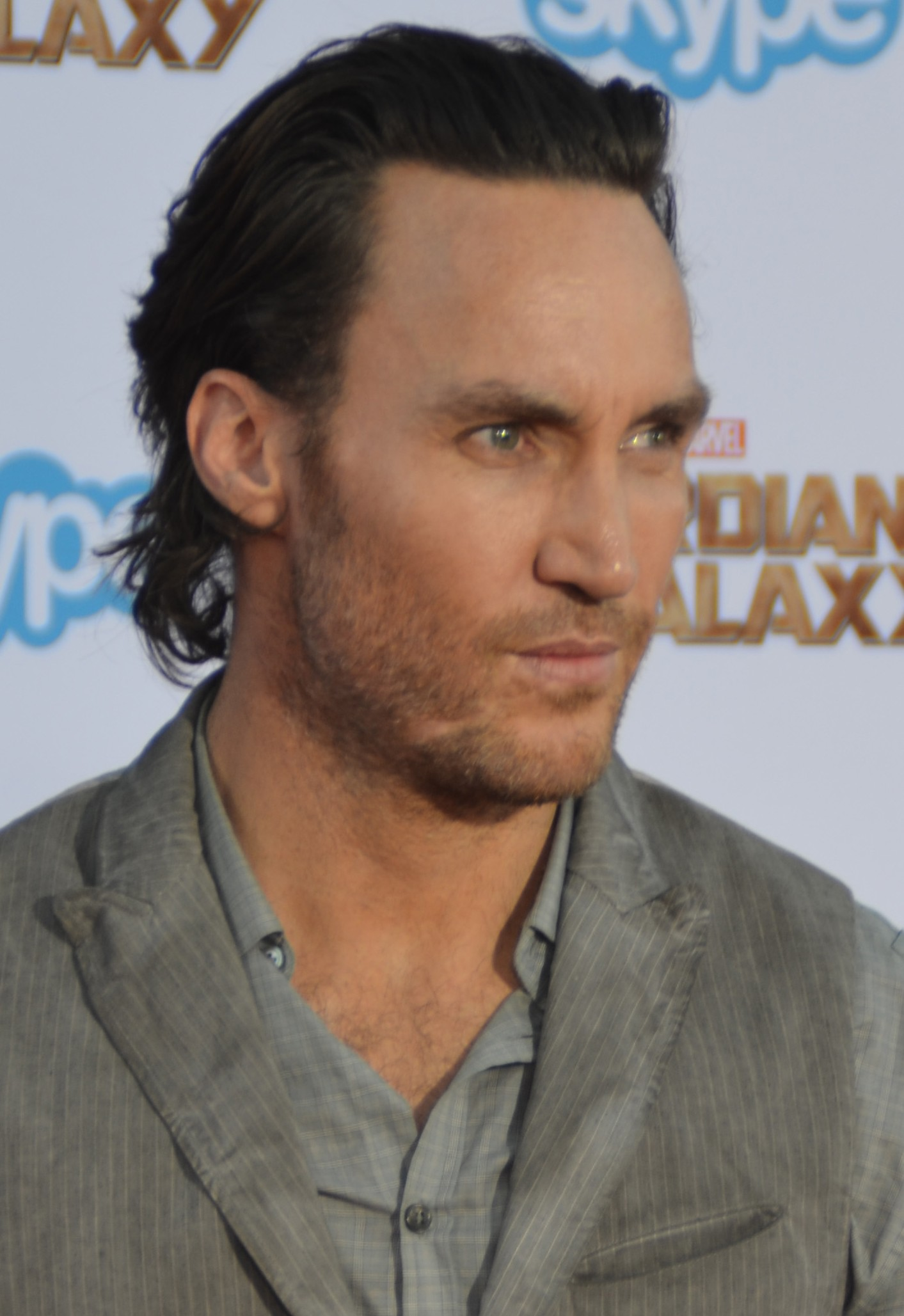
- Mulvey at the Guardians of the Galaxy premiere in July 2014
- Born: Callan Francis Mulvey; 24 February 1975 (age 51); Auckland, New Zealand
- Occupation: Actor
- Years active: 1997–present

Callan Mulvey (born 23 February 1975) is an Australian actor. He gained widespread recognition for his performances as Mark Moran on the Australian drama Underbelly, Sergeant Brendan 'Josh' Joshua in Rush, and as Bogdan Drazic in the popular series Heartbreak High. In the United States, Mulvey has appeared in notable films such as 300: Rise of an Empire, Jack Rollins in Captain America: The Winter Soldier (2014) and Avengers: Endgame (2019), Anatoli Knyazev in Batman v Superman: Dawn of Justice (2016), and Dean/Milan in Power (2016).

== Early life ==
Of Scottish, Irish and Māori descent, Mulvey was born in Auckland, New Zealand, and moved to Australia when he was eight years old, growing up in the northern beaches of Sydney.

== Career ==
Mulvey's personal interest in skateboarding and rollerblading led him to work as a stunt double about two years prior to winning the role of Drazic in Heartbreak High. His first role was of a victim of a robbery in a police training video.

In 2003, Mulvey began filming Thunderstruck. On Dec. 31, 2003, after shooting wrapped, he was involved in a car accident, sustaining serious injuries that required months of rehabilitation. In May 2004, he re-entered the spotlight for the release of Thunderstruck.

Mulvey had guest spots on Home and Away (as Johnny Cooper) during 2006 to 2008 and McLeod's Daughters during 2007.

He starred in the 2008 Australian underworld crime show Underbelly as Mark Moran, and appeared in police series Rush as Sgt. Brendan "Josh" Joshua.

In 2012, he starred in the underworld crime miniseries Bikie Wars: Brothers in Arms as Mark Anthony "Snoddy" Spencer.

In 2012, he appeared in Kathryn Bigelow's Zero Dark Thirty as Saber. The following year, he starred in The Turning, directed by Robert Connelly.

In 2014, he appeared in 300: Rise of an Empire as Syllias, as Jack Rollins in Captain America: The Winter Soldier, as Skylar in the Katie Holmes black comedy Miss Meadows, and as Jack Taylor in Kill Me Three Times.

Mulvey played Anatoli Knyazev in Batman v Superman: Dawn of Justice (2016). In the film, Knyazev does not appear as KGBeast and is only a hired gun.

In 2016, he appeared briefly in Warcraft, the film adaptation of the video game Warcraft, in which he was credited as Warrior, as well as joining the main cast of Starz TV's Power, for season three, as Dean/Milan.

Mulvey has since starred in a number of other films, including Beyond Skyline, the sequel to the cult-classic Skyline, and Bleeding Steel, a science fiction thriller starring Jackie Chan, both in 2017, and the horror film Delirium, the historical drama Outlaw King, In Like Flynn, a biopic of Errol Flynn's early years, and Desolate, a drama based on a family of farmers living in a dystopian future, the lattermost four all in 2018.

== Personal life ==
Mulvey was injured in a serious car accident in 2003, in a head-on collision at 100 km/h (62 mph). He was trapped in the vehicle for almost an hour until he could be freed from the wreckage. The midsection of his face completely collapsed, an incision was made from ear to ear over the top of his scalp, his face "pulled down" and 17 titanium plates were then inserted to repair the fractures to his face and jaw. His left knee and ankle were also badly fractured. Mulvey also permanently lost his vision in his left eye.

== Filmography ==
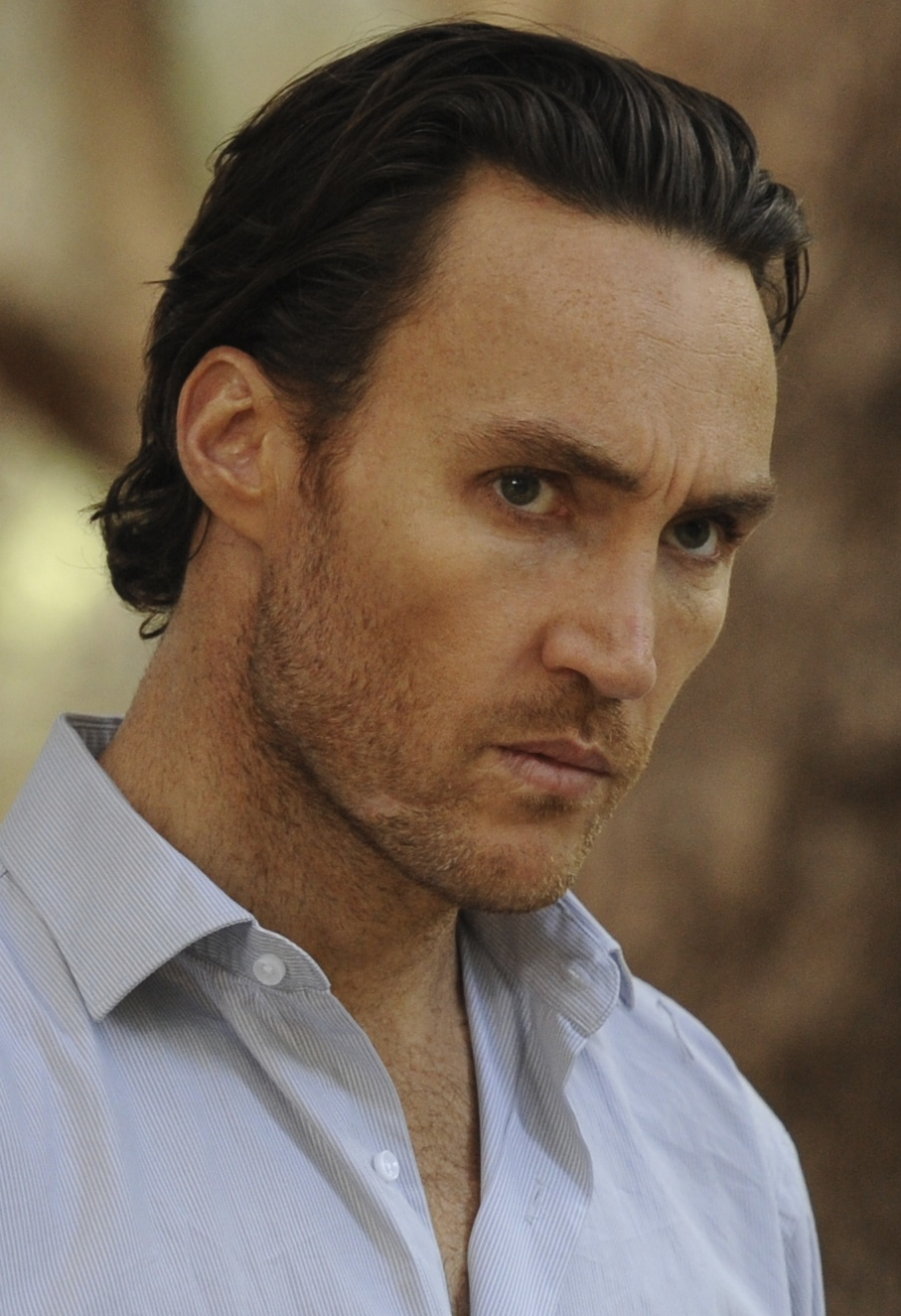
Mulvey while filming for The Turning, 2013

=== Films ===
Year	Title	Role	Notes
2004	Thunderstruck	Sam	
2008	Glass	John	Short film
2011	The Hunter	Rival Hunter	
2012	Zero Dark Thirty	Saber - DEVGRU	
2013	The Turning	David Wilson	Segment: "Aquifer"
2014	300: Rise of an Empire	Scyllias	
2014	Captain America: The Winter Soldier	Jack Rollins	
2014	Miss Meadows	Skylar	
2014	Kill Me Three Times	Jack Taylor	
2016	Batman v Superman: Dawn of Justice	Anatoli Knyazev	
2016	Warcraft	Warrior	
2017	Beyond Skyline	Harper	
2017	Bleeding Steel	Andre	
2018	Delirium	Alex	
2018	Outlaw King	John III Comyn, Lord of Badenoch	
2018	In Like Flynn	Johnson	
2018	Desolate	Van	
2019	Avengers: Endgame	Jack Rollins	
2019	Ford v Ferrari	-	stunts
2020	The F**k-It List	Dee	
2020	Shadow in the Cloud	John Reeves	
2020	Children of the Corn	Robert Williams	
2020	High Ground	Eddy	
2020	Breach	Teek	
2021	Till Death	Bobby Ray	
2022	The Gray Man	"Sierra Four"	
2025	Valiant One	Chris Lebold	
2025	Forgive Us All	Logan	Also executive producer
2025	The Run	Mac	

=== Television ===
Year	Title	Role	Notes
1997–1999	Heartbreak High	Bogdan Drazic	112 episodes
1999	All Saints	Stewie Holder	1 episode
2000	Pizza	Dave/Middle-class Homeboy	2 episodes
2001	The Finder	Sam Natoli	TV movie
2001	Head Start	Rodney 'Rod' Hunter	5 episodes
2001	BeastMaster	Rikko	1 episode
2001	Code Red	Cage Sorrentino	TV movie
2006–2008	Home and Away	Johnny Cooper	33 episodes
2007	Sea Patrol	Horst Wenders	1 episode
2007	McLeod's Daughters	Mitch Wahlberg	3 episodes
2008	Underbelly	Mark Moran	5 episodes
2008–2011	Rush	Brendan 'Josh' Joshua	70 episodes
2011	SLiDE	Bailey	1 episode
2012	Bikie Wars: Brothers in Arms	Anthony 'Snoddy' Spencer	6 episodes
2016	Power	Dean/Milan	10 episodes
2019	Too Old to Die Young	Keith Redford	1 episodes
2020	The Luminaries	George Shepard	6 episodes
2020	Mystery Road	Simon	6 episodes
2021–2022	Firebite	Vampire King	1 episodes
2023	Last King of the Cross	Det. Sgt Brian Crellan	10 episodes
2025	Apple Cider Vinegar	Dr Phil	1 episodes
