= Nathaniel Dean =

Australian actor (born 1975)

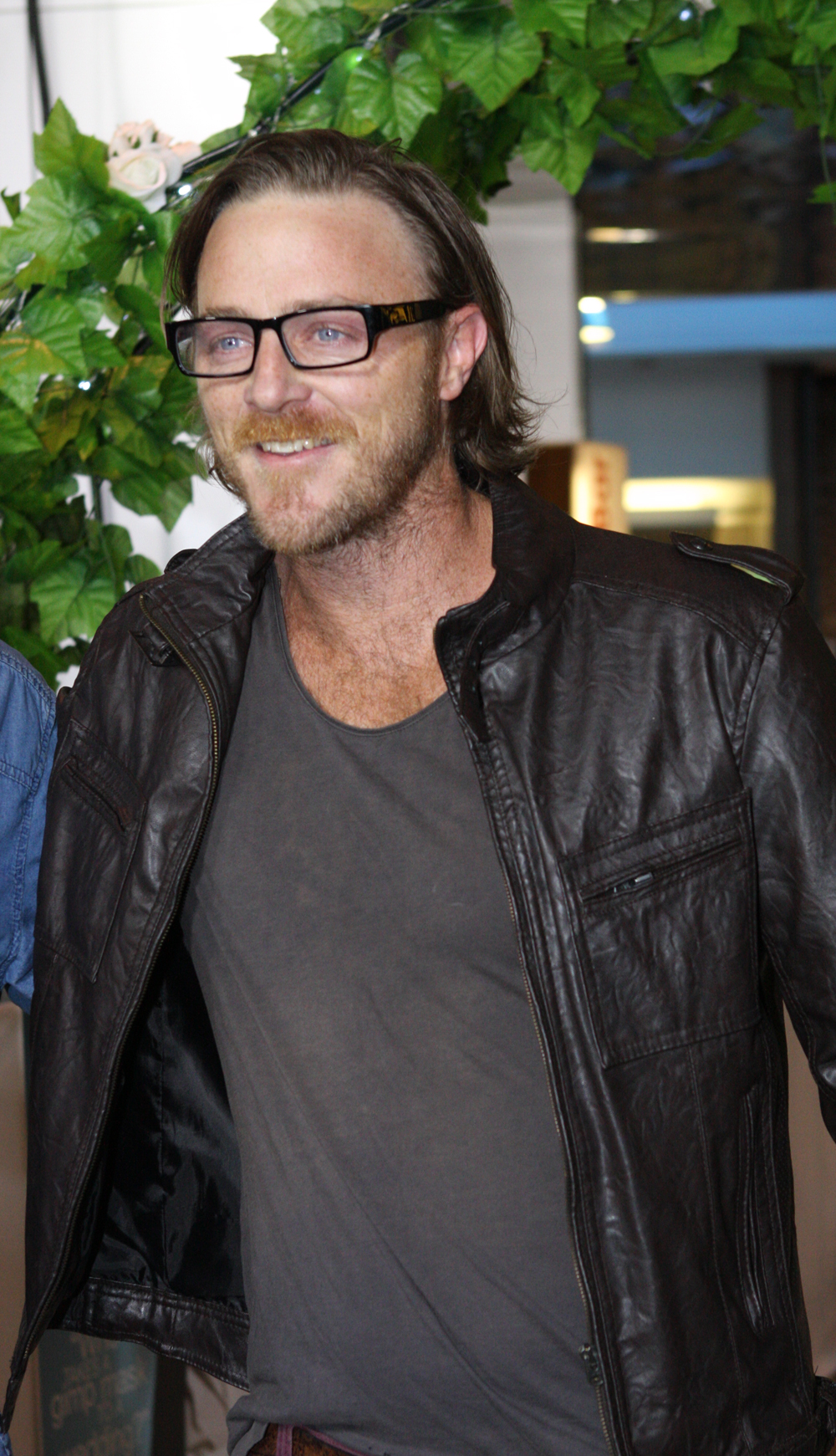
- Born: Nathaniel Dean; 24 January 1975 (age 51); Australia
- Education: National Institute of Dramatic Art
- Occupations: Actor and voice artist
- Years active: 2000–present

Nathaniel Dean (born 24 January 1975) is an Australian actor and voiceover artist. His most recent performances include Sergeant Hallett in Ridley Scott's Alien: Covenant (2017), as well as colonial Australian settler William Thornhill in The Secret River for the Sydney Theatre Company.

In 2002, he won an AACTA Award for Best Supporting Actor for his role in Tony Ayres' acclaimed Walking on Water.

Dean has performed in numerous stage plays, TV series, short films and Australian feature films. He has been the voice of numerous advertising campaigns and productions including Recipe to Riches, the AFL, Victoria Bitter and Holden.

== Early life ==
Dean grew up in the Yarra Valley region of Victoria, Australia. During his final year of high school, he resuscitated a woman at his local swimming pool. This event would later become the subject of Dean's first dramatic work.

After performing in numerous productions in Melbourne's independent theatre scene, Dean auditioned for the National Institute of Dramatic Art (NIDA). He was accepted with a scholarship.

== Career ==
After graduation, Dean and NIDA classmate Toby Schmitz worked together on Howard Korder's Boys Life. The production was selected to open the Sydney Fringe Festival. The pair appeared together soon after in Schmitz's first play, Dream a Little Dream at Belvoir St Theatre.

In 2002, Dean played Patch in the TV series Always Greener, which was nominated for an International Emmy Award. That same year, he received an AFI Award for Best Supporting Actor for his role in Tony Ayres' film Walking on Water. In 2004, Dean was nominated for the same award for his role in Cate Shortland's Somersault. He also played Jothee in Brian Henson's science fiction film Farscape: The Peacekeeper Wars.

Dean played alongside Heath Ledger in Candy - Neil Armfield's adaptation of Luke Davies' novel of the same name. Armfield would later direct Dean in the plays Peribanez and Tommy Murphy's Gwen in Purgatory at Belvoir St Theatre and later The Secret River at the Sydney Theatre Company.

In 2008, Dean played a Rugby League star in Matt Nable's Australian film, The Final Winter, which told the story of how big business entered the NRL during the 1980s.

That same year, Dean played Fred Klein in Rain Shadow, a desperate and suicidal farmer whose livelihood is threatened by drought. Dean then played a psychotic serial killer addicted to Crystal Methamphetamine on East West 101.

Dean went on to play Sergeant Mick Scanlon in Channel Seven's period drama Wild Boys and Kraut in Channel Ten's Bikie Wars. He also appeared in the AFI winning series Puberty Blues.

More recently, Dean has spent more time on stage, starring in Belvoir St Theatre's production of Gwen in Purgatory, written by Tommy Murphy, and directed by Neil Armfield.

In 2013, he starred as William Thornhill in the Sydney Theatre Company's landmark adaptation of Kate Grenville's book, The Secret River.

Dean plays Tyson Black in the 2019 crime-thriller film Locusts.

Dean plays Nash Mason in Foxtel/Binge crime drama High Country.

== Filmography ==
=== Film ===
Year	Title	Role	Notes
2002	Walking on Water	Simon	
2003	Ned	Klan Policeman	
2003	The Rage in Placid Lake	Lachie	
2004	Somersault	Stuart	
2006	Candy	Paul Hillman	
2007	The Final Winter	Trent	
2017	Alien: Covenant	Hallett	
2018	The Nightingale	Stoakes	
2019	Locusts	Tyson Black	

=== Television ===
Year	Title	Role	Notes
2001	Home and Away	Scott Phillips	3 episodes
2001–2003	Always Greener	Patch	26 episodes
2004	Farscape: The Peacekeeper Wars	Jothee	2 episodes
2005	Heartbreak Tour	Nick	Television film
2005–2006	All Saints	James Byrne / Nathan Giles	6 episodes
2006	HeadLand	Toby Martin	14 episodes
2007	Hammer Bay	Brad Abbot	Television film
2007	Rain Shadow	Fred Klein	6 episodes
2007	East West 101	Warren Johns	Episode: "Hunt for the Killer"
2008	Underbelly	Sidney Martin	Episode: "I Still Pray"
2009	City Homicide	Joel Morrison	Episode: "Mission Statement"
2009–2010	Rush	Andrew Kronin	5 episodes
2010	Satisfaction	Gus	4 episodes
2011	Killing Time	Detective East	Episode #1.6
2011	Wild Boys	Mick Scanlon	10 episodes
2012	Bikie Wars: Brothers in Arms	Kraut	5 episodes
2012	Puberty Blues	Shane	Episode #1.6
2014	Parer's War	George Warfe	Television film
2014	Old School	Jackson	2 episodes
2014	ANZAC Girls	Major Lionel Quick	2 episodes
2019	Secret City	Dunn	3 episodes
2019	Wentworth	Chocco	Episode: "Payback"
2024	Boy Swallows Universe	Raymond Leary	2 episodes
2024	High Country	Nash Mason	4 episodes
