= Adam Nable =

Australian rugby player, actor (born 1975)

Personal information
- Born: 4 September 1975 (age 51) Wodonga, Victoria, Australia

Playing information
- Position: Hooker, Halfback, Lock
Club
Years	Team	Pld	T	G	FG	P
1995	Manly Sea Eagles	1	0	0	0	0
1996	Wakefield Trinity	17	3	0	0	12
1997–99	Balmain Tigers	57	11	0	0	44
2000	Wests Tigers	5	0	0	0	0
2001	North Qld Cowboys	1	0	0	0	0
	Total	81	14	0	0	56
- Source: As of 19 August 2019
- Relatives: Matt Nable (brother)

Adam Nable (born 4 September 1975) is an Australian former professional rugby league footballer who played in the 1990s and 2000s. He played for the Manly-Warringah Sea Eagles, Wakefield Trinity, Balmain Tigers, Wests Tigers and North Queensland Cowboys. He later played for the New York Knights in the American National Rugby League, and was vice-captain there. He is the brother of player-turned-filmmaker Matt Nable.

== Playing career ==
Nable made his first grade debut for Manly-Warringah in Round 22 1995, coming off the bench in a 32-4 victory over South Sydney at Brookvale Oval. This would be Nable's only appearance for Manly. The club would go on to win the minor premiership but were defeated in the grand final by Canterbury-Bankstown.

In 1997, Nable joined Balmain and became a regular in the team over the next 3 seasons. In August 1999, Nable played in the club's final top grade game as a stand-alone entity, a 42-14 loss to the Canberra Raiders at Bruce Stadium.

At the end of 1999, Balmain merged with fellow foundation club Western Suburbs to form the Wests Tigers, with Nable chosen as one of the Balmain players chosen to represent the new side. In February 2020, Nable played in the club's inaugural game which, a 24-24 draw with the Brisbane Broncos at Campbelltown Stadium.

At the end of the 2000 season, Nable was released by Wests and he joined North Queensland for the 2001 season. Nable made one appearance for North Queensland which came against Penrith in Round 4 2001 at Cazaly's Stadium.
