= Sandra Harvey =

Australian investigative journalist and author

- Born: Sandra Dawn Harvey; 19 September 1958
- Died: 21 January 2008 (aged 49); Darlinghurst, New South Wales, Australia
- Occupations: Journalist and author
- Writing career
- Language: English
- Notable awards: 2007 Ned Kelly Awards for Crime Writing – Lifetime Contribution

Sandra Harvey (19 September 1958 – 21 January 2008) was an Australian investigative journalist and true crime writer.

== Career ==
Harvey began her career at Australian Associated Press, where she worked as a police reporter from 1984 to 1989. She was a journalist at the Sydney Morning Herald for eleven years, reporting on crime.

She next worked as press secretary for Paul Whelan during his time as New South Wales Police Minister.

Finally, she worked for ABC's Four Corners, investigating and producing stories such as "Homies" concerning child abuse in homes run by the Salvation Army and "A Deathly Silence" on teenage suicide.

== Books ==
Her first book, published in 1989, co-authored with Lindsay Simpson was Brothers in Arms about the clash between the Comancheros and Bandidos now known as the Milperra massacre. The best-selling book was made into a television mini-series, Bikie Wars: Brothers in Arms produced by Screentime, and screened on Channel 10 in May 2012. The series peaked at 1.26 million viewers.

Her second book, The Killer Next Door, concerned the serial killer John Glover. Again co-authored with Lindsay Simpson, it investigated the life and crimes of the so-called Granny Killer, who was convicted of murdering six women.

In 2000, her third book, The Ghost of Ludwig Gertsch, was published. In it, she explored Gertsch's life and death as a rich homosexual businessman. Her findings were endorsed by police reinvestigation into Gertsch's death and a second coronial inquiry.

Her fourth book, My Husband My Killer, also co-authored with Lindsay Simpson, was an investigation into the murder of Megan Kalajzich. An award-winning telemovie of the same name was produced in 2000 starring Colin Friels, Martin Sacks and David Field.

Her final book, co-authored with Sydney Morning Herald journalist Jennifer Cooke, was Done Like a Dinner. It explored crimes related to restaurants in Sydney and Melbourne.

In 2007, she and Lindsay Simpson jointly won the Lifetime Achievement award presented by the Ned Kelly Awards for Crime Writing.

== Death and legacy ==
Harvey died of cancer on 21 January 2008 aged 49.

The SD Harvey Short Crime Story Award was inaugurated in 2008 in her honour.
