= Matt Nable =

Australian rugby league footballer, film maker & actor

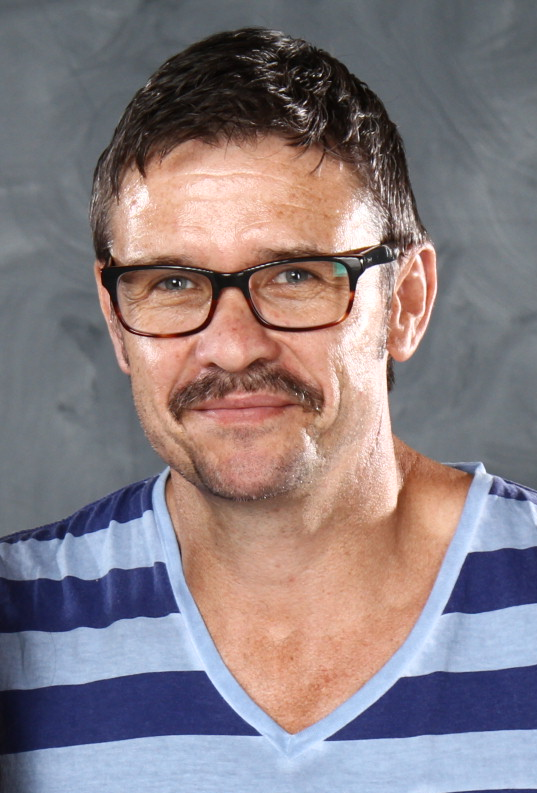
- Nable in 2015

Personal information
- Full name: Matthew Nable
- Born: 8 March 1972 (age 54) Sydney, New South Wales, Australia

Playing information
- Position: Lock, Second-row
Club
Years	Team	Pld	T	G	FG	P
1991–92	Manly Sea Eagles	5	1	0	0	4
1995	South Sydney	3	0	0	0	0
1996	Carlisle	16	4	0	0	16
1997	London Broncos	4	1	0	0	4
	Total	28	6	0	0	24
- Relatives: Adam Nable (brother)

Matthew Nable (born 8 March 1972) is an Australian film and television actor, writer, sports commentator and former professional rugby league footballer. After playing in the Winfield Cup Premiership during the 1990s for the Manly-Warringah and South Sydney clubs, he wrote and starred in the rugby league-centred drama The Final Winter in 2007. Nable went on to act in films such as Killer Elite and Riddick. He appeared on Mr Inbetween and as Ra's al Ghul in The CW's Arrow and Legends of Tomorrow.

== Early life ==
Nable was born to David Nable and Kristine Jeffrey. Nable grew up on the Northern Beaches of Sydney and also, as a young boy, spent two years at Portsea, Victoria, when his father, Dave, a soldier, was stationed there, and another period of his childhood in Albury. His father had also worked as a trainer for the Australian national rugby league team, and his brother, Adam Nable, would become a professional player as well.

== Rugby league career ==
Nable rose through the junior ranks at the Manly-Warringah club and made five appearances for the Graham Lowe-coached team over 1991 and 1992. Following this he didn't appear in the premiership until 1995 when he played three games for the South Sydney Rabbitohs.

After another season in England where he played for Carlisle before moving to the London Broncos, Nable quit football and then tried his hand at boxing, fighting for the state light-heavyweight title as an amateur. He then worked as a beer salesman and personal trainer, but eventually decided to leave paid employment to become a writer.

== Writing and acting career ==
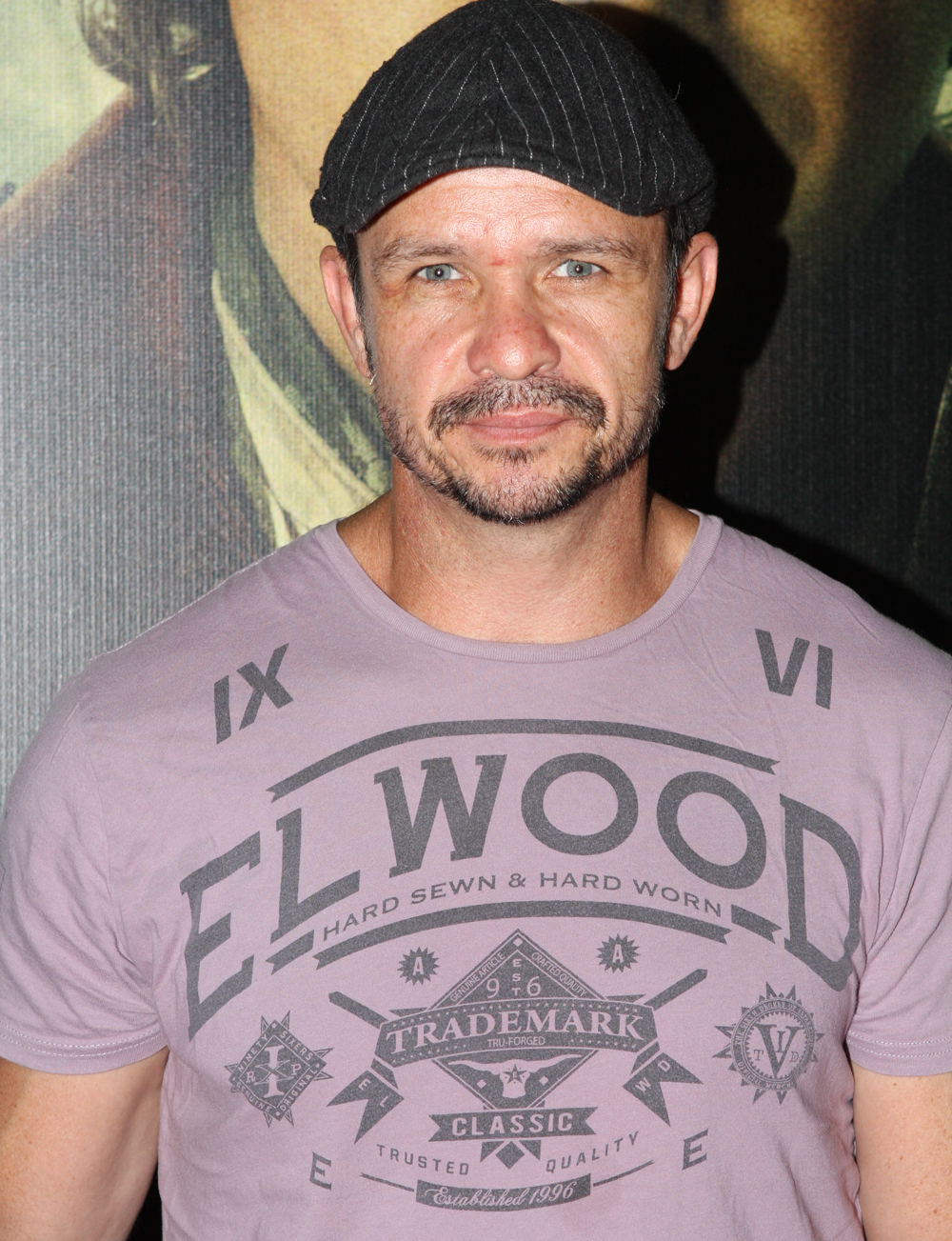
Nable in 2012

After encouragement from his mentor, Booker Prize-winning novelist Thomas Keneally, Nable wrote a screenplay for The Final Winter based on his unpublished novel of the same name. With friends he also managed to raise $1.6m and they worked together to make the film which was released in 2007, and earned critical praise but was a box office failure.

Nable went on to act in the United States as a Los Angeles detective in the 2008 television movie S.I.S..

In 2009, his book We Don't Live Here Anymore was published, in 2011 he published his second book Faces in the Clouds, which won critical praise.

He worked as a writer on Channel 7's rugby league comedy programme, The Matty Johns Show.

Nable appeared in the main cast of critically acclaimed and award-winning SBS drama series, East West 101, and in the 2011 action film Killer Elite alongside Clive Owen, Robert De Niro, Yvonne Strahovski, Jason Statham, and Dominic Purcell.

Nable starred in the 2012 Australian drama series, Bikie Wars: Brothers in Arms. The same year he was announced as a cast member of another Australian TV series, Underbelly: Badness. He also had a role in the film 33 Postcards.

He appeared in the 2013 sci-fi film Riddick alongside Vin Diesel.

In March 2014, it was reported that Nable would appear in the Nine Network's upcoming miniseries Gallipoli.

On 4 September 2014, Stephen Amell announced on Facebook that Nable would portray the role of Ra's al Ghul on the third season of Arrow. Despite Liam Neeson (Ra's al Ghul in The Dark Knight Trilogy) expressing an interest in reprising his role for the television series' third season and the CW Network reaching out to him, he was unavailable and Nable was cast as Ra's instead. IGN's Jesse Scheeden said he brought "charisma and danger to the part". Nable portrayed the character in ten episodes of the third season. He reprised his role in a first season episode of Legends of Tomorrow.

In October 2019, Nable starred in the opening cinematic of the 2019 Bathurst 1000, broadcast on Fox Sports Australia. Nable has since featured in numerous Fox Sports cinematics, promotions and advertisements, primarily for their Rugby League division, Fox League.

From 2018 to 2021 he had a recurring role in the Australian black-comedy crime drama Mr Inbetween.

On 19 November 2024, Nable was named as part of an extended cast for Netflix series Apple Cider Vinegar.

== Filmography ==
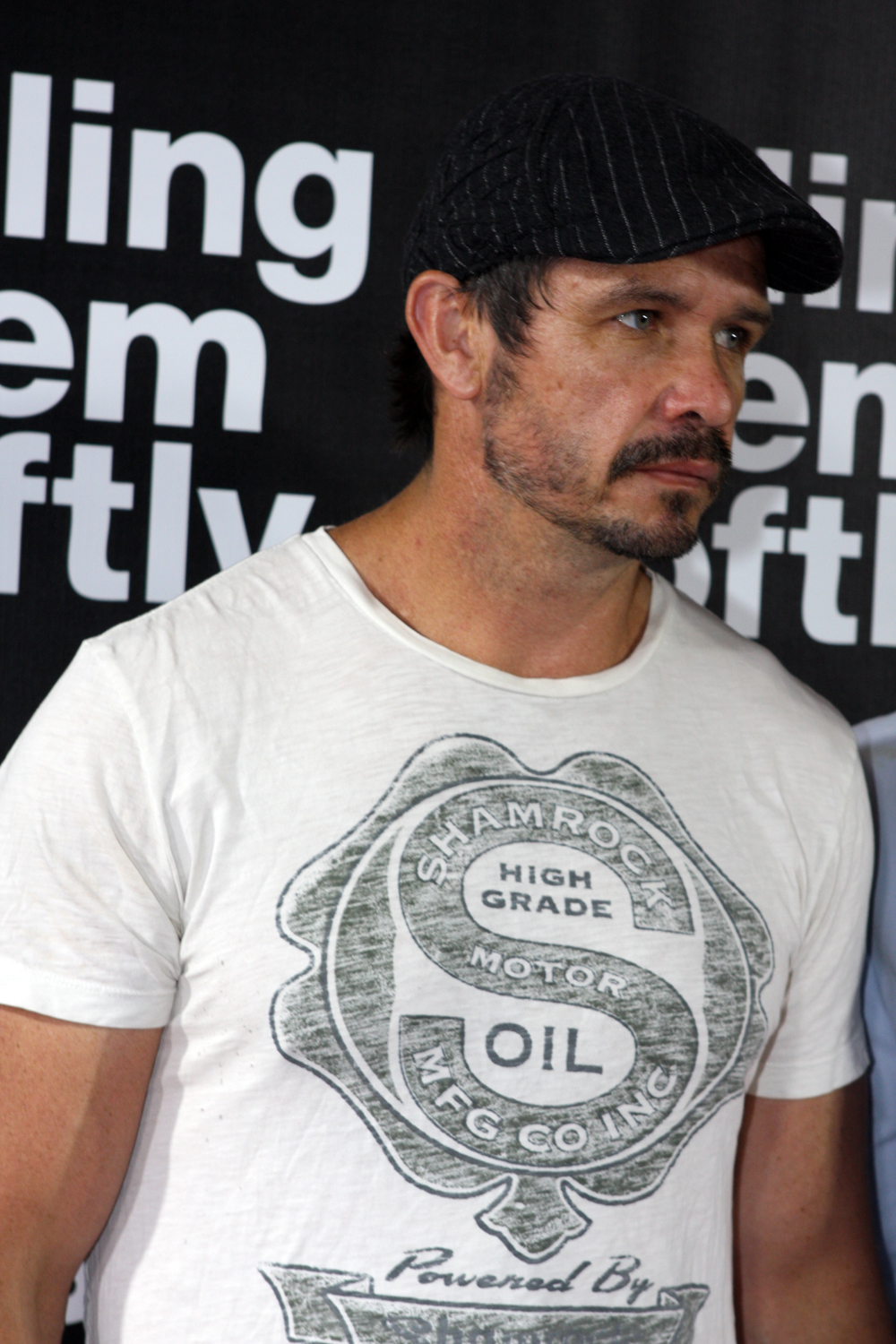
Nable at the Killing Them Softly Australian premiere

=== Film ===
Year	Title	Role	Notes
2007	The Final Winter	Mick 'Grub' Henderson	Also writer
2011	33 Postcards	Tommy	As Matthew Nable
2011	Killer Elite	Pennock	
2012	K-11	Villalobos	As Matthew Nable
2013	Around the Block	Jack Wood	
2013	The Turning	Max	
2013	Riddick	Colonel R. 'Boss' Johns	
2014	Fell	Thomas	
2014	Son of a Gun	Sterlo	
2016	Hacksaw Ridge	Lieutenant Colonel Cooney	
2016	Incarnate	Dan Sparrow	
2017	Jasper Jones	Sergeant	
2017	1%	President Knuck	Also writer
2019	Standing Up for Sunny	Male Interviewer	
2021	The Dry	Grant Dow	
2022	Poker Face	Billy	
2023	Transfusion	Johnny	Also writer and director
2025	Wolfram	Billy	
2026	Thrash	Billy	
TBA†	In Cold Light	The Inspector	Post-production
TBA†	That's Not a Knife	Himself	Documentary; post-production

Key
†	Denotes films that have not yet been released

=== Television ===
Year	Title	Role	Notes
2008	S.I.S.	Melville Atkinson	Television film
2011	East West 101	Detective Neil Travis	Main cast (season 3) (credited as Matthew Nable)
2012	Bikie Wars: Brothers in Arms	William George "Jock" Ross	Main cast
2012	Underbelly: Badness	Detective Sergeant Gary Jubelin	Main cast (credited as Matthew Nable)
2014–2015	Arrow	Ra's al Ghul	Recurring role (season 3)
2015	Winter	Federal Agent Jake Harris	Main cast
2015	Gallipoli	Sergeant Harry Perceval	Miniseries
2016	Legends of Tomorrow	Ra's al Ghul	Episode: "Left Behind"
2016	Barracuda	Frank Torma	Miniseries
2016	Quarry	Thurston	2 episodes
2016	Hyde & Seek	Detective Sergeant Gary Hyde	Main cast
2017	Blue Murder: Killer Cop	Detective Mark Standen	Miniseries
2018	Dead Lucky	Matt O'Reilly	Miniseries
2018–2021	Mr Inbetween	Dave	Recurring role
2020	The Sounds	Jack McGregor	Main cast
2022	The Twelve	Nathan Spears	Main cast
2023	Last King of the Cross	"Big Tony" Stone	Main cast
2023	Year Of	Alan Prichard	10 episodes
2023–present	Bay of Fires	Thaddeus	TV series
2024	Plum	Dave	5 episodes
2025	Apple Cider Vinegar	Joe	6 episodes

== Awards and nominations ==
Year	Title	Award	Category	Result	Ref
2025	Apple Cider Vinegar	Logie Awards	Best Supporting Actor	Pending	
2022	Mr Inbetween	Logie Awards	Most Outstanding Supporting Actor	Nominated	
2021	Mr Inbetween	AACTA Awards	Best Supporting Actor Drama	Nominated	
2017	Blue Murder: Killer Cop	AACTA Awards	Guest or Supporting Actor in Television Drama	Nominated	

== Bibliography ==
=== Books ===
- We Don't Live Here Anymore (2009)
- Faces in the Clouds (2011)
- Guilt (2015)
- Still (2021)
- Mire (2026)
