= Lindsay Simpson =

Australian journalist

- Born: Lindsay Jane Simpson; 1957 (age 68–69); Scotland
- Occupations: Journalist and author
- Writing career
- Language: English
- Years active: 1986-
- Notable awards: 2007 Ned Kelly Awards for Crime Writing — Lifetime Contribution

Lindsay Jane Simpson (born 1957) is an Australian journalist, university teacher and a writer of true crime.

== Career ==
Born in Scotland in 1957, Simpson arrived in Australia in 1974. Simpson worked as an investigative journalist for The Sydney Morning Herald for twelve years.

She has authored and co-authored seven books. Her first book, published in 1989, co-authored with Sandra Harvey was Brothers in Arms about the Milperra massacre. The best-selling book was made into a television mini-series, Bikie Wars: Brothers in Arms produced by Screentime, and screened on Channel 10 in May 2012. The series peaked at 1.43 million viewers and is available on DVD.

Her first novel, The Curer of Souls was published in 2006 by Random House. One of her crime books, My Husband My Killer, co-authored with Sandra Harvey was made into a telemovie starring Colin Friels (2000). Her third crime book, co-written with Harvey is about the serial killer John Wayne Glover.

Her next book was Honeymoon Dive, co-authored with Jennifer Cooke, and published by Pan MacMillan in September 2010 about the scuba diving death of Tina Watson on the Great Barrier Reef. It was later updated by the authors after Watson's husband Gabe was acquitted in February 2012. She also wrote is Where is Daniel with Bruce and Denise Morcombe which was released in August 2014 and concerns the abduction and murder of their son, Daniel.

Her latest book is Adani: Following its Dirty Footsteps about the environmental battle to stop the building of Australia's largest coal mine. While working on the book about climate change, Simpson travelled to India to visit Adani's coal-fired powerplant in Mundra and door-knocked at Adani's HQ in Ahmedabad.

Simpson was Co-ordinator and founder of the Master of Arts (Writing) and the Bachelor of Multimedia Journalism at James Cook University and member of the Journalism & Media Studies program and postgraduate writing program at University of Tasmania. She is now working as a full-time writer.

== Awards ==
- 2007 Ned Kelly Awards Lifetime Achievement Award (joint winner with Sandra Harvey)
- 2007 Colin Roderick Awards, shortlisted for The Curer of Souls
- 2019 The Courier-Mail People's Choice Queensland Book of the Year Award winner for Adani, Following Its Dirty Footsteps: A Personal Story

== Bibliography ==
=== Fiction ===
- The Curer of Souls (Random House, 2006)

=== Non-fiction ===
- Brothers in Arms co-written with Sandra Harvey (Allen & Unwin, 1986, 2006) - TV mini-series Bikie Wars: Brothers in Arms 2012 Screentime
- My husband my killer : the murder of Megan Kalajzich co-written with Sandra Harvey (Allen & Unwin, 1992) - telemovie My Husband, My Killer 2000 Screentime
- The Killer Next Door co-written with Sandra Harvey (Random House, 1994)
- The Australian Geographic Guide to Tasmania (Australian Geographic, 1997)
- To Have & To Hold co-written with Walter Mikac (Pan MacMillan, 1997)
- Honeymoon Dive co-written with Jennifer Cooke (Pan MacMillan, 2010)
- Fatal Honeymoon Dive co-written with Jennifer Cooke (ebook)
- "Where is Daniel?" with Bruce Morcombe and Denise Morcombe (Pan MacMillan, 2014)
- Adani : Following Its Dirty Footsteps (Spinifex Press, 2018)
