= List of Archibald Prize 2025 finalists =

This is a list of finalists for the 2025 Archibald Prize for portraiture (listed as Artist – Title). Of the 903 entries received for the Archibald Prize, 57 artworks were selected as finalists. As the images are copyrighted, a link to each image is available through the reference.

- Abdul Abdullah – No mountain high enough (Winner: Packing Room Prize 2025)
- Clara Adolphs – Adrian Jangala Robertson (paintbrush and hat)
- Jessica Ashton – Katie Noonan
- Mostafa Azimitabar – The definition of hope
- Billy Bain – Rona and Pig at Palm Valley
- Natasha Bieniek – Cressida Campbell
- Angela Brennan – Bridget in my painting
- Yuriyal Bridgeman – Sana Balai, curator, visits Yuriyal’s studio
- Mitch Cairns – Stephen Ralph
- Matthew Calandra – His face like my face – self-portrait as Robert Englund playing Freddy Krueger
- Peter Ke Heng Chen – I'm a little fish in New York (ripples of ambition)
- Rachel Coad – Home
- Yvette Coppersmith – Self-portrait with two cats
- Luke Cornish, Christophe Domergue – Blood, sweat and tears
- Jonthan Dalton – Natasha in the other room
- Whitney Duan – Banquet (Rainbow Chan)
- Jeremy Eden – Felix Eden
- Remy Faint – Ramesh (with mask)
- David Fairbairn – Head of BF no 2
- Timothy Ferguson – Keiran
- Robert Fielding – Malatja malatja (into the future)
- Julia Fragar – Flagship Mother Multiverse (Justene) (Winner: Archibald Prize 2025)
- Linda Gold – Still standing and fighting
- Jaq Grantford – Sisters
- Yolanda Gray – I won't wish, I will
- Tsering Hannaford – Meditation on time (a left-handed self-portrait)
- JESWRI – Nooky, The Voice
- Brittany Jones – New Madonna
- Solomon Kammer – Kim
- Madeleine Kelly – Diana through threads
- Daniel Kim – Thom Roberts
- Bronte Leighton-Dore – Monica in her studio
- Robert Lewer – You are only as good as your last painting
- Fiona Lowry – Ken Done
- Col Mac – Miranda and Prince
- Catherine McGuiness – Shan is a little little little mermaid
- Kerry McInnis – Savanhdary
- Kelly Maree – Jackie O
- Vincent Namatjira – King Dingo
- Chris O'Doherty (aka Reg Mombassa) – Self-portrait with nose tube
- Sassy Park – Casey
- Sid Pattni – Self-portrait (the act of putting it back together)
- Meagan Pelham – Magic Nikki and Charlie Fancy Pants Party … DJaaaaaaaay
- Jason Phu – older hugo from the future fighting hugo from right now in a swamp and all the frogs and insects and fish and flowers now look on
- Adrian Jangala Robertson – Warwick Thornton
- Joan Ross – Kidjerikidjeri
- Sally Ryan – Lette loose
- Evan Shipard – The green man
- Loribelle Spirovski – Finger painting of William Barton (Winner: People's Choice Award 2025)
- Vipoo Srivilasa – Self-portrait as a cat king
- Clare Thackway – With the shadow
- Natasha Walsh – The Yellow Odalisque of Brunswick
- Peter Wegner – Portrait of Sue Chrysanthou
- Kaylene Whiskey – From comic to canvas
- Marcus Wills – Cormac in Arcadia
- Callum Worsfold – Self-portrait in the studio
- Caroline Zilinsky – A lucid heart – the golden age of Jacob Elordi
