= Christopher Stollery =

Australian actor, filmmaker, and playwright

- Other name: Chris Stollery
- Occupations: Actor, filmmaker, playwright
- Years active: 1984-present

Christopher Stollery is an Australian actor of stage and screen, filmmaker, and playwright. He is known for his roles in the 1990s TV series State Coroner and The Flying Doctors, and more recently as Inspector Dick Kemp in the drama series Last King of the Cross. He also has many stage credits, having had a 15-year association with the Bell Shakespeare Company in Sydney, and has made several short films.

== Early life and education ==
Christopher Stollery graduated from the National Institute of Dramatic Art (NIDA) in Sydney in 1987, and he is also a graduate of AFTRS.

== Acting career ==
=== Screen ===
On television, Stollery is known for his role on State Coroner (1997–98) as Sgt. Dermot McLeod. He had a leading role on The Flying Doctors in 1990, and a recurring role on Sea Patrol in 2007. He also had roles in the TV series A Country Practice, All Saints, White Collar Blue, and Water Rats.

In 2023–24, he played Inspector Dick Kemp in the drama series Last King of the Cross, based on the real-life story of Sydney nightclub mogul John Ibrahim.

His film credits include The Rage in Placid Lake (2003), Predestination (2014), and The Nightingale (2018).

=== Stage ===
Stollery has also a lengthy stage career. He was an associate artist with Bell Shakespeare Company for 15 years, appearing in 19 Bell productions. He played Hamlet in a 1993 production of Hamlet; and Tybalt in Romeo and Juliet in May 1993, of which The Sunday Age's Ken Healy wrote "...most outstanding are Christopher Stollery as the swaggering Capulet thug, Tybalt". In 1994, he played Macduff in Macbeth, of which Leonard Radic of The Age wrote "Christopher Stollery produces plenty of sound and fury, but little else, as Macduff".

He has also performed regularly with the Sydney Theatre Company and Belvoir Street. In 2022, he performed in Wayside Bride and Caryl Churchill's play Light Shining in Buckinghamshire with Belvoir Street.

Stollery has also performed on stage with Cate Blanchett and John Cleese, and sung in a musical with Tim Minchin.

== Creative career ==
=== Filmmaking ===
In 1997 Stollery created the short film Prick, which played at Tropfest and made the Flickerfest finals.

In 2011 he created another short film, Dik, which won Best Screenplay at 2011's Flickerfest and the best comedy award at Aspen Shortsfest. Dik was selected as one of 10 finalists' in the 13th Annual Manhattan Short Film Festival (Manhattan Short) and represented Australia during the festival.

In 2016 he created a short film with his smartphone, called No Budget.

=== Playwriting ===
Stollery has written at least one play, The Copernican (as of October 2024 not yet performed).

== Other roles ==
As of 2024 Stollery is an ambassador for SmartFone Flick Fest (SF3), held annually in Sydney.

== Recognition and awards ==
=== Stage acting ===
Stollery has been nominated for a Green Room Award twice, and for Sydney Theatre Awards three times. He won Best Actor at the latter in 2009.

=== Filmmaking ===
As of 2024, Stollery's short films have won over 30 awards internationally, including at Palm Springs, Aspen Shortsfest, and Best Screenplay at Flickerfest.

In 2016, he won Best Film and Best Cinematography at SF3, for his film No Budget.

=== Playwriting ===
In September 2024 Stollery won the inaugural Cooper Prize for playwriting at the 16th Street Actors Studio in Melbourne, with his script The Copernican.
