= Pulp =

Pulp may refer to:

- Pulp (fruit), the inner flesh of fruit
- Pulp (band), an English rock band

== Engineering ==
- Pulp (paper), the fibrous material used to make paper
- Dissolving pulp, highly purified cellulose used in fibre and film manufacture
- Molded pulp, a packaging material
- Ore pulp, a mixture of finely ground ore, water, and chemicals used in the froth flotation process for mineral processing

== Biology and medics ==
- Pulp (finger)
- Pulp (spleen)
- Pulp (tooth)
- Beet pulp, a byproduct from the processing of sugar beet which is used as fodder
- Citrus pulp, the juice vesicles of a citrus fruit

== Film ==
- Pulp (1972 film), a 1972 British comedy thriller film, directed by Mike Hodges
- Pulp (2012 film), a British comedy film directed by Adam Hamdy and Shaun Magher

== Publications ==
- Pulp magazine (or pulp fiction), inexpensive fiction magazines, published from 1896 to 1950s
- Pulp (Filipino music magazine)
- Pulp (manga magazine), a monthly manga anthology
- Pulp (novel), by Charles Bukowski
- Pulp (student publication), an online publication of the University of Sydney, Australia

== Other uses ==
- Pulp (juice), a brand of juice
- Pulp, Wisconsin, an unincorporated community
- Pulp, a term in tennis for when the score is 30–30
- PuLP, support for programming optimization problems using the Python language; see COIN-OR § PuLP

== See also ==
- Pulp fiction (disambiguation)
- Plup, American Super Smash Bros. player
