= Richard Appleton =

Australian poet and raconteur

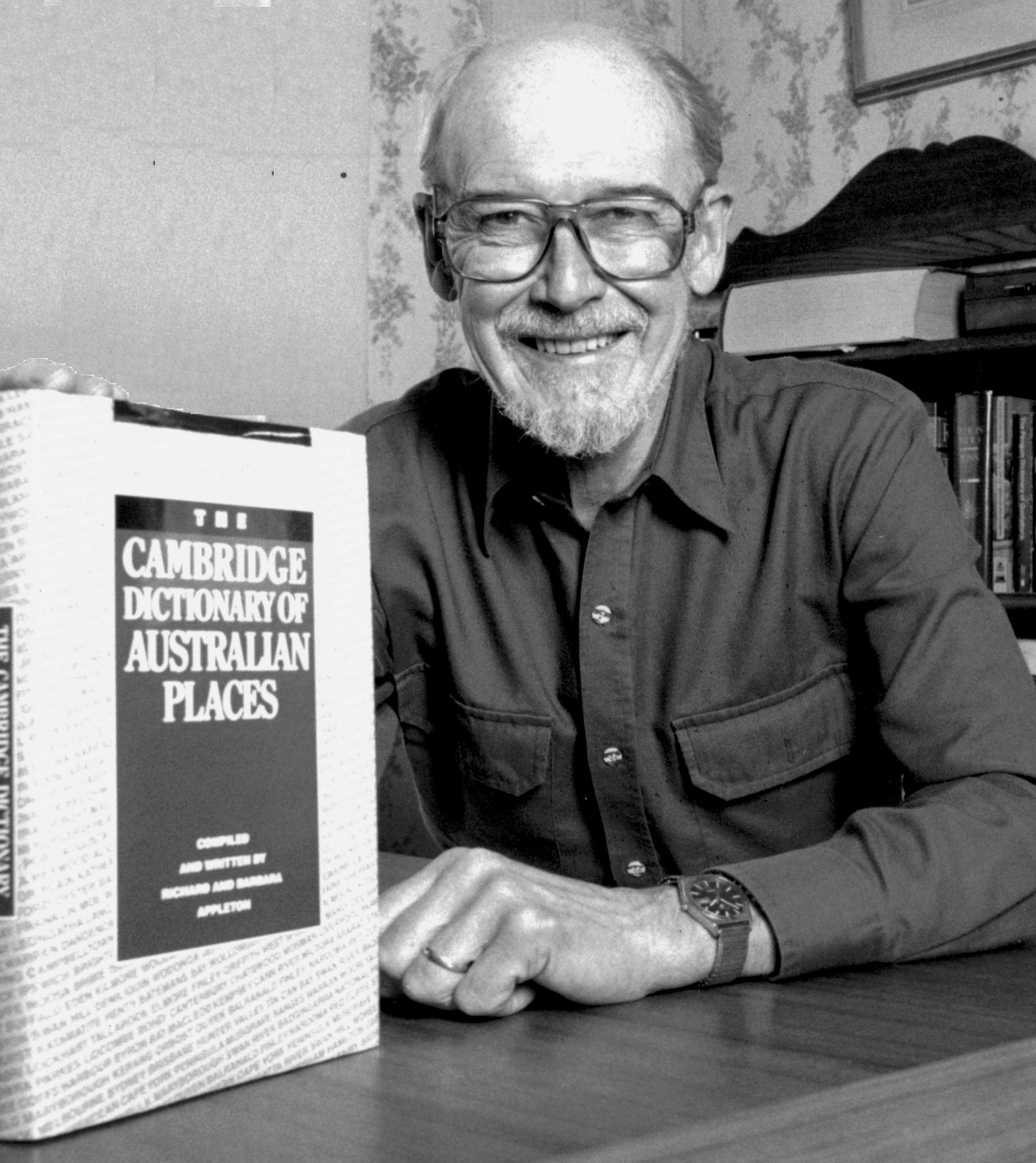
Richard Appleton

Richard Appleton (17 January 1932 – 27 April 2005) was an Australian poet, raconteur and editor who became editor-in-chief of the Australian Encyclopaedia and, in 1987, was co-editor with Alex Galloway of the posthumous Lex Banning poetry collection There Was a Crooked Man. He was a long-time associate of the Sydney Push, of which his memoirs were published posthumously in 2009. He helped create The Pluralist, a journal of dissident thought.

== Biography ==
Appleton was born at Mosman, Sydney, NSW and died at Cessnock NSW. He was educated at North Sydney Boys' High School, the Royal Australian Naval College and Sydney University where he was a devotee of John Anderson and co-edited an issue of the annual Arna. He also attended and graduated from a Melbourne teachers' college in 1957-1958—"a crash course of only one year to become a qualified teacher".

He entered publishing in about 1967, and became editor-in-chief of the Australian Encyclopaedia in 1977, overseeing the fourth edition (1983) and the fifth edition (1988). As a freelance in later years, in conjunction with his wife, Barbara, he compiled the Cambridge Dictionary of Australian Places. In the 1980s Appleton edited the Australian content of the Encyclopædia Britannica. In 2008, he was honoured posthumously by the Australian Labor Party for services to the party.

Appleton was described in Clive James's 2003 book As of This Writing as "among the most gifted" Australian poets of his time. In the same book he lamented Appleton's "premature death." After Appleton's name was mentioned during an ABC talk, James learnt that he was, in fact, still alive and rang to apologise. "I was happy to forgive him," Appleton said. "After all, not everybody gets to read his own obituary, and a glowing one at that."

== Bibliography ==
- Robin Brown (auth), Richard Appleton (ed.), Manning Clark (foreword) Milestones in Australian History William Collins, Sydney, 1986
- Richard Appleton and Alex Galloway [eds] There Was a Crooked Man: The Poems of Lex Banning, Sirius, Australia, 1987; ISBN 0-207-15459-7
- Richard Appleton I Am The World: Poems 1951-1953 Edwards & Shaw, Sydney, 1953
- Richard and Barbara Appleton (comp.) The Cambridge Dictionary of Australian Places Cambridge University Press, Melbourne, 1992
