= Last King of the Cross =

Australian streaming TV series (2023– )

- Genre: Crime thriller
- Based on: Last King of the Cross by John Ibrahim
- Starring: Lincoln Younes; Claude Jabbour; Tim Roth; Callan Mulvey; Matt Nable; Uli Latukefu; Naveen Andrews; Luke Arnold
- Composer: Antony Partos
- Country of origin: Australia
- Original language: English
- No. of seasons: 2
- No. of episodes: 18

Production
- Executive producers: James Durie; Mark Fennessy; Tom Misselbrook; John Ibrahim; Rick Maier
- Producers: Karl Zwicky; Alexander Pettaras; Alexandra Doering
- Cinematography: Bruce Young
- Editors: Nicole La Macchia; James Manche; Stafford Jackson Wales; Mark Perry
- Running time: 44–62 minutes
- Production companies: Cineflix; Helium Pictures

Original release
- Network: Paramount+
- Release: 17 February 2023 – 11 October 2024

Last King of the Cross is an Australian crime thriller television series on Paramount+, which premiered on 17 February 2023. The series is inspired by the autobiography of nightclub owner John Ibrahim and his experiences in Sydney's Kings Cross and Oxford Street. It is produced by Helium Pictures and distributed internationally through Cineflix Rights. The second season premiered on 30 August 2024. On 7 November 2025, it was announced at the Paramount Upfronts a third season of Last King of the Cross was in development.

== Premise ==
The series follows John Ibrahim's (Lincoln Younes) journey from early poverty amid a Lebanese immigrant family to later success. Despite a lack of prospects, he becomes a nightclub mogul of Sydney's Kings Cross, known as much for entertainment as for crime and vice.

Once established in King's Cross, Ibrahim sets his sights on 1990s Oxford Street in Sydney.

== Cast ==
=== Main ===
- Lincoln Younes as John Ibrahim
- Claude Jabbour as Sam Ibrahim
- Tim Roth as Ezra Shipman (season 1)
- Callan Mulvey as Detective Sergeant Brian Crellan (season 1)
- Matt Nable as Anthony 'Big Tony' Stone
- Uli Latukefu as Tongan Sam (recurring season 1; season 2)
- Naveen Andrews as Ray Kinnock (season 2)
- Luke Arnold as Dean Taylor (season 2)

=== Recurring ===
- Christopher Stollery as Inspector Doug Kemp
- Kevin Khan as Anh Tien
- Tess Haubrich as Detective Liz Doyle
- Maria Tran as Madame Tien
- Hoa Xuande as Romeo
- Damian Walshe-Howling as Joey Romano
- Wesley Patten as Brett
- Jake Ryan as Gibbo
- Josh Kempen as Clarence
- Ethan Lamb-Kelly as a teenage Dave Campbell
- Tony Nikolakopoulos as Fat George
- Setareh Naghoni as Wahiba Ibrahim
- Simon Elrahi as Peter 'PK' Kay
- Robert Rabiah as Jamour Ibrahim
- Justin Rosniak as Declan Mooney
- Wadih Dona as Nasa Kalouri
- Allegra Monk as Molly Lewellyn
- Malek Alkoni as teenage John Ibrahim
- Brandon Nguyen as Bui Doi Kid #2
- Daniel Widdowson as Clarkey
- Joseph Frangie as Angelo Lombardi
- Buffy Anne Littaua as Diane
- Rob Carlton as The Fixer
- John Brumpton as Ashtray Frank Amente
- Bren Foster as Pete Reynolds
- Fletcher Humphrys as Richard Needham

=== Guests ===
- Russell Dykstra as Bartuccio
- Jon Sivewright as Barman
- Lani Tupu as Eldon Sami
- Luke Ford as Valentine Bracks

== Episodes ==
=== Series overview ===
Season	Episodes	Originally released	
Season	Episodes	First released	Last released
1	10	February 17, 2023	April 14, 2023
2	8	August 30, 2024	October 11, 2024

=== Series 1 (2023) ===
No. overall	No. in season	Title	Directed by	Written by	Original release date
1	1	"Episode 1"	Kieran Darcy-Smith	Kieran Darcy-Smith	February 17, 2023
2	2	"Episode 2"	Kieran Darcy-Smith	Kieran Darcy-Smith	February 17, 2023
3	3	"Episode 3"	Catherine Millar	Morgan O'Neill	February 24, 2023
4	4	"Episode 4"	Catherine Millar	Jane Allen	March 3, 2023
5	5	"Episode 5"	Grant Brown	Alastair Newton Brown	March 10, 2023
6	6	"Episode 6"	Grant Brown	Matt Nable	March 17, 2023
7	7	"Episode 7"	Ian Watson	James Pope	March 24, 2023
8	8	"Episode 8"	Ian Watson	Morgan O'Neill	March 31, 2023
9	9	"Episode 9"	Grant Brown & Kieran Darcy-Smith	Kieran Darcy-Smith	April 7, 2023
10	10	"Episode 10"	Grant Brown & Kieran Darcy-Smith	Morgan O’Neill	April 14, 2023

=== Series 2 (2024) ===
No. overall	No. in season	Title	Directed by	Written by	Original release date
11	1	"Episode 1"	Grant Brown	Sam Meikle	August 30, 2024
12	2	"Episode 2"	Grant Brown	Fin Edquist	August 30, 2024
13	3	"Episode 3"	Grant Brown	Sarah Smith	September 6, 2024
14	4	"Episode 4"	Ian Watson	Tim Pye	September 13, 2024
15	5	"Episode 5"	Ian Watson	James Pope	September 20, 2024
16	6	"Episode 6"	Ian Watson	Sam Meikle	September 27, 2024
17	7	"Episode 7"	Tori Garrett	Jane Allen	October 4, 2024
18	8	"Episode 8"	Tori Garrett	Fin Edquist	October 11, 2024

== Production ==
Filming of the first season began in 2022, with strict COVID-19 protocols in place. A car park in Western Sydney was converted to recreate the Kings Cross area. The team had to film amid torrential rain, amid the 2022 New South Wales floods.

Ian McShane had originally been cast as Ezra Shipman, but had to withdraw citing health reasons. The role was recast with Tim Roth.

== Reception ==
The first season of the show became the most-watched Australian series on Paramount+.

== See also ==
- List of Australian television series
