= Virgil Lo Schiavo =

Italian painter

Vergil Lo Schiavo
- Born: November 3, 1909; Malfa, Italy
- Died: September 1971 (aged 61)
- Education: University of Sydney
- Known for: Visual Art
- Spouse: Elcie Wyse

Vergil Lo Schiavo (3 November 1909 – September 1971), also known as Virgil Lo Schiavo and nicknamed 'Vig', was an Italian-born Australian visual artist based in Sydney.

== Early life and education ==
Born in Italy, Lo Schiavo grew up in Sydney, with one younger brother (Dario, a prominent fencer) and two sisters (one of whom, Lydia, became a teacher at Newcastle Technical High School), as well as an aunt and her three children. According to Dario, his father was a titled aristocrat with little money, who migrated to Australia in the late 1890s and operated a shop in Market Street, Sydney. According to Lydia, the family had been landowners on the island of Salina near Sicily, and their grandfather had been a governor of the Lipari Islands before migrating to Australia. His mother was a teacher at the Sapienza University of Rome, and migrated to Australia in the early 1900s. The family were devoutly Catholic, and at the mother's insistence, all the children learned Italian or French; according to his brother, Vergil spoke five languages.

Lo Schiavo's father owned blocks of apartments in the Eastern Suburbs, and was financially ruined when the Great Depression hit, and Premier Jack Lang announced a moratorium on rent. After a stroke, Lo Schiavo's father went back to Rome in 1930 or 1931 in search of a cure, but died in 1942.

The family were living in Yurong St, East Sydney, since before 1918, when it was a down-at-heel suburb and a man was killed by a razor gang in the laneway next to the house. They moved to Victoria Street in Potts Point around 1924. His family hosted many prominent members of the arts community at their house, including the actors Peter Finch and Chips Rafferty, and the illustrator Unk White. Finch lived with the Lo Schiavo family for six months, during which time they taught him to fence, and he was a model for Lo Schiavo for two paintings executed for St Mary's Cathedral, Sydney, of St Stephen and St Sebastian.

Lo Schiavo attended the University of Sydney, where he was an active member of the community, graduating with a BA in 1932. Already a promising artist, his vignettes of the university were well received in the Sydney Mail. In connection with a Commemoration Day student riot in 1929, he was convicted of riotous conduct and suspended for the university for perceived disrespect at the Sydney Cenotaph in Martin Place.

After his studies in Sydney, in June 1933 Lo Schiavo went to Rome and Florence and obtained Diplomas of Arts cum laude in 1934 from the Accademia di Belle Arti di Roma, (the first Australian to do so) and in 1935 from the Accademia di Belle Arti di Firenze. He returned from Italy in the company of his sister Lydia in 1935, and gave his positive impressions of Italy under Mussolini in the Sydney Giornale Italiano and the Sydney Morning Herald. He had earlier written an essay in Il Giornale Italiano in praise of fascism in 1933.

It was in Italy that he learned to fence, and he later became a New South Wales champion (winning both foil and sabre in 1937) and taught his brother Dario, who founded the Sydney University Fencing Club.

== Career ==
Lo Schiavo taught at both the Dattilo-Rubbo Art School in Sydney and at East Sydney Technical College. He had a studio on Wylde Street in Potts Point. In 1937 he opened an art school at 122 Harrington Street.

Lo Schiavo was mainly known as a muralist, executing works in Australia, India, and Italy.

In 1933 during his education in Rome, he completed a mural of the Apotheosis of St Laurence in the Chiesa di San Lorenzo Martire in his native Malfa. During World War II, he contracted rheumatic fever in India and was left with little energy to complete his murals.

In 1939 he departed for then Bombay, where he painted 27 murals in (then) the New Ritz Hotel. His work Sleeping Bombay Coolies was a finalist for the Sulman Prize in 1944.

Lo Schiavo produced a number of sacred murals in Australia. He executed murals for the Cathedral of St Stephen in Brisbane, commissioned by Archbishop James Duhig during World War II but now painted out, as well as a canvas The Martyrdom of St Stephen, 'the biggest of its kind ever undertaken in Australia’, according to the archbishop. He also executed a 1938 mural in Christ Church St Laurence in Sydney.

He also took on commercial clients. He installed an allegorical mural in the Collins Street offices of the Commonwealth Bank in Melbourne. He executed two murals in Newcastle; including one in the Commonwealth Bank. The mural inside the former Rural Bank building, depicting Newcastle in about 1824, is unaccounted for after renovations to the building in 1984.

Lo Schiavo contributed several major murals at the University of Sydney and its colleges. He designed the mosaics for the chapel in Freehill Memorial Tower at St John's College. In the university, Lo Schiavo is most famous for his three murals in the Holme Building at the University of Sydney Union: in the upper galleries of the building, the Sulman-Prize-winning mural Tribute to Shakespeare (1945)., and the Sulman-Prize finalist mural Characters from Dickens (1951).

In the main hall of the Refectory is his monumental Mankind (1970). The artist told the Sydney Morning Herald, "the student [at the centre of the mural] is holding a book, but whether it is Karl Marx or the Bible, I am not saying." He painted this final mural free of charge, with the Union only bearing costs for scaffolding.

Not long after completing Mankind, Lo Schiavo returned to Rome, where he died aged 61 in September 1971.
