= John Ibrahim =

Australian entrepreneur (born 1970)

- Born: John Houssam Ibrahim; August 25, 1970 (age 56); Tripoli, Lebanon
- Citizenship: Australia
- Occupation: Nightclub owner
- Known for: Alleged organised crime links

John Houssam Ibrahim (born 25 August 1970) is a former Kings Cross nightclub owner in Australia. Police allege Ibrahim is a "major organised-crime figure" and was labelled as the "lifeblood of the drugs industry of Kings Cross" during the 1995 Wood royal commission. However, Ibrahim strongly denies this, and has not been convicted of any related crime.

== Early years ==
John Ibrahim was born in 1970 in Tripoli, Lebanon, before emigrating with his family to Australia as a child. Ibrahim is the second of four sons and two daughters born to Wahiba Ibrahim and her husband. Often referred to as the "Ibrahim brothers", the eldest son is Hassan "Sam" (b. c. 1966), followed by John, Fadi (b. c. 1974), and the youngest son is Michael (b. c. 1979).

At age 16, Ibrahim witnessed the brother of Bill Bayeh being attacked by two men. Ibrahim became involved and ended up receiving a large knife wound to his torso; and was treated at St Vincent's Hospital, Sydney and placed into a coma for three weeks, followed by six months' recovery in the hospital, due to extensive damage to his lungs, liver, and intestines. The stabbing resulted in a large scar.

== Business and personal interests ==
Aged 18 years old, Ibrahim acquired his first nightclub in Kings Cross, taking a 20% stake in a club then known as Tunnel Cabaret. Ibrahim sold the club in 2001 and its name changed to EP1; with police unsuccessfully taking legal action to have the venue closed, alleging it was part of organised drug activities in Kings Cross. In 2004, new owners relaunched the Earl Place club as Dragonfly then it came again under Ibrahim's ownership, renaming it The Tunnel before closing down permanently. Ibrahim is allegedly associated with a minimum of 17 nightclubs in Sydney's Kings Cross.

In 1992, Ibrahim left home, aged 22 years, and rented a Dover Heights cliff-side property of 528 square metres (5,680 sq ft). Less than ten years later, he purchased the property for $1.165 million. In 2008, the house was worth $3 million and has subsequently undergone significant redevelopment. Ibrahim owns two other properties in the same street, purchased for $2.5 million in 2007, one of which is leased to Kyle Sandilands, a radio and TV personality and business partner of Ibrahim's.

Ibrahim has allegedly provided bank guarantees to various family members and holds property in his own name or in the name of companies associated with him. He has provided a $112,000 guarantee to his sister, Maha Sayour, in 1997 for her South Wentworthville home and acquiring a Merrylands property worth $253,000 in 2004 for allegedly no-cost. In his most recent public property purchase, in 2010 Ibrahim purchased a housing development site at Rothbury in the Hunter Valley for $275,000.

Following an incident in April 2011 involving NRL Roosters players Todd Carney and Anthony Watts, the NSW Government ordered an inquiry into whether the Trademark hotel, located in Kings Cross and owned by Ibrahim, breached laws on the responsible service of alcohol. The inquiry follows the December 2010 incident involving John Hopoate, who was subsequently convicted of the assault of a patron outside Trademark. It was reported that since July 2009 over 529 assaults have occurred either at Trademark, with Trademark security staff involvement or near the venue. Trademark is presently subject to a reduction in trading hours, restricted patron numbers, and increased security by scanning patrons with metal detectors.

Ibrahim's portrait by Oliver Watts, titled Last King of the Cross, was a finalist for the 2024 Archibald Prize.

== Alleged links to organised crime ==
Ibrahim has been labelled by the Australian news media as "Teflon John" and "The Teflon man of Kings Cross" as well as also being known as "The King of the Cross" due to his ability to avoid being convicted of illegal activities, despite widespread public suspicion. As a teenager, he was convicted of assault, but has not been found guilty of any crime since then.

During the Wood Royal Commission, Ibrahim was identified by Counsel assisting the Commission, John Agius SC, as the new "lifeblood of the drugs industry of Kings Cross". During a 2004 trial, Ibrahim was identified as "the subject of 546 police intelligence reports in relation to his involvement in drugs, organised crime and association with outlaw motorcycle gangs". During 2001 and 2002, a police strikeforce Sombra gathered intelligence claiming that Ibrahim was allegedly extorting a number of bars and nightclubs in the Kings Cross and Darlinghurst area up to $5,000 per week each, claiming a beneficial financial interest in club takings and allegedly applying standover tactics. It was reported that police investigations were allegedly compromised by officers from the New South Wales Crime Commission when Ibrahim was informed that his Dover Heights home was bugged. Ibrahim commenced legal action in the NSW Administrative Decisions Tribunal and sought access to the intelligence reports on him. His application was refused and police never charged Ibrahim for the alleged offences. Ibrahim was implicated in subsequent investigations during 2003 and 2004 by Task Force Gain from the NSW Crime Commission, targeting violent crime in southwest Sydney.

In 2006, the NSW Crime Commission seized assets, including his Dover Heights home, on the balance of probabilities that Ibrahim had allegedly engaged in criminal activity. Subsequent orders were made in the Supreme Court that Ibrahim pay to the State $150,000 without admission of guilt. On payment of the order, the Commission removed its restraining order over the assets.

=== Media ===
In a 2010 episode broadcast on ABC TV, Media Watch criticised the fascination of The Daily Telegraph with Ibrahim and his family. Since the 2009 shooting of Fadi Ibrahim, the family has regularly featured in The Daily Telegraph, where it was revealed that Ibrahim provided the paper with photos and stories about himself; yet at the same time, claiming to "hate attention" and complaining about the media attention he is receiving.

Ibrahim was portrayed by Middle Eastern Australian actor Firass Dirani in the 2010 television miniseries Underbelly: The Golden Mile, a fictional dramatic representation of Kings Cross organised crime. He was also played by Lincoln Younes in the 2023-2024 television series, Last King Of The Cross, a series based on Ibrahim’s life.

In 2014, the Australian Financial Review published a detailed profile on Ibrahim. Ibrahim told an AFR journalist Christopher Joye: "Who really shoots other people’s houses in the middle of the night...In my time that was unheard of...These guys are gutless cowards. The class of 2010 onwards has been the shittiest ever. They’re just plastic gangsters. They drive around in their hotted up cars with gold chains and tattoos and then they go home and sleep at mum’s. They’re all wannabes. Cuz it’s disgusting – it’s all disorganised crime."

Australian journalist Kyle Sandilands has revealed that he was with John Ibrahim when he, his brother and his brother’s girlfriend were shot in their car. Sandilands also says that John is a good man.

=== Family associates of Ibrahim ===
Ibrahim's elder brother, Sam Ibrahim, was one of the first Lebanese-Australian men to be allowed to join an Australian outlaw motorcycle club. In 1997, Sam Ibrahim was elected president of the Granville chapter of the Nomads Motorcycle Club. This chapter of the Nomads subsequently became a powerful criminal organisation in Sydney. However, due to a falling out with the Nomads' leadership group, the chapter splintered in 2007 to form a new outlaw motorcycle club, the Notorious gang. Sam Ibrahim remains a life member of the Nomads Motorcycle Club. It has been reported in the media that the Notorious gang is currently being used as street muscle to support the distribution of illegal drugs in Kings Cross and around Sydney.

Sam Ibrahim was charged in 2004 with the kneecapping of two men in Newcastle. He was also charged during the late 1990s, over a cocaine distribution ring involving the Nomads – but was acquitted on both matters. In 2009, Sam Ibrahim was charged over the alleged kidnapping of a teenage boy and held in custody for four months until bail was granted in July 2009. At the time of the bail hearing, it was reported that police were also investigating a second suspect in the alleged incident, Nimilote Ngata. Ngata (b. ca 1988) is the son of John Ibrahim's bodyguard, Semi "Tongan Sam" Ngata. In July 2009, "Tongan Sam" Ngata, was arrested following a raid on his home by a special gang violence taskforce that netted bulk quantities of a methamphetamine precursor.

Ibrahim's sister, Maha Sayour (b. ca 1971), was charged in 2009 with recklessly dealing with proceeds of crime following a police raid on her South Wentworthville home where police allegedly found shrink-wrapped packets bulging with nearly $2.86 million cash in $50 and $100 notes hidden in the roof. The matter was committed for trial and heard before a District Court judge in December 2011, who found her not guilty.

Two of Ibrahim's brothers, Michael and Fadi, were in May 2011, together with Rodney Phillip "Goldy" Atkinson, ordered to stand trial on a charge of conspiracy to murder John Macris between July and September 2009. Police allege that Michael and Fadi Ibrahim and Atkinson believed that Macris was behind the shooting of Fadi in June 2009. In December 2012, Michael Ibrahim and Atkinson were acquitted of the conspiracy to murder charge; however Michael remains in custody for an unrelated manslaughter conviction, and Atkinson has been found guilty of possessing an unauthorised pistol. He is on remand and will be sentenced in January 2013.

Ibrahim and Melissa Taylor's son Daniel John Taylor (b. ca 1990), was committed in early 2011 to stand trial in Queensland on charges of affray and assault occasioning bodily harm on a group of Melbourne tourists outside a nightclub on the Gold Coast in 2010. It is alleged that Taylor was assisted by a co-accused and that the two were jointly involved. Taylor's bail conditions require him to reside with Ibrahim in Sydney and ordered not to go within 1 kilometre (0.62 mi) of Kings Cross despite Taylor working in the nightclub industry until the matter is heard before the courts. All charges were dropped.

Michael and Fadi Ibrahim, and others, were arrested in Dubai, United Arab Emirates and John Ibrahim's girlfriend, Sarah Budge, and his son, Daniel were arrested after action by police in Australia and the Netherlands as part of Operation Veyda in relation to two alleged major international drug syndicates operating in Australia. Budge was charged with possession of a firearm. Australian Federal Police assistant commissioner Neil Gaughan said that "More than 1.8 tonnes of MDMA (ecstasy), 136 kilograms of cocaine and 15 kg of methamphetamine were stopped from reaching Australian shores. $5.5 million dollars was also seized". Michael pled guilty to eight charges. In May 2020 he was sentenced to a jail term of 30 years, with an 18 year non-parole period.

== See also ==
- Last King of the Cross
