= Wesley Patten =

Australian actor

- Occupation: Actor
- Years active: 2017–present

Wesley Patten is an Indigenous Australian actor. He was nominated for the 2020 AACTA Award for Best Actor in a Supporting Role for his role in H is for Happiness.

In 2019, Patten was named as part of the cast for ABC political drama Total Control in the role of Eddie Irving, Patten appeared in all three seasons of the series.

In 2022, Patten was named as part of the extended cast for Last King of the Cross.

== Filmography ==
Year	Title	Role	Notes
2025	Scrublands: Silver	Teen Scotty	3 episodes
2019-24	Total Control (TV series)	Eddie Irving	18 episodes
2023	Last King of the Cross	Brett	3 episodes
2020	Black Comedy	Guest	1 episode

=== Film appearances ===
Year	Title	Role	Notes
2019	H is for Happiness	Douglas Benson	
2017	Mrs McCutcheon	Trevor	Short
