= Lex Banning =

Australian poet (1921–1965)

Arthur Alexander Banning (1921–1965) was an Australian lyric poet. Disabled from birth by cerebral palsy, he was unable to speak clearly or to write with a pen. "Yet he overcame his handicap to produce poems which were often hauntingly beautiful and frequently ironic, and gave to other, younger poets a strong sense of the importance and value of their calling". Such younger poets included Clive James, Les Murray and Geoffrey Lehmann.

== Early life ==
=== A note on sources ===
By good fortune, one of Banning's closest friends was the late Richard Appleton ("Appo"), a bohemian writer and raconteur who met the poet in Sydney's Lincoln coffee lounge, about 1950. Appleton later became editor-in-chief of the Australian Encyclopaedia and, in 1983, was co-editor with Alex Galloway of the posthumous Banning collection There Was a Crooked Man which includes reliable biographical information. In writing this, Appleton received the benefit of access to a collection of letters in the possession of Dr Anne Banning.

=== Birth and disability ===
Lex Banning was born in Sydney on 27 June 1921. His mother was half-Swedish, half Scots. His father (who died when Lex was aged four) was Belgian. His disability was cerebral palsy of a type brought about by insufficiency of oxygen in the bloodstream during or soon after birth. Though this resulted in little or no intellectual impairment, he was afflicted by involuntary movements and poor co-ordination of arms, neck and face, because of which his speech was laboured and hard to understand. The disabilities were ultimately no barrier to effective communication nor to the respect and admiration of people who knew him.

=== Education and early career ===
The family home was in the Sydney suburb of Punchbowl and Lex attended ordinary state primary and secondary schools through which he acquired superior reading skills and was introduced to encyclopaedias. Though denied a full secondary education, at the age of sixteen he was found a job at the Sydney Observatory. There, he learned to type and was able to qualify for admittance to the Faculty of Arts at Sydney University as an unmatriculated student in 1944. He graduated in 1948 with honours in English and history. He was an active and enthusiastic participant in university affairs, including writing for and editing university publications. A poem of his, 1946, appeared in the 1946 university Arts Society annual Arna.

== Later career and associations ==
Later, Banning worked as a librarian at the Spastic Centre while also writing for print, radio, film and television. He was a regular associate of Sydney Push and media personalities including close friend and biographer Richard Appleton, Joy Anderson, Robert Hughes, Piers Bourke, John Croyston, Mike and Marjorie Hourihan and Brian Jenkins. Accomplished jazz musician Ray Price and his distinguished wife Nadine Amadio were also close friends.

== Poetry ==
For Lex Banning, the fundamental task of poetry was compression, to which end the poet's skills and artifices were instrumental. He greatly admired the Japanese haiku form and its supreme exponent Matsuo Bashō and the Alexandrian Greek poet C. P. Cavafy. To a lecturer who described poetry as "not the wine but the brandy of literature", Banning sternly interjected: "Not the brandy ... the cognac!" For notwithstanding his own physical disability, Banning was the toughest of critics and no respecter of personalities. His acerbic wit was frequently expressed in blunt conversation, and some of his satirical verse did not bear publication for that reason.

Galloway observes that "the purity of the poem remains his concern as he expunges the element of self-expression in favour of the universal" and invites consideration of these lines from The Dark Soul (1951):

The dark soul goes lonely,
it seeks, but cannot find
its heart's desire among the whirling
planets of the mind.

For mind is as a universe,
a bounded, boundless place,
but a prison to the dark soul
that never finds its grace;

not though it search for ever,
or the small space of a breath,
for the soul is immortal,
and what it seeks is death.

Galloway concludes: "[I]n compiling this collection, I have come to understand his appeal. His sculptured verse is wrought from figures of the past, from acute seeing in the now, from awareness of the significance of shadows which give meaning and dimension to the structure of images. You may hear the voice of thought, see the vision of clear sight, feel the brooding presence of an entity beyond the immediate grasp of the mind, and glimpse the monstrous and the beautiful apprehension allowed to a poet".

== Last years ==
In 1962, he travelled to London and married Australian paediatrician Anne Ferry. Through senior medical contacts who admired his poetry, Banning was invited to visit the Aegean Islands aboard a luxury yacht and develop his interest in palaeontology and his love of the work of Constantine P. Cavafy. However, the marriage foundered and Banning returned to Sydney in 1964, to live alone in a small flat at Darlinghurst. He became depressed and unwell before his sudden death less than a year later on 2 November 1965.

== Bibliography ==
- Everyman his own Hamlet (1951)
- The Instant's Clarity (1952)
- Apocalypse in Springtime (1956)
- There was a Crooked Man : the Poems of Lex Banning (1984)
