= Pulp (student publication) =

Pulp Media
- Website type: News and opinion
- Available in: English
- Owner: University of Sydney Union
- Editors: Emily Graetz, Kristin Miao, Fabian Robertson
- Website: www.pulp-usu.com
- Commercial: No
- Launched: March 2, 2016
- Current status: Active

Pulp Media is the online student publication of the University of Sydney Union and was established in 2016. As a replacement for student magazine BULL that was discontinued, Pulp is now the second student-run publication at the University of Sydney alongside student newspaper Honi Soit.

Described as "an online platform for student content", the publication has distinct viral social news and entertainment content ideal for social media sharing. However, the website has also expanded into serious journalism and reportage in 2016.

== History ==
In late 2015, Honi Soit reported that student magazine BULL would be replaced by 'an online news site with more “Buzzfeed style articles”' in 2016. This decision was made by the student Board of Directors who govern the University of Sydney Union after the decreased readership in 2015. It was also confirmed that the website would have “two permanent paid part-time student journalists” appointed for yearly terms and that the new website would be integrated into the current University of Sydney Union website.

Pulp was launched by founding editors Aparna Balakumar and Whitney Duan in 2016. In 2019, Pulp hired its first multilingual editor, Vina Zhou, and began producing articles in both Chinese Mandarin and English in response to the University's large Chinese international student community. In 2021, editor Mia Castagnone and contributor Bella Sträuli Pulp launched Pulp's first podcast series called Pulpcasts, which focused on candid conversations and discussion about student contemporary life. From 2022, Pulp opened a campus-wide print magazine focused on creativity, comedy and culture.

== Content ==
The content of Pulp varies between news, feature articles and culture pieces in line with the priorities of the editors, the University of Sydney Union and the wider reader base. In recent years Pulp produces campus vox pop videos, satire, multilingual content, campus food reviews, short videos, podcasts and in 2022 launched a campus-wide print magazine.
