= List of Archibald Prize 2024 finalists =

This is a list of finalists for the 2024 Archibald Prize for portraiture (listed as Artist – Title). Of the 2,371 entries received for the Archibald Prize, 57 artworks were selected as finalists. As the images are copyrighted, a link to each image is available through its reference.

- Matt Adnate – Rhythms of heritage (Winner: Packing Room Prize 2024)
- Holly Anderson – Not not a mother
- Jill Ansell – Pericles: just scratching the surface
- Mostafa Azimitabar – Angus McDonald
- Eliza Bertwistle – Chanel Contos (smiling feminist)
- Drew Bickford – Direct-to-video
- Natasha Bieniek – Self-portrait with Florence
- Karen Black – Vivian Vidulich
- Mia Boe – Toe Knee Arm Strong
- Jessie Bourke – Different, not less
- Janis Clarke – Beckah in the studio
- Emily Crockford – Singing with my selfie at the top of the world with my imagination
- Dagmar Cyrulla – Le mariage
- Paul de Zubicaray – You can't hurt me anymore
- Whitney Duan – Fluffy (Jordan Gogos)
- Robert Fielding – Mayatja (keeper of song and culture)
- Stephanie Galloway Brown – Kathrin Longhurst
- Shaun Gladwell – A spangled symbolist portrait of Julian Assange floating in reflection
- Jaq Grantford – Ed Le Brocq: I am a centaur
- David Griggs – Cold wind blows
- Craig Handley – Timequake
- Tsering Hannaford – Meditation on seeing (portrait of Dad)
- Nicola Higgins – Missy with her ukulele
- Yoshio Honjo – Akira Isogawa
- Ben Howe – Kylie and Sami
- Laura Jones – Tim Winton (Winner: Archibald Prize 2024)
- Laura E Kennedy – Fluroscuroreduo (diptych after Natasha Bieniek)
- Daniel Kim – Blue jeans and flowers
- Sam Leach – Louise Milligan
- Angus McDonald – Professor Marcia Langton AO
- Guido (Guy) Maestri – Obscured self-portrait
- Kelly Maree – Josh Heuston
- Scott Marsh – Big mood
- Julian Meagher – Fozz – 2024
- Camellia Morris – Wild Wild Wiggle
- Danny Morse – Sean and Claire and Sharon and Debbie
- Anna Mould – Complicit
- Kirsty Neilson – Cheng Lei – after China
- Tim Owers – On the bench and on the cusp (portrait of Cortnee Vine)
- Laura Peacock – Peter at home
- Meagan Pelham – Highlight in the moonlight
- Thea Anamara Perkins – Mum (Hetti)
- Simon Richardson – Portrait of Fiona Pardington
- Thom Roberts – Big Bamm-Bamm
- Adrian Jangala Robertson – Jumpin' Julie, Yuendumu
- Sally Ross – Matthew
- Kean Onn See – Margaret Ackland
- Kris Andrew Small – New
- Ben Smith – If you can see it, you can be it (Darren Dale)
- Nick Stathopoulos – The last picture show – portrait of David Stratton
- Liz Sullivan – Germaine
- Natasha Walsh – The marriage of Nicol and Ford
- Oliver Watts – Last King of the Cross
- Digby Webster – Trevor my filmmaker with camera
- Marcus Wills – Callum
- Zoe Young – Jill's at Bills
- Caroline Zilinsky – A lucid heart – the golden age of Jacob Elordi
