= Jaq Grantford =

Australian artist (born 1967)

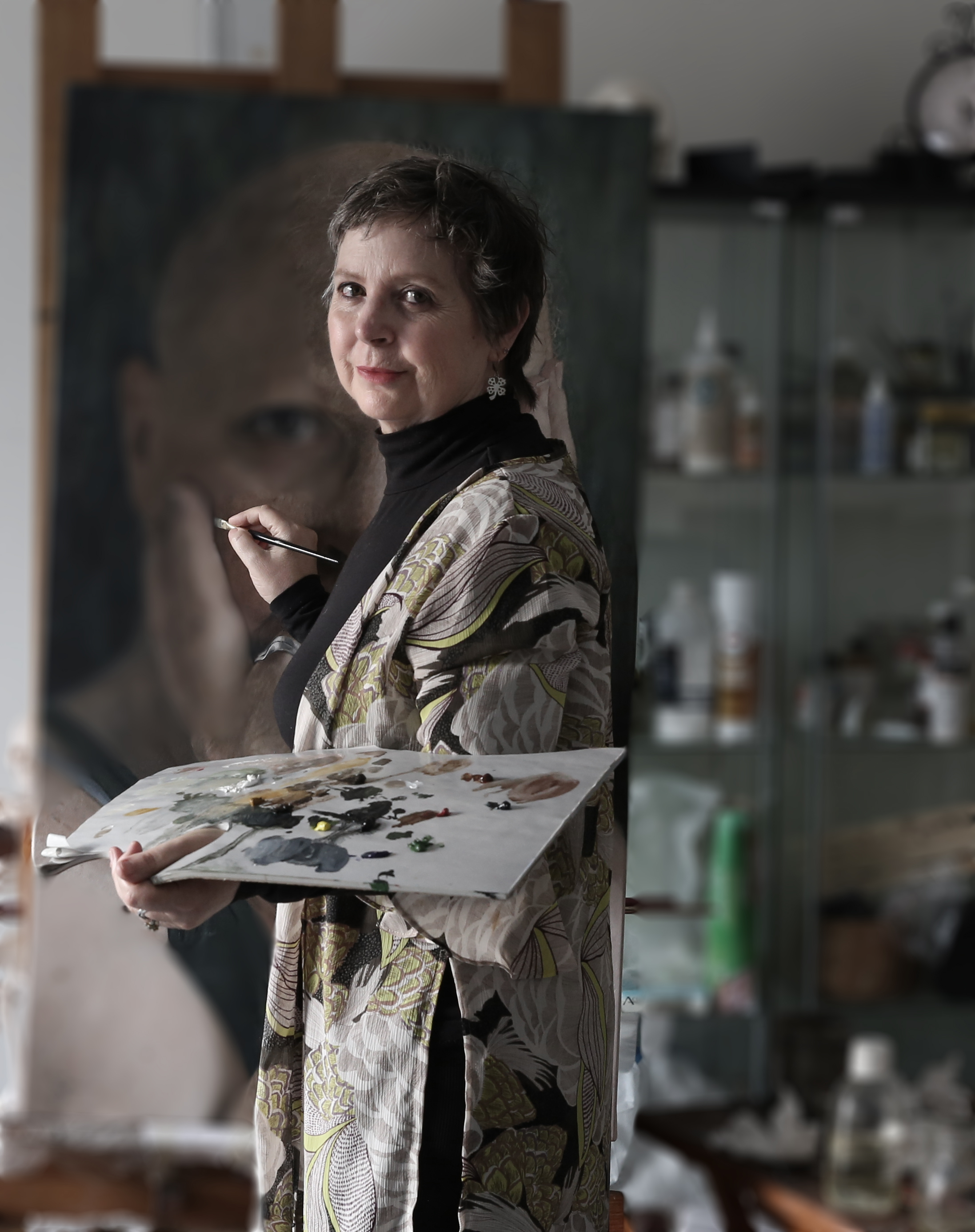
- Born: 1967 (age 58–59); Melbourne, Australia
- Known for: Portrait painting, illustration of children's books
- Movement: Australian contemporary art
- Website: www.jaqgrantford.com

Jaq Grantford (born 1967), also known as Jacqui Grantford, is an Australian artist and writer, known for her portraiture and illustrations of children's books.

== Early life and education ==
Jaq Grantford, also known as Jacqui, was born in Melbourne, Australia, in 1967.

== Career ==
=== Art ===
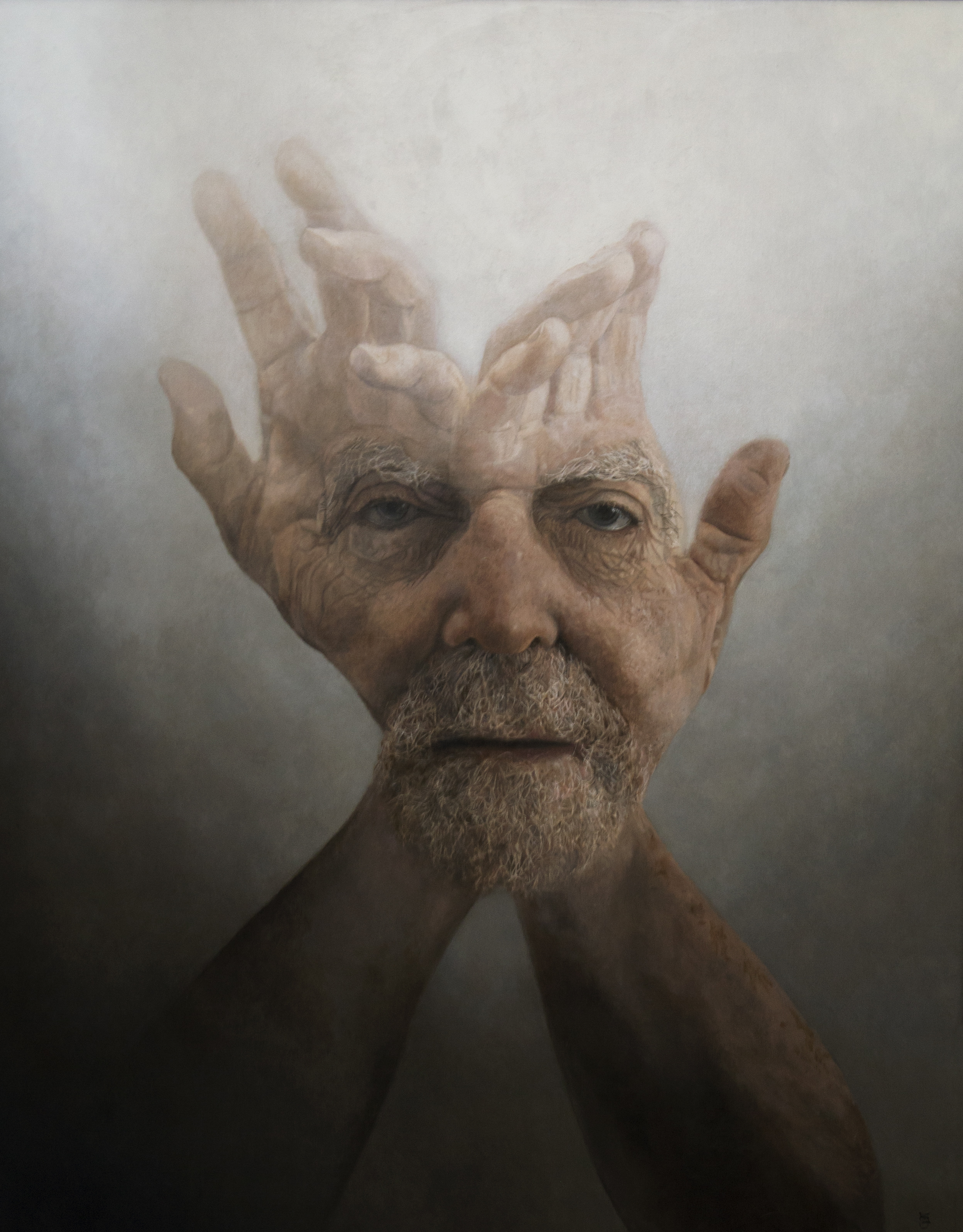
Portrait of pianist and composer Tony Gould by Grantford

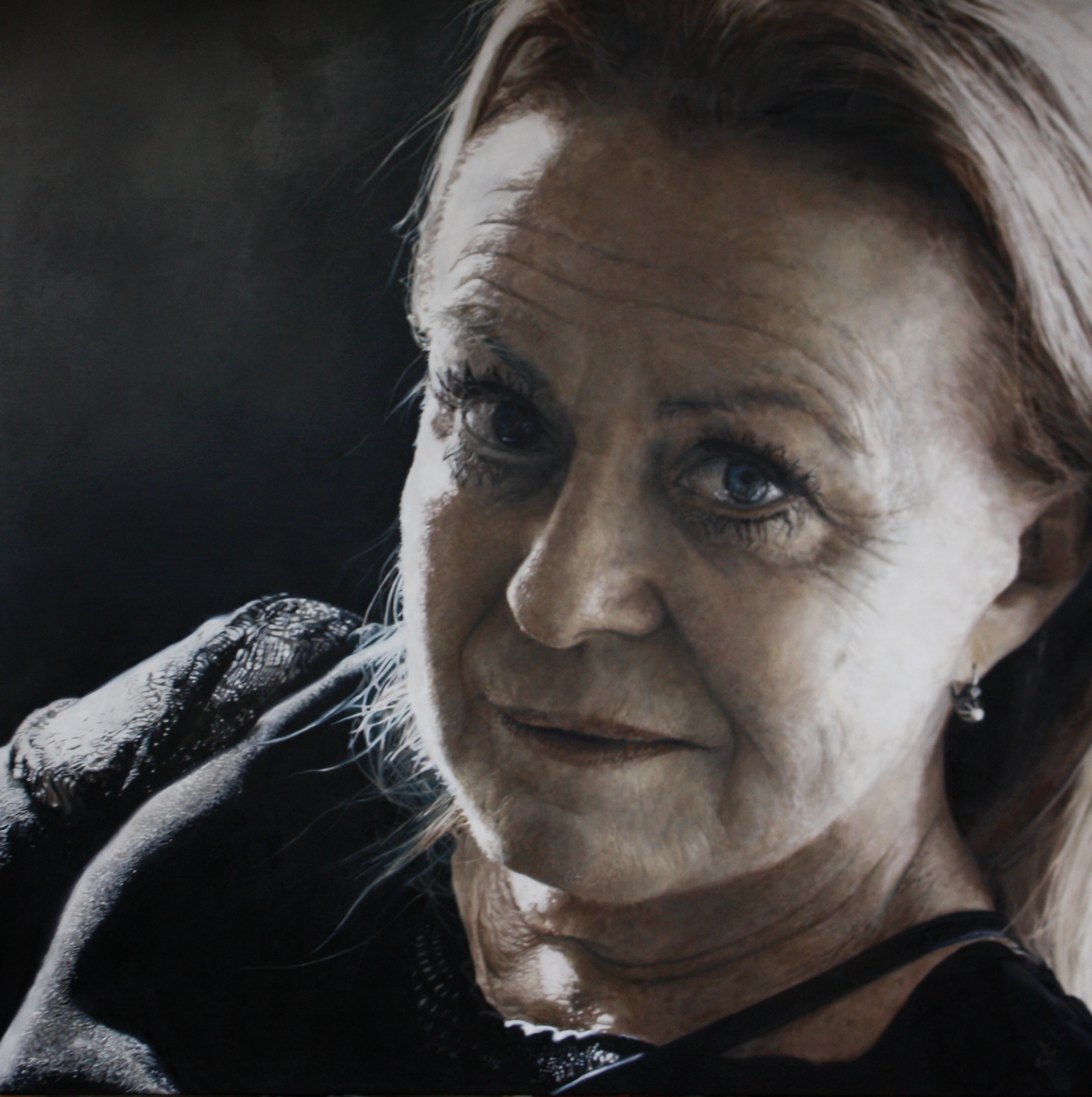
Portrait of Jacki Weaver by Grantford

Grantford's portraits include Noni Hazlehurst, Jacki Weaver, Paul Mercurio, Jonathon Welch, physician Catherine Crock, Lior, Ed Le Brocq, and composers Elena Kats-Chernin, and Nigel Westlake.

In 2023 Grantford won the People's Choice in the Archibald Prize.

Her portrait of transgender radio presenter and musician Ed Le Brocq, in which he is (at his request) portrayed as a centaur, called I Am a Centaur, was selected as a 2024 Archibald Prize finalist.

She has also many painted many self-portraits, including a series in which she places herself in famous paintings by other artists, such as Rembrandt, J. M. W. Turner, Gustave Courbet, René Magritte, and Andy Warhol.

=== Writing ===
In addition to working as a portrait artist and fine artist, Grantford has been publishing books since 2002. A True Person, written by Gabian Marin was one of the 250 outstanding new international books for children and young adults that have been selected for The White Ravens 2008. This book, along with Squeezy Cuddle Dangly Legs written by Peter Whitfield, and Molly's Memory Jar by Norma Spalding have been listed as recommended books in the Family Therapist Awards.

== Recognition and awards ==
- 2013: People's Choice, Black Swan Prize for Portraiture, for a portrait of Jacki Weaver
- 2013: Portrait of Jacki Weaver in the Archibald Prize Salon des Refusés
- 2013: Surrealism Mortimore Art Prize
- 2014: People's Choice, Black Swan Heritage Awards
- 2014: Certificate of Excellence, American Society of Portrait Artists
- 2015: Winner, Master of Art International exhibition, Architecture Award, London
- 2016: People's Choice, Shirley Hannan National Portrait Award
- 2016: Honourable Mention, Park Art Fair International, Germany
- 2016: Winner, Cliftons Art Prize, Melbourne
- 2018: People's Choice, Black Swan Prize for Portraiture, Art Gallery of Western Australia, for a portrait of drag artist Ken Atherton ("Tootsie")
- 2018: Best in Show, Gateway International Painting Competition
- 2019: Winner Kennedy Prize, for her portrait of Ken Atherton
- 2022: Winner Darling Portrait Prize at the National Portrait Gallery of Australia, for a self-portrait called 2020
- 2023: Winner Archibald People's Choice for a portrait of Noni Hazlehurst

She has been a finalist in many other awards, sometimes several times, including the Doug Moran National Portrait Prize, and the Portia Geach Memorial Award. She is an Associate Living Master of the Art Renewal Center in New Jersey.

== Personal life ==
Grantford has two children.

She has been involved in the Melbourne-based charity Hush Foundation, which uses the arts to improve young patients' lives in hospitals, founded by physician Catherine Crock.

== Exhibitions ==
Grantford held several solo exhibitions at the Dromkeen Museum of Children's Literature between 2004 and 2010. In 2007, some of her work was displayed in international exhibitions of children's book illustration in Portugal and Slovakia.

Her work was selected for Women Painting Women, an exhibition of portraits held at the Burrinja Cultural Centre in Upwey in Melbourne in 2016 and 2021, and in 2021 she was included in a women's art exhibition at the European Museum of Modern Art in Barcelona, Spain.

== Collections ==
Her work is held in the European Museum of Modern Art, the National Gallery of Victoria, the National Portrait Gallery of Australia and many other collections.

== Books ==
=== As writer and illustrator ===
- Shoes News, Lothian, 2003
- Various Faerious, Lothian, 2002
- The Hush Treasure Book, Allen & Unwin, 2016 (Contributor)

=== As illustrator ===
- Nancy Bentleigh, Tracey Hawkins, New Frontier, 2010
- Molly's Memory Jar, Norma Spalding, New Frontier, 2010
- Thank You Wishes, Kate Wilson, JoJo Publishing, 2009
- A True Person, Marrian Gabbin, New Frontier, 2007
- Squeezy Cuddle Dangly Legs, Peter Whitfield, New Frontier, 2007
- Pemberthy Bear, Sally Murphy, New Frontier, 2005
- Wishes For One more Day, Melanie Joy Pastor, Flashlight Press, 2005
