= Jordan Gogos =

Australian fashion designer

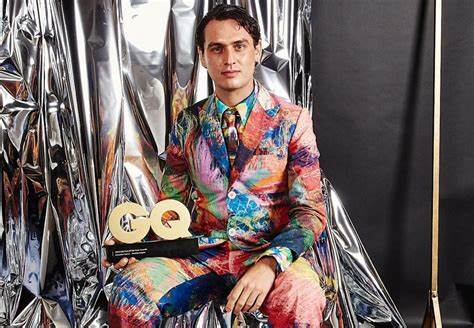
- Jordan Gogos at the GQ Men of the Year Awards, 2022
- Born: September 1994 (30 years old); Sydney, Australia
- Occupation(s): Fashion designer, artist
- Years active: 2021–present
- Website: https://www.iordanesspyridongogos.com

Jordan Gogos (born September 1994) is an Australian multidisciplinary artist and fashion designer for Iordanes Spyridon Gogos. Gogos founded the fashion label in 2019 with a focus on recycled and repurposed textiles and fabrics and has presented at Australian Fashion Week annually since 2021.

== Career ==
Gogos founded the fashion label Iordanes Spyridon Gogos in 2019 after working in New York on his furniture brand GOGOS and studying at Parsons School of Design. The label is known for being experimental, non-gendered and innovative in its approaches to sustainability through practice-led design research methodologies, and is notable for its 'wearables' which repurpose existing textiles and materials. Unlike many other Australian fashion labels, Iordanes Spyridon Gogos do not stock or sell their clothes in retail stores.

The label debuted at the 2021 Australian Fashion Week with over 25 different artists and collaborators to widespread acclaim. Since his debut, he has presented at Australian Fashion Week annually and was awarded Emerging Designer of the Year by the Australian Fashion Council.

In 2022, GQ Australia presented Gogos with the Creative Force Award at the Men of the Year awards for his designs. Gogos' first furniture based solo exhibition Absurd Curiosities was hosted by collectible-design gallery Sally Dan-Cuthbert later that year.

In 2023, Gogos presented at the annual Australian Fashion Laureate awards, and exhibited his textile art at Sydney Contemporary. Iordanes Spyridon Gogos then collaborated with Akira Isogawa on the label's first Resort collection at Australian Fashion Week.

In 2024, Gogos launched his collaboration with Designer Rugs at his fourth Resort runway Australian Fashion Week Show, The Woven Trojan Horse. The show included the return of Elaine George to the runway in decades and the collection received widespread acclaim. Gogos was then guest designer at Hautes Grecians, the sixth edition of Greece's haute couture event, and presented a new collection of Greek-inspired wearables.

Iordanes Spyridon Gogos partnered with Glenfiddich for the 2024 Melbourne Art Fair on a pop up bar. Gogos was an advocate for the continuation of Australian Fashion Week after IMG withdrew their support and was involved in lobbying for the Australian Fashion Council's continuation in the event into 2025.

His works appear in the National Gallery of Australia, Powerhouse Museum, Bendigo Art Gallery, The National Wool Museum and the Art Gallery of South Australia.

== Other ventures ==
Gogos was the subject of 2024 Archibald Prize portrait finalist Fluffy (Jordan Gogos) by Whitney Duan.

Gogos gave a presentation about sustainability and value at TEDx Sydney Youth conference titled "The art of the thingmabob".

He is a contributing writer to Vogue Australia and Harper's Bazaar.
