= Oliver Watts =

Australian artist

Oliver Watts is an Australian artist, lecturer and theorist.

== Biography ==
Watts was born in Sydney, New South Wales. He studied Arts and Law, gaining Honours, at Sydney University. In 2010, he received a PhD in Art History and Theory, the title of his thesis being "Images on the Limit of Law: Sovereignty, Modernism and the Effigy".

== Work ==
Watts works across a variety of media, ranging from performance art to painting and collage. His chief concern is the nexus of art and law, while his works are guided by the question "how do images command?". In a 2010 group exhibition, Triplicated, Watts demonstrated how the law is both desirable and desirous. He revisited the Brothers Grimm fairy tale of the princess and a mythical sea-hare. Through videos and collage Watts has illustrated and sophomorically obfuscated the story through a variety of methods from jokes to critical theory.

In his BarresTrial Series, Watts looks closely at a Dada performance of 1921 which aped the law. Tristan Tzara made trouble as a witness, with André Breton the judge, insisting that even a Dada law would be bogus. Watts channelled this nihilistic and absurdist spirit, after translating the testimony from the French and then performing it. His collages are based on this translation, which he also presented to the annual conference of the Association of Art Historians in Glasgow, Scotland, in 2010.

Watts has painted actress Eryn Jean Norvill many times, including an entry for the Archibald Prize in 2021, and she has featured in his video works.

== Academia ==
He is a lecturer of Art Theory at University of New South Wales and Sydney University.

== Exhibitions ==
Watts' solo exhibitions include The Golden Probe, Crimes Against Dada (Chalk Horse Gallery); Three Suns (Helen Gory Gallery, Melbourne); Smoking Guns (Cat Street Gallery, Hong Kong); Frontier Photobooth, (1/2 Doz. Festival); Pioneers (MOP Projects).

He has also exhibited in many group shows, including: Triplicated (Chalk Horse Gallery); ‘Driftwood’ (MOP Projects); Hairbrush (Wren Gallery, Sydney).

== Recognition and awards ==
- Mosman Art Prize (Finalist), 2005–06
- Helen Lempriere Travelling Scholarship (finalist), 2005
- Brett Whiteley Travelling Art Scholarship (finalist), 2004–05
- Dorian Gray (Eryn Jean Norvill), finalist for the 2021 Archibald Prize
- Last King of the Cross (John Ibrahim), finalist for the 2024 Archibald Prize

== Selected publications ==
Among his published works are:

- ‘Behind the Lines’
- Love, Life and Politics (National Museum of Australia)
