= Ed Le Brocq =

Australian musician and radio presenter

- Born: 1967 (age 58–59); Dover, England
- Occupations: Musician, broadcaster, teacher
- Known for: ABC Classic presenter
- Spouse: Carol "Charlie" Le Brocq (married 2022–present)

Ed Le Brocq, previously known as Emma, Ed or Eddie Ayres (/ɛərz/) (born 1967), is a musician, music teacher, radio presenter and writer. He is notable for his work on the Australian ABC Classic radio station, as well as for his numerous charitable efforts and memoirs about his transition as a transgender man.

== Early life and education ==
Born in Dover in 1967, Ayres grew up in Shrewsbury, in the county of Shropshire, England. He was two when his parents separated, leaving his mother, Anna, to bring up four children aged within four and a half years of one another, living in a small house. He has described one of his siblings as a difficult child, who ran away from home many times, and there were frequent family fights. He started to play the violin when he was eight years old, switching to viola when he was twelve. However the cello was his first love. Miserable in early adolescence, Ayres self-harmed.

He graduated from the Royal Northern College of Music in Manchester and did further studies at the Hochschule der Künste in Berlin, where he received a DAAD (German Academic Exchange Service) scholarship; at the Royal Academy in London, with the assistance of a Countess of Munster Musical Trust scholarship; and at the Victorian College of the Arts in Melbourne.

== Career ==
Ayres was a professional viola player for 12 years, including eight years performing with the Hong Kong Philharmonic Orchestra after moving there in 1992. In 2001, he began presenting the classical music breakfast show on the Radio Television Hong Kong (RTHK) station in Hong Kong.

Ayres moved from Hong Kong to Australia in February 2003, living in Melbourne and cycling to work each day.

From 4 February 2008, Ayres began presenting the Classic Breakfast program on ABC Classic FM. In the same year, he taught at the Melbourne Girls Grammar School and taught cello to a wide range of private students. In 2012 Ayres appeared on Big Ideas Talking with Andrew Schultz, composer and head of the school of Arts and the Media at UNSW, and music psychologist Emery Schubert, on insights into composition and emotional responses to music.

By 2014, he was living in the inner-west suburb of Glebe with a new partner in Sydney. His memoir, Cadence: Travels with music - a memoir, was published in May 2014.

On 30 June 2014, Ayres announced that he would be leaving at the end of the year. In July 2014, he appeared on the Musica Viva channel with an interview to camera: Chamber Music & Me. In October 2014, ABC FM radio's Classic Breakfast website announced that he had "chosen to hang up [his] headphones and move on to new adventures". after Ellen Fanning had been announced in September 2014 as temporary successor. Ayres later revealed that the real reason for his departure was that he was suffering from major depression at the time.

Lunchbox/Soapbox at the Wheeler Centre in Melbourne in January 2015 featured Ayres presenting The Viola: A big violin, a small cello, or just a joke? Later that year he moved to Kabul, where he began teaching violin, viola and cello at the Afghanistan National Institute of Music.

In 2016 he gave an extended interview on The Weekly with Charlie Pickering. He came out as transgender in that year.

In 2017, Ayres moved back to Australia, to Brisbane, where he taught cello, violin and viola. In October he spoke with Jon Faine at an event at the Wheeler Centre about his music and personal life and his 2017 book Danger Music. From December 2017, when it was created as The Art Hub, until mid-January 2020 (after renaming as The Art Show), Ayres presented an hour-long program on Radio National about art. Ayres had developed an interest in art after learning about it from his brother, Tim, an artist.

He appeared at both Adelaide Writers' Week and Sydney Writers' Festival in 2018.

In 2019, Ayres returned to ABC Classic to present Weekend Breakfast.

== Other roles ==
Ayres has been involved in a number of charitable efforts. In 2000, he raised money by making a twelve-month cycling trip from Shropshire in England to Hong Kong. In 2011 he busked in Hyde Park, Sydney, to raise money for the victims of the floods in Queensland.

In 2017 Ayres narrated "Not Quite the Night Before Christmas" as part of a live performance with a capella group The Idea of North and the Melbourne Symphony Orchestra, which was made into an album called A World of Christmas.

He was on the board of Green Music Australia, retiring in 2018.

Ayres has been involved in the Melbourne-based charity Hush Foundation, which uses the arts to improve young patients' lives in hospitals.

== Personal life and family ==
Ayres has a brother, Tim Ayres, an artist who as of 2019 lives and works in the Netherlands, and whose work is held in the Stedelijk Museum in Amsterdam, the New York Public Library, and by members of the Dutch royal family. He also has two sisters, Liz and Penny.

Ayres received Australian citizenship in 2010.

A friend of Ayres, Carol "Charlie" Le Brocq, offered assistance and support during his gender transition in 2016, and they subsequently fell in love and became partners. They married in February 2022, and Ed took her surname.

Artist Jaq Grantford asked Le Brocq's permission to paint a portrait of him, and he requested to be represented as a centaur. This related to the story of Chiron in Greek mythology, who was a teacher and mentor to many Greek heroes, and spurned violence in favour of wisdom and intellect. It is also a personal nickname used by his wife, which symbolises his "acceptance of his true self". The painting, called I Am a Centaur, was selected as a 2024 Archibald Prize finalist. One of Grantford's children is transgender, so she saw the painting as a way to support her child and the transgender community as well.

=== Gender transition ===
Ayres wrote about gender in his 2014 memoir, Cadence: Travels with music - a memoir, narrating his experiences of being thought of as a man during his bicycle travels in countries such as Pakistan.

In an interview published in the Sydney Morning Herald in 2016, Ayres came out as a transgender man. He said that he had first realised he was a man during a cycling trip in Pakistan in 2013 in a "total beam of light" moment one evening while watching the film Boys Don't Cry. He said, "I've waited a long time to do this. I suppressed this for so long, now I feel I can't wait. " He transitioned just before his 50th birthday.

In a 2018 interview, Ayres said "there's no medical proof of this, really, but I believe that I am male and that my body doesn't represent what I see myself as being. I have always felt in some sort of corner of my being that something wasn't quite right ... Realising you're transgender, for me, was utterly, utterly devastating." He had thought that as a female he was a lesbian, but his partners at the time had refused to stay with him if he transitioned.

=== Names ===
Le Brocq was born Emma Ayres. He styled himself Eddie Ayres after his transition but more recently, and as author of his 2021 book Whole Notes, was known as Ed Ayres. His full name is Eadric, taken from Eadric the Wild, a resistance fighter in Shropshire after the Norman Conquest in 1066.

He changed his name to Ed Le Brocq when he married in 2022.

== Books ==
=== Cadence: Travels with music – a memoir ===
Cadence (2014) is an autobiographical story of Ayres's life and thoughts during his bicycle travels. It tells the story of Ayres, then named Emma, cycling his way from England to Hong Kong with a violin strapped to his back. It is also a journey through the music that inspired his own musical works. It was during this time that Ayres realised that he was a transgender man, while watching the film Boys Don't Cry.

=== Danger Music ===
Danger Music (2017) is an autobiographical account dealing with Ayres's experiences and feelings during his time from early 2015 at Afghanistan's National Institute of Music in Kabul, leading up to his decision to fully transition to male gender. By early 2016 at the age of 49, he had received a double mastectomy. In his last three months in Afghanistan, after he returned from his mastectomy, he began living as a man, riding motorcycles around Kabul wearing blue jeans and a black leather jacket over a white T-shirt. The book ends back in Australia with Eddie's first testosterone injection to initiate the chemical change to a man.

Danger Music was launched in Brisbane at the Avid Reader bookshop in West End on 27 September 2017. On 17 November he appeared at Avid Reader's first Summer Reading Guide launch of the 2017 season with author Robert Whyte in presentations followed by a joint discussion. Ayres wrote about Danger Music for The Guardian; "Moving to a war zone was better than living with what was in my head" appeared on Sunday 24 September 2017, essentially an excerpt from the book (p. 5).

=== Sonam and the Silence ===
Sonam and the Silence (2018) is a children's book, inspired by Ayres's experiences while teaching music in Afghanistan. It is about a young girl living in Afghanistan when ruled by the Taliban, who forbade music, and her discovery of the power of music. Illustrated by Iranian-Australian artist Ronak Taher, it was shortlisted for the 2019 Prime Minister's Literary Award.

=== Whole Notes ===
Whole Notes (2021) is a follow-up to Danger Music, and about music and identity. One critic described it as "...a compendious love letter to music, the viola (Ayres’ first love) and musical education". In it, he describes how he found the bravery to transition through the power of music. Whole Notes was shortlisted for the 2022 nonfiction Age Book of the Year.
