= Oliver Tank =

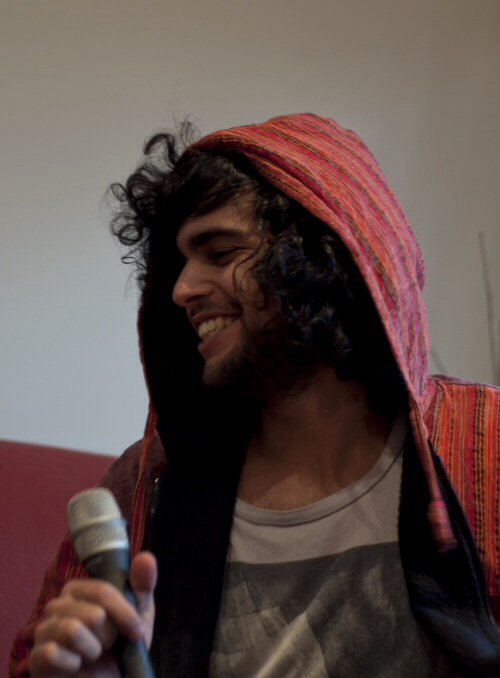

Background information
- Origin: Sydney, Australia
- Genres: Electronic
- Years active: 2011–present
- Label: Yes Please Records
- Website: Oliver Tank

Oliver Tank is a musician from Sydney. Tank's music has been compared to Bon Iver and James Blake and he lists Nosaj Thing, Boards of Canada and Jon Hopkins as musical inspirations. Tank's music was first issued via SoundCloud in early to mid-2011. In September 2011, he won the 2011 Northern Lights Competition held by FBi Radio in Sydney, along with Rainbow Chan, to attend and perform at the Iceland Airwaves Festival in Reykjavík in October 2011, his first overseas performance. Tank's first EP, Dreams, was released on 21 November 2011 by Yes Please Records with fans being able to choose their file format and name their price.

In an interview with SunsetInTheRearview.com, Tank described how "Last Night I Heard Everything In Slow Motion" was a university assignment and that the song is about "being unsure about something to the extent that it plagues and consumes you." Regarding, "The Last Time", Tank explained, "This track's about when you're with someone you really care about and it all sort of falls apart. You replay those last moments over and over again in your head. It consumes you. Although at the same time it's kind of liberating and inspiring."

In 2011, an edited version of Tank's "Last Night I Heard Everything In Slow Motion" was used in a Marriage Equality advertisement, It's Time, put together by the organisation GetUp!.

"Last Night I Heard Everything In Slow Motion" was used in a trailer for the open-world driving game, The Crew, at the E3 2014 computer and video games trade fair at the Los Angeles Convention Centre.

== Dreams EP ==
Title	Details
Dreams	Release date: 21 November 2011; Label: Yes Please Records; Formats: CD, music download

== Awards ==
=== AIR Awards ===
The Australian Independent Record Awards (commonly known informally as AIR Awards) is an annual awards night to recognise, promote and celebrate the success of Australia's Independent Music sector.

Year	Nominee / work	Award	Result
2012	Dreams	Best Independent Dance/Electronic Album	Nominated
