= Rainbow Chan =

Australian singer and artist (born 1990)

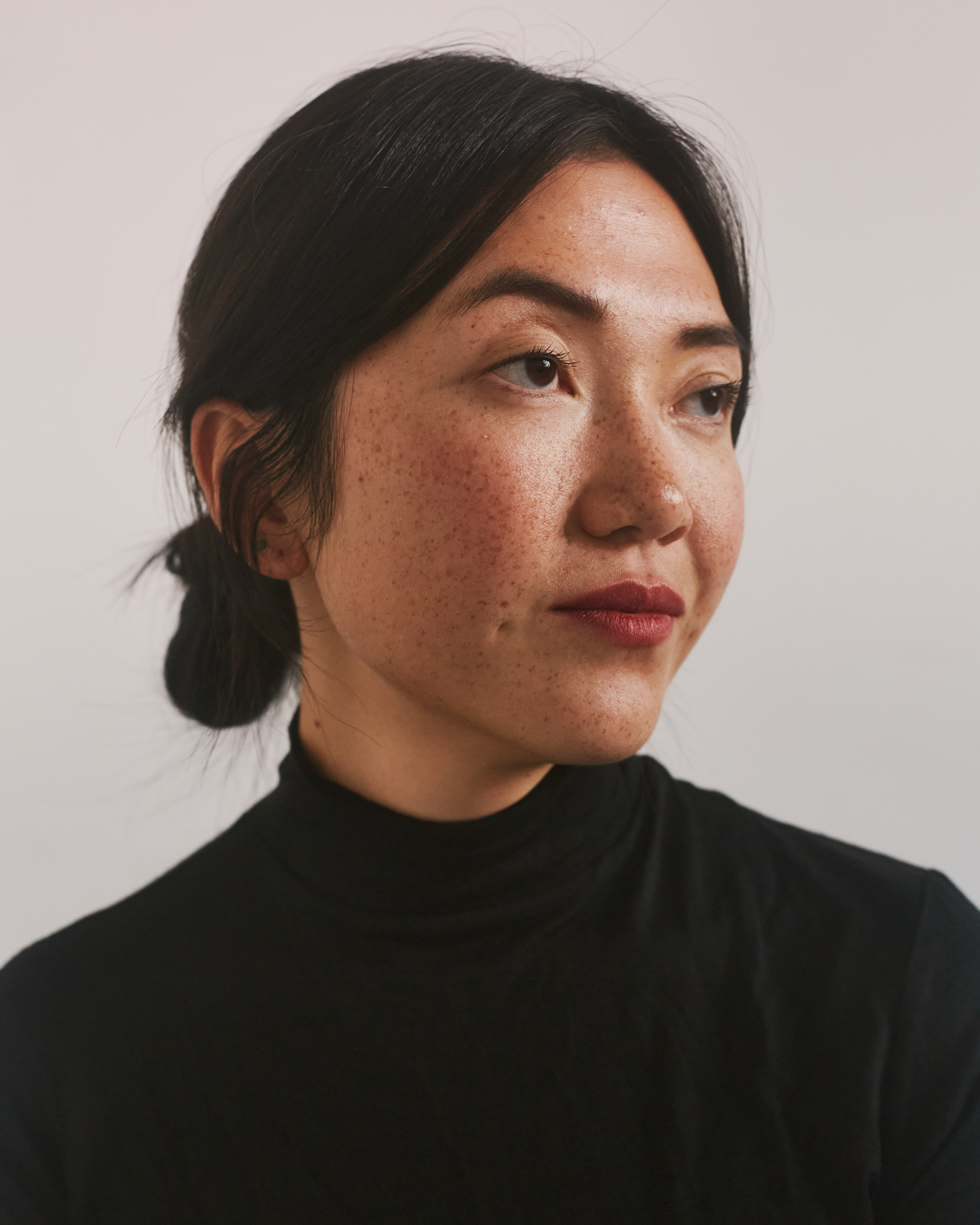
- Rainbow Chan in 2025
- Born: March 1990 (35 years old); Hong Kong
- Occupation(s): Vocalist, producer, artist
- Years active: 2012–present
- Website: https://www.chunyinrainbowchan.com/

Chun Yin Rainbow Chan 陳雋然 (born March 1990), known professionally as Rainbow Chan, is a Hong Kong-born, Australian vocalist, music producer, multi-instrumentalist, and visual artist. After winning FBi Radio's Northern Lights Competition in 2011, Chan rose to prominence in Sydney's electronic music scene and is considered one of the most innovative musical artists in Australia. Chan's works often explore themes of diaspora, creative mistranslations and matrilineal histories. Her creative output is expansive and comprises experimental pop music, performance, silk painting and installation.

== Career ==
=== 2011–2020 ===
In 2011, Chan won FBi Radio's Northern Lights Competition, which saw her travel to Reykjavík and perform at Iceland Airwaves. She collaborated with Oliver Tank and Icelandic musicians, Just Another Snake Cult and Pétur Ben, to produce The Northern Lights EP, which was digitally released by FBi Radio in 2012.

In 2016, her debut record Spacings was released. Spacings centered on the breakdown of Chan's relationship and her experience with love. The album received widespread acclaim. She was nominated for FBi Radio Award for Best Live Act and Record of the Year. Chan was FBi Radio's most played artist that year with her song 'Nest'. 'Spacings' was nominated for FBi SMAC Record of the Year and AIR Best Dance/Electronica Album. In 2017, her single 'Let Me' from her EP Fabrica won the FBi Award for Best Song.

Chan composed the score for ABC documentary The Glass Bedroom and live score for Art Gallery of New South Wales's Starburst: Chinese Film Season in 2018.

In 2019, Chan's sophomore album Pillar was released, blending experimental pop with her electronic music. The album centered on themes of the physical body and emotional mental state, a departure from Chan's love songs. It was nominated for the Australian Music Prize.

=== 2020 – present ===
In 2020, Chan moved into gallery and museum contexts through her visual arts practice which combines silk paintings, textiles, weavings, embroidery, music and performance. Chan's installations have been exhibited with Firstdraft Gallery, Liquid Architecture, 4A Centre for Contemporary Asian Art, Museum of Contemporary Art Australia, and Longli International New Media Arts Festival, China.

She has performed at the Sydney Opera House, Gallery of Modern Art, Art Gallery of New South Wales, Museum of Old and New Art, Iceland Airwaves and National Taiwan Museum of Fine Arts.

In 2021, Songs from a Walled Village, her documentary for ABC Radio National, was a finalist in the 2021 Asia-Pacific Broadcasting Union Prizes. She was a finalist in the 2021/22 NSW Visual Arts Emerging Fellowship (Artspace, Create NSW and NAS), where she produced an immersive installation titled Fruit Song 生果文. Drawing upon a Weitou bridal lament that uses fruit metaphors, Chan combined silk paintings, embroidery, text and audio into a large-scale installation. Fruit Song 生果文 was acquired by Art Gallery of New South Wales in 2023.

In 2022, Chan was recognised in the "40 Under 40: Most Influential Asian Australians Award" for her contribution to arts and culture. That year, she won Artist of the Year in the 2022 FBi SMAC Awards.

In 2023, Chan debuted her theatrical performance The Bridal Lament, which interweaves storytelling, cultural research, history, and research into a musical performance on stage. The 'song cycle' is known for its use of Weitou language and cultural traditions, whilst featuring new songs written by Chan. Chan brings to life intergenerational and cross-cultural perspectives on diasporic experiences and the complex history of Hong Kong. The Bridal Lament's success has seen it tour nationally into 2025.

In 2024, Chan's work Long Distance Call (長途電話) was selected to be a part of Museum of Contemporary Art Australia's annual exhibition, Primavera 2024: Young Australia Artists.

In 2025, Chan was the subject of 2025 Archibald Prize portrait finalist Banquet (Rainbow Chan) by Whitney Duan.

== Personal life ==
Chan was born in Hong Kong and came to Australia when she was six. Her maternal heritage is of Weitou descent, one of the first settlers in Hong Kong. She began to learn the Weitou language in 2017 and has since performed in the language internationally.

Chan completed her Bachelor of Arts in English and Music at Honours at the University of Sydney and received her Master of Fine Arts from the University of New South Wales.

Chan is a passionate mentor in electronic music and teaches into Contemporary Music Practice at Sydney Conservatorium. She plays saxophone, guitar and piano. Her influences include FKA Twigs, Teresa Teng, Yellow Magic Orchestra and Björk.
