= European Museum of Modern Art =

Coordinates: 41.3850°N 2.1803°E

- Museu Europeu d'Art Modern
- Location: Barcelona, Spain
- Type: Art museum
- Collections: Contemporary figurative art

The European Museum of Modern Art (Catalan: Museu Europeu d'Art Modern) (MEAM) opened its doors in the Ribera neighborhood Ribera neighborhood of Barcelona, near Museu Picasso, becoming the first museum of contemporary figurative art in Spain. Its director was the Barcelona architect, writer and editor José Manuel Infiesta, a former member of the neonazi group Cercle Espanyol d'Amics d'Europa (CEDADE).

== Building ==
The museum is located in the Palau Gomis, at the junction of Montcada, Princesa and Barra de Ferro streets, in the Ribera neighborhood of Barcelona. This 18th-century building, with three floors, has a noble courtyard with a stone staircase.
