= University of Sydney Union =

Student services provider

University of Sydney Union (USU)
- Motto: The Heart of Uni Life
- Institution: University of Sydney
- Location: Sydney, Australia
- Established: 1874
- Executive officers: President: Archie Wolifson; Vice-President: Layla Wang; Honorary Treasurer: Noah Rancan; Honorary Secretary: Sally Liu
- Members: 50,000+
- Affiliations: University of Sydney Students' Representative Council, Sydney University Postgraduate Representative Association
- Website: usu.edu.au

The University of Sydney Union (USU) is Australia's largest independent student-led member organisation located at University of Sydney in Camperdown, New South Wales, Australia.

The current iteration of USU formed in 1972, as an amalgamation of Sydney University Union (SUU), established in 1874 as a debating society, and Sydney University Women's Union (SUWU), founded in 1914.

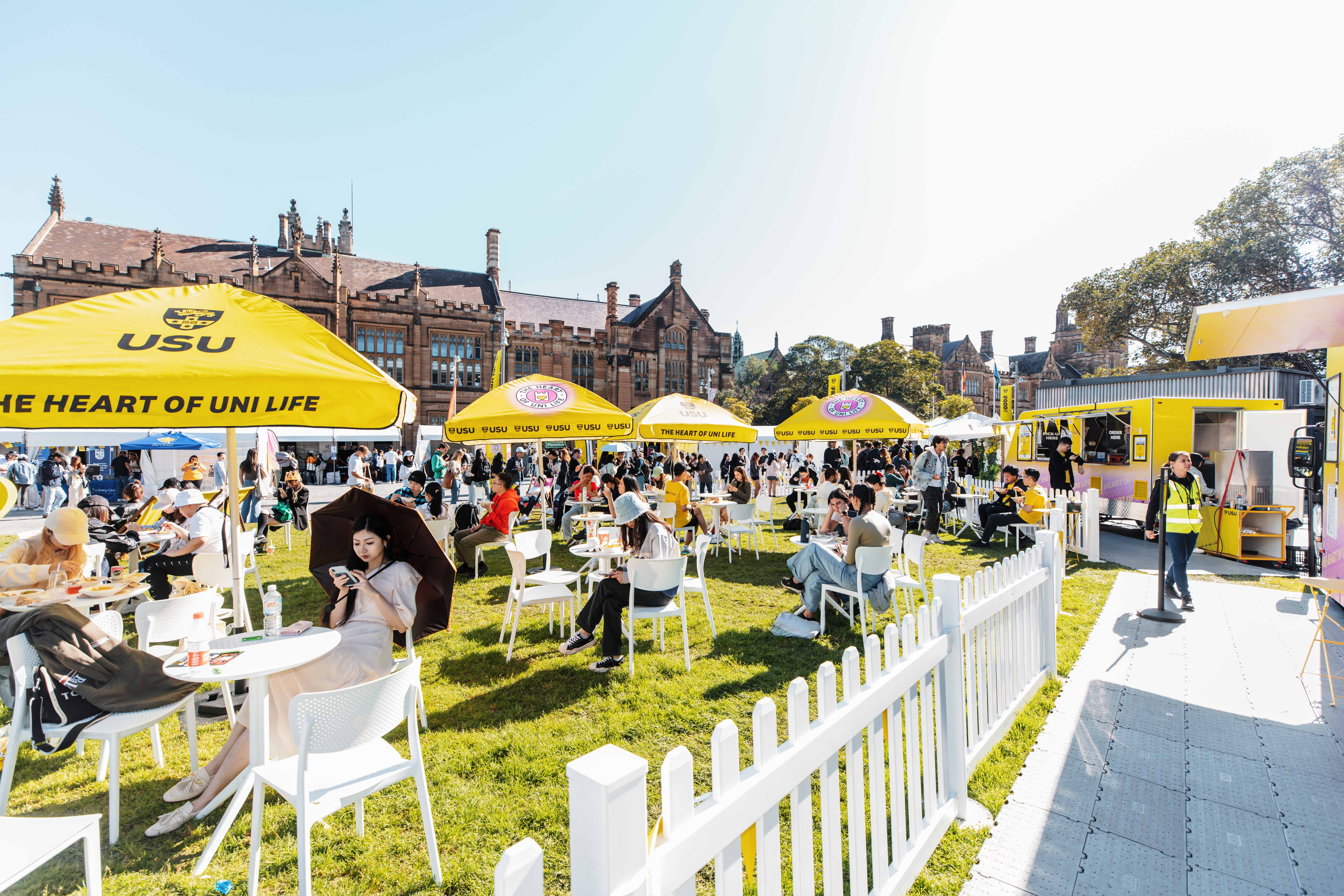
USU's Welcome Festival

USU is a non-profit entity that provides student services and programs including over 200 clubs & societies, a world-class debating team, volunteer program, and events including the biggest orientation festival in Australia, Welcome Fest. It supports its Members through free food initiatives and by providing safe spaces on campus.

The organisation operates three buildings located at the Camperdown/Darlington campus, comprising student, public and commercial spaces - Holme Building, Manning House and Wentworth Building.

USU also owns and operates Manning Bar, Hermann's Bar, Verge Gallery and HostCo, a catering and events company.

== Clubs & societies ==
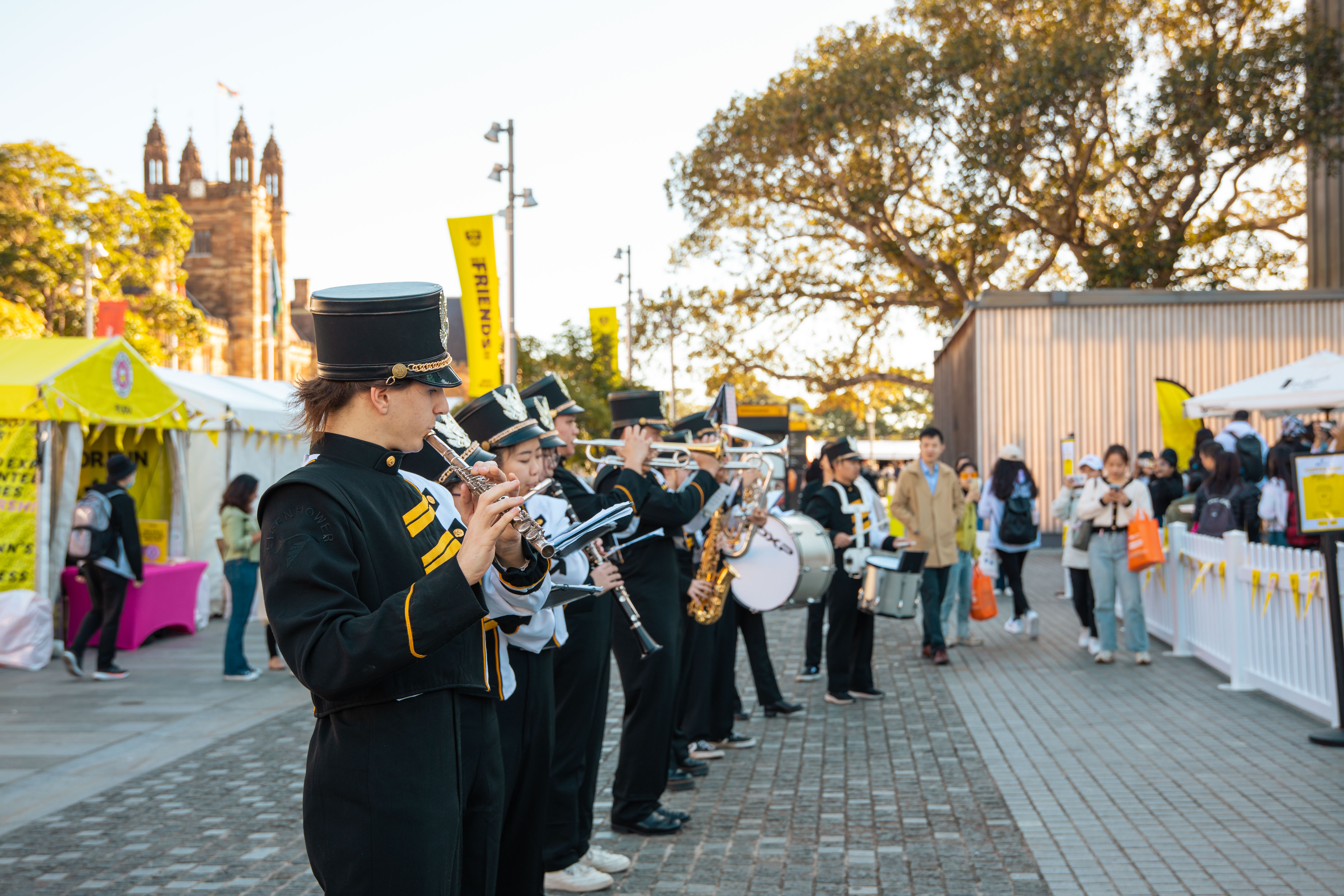
Sydney University Marching Band Association (SUMBA) performing at Welcome Fest in 2023

Since 2001, USU has supported and managed a significant number of University of Sydney clubs and societies. They broadly fall into the following categories: Academic, Art, Music & Performance, Culture & Language, Faith & Religion, Hobbies & Special Interest, Political, Professional, Social Impact & Advocacy, and Social Sport & Recreation.

USU includes some of the oldest university clubs in Australia, including Sydney University Medical Society (1886) and Sydney University Dramatic Society or 'SUDS' (1889). The Sydney University Labor Club (1925) is the oldest political campus club in Australia.

=== Revues ===
University of Sydney Revues are student-run comedy revues that began at the University of Sydney in the 1960s. Revues have been financially supported by USU over the past three decades, usually tied to a faculty or cultural identity group.

== History ==
The Sydney University Union (SUU) was established in 1874 for debating, at a time when the university had fewer than a hundred students; graduates and staff were thus dominant. In 1884, the university's Senate provided a common room for the union, and in 1906, it decided to provide a building for the union's use. This building is now known as the Holme Building. Holme contains a large Refectory, historically a dining hall and now a function space. The interior is decorated with three murals by the artist Virgil Lo Schiavo: the Sulman-Prize-winning Tribute to Shakespeare (1945), the Sulman-Prize finalist Characters from Dickens (1951), and in the main hall, Mankind (1970).

Holme Building

A separate Sydney University Women's Union (SUWU) was formed in 1914. The Senate also agreed to fund a building for the Women's Union; Manning House was opened in 1917, named after William Montagu Manning. It was at this time that the university made membership of one of the two Unions compulsory.

Until the 1970s, the Unions' headquarters were an important meeting place for staff and students; however, with the establishment of a University of Sydney staff club and the growth in size of the university population, the influence of staff in the activities of the Student Union decreased. The amalgamation of the two student unions came after the decision in 1971 to jointly fund the construction of the Wentworth Building, named after William Wentworth, one of the leading figures in the colony of New South Wales. The two unions amalgamated on 1 January 1972 to form the University of Sydney Union (USU).

Since Voluntary student unionism was enacted in 2006, USU membership has been voluntary. Membership is currently free for all current students of the University of Sydney.

== The USU today ==
The USU operates numerous programs for its 42,000+ members, from facilities located in three main buildings, Manning House, and the Wentworth and the Holme Building. These buildings house the large proportion of the university's catering outlets, and provide space for retail outlets, an art gallery, meeting rooms, game rooms, bars, cafes, restaurants and function centres. One of the more prominent activities organised by the union is the Welcome Festival. In 2019, following the Broderick Review, the USU and University made the decision to rebrand the festival from "Orientation Week (OWeek)" as "Welcome Week", and later "Welcome Fest". The festival centres on stalls set up by clubs and societies along Eastern Avenue, the main university thoroughfare, and events and entertainment at the beginning of the semester each year to welcome new students to university. The USU Clubs program is a key part of the USU's activities, with over two hundred clubs to cater for the university's diverse student population.

Manning Bar, on the top floor of Manning House, has been a major part of Sydney's live music scene. It hosts the Sydney Uni Band Comp, launching the careers of The Jezabels, The Laurels, and Cloud Control. In February 2020 it was announced that Manning Bar would no longer trade during daytime hours, but would remain active as a music venue. This decision was reversed in 2023.

The union also has an extensive art collection, and until 2006, it maintained the Sir Hermann Black Gallery. In July 2009, the Verge Gallery opened in the Jane Foss Russell Plaza as a new student art space on main campus.

The USU founded the award-winning startup accelerator and entrepreneur program, INCUBATE.

Today, the union is operated as a non-profit membership organisation, with a board of directors elected by the students at the university. Consisting of 14 members, the board is composed of:

- 11 directors elected for overlapping two year terms by members of the union, with 5 elected in even-numbered years and 6 elected in odd-numbered years;
- 2 directors appointed by the University of Sydney Senate; and
- The immediate past president, who is non-voting.

== Debating ==
A USU team has won the 2015, 2017, 2019 and 2026 editions of the World Universities Debating Championship and the 2015, 2022, 2023 and 2024 editions of the Australasian Intervarsity Debating Championship. with both the 2022 and 2023 winners defeating another USU team in the semi-final to reach the championship. In 2014, the Mandarin debates team won the Fourth Australian Mandarin Debating Championship, and placed second in the prestigious International Chinese Debating Competition in Beijing. The USU team captain was also awarded the top prize in the individual competition.

A debater from the USU has held the title of best speaker in Australasia for three consecutive years, these being 2021-2023 . The Best Speaker at the 2014 World Universities Debating Championship was also a USU debater, and in 2019 the same award was bestowed on a USU debater.

== Student media ==
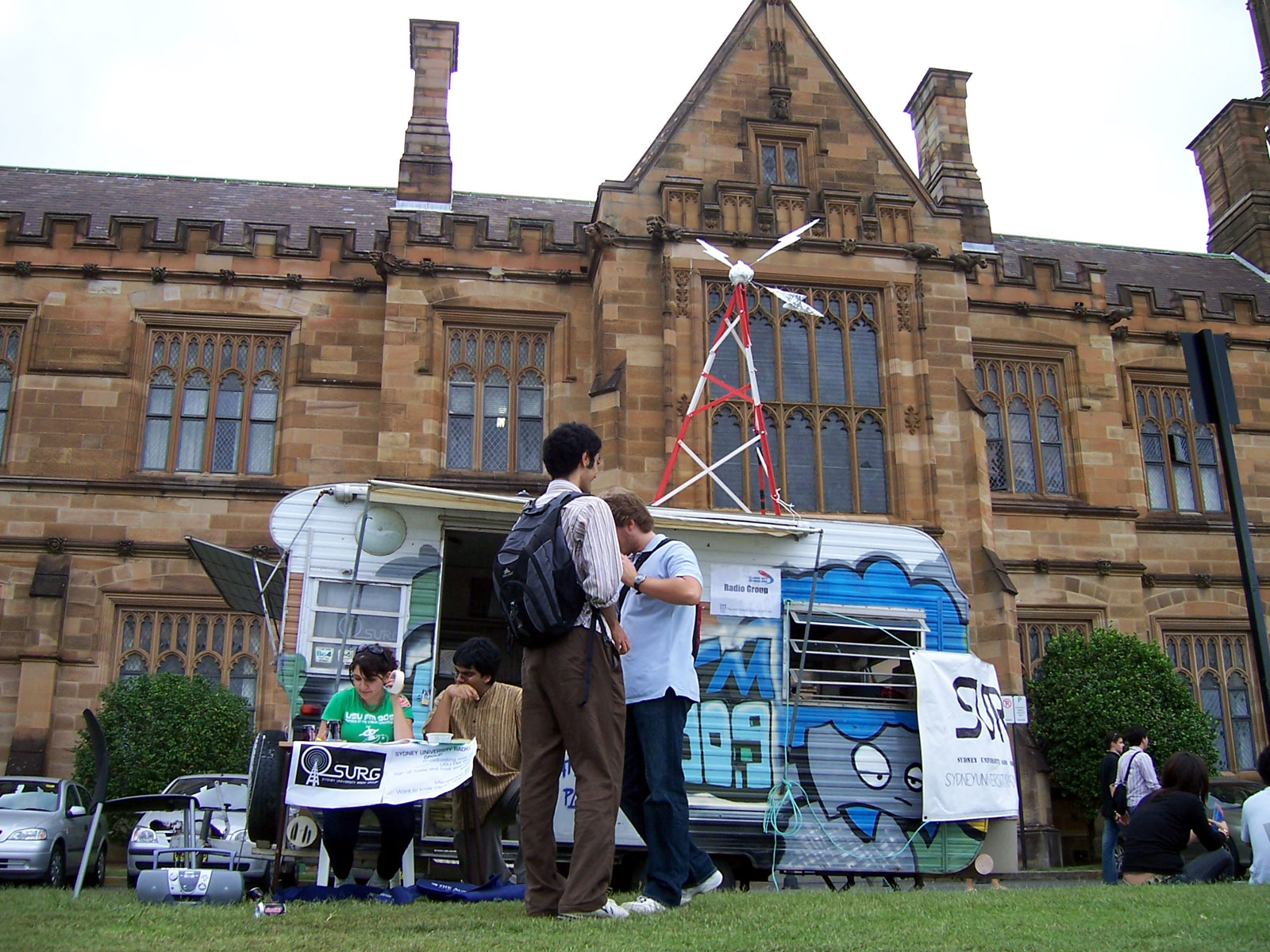
Sydney University Radio Group stall at Orientation Week

There are a number of publications on campus supported by the USU. The University of Sydney Union's literary magazine Hermes was first published in 1886 and is the oldest journal in Australia. Distinguished former editors have included Thomas Bavin (1874), H. V. Evatt, John Le Gay Brereton, James McAuley (1937), Jock Marshall (1941), and a duo of Les Murray and Geoffrey Lehmann in 1962.

Arna is also an annual literary journal published by the University of Sydney Arts Student Society. First published in 1918, it was disbanded in 1974. It was relaunched as Arna in 2008 by Rebecca Santos and Khym Scott, alongside the revival of the Sydney Arts Students' Society. The journal contains creatives pieces as written and edited by students.

Student publication the Union Recorder was first published in 1921, showcasing writing from University of Sydney students. The Bull, formerly The Bulletin, was a daily print outlining the events of the day on campus, which had been since rebranded BULL Magazine, which is edited and written by students. In recent years, the Recorder became a monthly publication; however, due to rationalisation in the face of VSU, it was announced in the November 2005 issue that it would become an annual publication as of 2006, with BULL Magazine taking its place as the primary repository of student content to be published monthly. In 2015, it was announced that BULL Magazine will be re-launched as an online only site for student created news and content.

Since its creation at the start of 2016, PULP Media, successor to BULL Magazine has boasted a number of successful breaking news pieces, such as editor Aparna Balakumar's "Rackweb". PULP has been distributed as a print magazine since 2022.

== Past Executives ==
List of Past Executives
Year	President	Vice-President	Honorary Treasurer	Honorary Secretary
2005-2006	Amit Singh	Jennifer Williams	Rebecca Mann	Katy Fernandez
2006-2007	Katy Fernandez	Lauren Hendry Parsons	James Hoare	Rose Khalilizadeh
2007-2008	Rose Khalilizadeh	Roslyn Stein	Tom Kavanagh	Mark Tanner
2008-2009	Ruchir Punjabi	Alice Dixon	Justin Hancock	Vyvyan Nickels
2009-2010	Patrick Bateman	Courtney Tight	Douglas Thompsone	Giorgia Rossi
2010-2011	David Mann	Melissa Brooks	Giorgia Rossi	Sibella Matthews
2011-2012	Sibella Matthews	Zachary Thompson	Ben Tang	Jacqui Munro
2012-2013	Astha Rajvanshi	Brigid Dixon	Rhys Pogopooski	Zachary Thompson
2013-2014	Hannah Morris	Tom Raue	Sophie Stanton	John Harding-Easson
2014-2015	Tara Waniganayaka	Bebe D'Souza	Robby Magyar	Eve Radunz
2015-2016	Alisha Aitken-Radburn	Liv Ronan	Edward McMahon	Shannen Potter
2016-2017	Michael Rees	Atia Rahim	Tiffany Alexander	Shannen Potter
2017-2018	Courtney Thompson	Esther Shim	Koko (Yifan) Kong	Grace Franki
2018-2019	Liliana Tai	Adam Torres	Claudia Gulbransen-Diaz	Zhixian Wang
2019-2020	Connor Wherrett	Lachlan Finch	Maya Eswaran	Decheng Sun
2020-2021	Irene Ruolin Ma	Nicholas Forbutt	Caitlin Brown	Yifeng Shen
2021-2022	Prudence Wilkins-Wheat	Ruby Lotz	Benjamin Hines	Belinda Thomas
2022-2023	Cole Scott-Curwood	Telita Goile	David Zhu	Isla Mowbray
2023-2024	Nazanin Sharifi	Madhullikaa Singh	Nicholas Dower	Onor Nottle
2024-2025	Bryson Constable	Benjamin Hines	James Dwyer	Julia Lim
2025-2026	Phan Vu	Georgia Zhang	James Dwyer	Ethan Floyd (until March 2026); Shirley Zhang
2026-2027	Archie Wolifson	Layla Wang	Noah Rancan	Sally Liu

== Notable alumni ==
Notable past Presidents & Board Directors of the University of Sydney Union include:

- Edmund Barton (1884–1885), Australian politician and judge, was the first Prime Minister of Australia and a founding justice of the High Court of Australia.
- H.V. Evatt (1916–1917), Australian jurist, politician and writer.
- The Hon. Michael Kirby AC CMG (President, 1964–1965), former justice of the High Court of Australia.
- Malcolm Turnbull (Board Director, 1975–1976), 29th Prime Minister of Australia.
- Judith Whelan (President, 1983–1984), former editor of the Sydney Morning Herald and ABC executive.
- Adam Spencer (President, 1991–1992) Australian radio presenter.

== See also ==
- University of Sydney Students' Representative Council
