= Arna (publication) =

- Editors: Kate Scott and Jenna Lorge
- Categories: Literature, art
- Frequency: Annually
- Publisher: Sydney Arts Students Society (provided by the University of Sydney Union)
- Founded: 1918
- Country: Australia
- Based in: Sydney
- Language: English
- Website: www.arnajournal.com

Arna, commonly styled as ARNA, is an annual literary journal published by the University of Sydney Arts Students Society. Originally named The Arts Journal of the University of Sydney, it was published regularly between 1918 and 1974 under the auspices of the Faculty of Arts and in 1938 the journal was renamed The ARNA: The Journal of the Arts Society. Publishing of the journal ceased unexpectedly in 1974.

After a hiatus of 34 years, publication recommenced in 2008 with the revival of the Sydney Arts Students' Society. Former distinguished editors and contributors include Samuel Beckett, Robert Hughes, Clive James, Lex Banning, Harold Stewart, Geoffrey Lehmann, Les Murray and Whitney Duan. The editors-in-chief for 2020 are Kate Scott and Jenna Lorge.

== Content ==
The journal includes predominantly prose fiction, poetry, and visual art. Since 2008, more varied forms have appeared in the journal including radio scripts, photography, and academic essays.

== Editorship ==
The editors-in-chief of Arna hold dual roles, also performing duties as Publications Officer in the Sydney Arts Students Society and are elected to the role in the Annual General Meeting held at the conclusion of the academic year alongside the other positions on the society's executive. This has attracted controversy in the past as elected editors are chosen in a popular election rather than for experience with the journal.

== Past editors ==
- 2021: Jenna Lorge and Thomas Israel
- 2020: Kate Scott and Jenna Lorge
- 2019: Nikole Evans and Doris Prodanovic
- 2018: Alisha Brown and Robin Eames
- 2017: Izabella Antoniou and Jack Gibson
- 2016: Eden Caceda and Lamya Rahman
- 2015: Whitney Duan and Tahlia Pajaczkowska-Russell
- 2014: Nick Fahy and Madeleine Konstantinidis
- 2013: Lane Sainty and Alberta McKenzie
- 2012: Alex McKinnon and Eleanor Gordon-Smith
- 2011: Anne Widjaja and Richard Withers
- 2010: Paul Ellis and Julian Larnach
- 2009: Callie Henderson and Nancy Lee
- 2008: Rebecca Santos and Khym Scott
