= Whitney Duan =

Australian artist

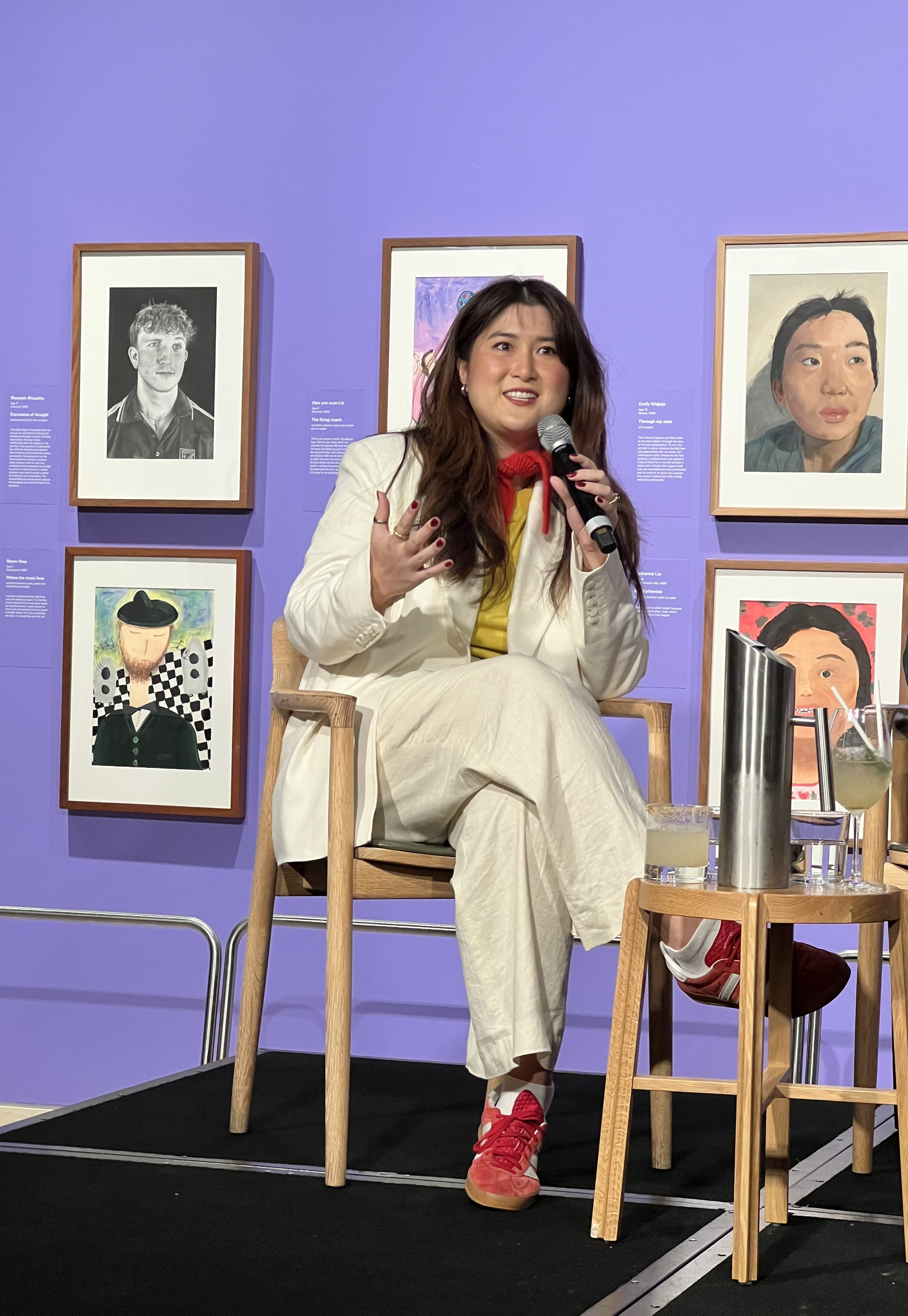
- Whitney Duan at the Art Gallery of NSW, 2025
- Born: November 1994 (age 31); Sydney, Australia
- Education: University of Sydney
- Known for: Portrait painting
- Website: whitneyduan.com

Whitney Duan is an Australian visual artist and multiple Archibald Prize finalist. Duan is known for her portraits which typically feature unusual textures including sand and polymer paint on reclaimed canvases.

== Early life and education ==
Whitney Duan was born in Sydney to Chinese migrants. She completed high school at Ravenswood School for Girls before attending the University of Sydney, majoring in art history in 2013.

At the University of Sydney, Duan held a number of editor roles: as editor of Hermes in 2014, editor of Arna in 2015, and editor for student publication Pulp in 2016.

== Career ==
Duan's work often encompasses still life, landscapes, and portraiture. Many of her works include textural elements and inclusions.

In 2024, Duan was a finalist in the Archibald Prize with a portrait of fashion designer Jordan Gogos, entitled Fluffy (Jordan Gogos). The work was known for its use of polymer paint to emphasize the textural strokes of Gogos’ work. The painting received mixed reviews.

In 2025, Duan was a finalist in the Archibald Prize with her portrait of singer and artist Rainbow Chan, entitled Banquet (Rainbow Chan). This work featured gold leaf and sand mixed with oil paints on the canvas and received a positive reception upon exhibiting.

== Personal life ==
Duan married writer Eden Caceda in Tuscany, Italy in June 2024. She lives between Sydney, Australia and London, United Kingdom.
