= Peaked cap =

Type of headwear

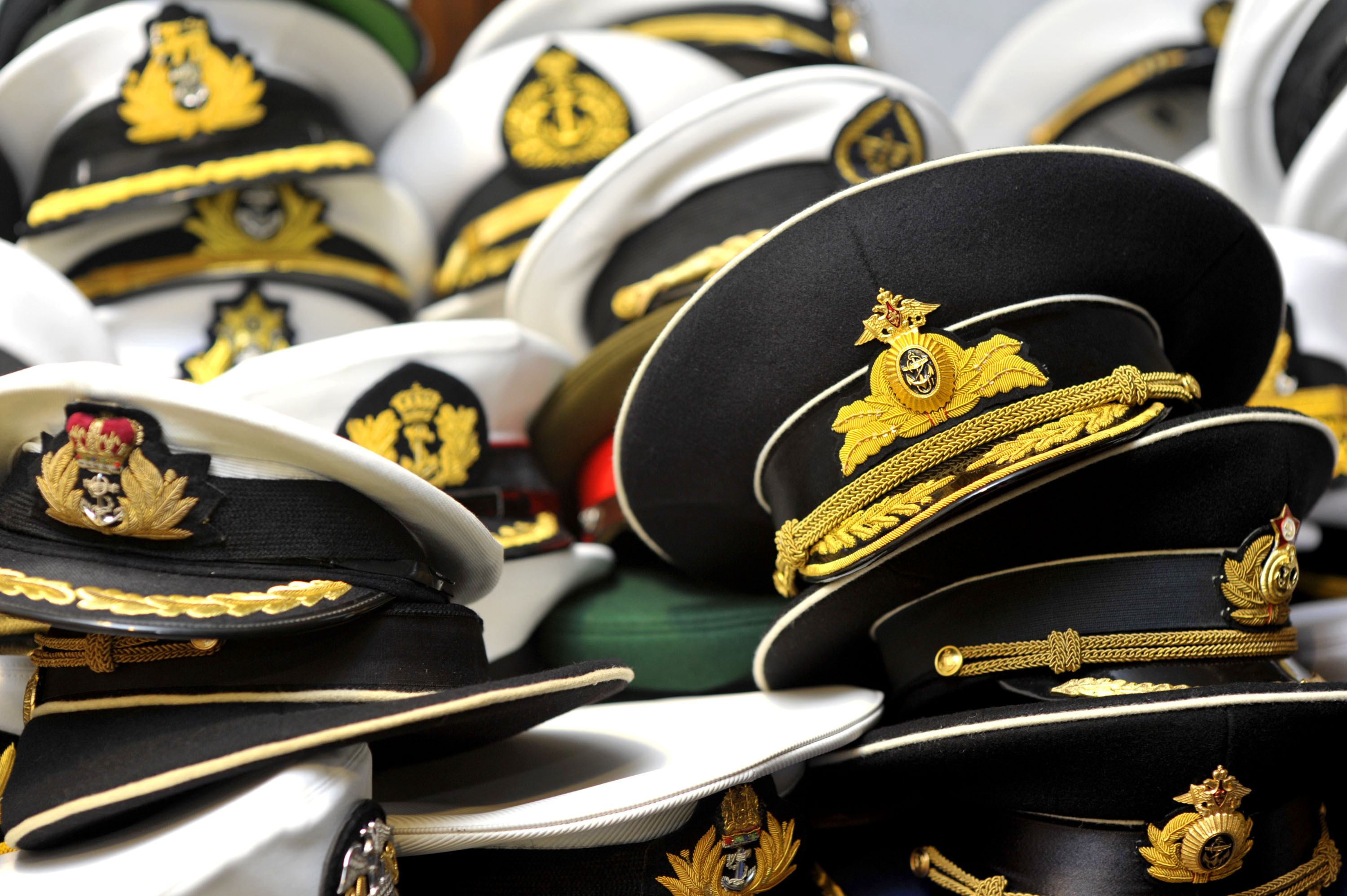
An assortment of peaked caps from several naval and maritime forces

A peaked cap, peaked hat, service cap, barracks cover, forage cap, or combination cap is a form of headgear worn by the armed forces of many nations, as well as many uniformed civilian organisations such as law enforcement agencies and fire departments. It derives its name from its short visor, or peak, which was historically made of polished leather but increasingly is made of a cheaper synthetic substitute.

The term forage cap is also used, although that also applies to the "field service cap" or the side cap.

Other principal components are the crown, band, and insignia, typically a cap badge and embroidery in proportion to rank. Piping is also often used, typically in contrast to the crown colour, which is usually white for navy, blue for air force, and green for army. The band is typically a dark, contrasting colour, often black, but may be patterned or striped.

In the British Army, each regiment and corps has a different badge. In the United States Armed Forces, the cap device is uniform throughout every service branch, although different variants are used by different rank classes.

== History ==
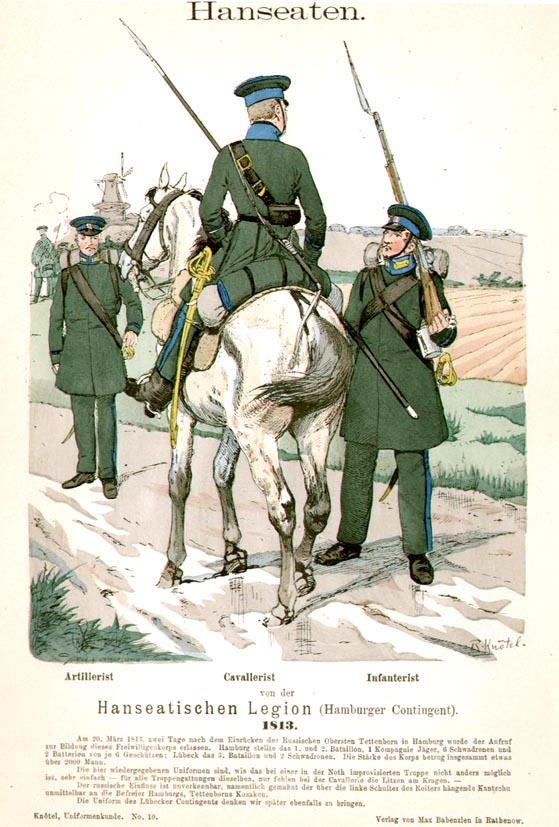
Members of the Hanseatic Legion and the Hamburg Citizen Militia wearing peaked caps, 1813

The peaked cap originated in late 18th or early 19th-century Northern Europe, usually worn by working-class men. It began to appear in 1811, in the later years of the Napoleonic Wars, in the Russian and later the Prussian army (Russia's ally at that time), being popular because of its comfort and light weight, as opposed to the cumbersome bicorns and shakos that were standard-duty issue. During the Biedermeier period (1815–48), it became universal dress for German and Austrian civilian males of all classes, and for the entire 19th century it was popular with the working classes all over Northern Europe, although in England the flat cap became more popular with the working class around the turn of the century.

In 1846, the United States Army adopted the peaked cap during the Mexican–American War due to the unsuitability of the shako in the hot Mexican climate. In 1879, a form of peaked cap was adopted by chief petty officers of Britain's Royal Navy, in imitation of an undress headdress worn by officers from as early as 1825. The British Army adopted peaked caps in 1902 for both the new khaki field dress and (in coloured form) as part of the "walking out" or off-duty wear for other ranks. A dark blue version was worn with dress blues by all ranks of the U.S. Army between 1902 and 1917.

During the 20th century, the combination or peaked cap became common in the armies, navies, air forces and police forces of the world, although replaced in combat by protective combat helmets.

During the Cold War and after dissolution of the Soviet Union, uniforms copied from the Russian pattern were issued to the armies of various Asian, Eastern European, African communist nations and post-Soviet states (except Baltic states, Azerbaijan (similar design but closely aligned with the Turkish counterparts), Georgia (after 2004) and Ukraine (after 2016)). Particularly famous are the oversized caps worn by North Korean army officers, unchanged from the 1950s to 2023.

== Military usage ==
=== Australia ===
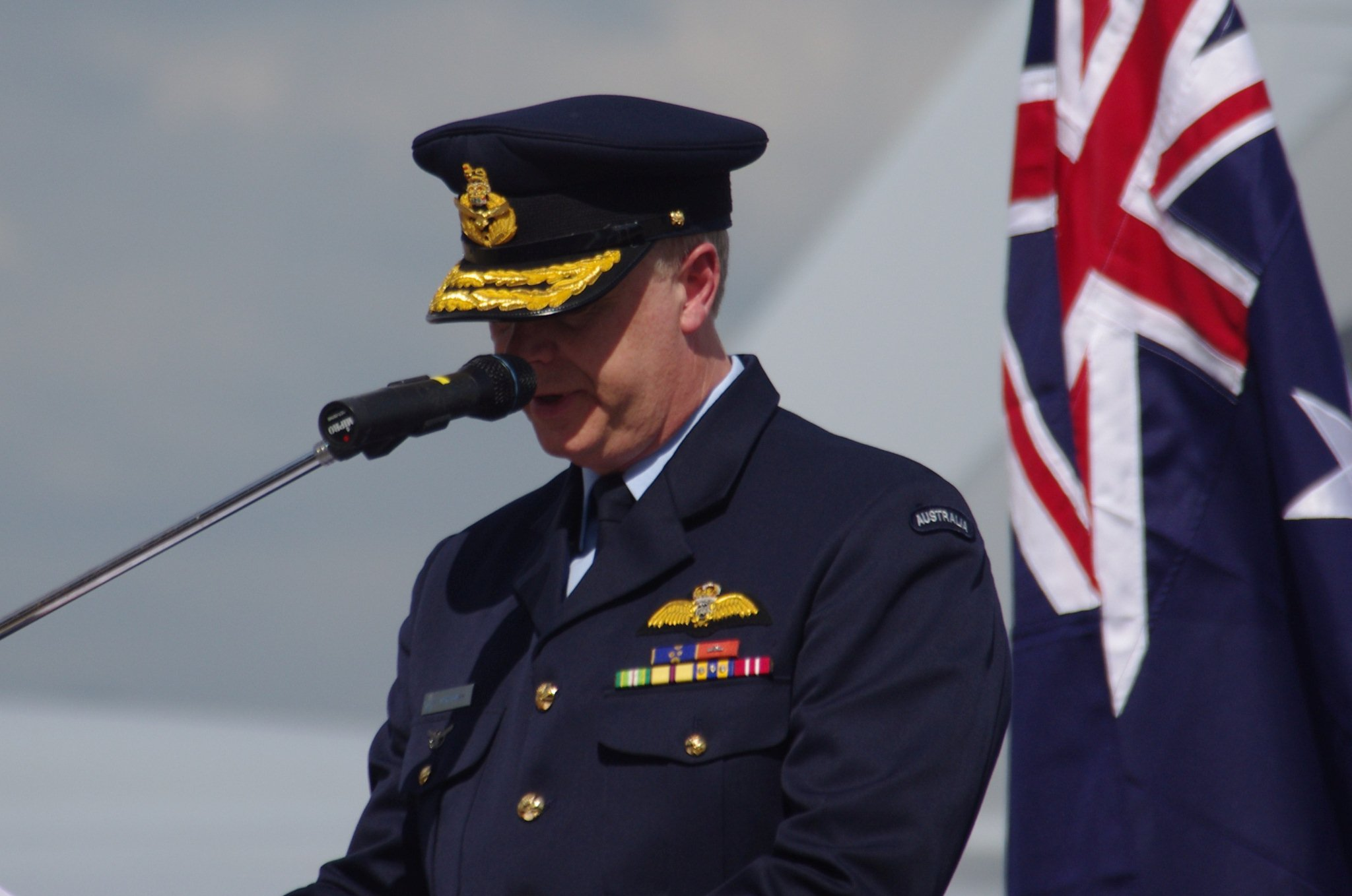
Air Marshal Mark Binskin wearing a peaked cap (2010)

In the Australian Army, the peaked cap is known as the service cap and is generally worn with the "Patrol Blues" order of dress by all ranks with the cap colour being blue. A khaki service cap could be worn by warrant officers, commissioned officers and officer/staff cadets with any general duty order of dress and working or protective dress until September 2010. The khaki service cap was officially reintroduced in February 2026, and was first publicly seen when the new Regimental Sergeant Major of the Army, Brad Doyle, was introduced on Army social media channels in July 2026.

In the Royal Australian Air Force, the peaked cap is the standard headdress for all ranks, usually worn with service dress, ceremonial dress and tropical dress among others.

In the Royal Australian Navy, the peaked cap is the standard headdress worn by personnel holding the rank of petty officer and above when wearing ceremonial dress, regular day dress and informal evening dress among others.

=== Austria ===
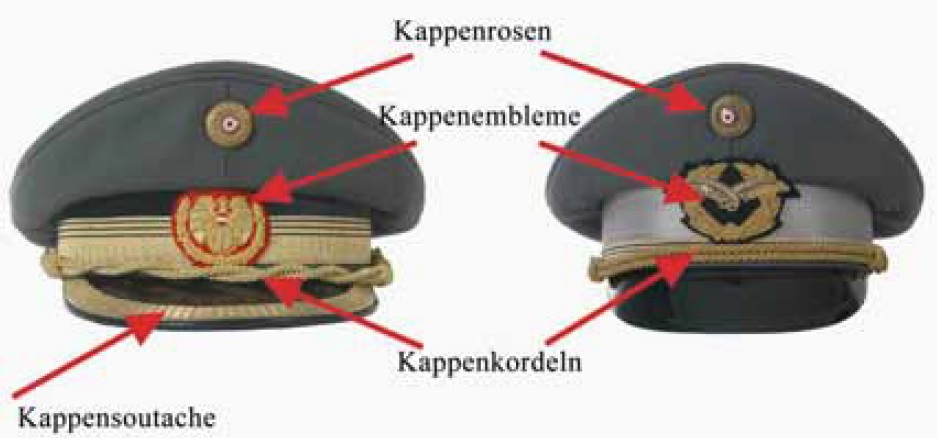
Diagram of peaked caps used by the Austrian Armed Forces (labels in German)

Throughout the 19th century, the Austro-Hungarian Army were issued with shakos, originally in black leather and later in pike grey wool. Gradually, the height of the shako decreased and the cardboard stiffening removed until, by 1908, it had evolved into the ski cap. This was worn by Austrian officers and enlisted personnel during both World Wars, but when the postwar Austrian Bundesheer was established in 1955 an olive drab peaked cap and American style uniform were introduced.

=== Canada ===
The cap was used in the early stages of the First World War as the primary headgear, but increased head injuries led to its replacement by the Brodie helmet as primary combat head protection.

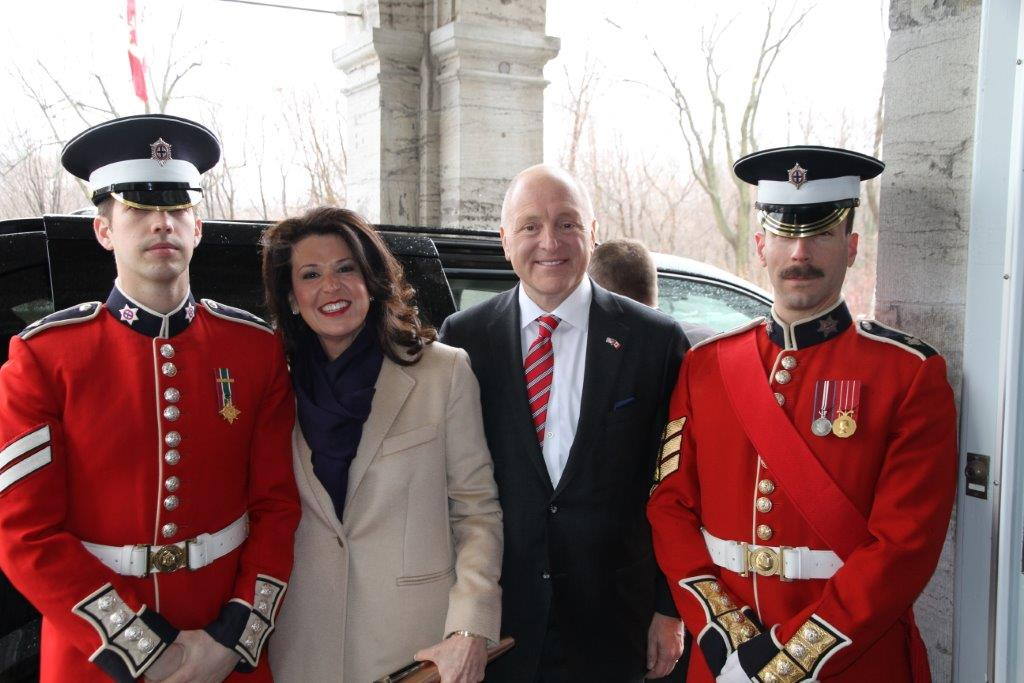
Members of the Governor General's Foot Guards wearing undress peaked caps with full dress tunics

In the Canadian Forces, the peaked cap (French: casquette de service) is the primary headgear for men's (and optional headgear for women's) Royal Canadian Navy service dress. It has been abandoned in the Royal Canadian Air Force in favour of the wedge cap. It has also been eliminated from the Canadian Army service dress in favour of the beret, with two exceptions. General officers and chief warrant officers wearing army service dress can wear either a beret or a peaked cap. Royal Canadian Infantry Corps members of foot guards units such as the Canadian Grenadier Guards and Governor General's Foot Guards wear the bearskin cap with full dress but the peaked cap (known as a forage cap) with undress and service dress. The peaked cap remains the headdress for the undress uniforms of several army regiments.

On navy caps, the peak and chinstrap of the service cap are always black. The cap band is black with the exception of navy military police, who wear a scarlet cap band, and members of Canadian Special Operations Forces Command, who wear a tan cap band.

On both navy and army caps, the chinstrap is affixed to the cap via two small buttons, one roughly over each ear; these buttons are miniature versions of the buttons on the service dress tunic, and as such bear an RCN or regimental device.

The peak of the cap of non-commissioned members and subordinate officers is left plain, and officers' caps are adorned with one or more bands of braid (depending on rank) at the forward edge of the peak. The peak of the junior officer's cap has one row of plain gold wire along the forward edge, that of the senior officer has a row of gold oak leaves across the forward edge, while that of the flag officer has two rows of gold oak leaves, one along the forward edge and one near the cap band. The same oak leaves are worn by the Governor General of Canada as Commander-in-Chief of the Canadian Armed Forces.

The service cap is theoretically unisex, although there is a service hat (French: chapeau de service) for women which does not have a crown top and has a stiff brim all around. The front of the brim is formed into a visor and the sides and back are folded upwards.

=== China ===
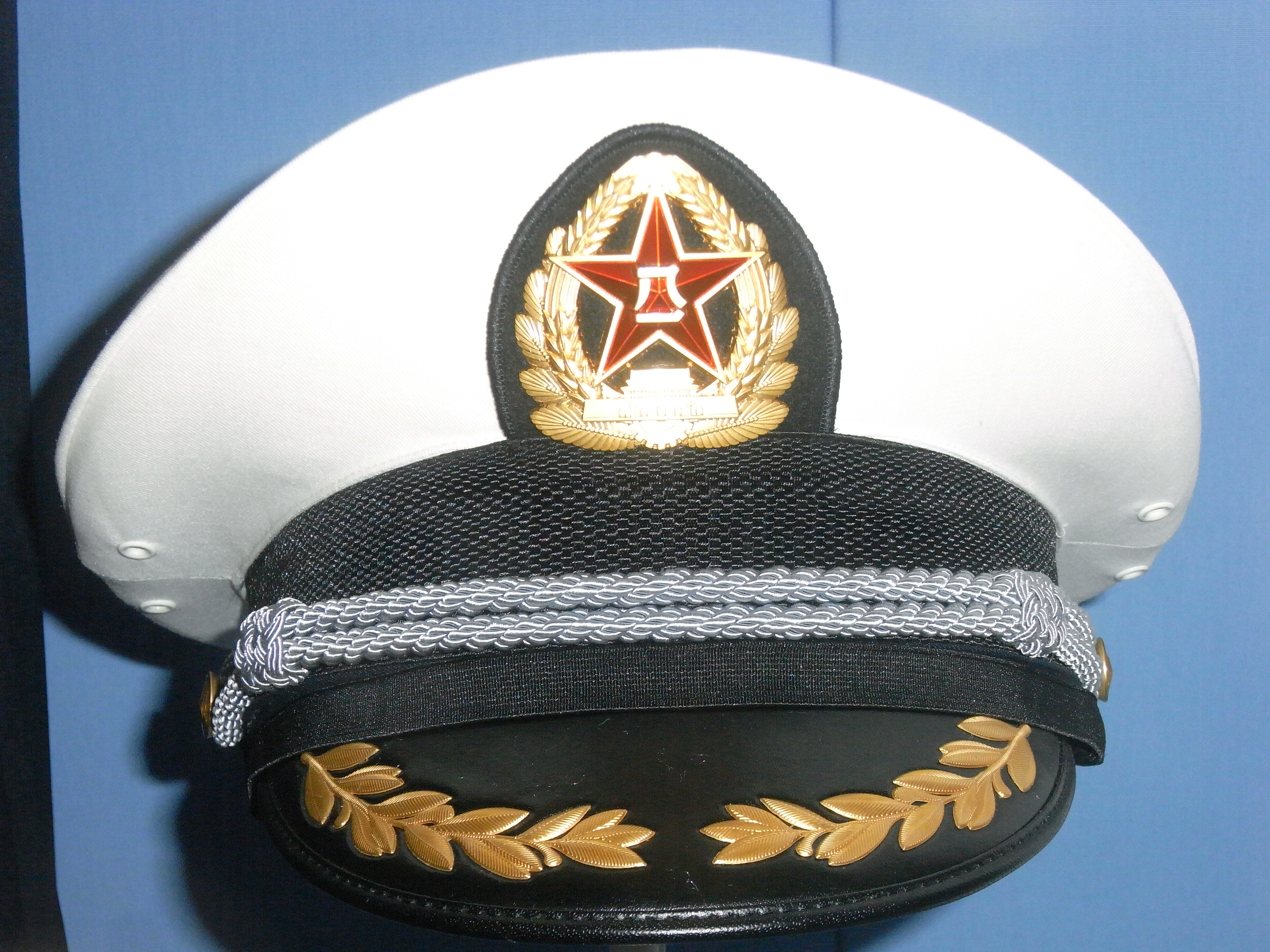
Peaked caps formerly used by the Chinese People's Liberation Army Navy

Members of the People's Liberation Army also wear a peaked cap, with design influenced by the former Soviet Union. However, since from 2007, PLA started to change to adapt the Type 07 Service Uniform, the new uniform retains the peaked cap, but styled more like US and Commonwealth peaked caps.

=== Denmark ===
In Denmark, the use of the peaked cap as part of official uniforms has gradually declined, but it is still used in the ceremonial uniforms of the general corps of the Army, officers of the Air Force and Navy, the police, and the fire department.

=== Germany ===
Peaked caps were first issued to German Landwehr troops during the Napoleonic Wars known as the Wachstuchmütze and made from oil cloth, since these were cheaper and easier to maintain than the heavy leather shakos and elaborate tailcoats worn by the British, French and Russian armies. The Prussian army was also the first to adopt the frock coat, so officers would not soil their dress uniforms on campaign.

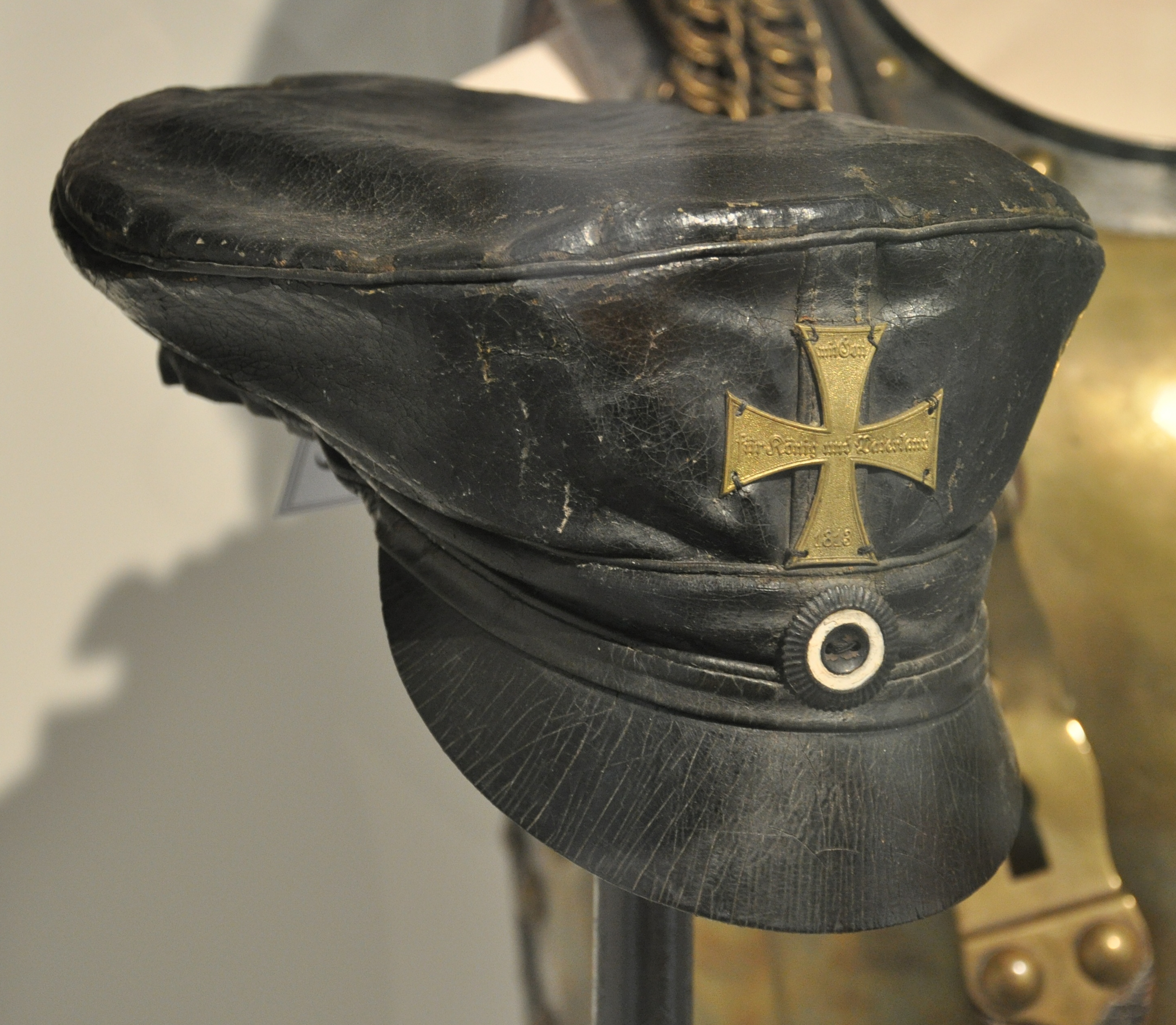
Napoleonic-era Landwehrmütze cap of the Prussian army

When the spiked Pickelhaube helmet was introduced during the 1840s, enlisted German troops were issued with peakless forage caps resembling the sailor cap. Officers, however, continued to wear the German-style peaked cap (Schirmmütze) to set themselves apart from the French, who wore the kepi peaked cap. Initially, German peaked caps were in the uniform color (e.g., Prussian blue, cornflower blue, green, etc.), but before the First World War a field grey hat was issued, with piping colour coded for infantry, artillery or cavalry. These caps, known as "crushers", could be worn beneath a Stahlhelm helmet or stuffed into a pocket or knapsack.

In 1935, the Nazis introduced new uniforms designed for modern mechanised warfare. However, the basic design including the peaked cap remained the same as in the Weimar Republic's Reichsheer. But the new national emblem featuring eagle clutching swastika, and black-red-white roundel in oak wreath were introduced on the caps. Enlisted personnel and non-commissioned officers were issued with peaked caps with leather chincord. Officers received caps with metallic chincord. Both enlisted-NCOs' caps and officers' caps had specially colored piping around the cap according to their service branch (white for infantry, pink for panzer and so on). Gestapo and SS men were issued with black Schirmmützen featuring a silver death's head. On campaign, Wehrmacht officers often removed the wire stiffening so the cap would resemble the older First World War–era crusher.

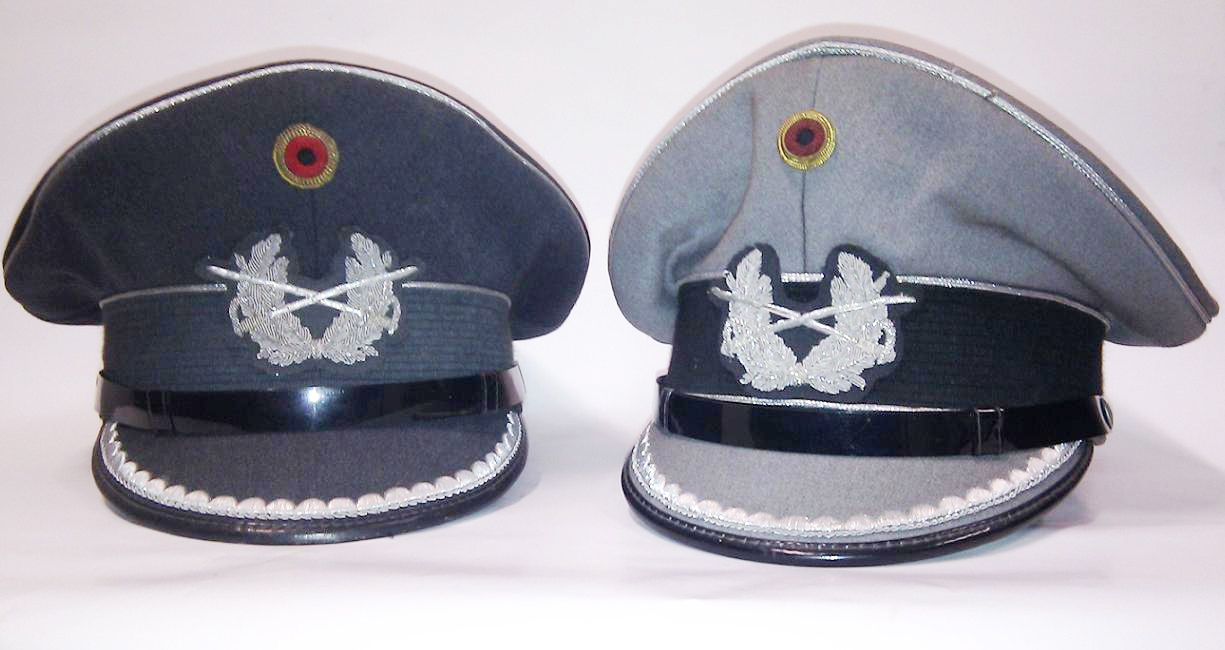
Schirmmützen of the pre-1989 West German army (left) and modern Bundeswehr (right)

After the Second World War, both the West German Bundeswehr and East German National People's Army continued to be issued uniforms derived from the Second World War pattern. East German caps bore the DDR State Cockade with the Hammer and Compass design, while West German caps had a cockade in the German national colours, and a badge featuring a wreath with either a pair of crossed swords for the army, wings for the Air Force or an anchor for the navy. After reunification, the Schirmmütze remained part of the German army dress uniform although has mostly been replaced with the beret. The German navy and Air Force still wear a peaked cap as part of their service dress uniform.

=== Indonesia ===
Members of the armed and uniformed services in Indonesia wear the peaked cap during ceremonial and operational duties. It is widely worn by the Indonesian National Police, the Indonesian National Armed Forces and other uniformed institutions in the country.

=== Israel ===
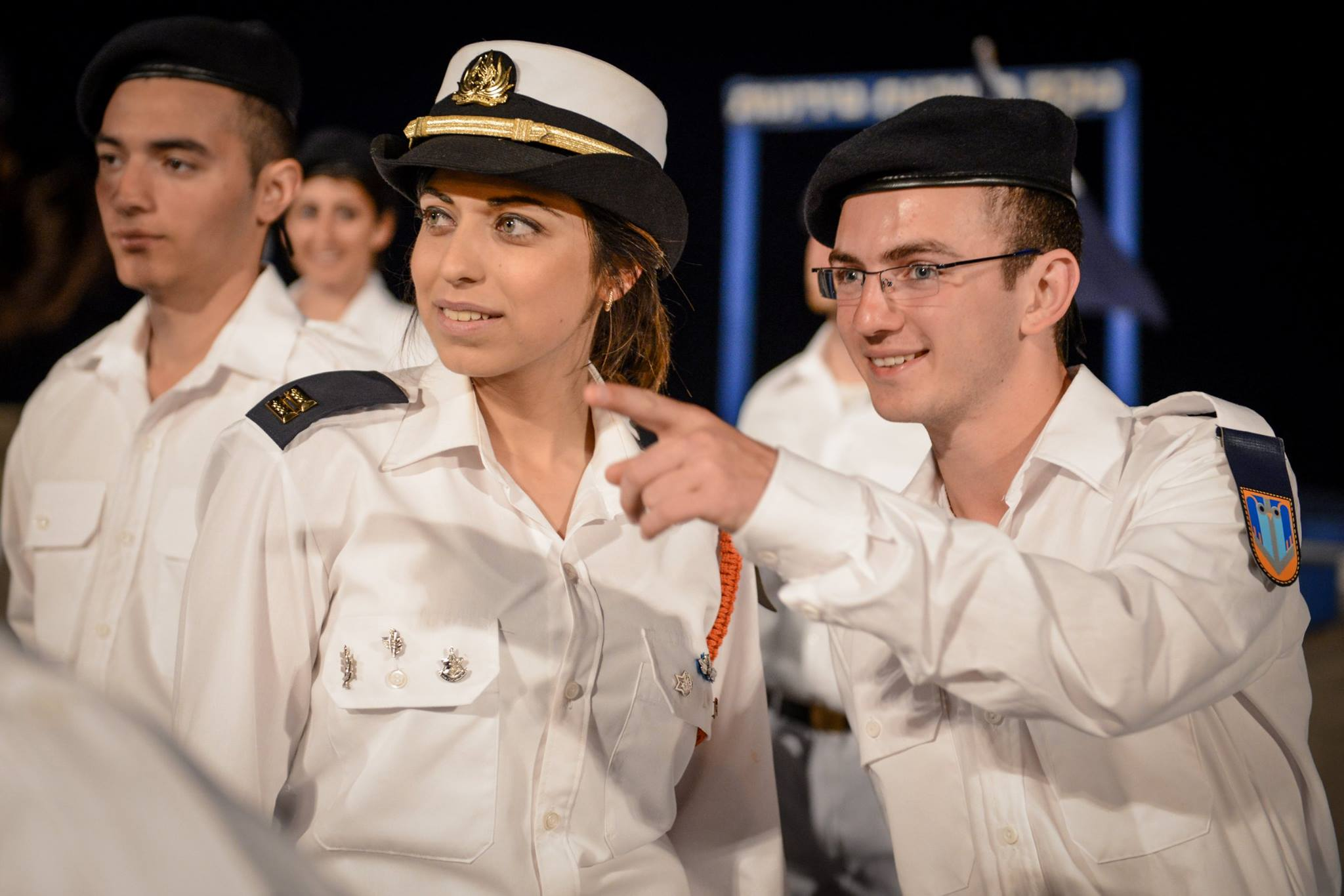
Israel Sea Corps officer wearing a combination cover for women

In the Israel Defense Forces, combination caps are used only by Israeli Air Force and Navy officers in ceremonial dress; Military Police soldiers while on duty; Israel Defense Forces Orchestra soldiers; and some regimental sergeants major of other service branches when in ceremonial dress.

=== Poland ===
The rogatywka is a 4-cornered type of peaked cap, related to the czapka and worn by members of the Polish Land Forces.

Naval officers and air force personnel, however, wear conventional peaked caps.

=== Philippines ===
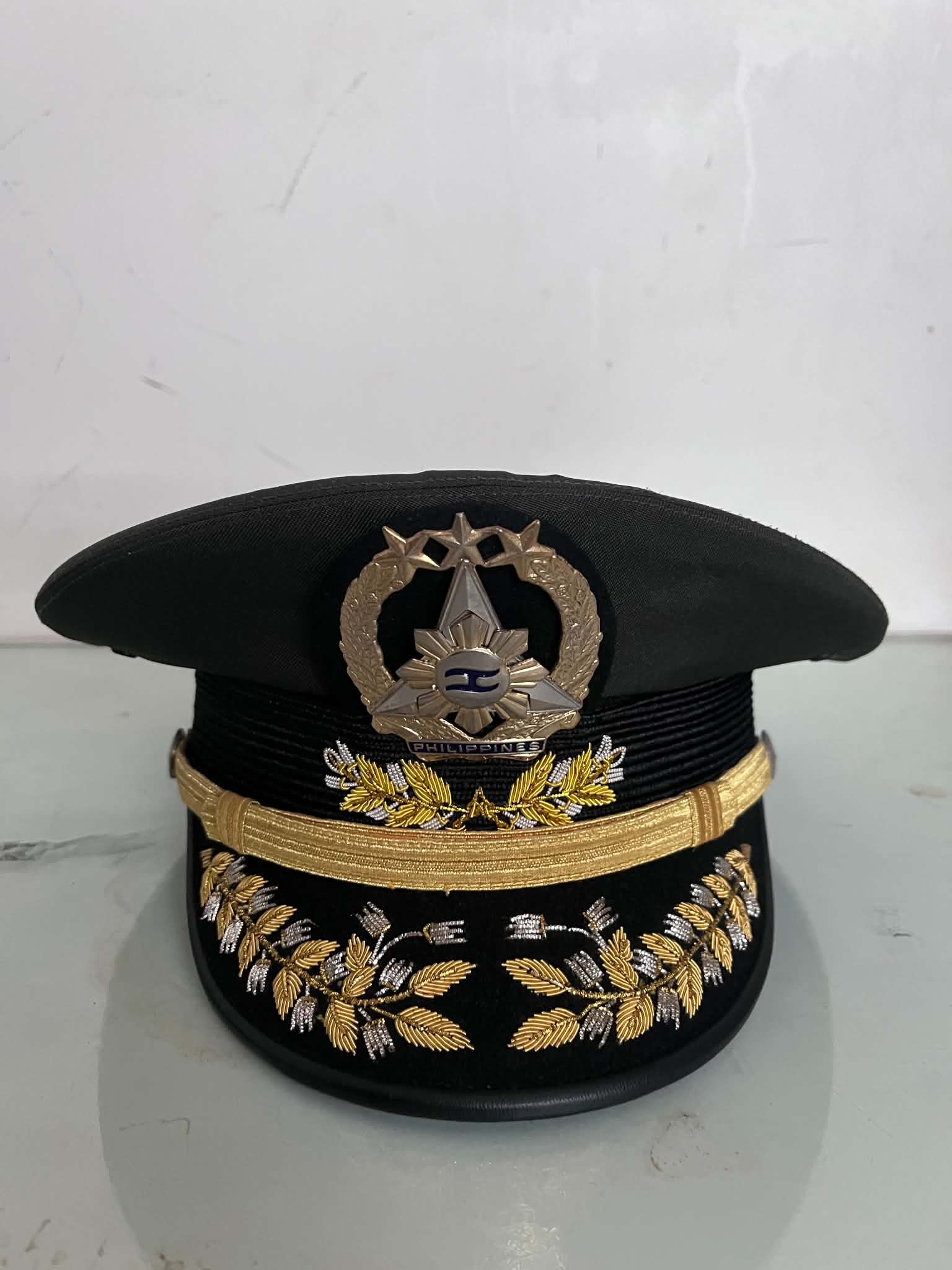
A Philippine Army Pershing Cap used by a Brigadier general indicated by the laurels in the visor and an arc of laurels in the cap band.

The Armed Forces of the Philippines uses the Pershing Cap, a flat-topped service cap named after General John J. Pershing, a military governor of the Philippines during the American occupation of the country. Peaked caps were already used by the Philippine Constabulary and the Philippine Commonwealth Army since their formation. The Armed Forces of the Philippines adopted the Pershing Cap with minor variations through the years, with the most modern regulations dating to 2015.

The Pershing Cap can easily distinguish the rank of officers and enlisted personnel. Enlisted personnel have a cap badge with the service insignia of the Armed Forces and black sliding loops. Company Grade Officers have the AFP insignia along with gold sliding loops. Field and General Grade Officers have caps adorned with golden laurels on the visor and band, with General Officers having additional laurels on their cap bands.

The Philippine Air Force Philippine Marine Corps and Philippine Navy have similar regulations for their caps alongside the Army. The difference can be found in the colors of their cap and insignia. Gala uniforms of the different branches have their own respective designs.

Air Force Pershing Caps use Air Force Blue with silver loops and AFP insignia. However, General Grade Officers have gold laurels and insignia. The Marines have similar features with the Army with the only difference being the crown having a Forest Green color. Enlisted Marines also have a White enlisted cap bearing similarity to the United States Marine Corps cover. The Navy has similarities to the Army Pershing Cap with the only difference being a white crown.

=== Russia ===
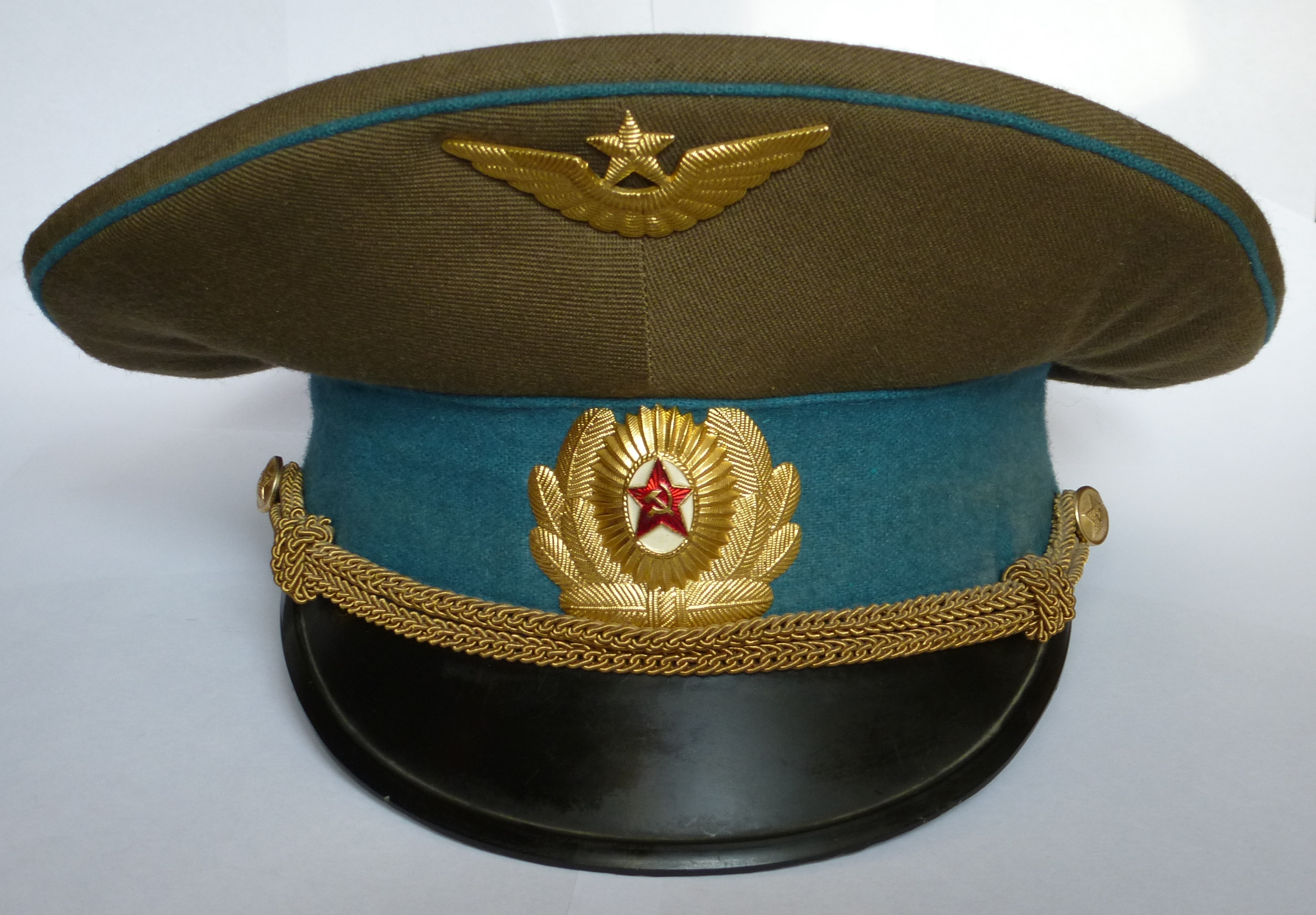
An officer's peaked cap as used by the Soviet Air Force and Soviet Airborne Forces from 1969 to 1991

Russia was the first country to adopt the peaked cap. The official act of adopting the cap for military use was made by Alexander I of Russia in 1811. During the Napoleonic Wars, various early versions of the peaked cap were in use in the Russian army. Imperial Russia abandoned the cap for a short period in the second half of the 19th century for a forage cap similar to the one used by Americans during their civil war, but the peaked cap soon returned. Early soldiers' peaked caps were, in fact, peakless, hence the nickname солдатский блин (soldier's flapjack) for the headgear; officers' caps had peaks from the start and looked like modern peaked caps. The peakless version remained in use in the Russian navy under the name of beskozyrka (literally "peakless one") and is still worn by Russian seamen. Also during the Imperial period, peaked caps were introduced as part of government officials' uniforms. Serfs and peasants adopted an almost identical hat into their fashion after the Napoleonic Wars, known as a kartuz.

In 1914, peakless caps were abolished everywhere in Russian armed forces except the Navy, and modern peaked caps were issued to all soldiers. However, after the October Revolution of 1917, it was replaced in Red Army field uniforms by the budenovka, and later by the garrison cap. The dress uniforms, on the other hand, retained this headgear, and various paramilitary Soviet agencies like the NKVD or VOKhR kept using it in all uniforms. Agencies like railway workers, firemen, pilots, mining supervisors, foresters, customs officers in the Soviet Union also were organised along military lines and wore uniforms with peaked caps of various designs.

In the 1990s, the Russian peaked cap was redesigned and widely issued to the armed forces and police. Caps of this shape are most associated with Russia among foreigners, since they are large and high. In 2012, after army general Sergey Shoygu was appointed Minister of Defence, the design of the peaked cap was changed again to a lower and more proportional style.

=== Serbia ===
Peaked caps are worn by non-commissioned officers and officers of the Serbian Army (including the Serbian River Flotilla) and the Serbian Air Force and Air Defence. Women wear a different style.

=== Syria ===
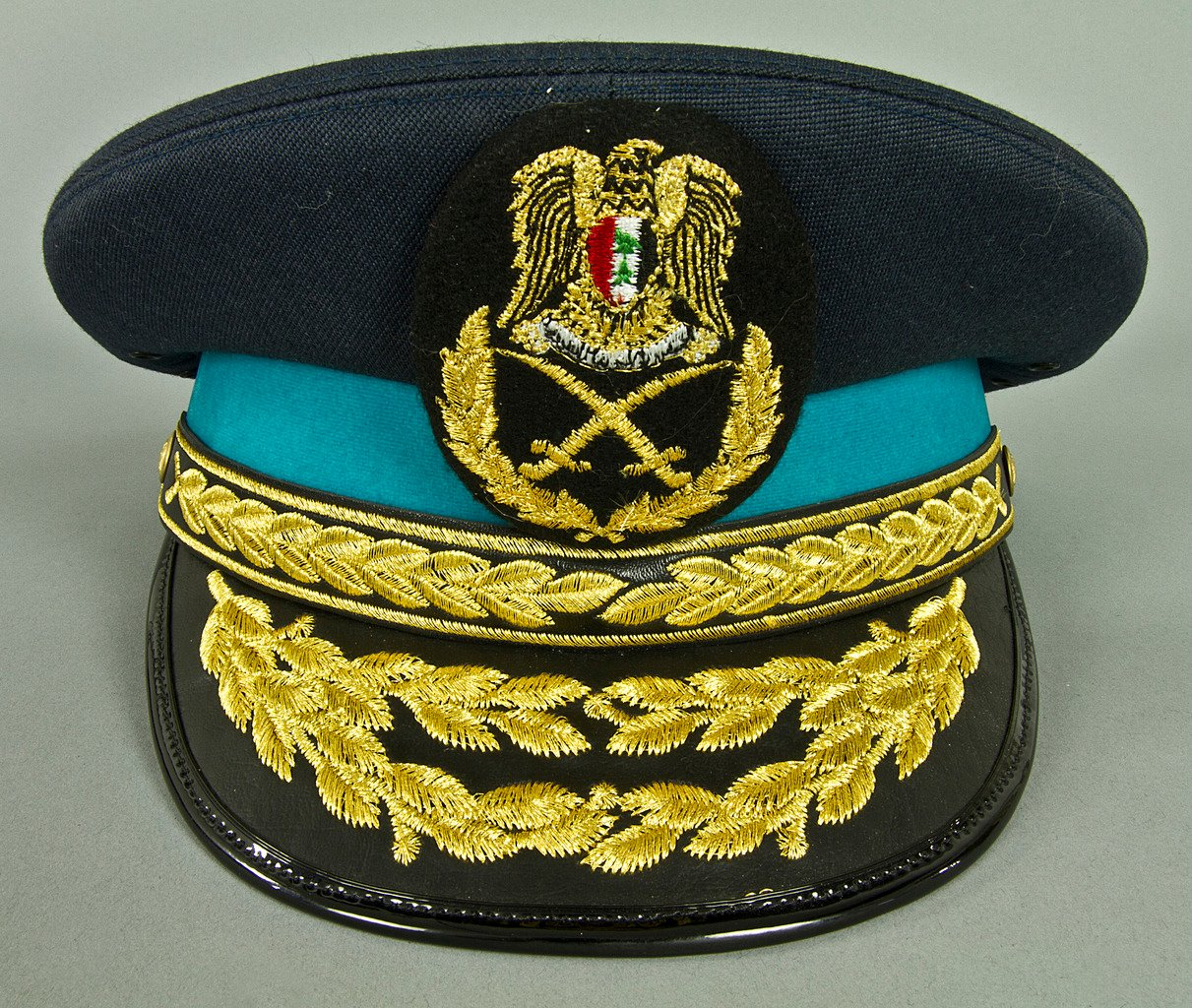
Closeup of a peaked cap of a Syrian Arab Air Force general

Peaked caps are worn by commissioned officers of the four service branches as part of their full-dress uniform, the Syrian Arab Armed Forces typically wear berets as part of their service uniform. the Syrian Arab Military Police notably wear red covers on their peaked caps.

=== United Kingdom ===
==== Royal Navy ====
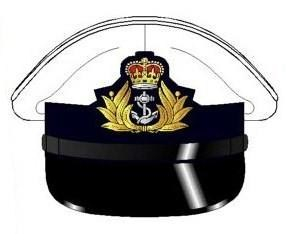
Junior officer's cap

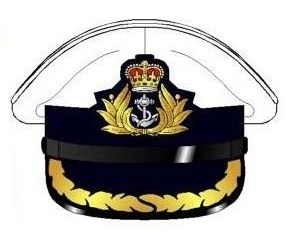
Senior officer's cap

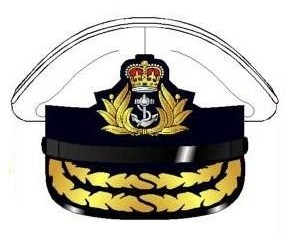
Admiral's cap

Royal Navy officers were first issued peaked caps in 1825 as a less formal alternative to the bicorne hat. From 1846, it was worn with a crown on the front, and later (from 1856), gold braid was added to the brim to ensure commissioned officers were instantly recognised by their subordinates. Commanders, captains and commodores had one row of braid on their peaks, whereas flag officers had two. Before the Second World War, naval officers were required to possess two caps: one with a white cover for summer and one without for winter. However, flag officers often preferred the white-topped cap in order to stand out from their subordinates.

Male Royal Navy officers, warrant officers, chief petty officers and petty officers today wear a framed cap with a white cover and a black band in nos 1, 2 and 3 dress; originally worn only in tropical climates, the white cover was adopted for all areas after the Second World War. Officers have the option of a cotton or plastic cover. Female personnel wear a tricorne hat instead.

==== Royal Marines ====
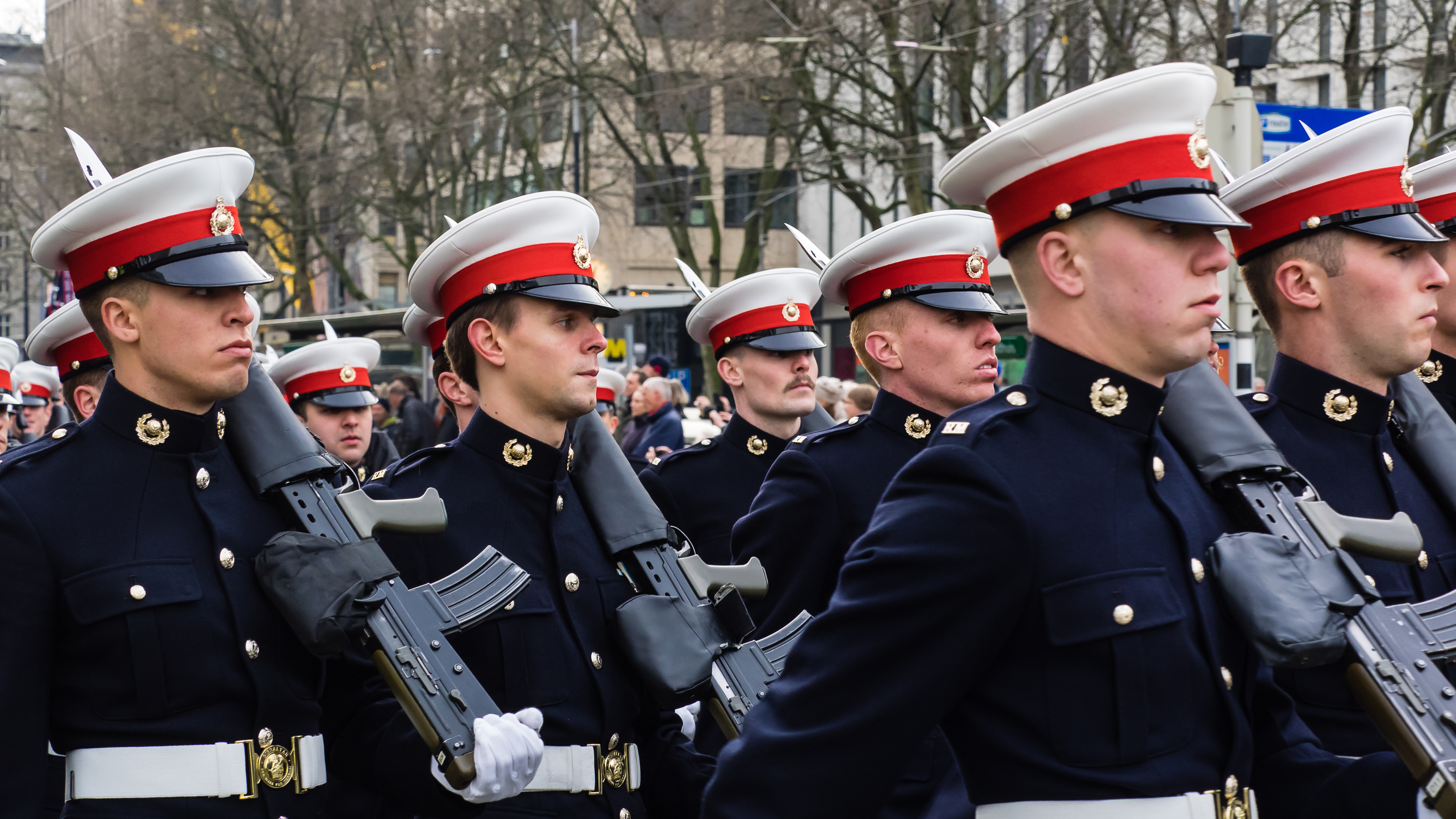
Members of the Royal Marines wearing a peaked cap with a white cover and a red band.

All Royal Marines personnel wear a cap with a white cover and a red band with 'blues' uniform. The Royal Marines Band Service also wear this cap with the Lovat uniform and the 'Half Lovats' equivalent of army barrack dress. Women wear caps of a slightly different pattern.

==== British Army ====
British Army officers wore blue peaked caps as early as the Crimean War to distinguish themselves from enlisted men who wore the pillbox hat. The peaked caps were widely worn on campaign during the First and Second World Wars, until the more practical beret was popularised by generals like Sir Bernard Montgomery. After the war, officers continued to wear khaki caps as part of the number 2 dress uniform, but by the 1990s these had been phased out in favour of the dark blue and red caps previously worn with the number 1 dress uniform.

Peaked caps were first issued to enlisted men in 1908 to replace the Glengarry caps and pillbox hats of the Boer War era. The new caps were made of khaki wool and sometimes had a neck flap to protect against the cold. Nicknamed the "gor blimey", these caps are associated with the First World War 'Tommy Atkins' and continued to be issued to members of the Household Cavalry, Foot Guards, Home Guard and Territorial Army during the Second World War.

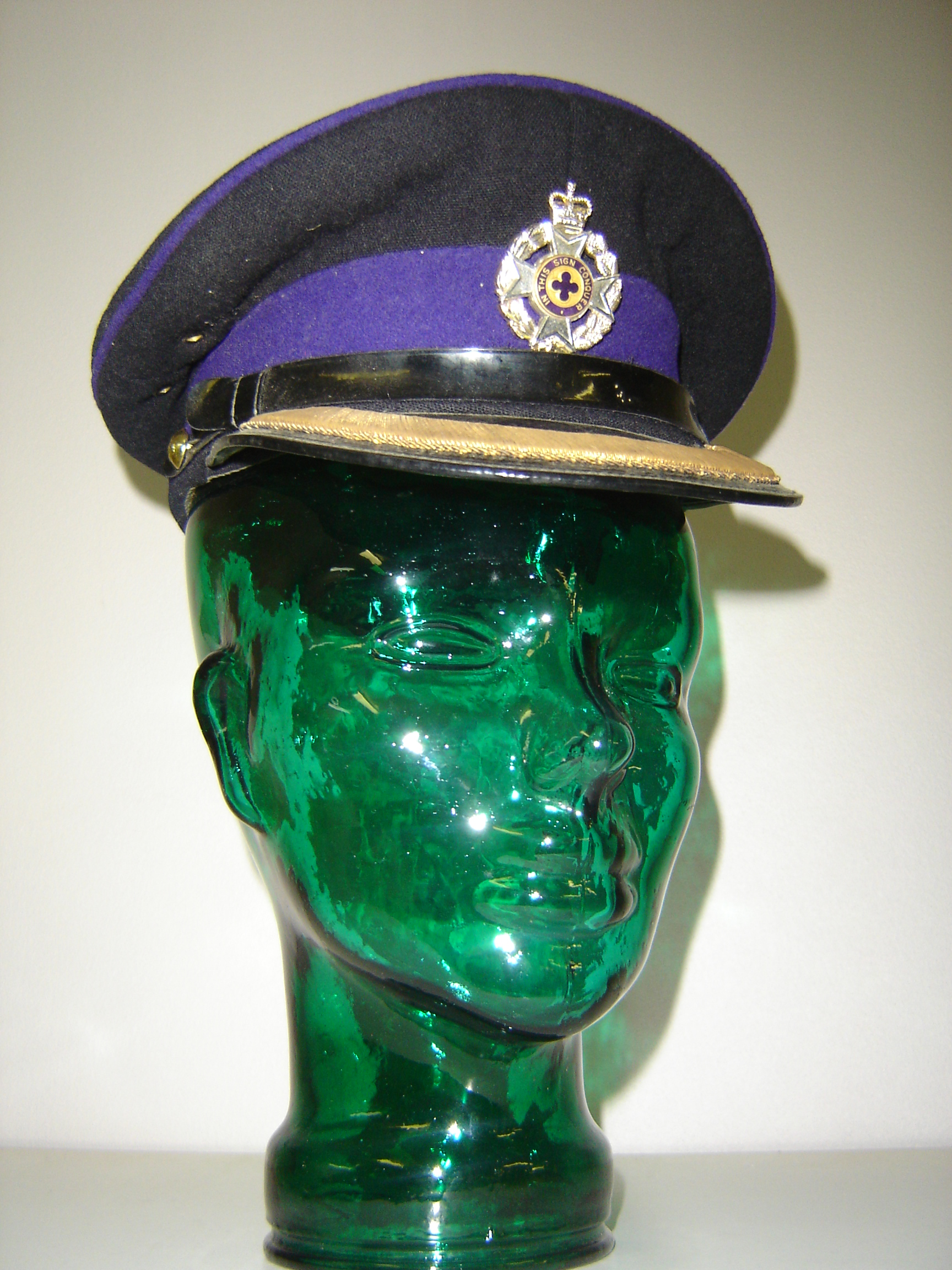
Peaked cap used by the Royal Army Chaplains' Department

All personnel of most regiments and corps of the British Army wear a forage cap, as the peaked cap is formally called, in numbers 1 and 2 dress, the exceptions being:

- The Royal Tank Regiment, Royal Regiment of Fusiliers, Army Air Corps, Parachute Regiment, Special Air Service, Intelligence Corps and 4/73 (Sphinx) Special Observation Post Battery RA, who wear berets;
- The Royal Regiment of Scotland, who wear a regimental Glengarry with cockfeathers taken from the former ceremonial uniform of the Royal Scots;
- The Royal Irish Regiment, who wear the caubeen;
- The Brigade of Gurkhas, who wear a round Kilmarnock cap in no 1 dress and the slouch hat in no 2 dress
- The Queen's Royal Hussars, whose officers wear a tent hat in no 2 dress.

It has a cap band which may be coloured (red for all royal regiments and corps), a crown (formerly khaki, now dark blue, except for the Royal Military Police, who have always worn red, and the Rifles, who wear rifle green), which may have coloured piping or a regimental/corps colour, and a patent leather peak and chinstrap. The chinstrap is usually secured above and across the peak and secured at each end by a small (20 ligne) button of the appropriate regimental or corps pattern.

Officers in some regiments are also required to wear a khaki version of the cap, often called the "service dress cap", with service dress (the officers' no 2 dress) or barrack dress; the design of this dates back to the cap worn in the field until replaced by the steel helmet during the First World War.

Female personnel wear a peaked cap of a different pattern. For uniformity, however, female musicians wear the same peaked cap as male personnel in formal dress. Members of the Auxiliary Territorial Service wore a soft peaked cap of a different pattern again.

==== Royal Air Force ====
All male personnel of the Royal Air Force wear a cap with a blue-grey crown and a black band, worn with the appropriate badge, in no 1 dress, and sometimes in other uniforms as well. The peak is:

- Black and polished for airmen, non-commissioned officers (NCOs) and warrant officers
- Blue-grey fabric for officers of the rank of wing commander and below
- Black and polished with one row of gold oak leaves for officers of the rank of group captain
- Black and polished with two rows of gold oak leaves for officers of the rank of air commodore and above

The caps of other ranks of the RAF Police have a white crown. Officer cadets wear the officers' cap with a white band instead of a black band.

Female officers and warrant officers wear a peaked cap of a different pattern. Female other ranks wear a round hat instead, although the female version of the peaked cap was formerly worn by all female ranks of the RAF Police. For uniformity, however, female musicians wear the same peaked cap as male personnel in formal dress. All ranks of the former Women's Auxiliary Air Force wore a peaked cap of a different pattern again, similar to that of the Auxiliary Territorial Service.

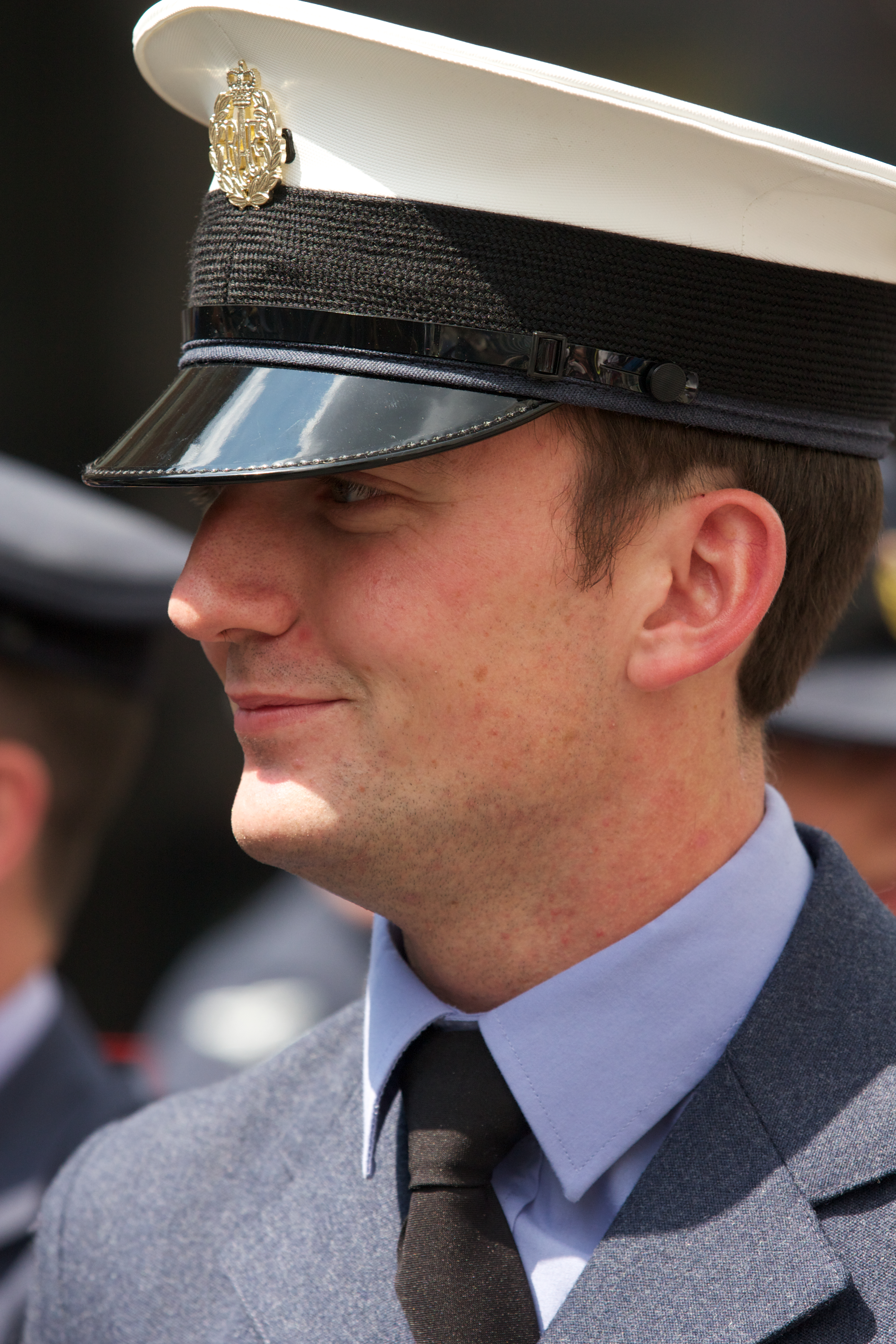
White peaked cap of other ranks in the RAF Police.

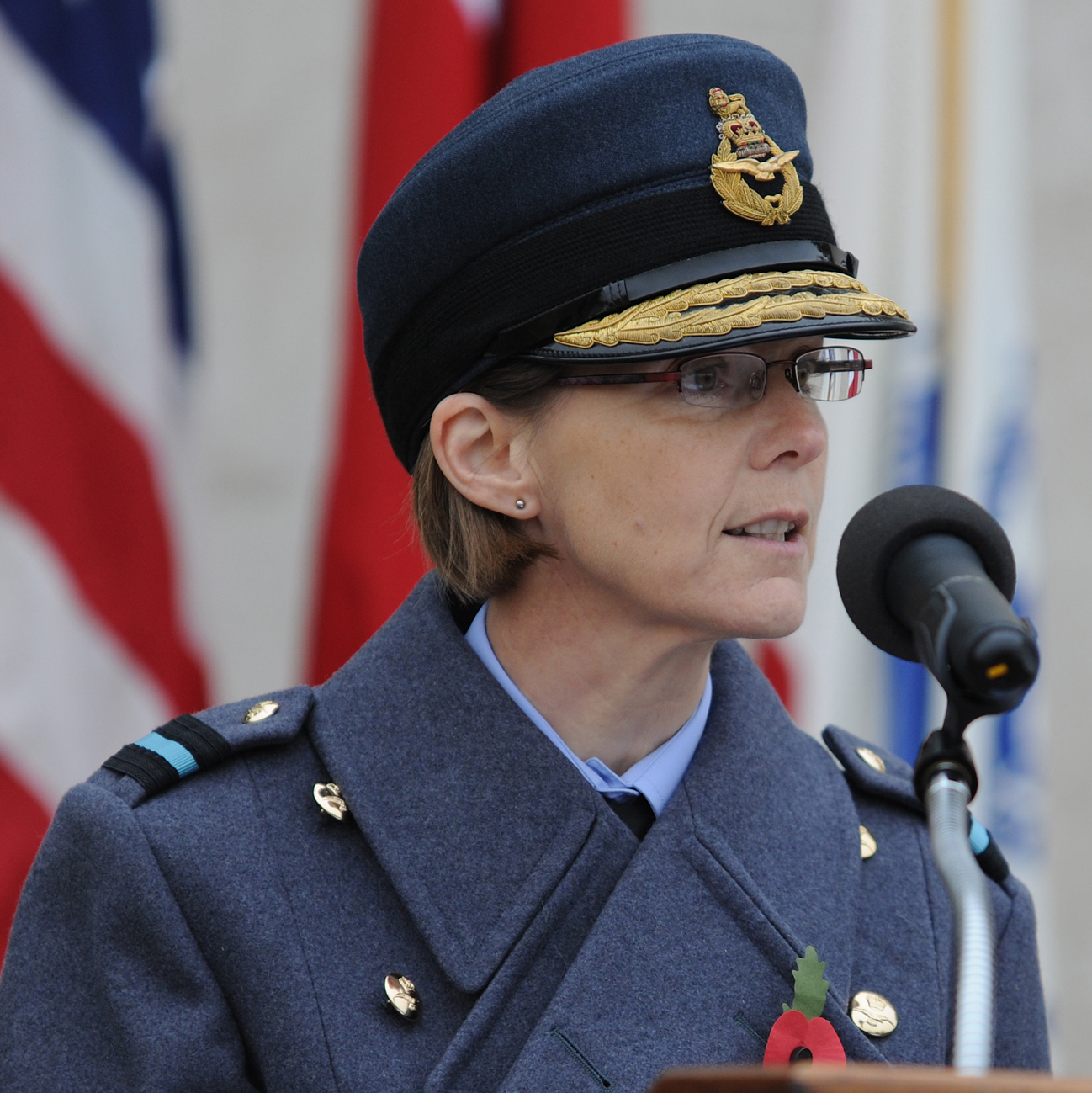
The female version of the RAF peaked cap, with air officers' oak leaves.

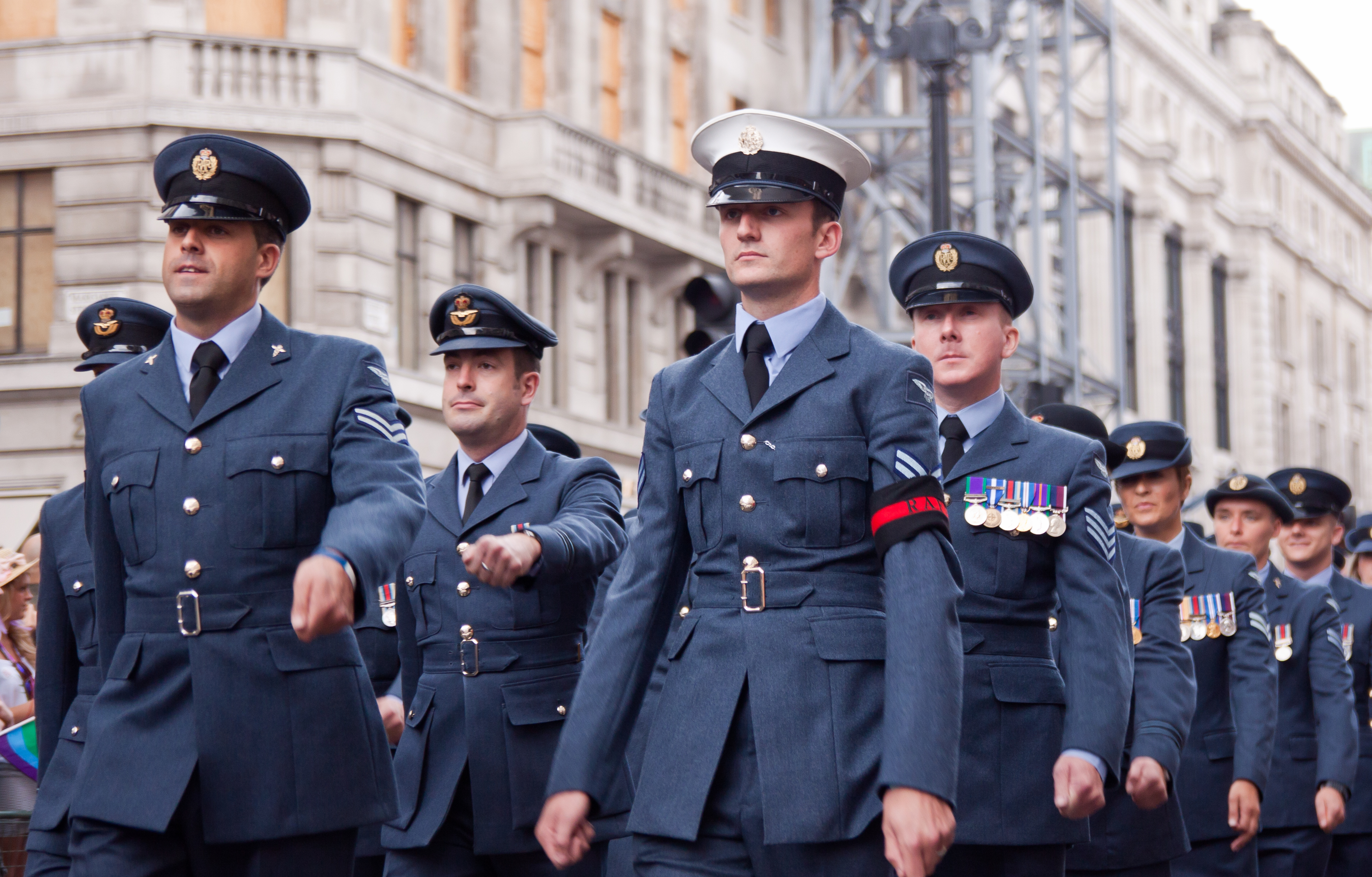
Members of the Royal Air Force wearing peaked caps (July 2011) including a white example worn by an RAF Police airman at the front right.

=== United States ===
==== United States Air Force ====
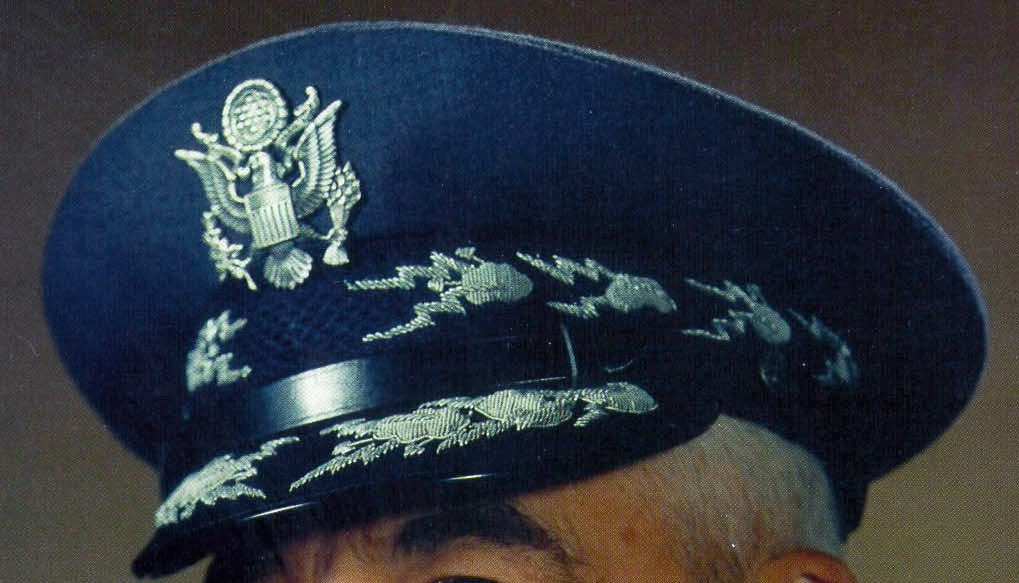
Cap of the Chief of Staff of the United States Air Force

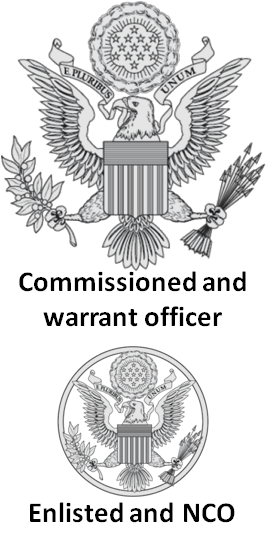
US Air Force cap devices

In the United States Air Force, all personnel have the option to wear service caps, but only field-grade (major through colonel) and general officers are required to own one.

Air Force service caps are Air Force blue (shade 1620), matching the coat and trousers of the service dress uniform, with a gloss black visor and black chinstrap secured by silver-colored buttons bearing a version of the "Hap Arnold emblem" first designed by James T. Rawls for use by the Air Force's predecessor, the Army Air Forces, in 1942. The cap badge consists of a relief of the Great Seal of the United States rendered in silver-colored metal. For enlisted members, the arms are surrounded by a silver-colored metal circle. Commissioned officers' insignia is larger and lacks the encompassing circle. The Air Force Band and Air Force Base Honor Guard each have their own distinctive cap insignia and other uniform devices. Field-grade officers' visors have two pairs of clouds and lightning bolts, patterned after the oak leaf motifs used by the other services. General officers' caps add an extra pair of clouds and bolts on the visor, while the cap of the Chief of Staff of the United States Air Force adds clouds and bolts around the entire cap band. The clouds and bolts are jokingly referred to in military slang as "farts and darts", much as the other services' oak leaf motifs are known as "scrambled eggs".

In 1949, the female version of the peaked cap, also called a bucket hat, began to be issued. The cap was a version of the navy female cap that was blue on the bottom and white on top. In 1991, the cap changed to all blue. Around 2012, the USAF moved to a unisex service cap, but still authorizes the optional female only bucket-style cap.

The USAF service cap is also worn by the Air Force's civilian auxiliary, the Civil Air Patrol (CAP). Senior members (those over the age of 18 who are not cadets and everyone over 21) may wear the service cap with a CAP-specific badge.

From its formation, Space Force guardians have worn USAF uniforms, including the service cap. Their new uniform was introduced in 2021.

US Air Force service caps
Enlisted & NCO	CMSAF	Company-grade officer	Field-grade officer	General officer	USAF chief of staff
Enlisted & NCO	CMSAF	Company-grade officer	Field-grade officer	General officer	
USAF band	USAF honor guard enlisted	USAF honor guard officer			

==== United States Space Force ====
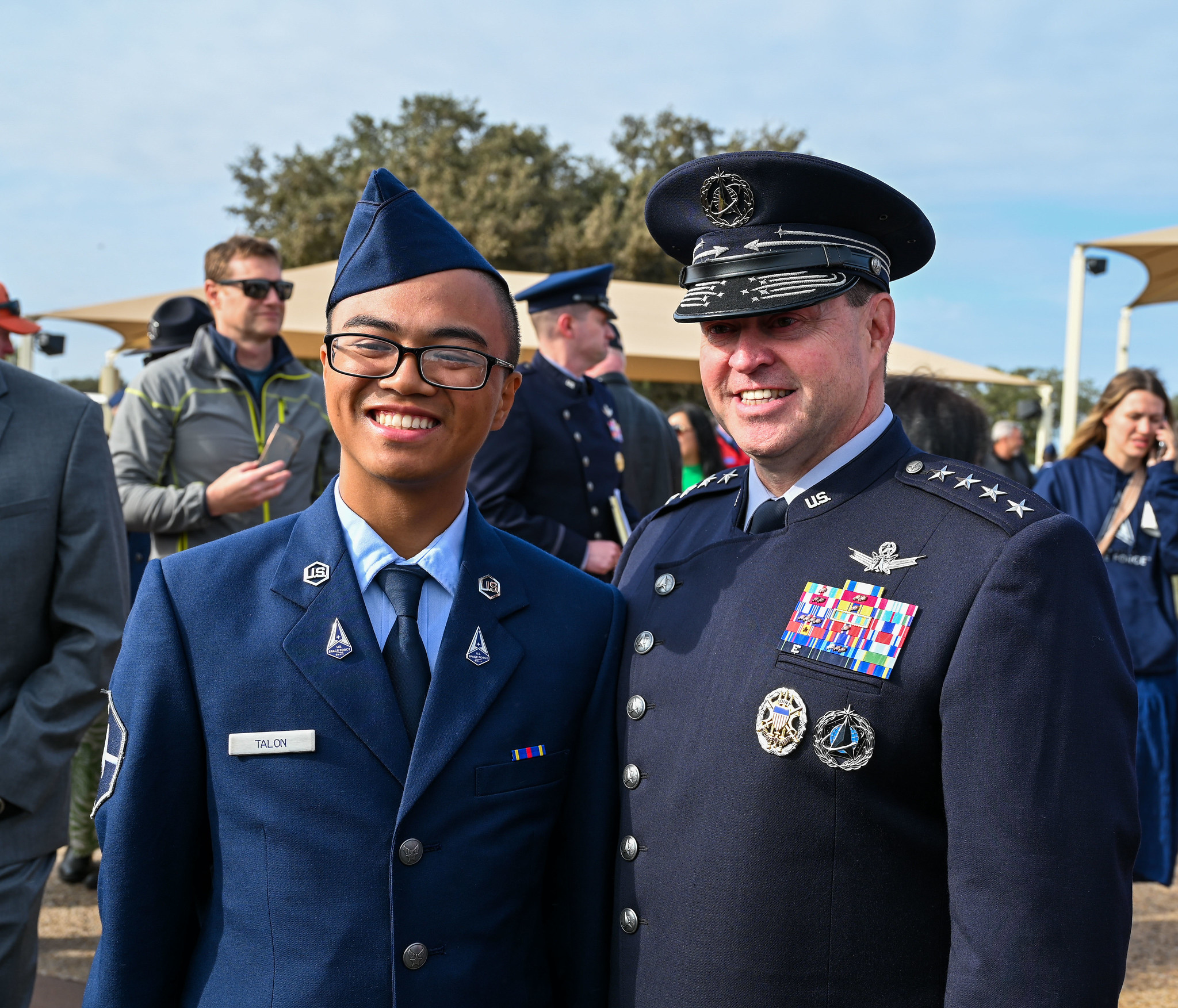

The United States Space Force originally wore US Air Force uniforms with USSF insignia replacing Air Force insignia beginning in 2022. Both officers and enlisted got a new service cap badge at that time, but Space Force–specific uniforms were still in the planning phase. In 2025, the USSF rolled out their new uniform in dark blue, and with it came new service caps. The service caps remain the same basic design as the USAF's but in the darker color. In January 2026 a Space Force guidance memo described the visor embellishments for field grade and general officers as embroidered shooting stars nicknamed "comets."

US Space Force service caps
Enlisted & NCO	Enlisted honor guard	CMSSF	Company-grade officer	Field-grade officer	General officer	USSF chief of space operations

==== United States Army ====
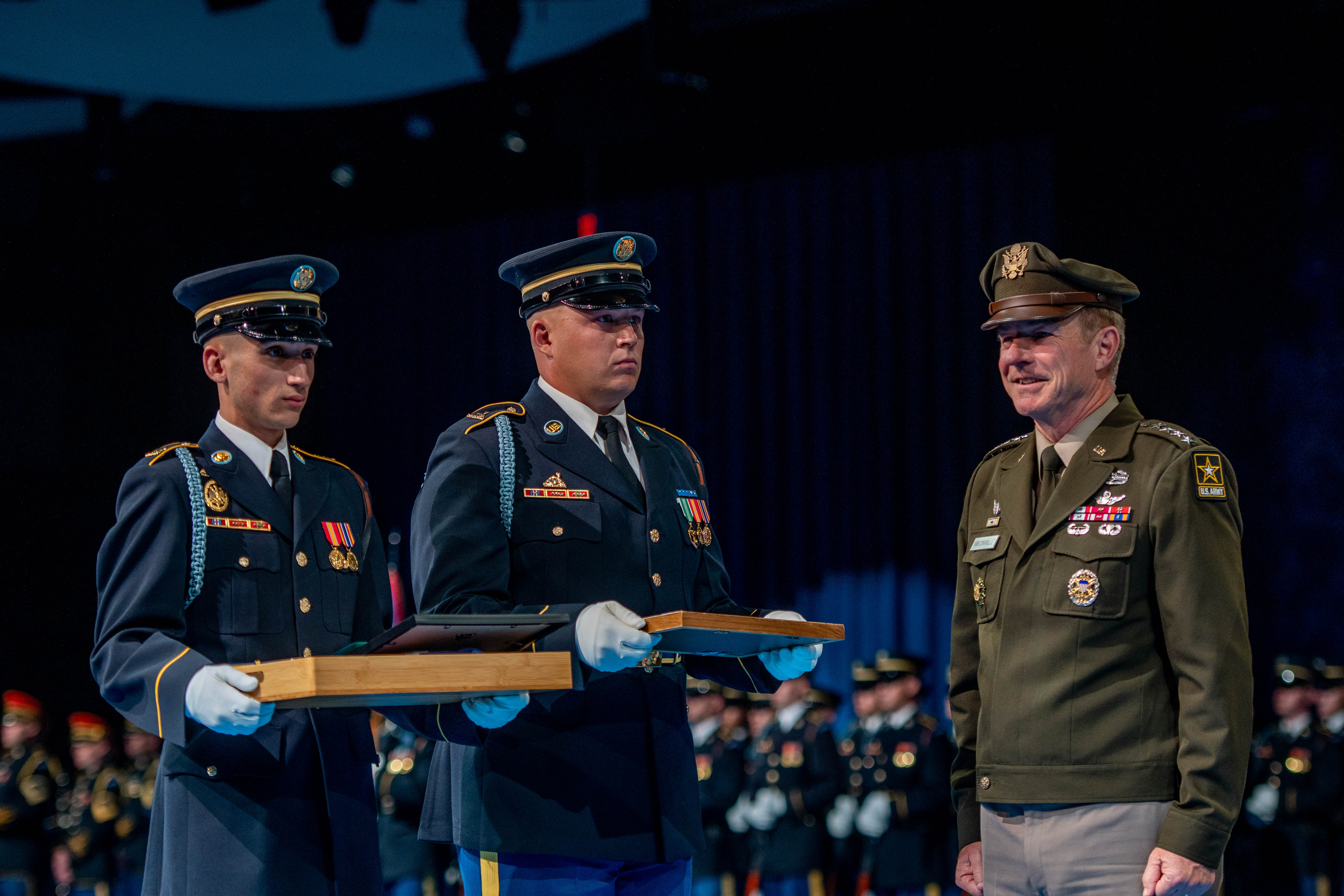
Two soldiers in Army Blue Service Dress and a general in Army Green Service Dress. All three are wearing peaked caps for their respective dress.

In the United States Army, service caps are optional for wear with the green service uniform. They consist of a dark olive drab top and hat band matching the uniform coat with a russet brown leather visor and chinstrap. The combination cap for the blue service is midnight blue matching the uniform coat with a gloss black visor. The enlisted cap has a golden stripe on top of the cap band and a black chinstrap. The version for officers has a cap band with the branch-of-service color between two golden stripes, and a gold-colored chinstrap. Field-grade officers have oak leaves, known unofficially as "scrambled eggs", on the visor. General officers' caps are similar to those of field-grade officers, but the cap band is dark blue and embroidered with gold oak leaf motifs. For both the green and blue caps, enlisted soldiers wear a cap badge of a circular disk embossed with the United States' coat of arms, while officers wear a larger badge of the coat of arms without any backing.

In the Army Blue ASU uniform, female soldiers wear the female version of the peaked cap in a dark blue-black color in the same style originally adopted with the 1960 Army Green Service Uniform. This is in direct contrast to the fact that female soldiers wear the peaked "crusher" cap in the Army Green Service Uniform (AGSU) "Pinks and Greens."

US Army service caps
ASU Blue Service Uniform
Enlisted & NCO	Sgt. major of the army	Company-grade & warrant officers	Field-grade officer	General officer
Enlisted & NCO	Sgt. major of the army	Company-grade & warrant officers	Field-grade officer	General officer
AGSU "Pinks and Greens" Service Uniform
Enlisted & NCO	Sgt. major of the army	All officers		

==== United States Coast Guard ====
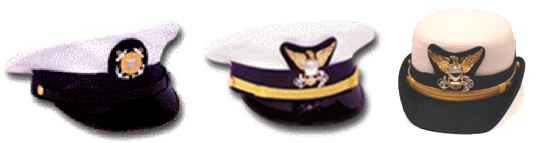
U.S. Coast Guard combination caps (left to right: male enlisted, male officer, female officer)

The United States Coast Guard wears the combination cap, known as the combo cover, with the service dress blue uniform (SDBs), the tropical blue uniform (trops), and with all other formal dress uniforms. The cover is identical to that of the US Navy with respect to the chinstrap and peak ornamentation. Its crown is white. The buttons securing the chin strap to the sides of the band are smaller versions of the buttons worn on the Coast Guard's uniform coats. The blue band around the cap includes blue fabric extending upward on the front of the crown to serve as a backing behind the device. In the case of enlisted personnel, this extension is a blue circle identical to that on the caps of naval officers and chief petty officers. In the case of commissioned officers, however, the extension is a more elaborate polygon to accommodate the officers' cap device.

Unlike their naval counterparts, coast guardsmen below the rank of chief petty officer wear combination covers; their cap device is a golden representation of the Coast Guard emblem. Coast Guard chief petty officers' cap devices match those of the navy, albeit with a shield on the front of the fouled anchor; like navy chiefs, their cap devices are enlarged renderings of the rank insignia worn on their collars. Coast Guard officers' cap device is an eagle with wings outstretched, above an anchor grasped horizontally in its talons.

Female coast guardsmen wear the "bucket hat" style combination cap which has been the standard since female USCG members were called SPARS during World War II. The USCG has investigated allowing a unisex combination cover based on the male cover as the USN has done, but has not yet allowed it.

US Coast Guard combination cap
Bender Blues uniform
Chief petty officer	Senior chief petty officer	Master chief petty officer	MCPOCG
Chief petty officer	Senior chief petty officer	Master chief petty officer	
Enlisted	Warrant and junior officer	Senior officer	Flag officer
Enlisted	Warrant and junior officer	Senior officer	Flag officer

==== United States Marine Corps ====
In the United States Marine Corps, these caps, bearing a cap badge of the corps's Eagle, Globe, and Anchor (EGA) device, are worn in two forms.

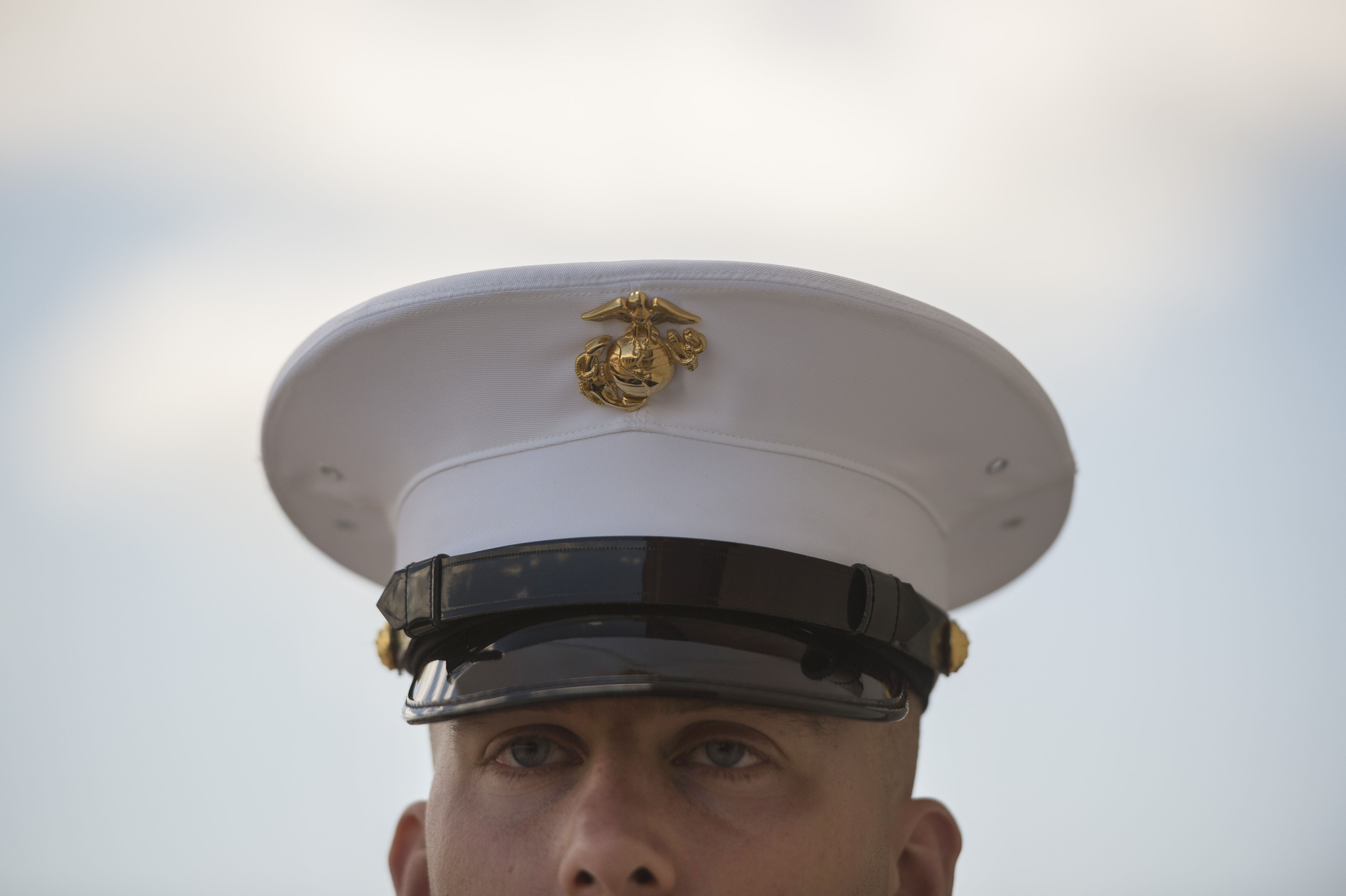
Enlisted

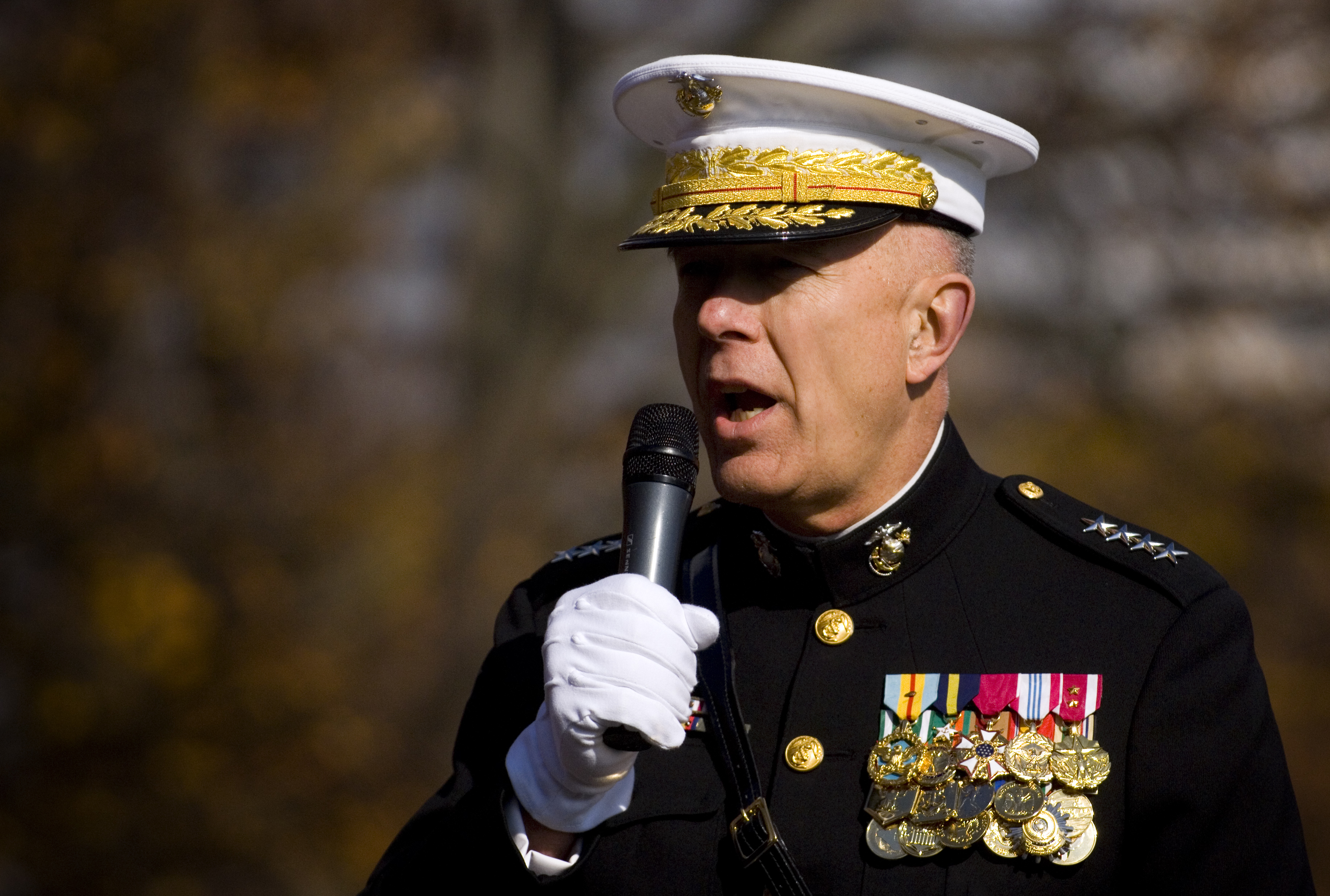
Commandant of the Marine Corps

Variants of the US Marine Corps's peaked cap

For blue dress uniforms, the cap is white with a gloss black visor. The enlisted version features a black chin strap and is worn with an all-gold EGA device, while the officer version features a gold and scarlet chinstrap and a gold and silver EGA device. In addition, officers have a mohair braid wrapped around the band and wear a lace cross on the top, called the quatrefoil, a traditional mark of distinction that Marine Corps lore states enables sharpshooters aboard ships to identify friendly officers from foes.

For the green service uniforms, an olive drab combination cap is available; the EGA device and the chin strap are black for all ranks. In both cases, field-grade officers (majors, lieutenant colonels and colonels) have gold oak leaf motifs on the visor, similar to those worn by navy commanders and captains, while general officers' caps have a different, larger oak leaf motif on the visor. Again officers have a mohair braid wrapped around the band. Additionally the blue dress cap of the commandant of the Marine Corps (as well as the chairman of the Joint Chiefs of Staff, if they are also a marine) adds an additional gold oak leaf motif to the front of the band. In the Marine Corps, the combination cap is commonly referred to as the "barracks cover", and the particular versions are referred to as the dress cap or service cap in Marine Corps orders.

Prior to 2013, female marines wore a different cover, with a bucket style appearance. The sole manufacturer discontinued the cover due to filing for bankruptcy. The Marine Corps in turn proposed having only one service cover, using the current male cover. Female marines were required to switch from the old "bucket" caps to the standard unisex cover in 2022. Erroneously it was reported that the USMC contemplated reverting to a cover used in the early 20th century, dubbed the "Dan Daly," after the twice Medal of Honor recipient's iconic photo with the cover.

US Marine Corps service covers
Dress blue uniform
Enlisted, NCO, SNCO	Company-grade officer	Field-grade officer	General officer	Commandant
Green service uniform
Enlisted, NCO, SNCO	Company-grade officer	Field-grade officer	General officer	Commandant

==== United States Navy ====
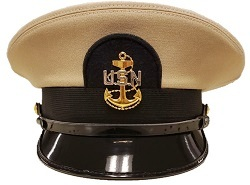
US Navy chief

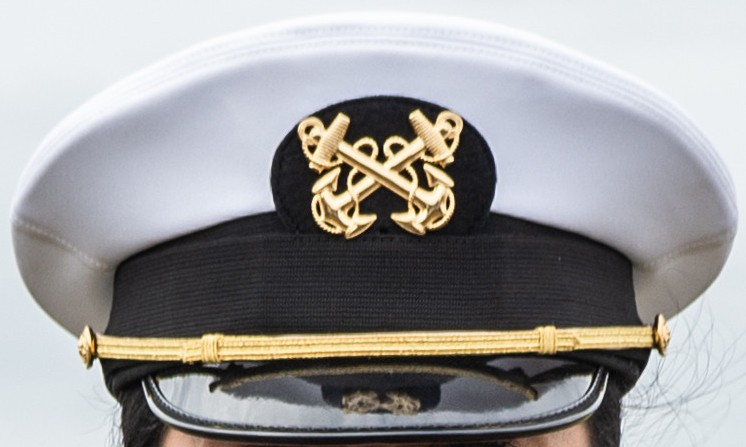
Warrant officer 1

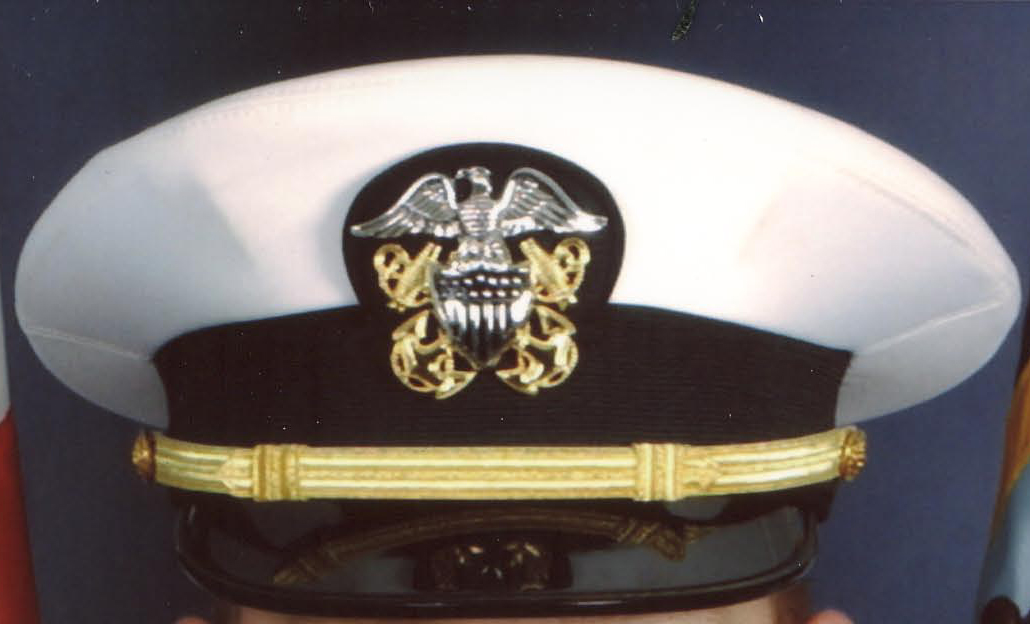
Chief warrant officer and junior officer

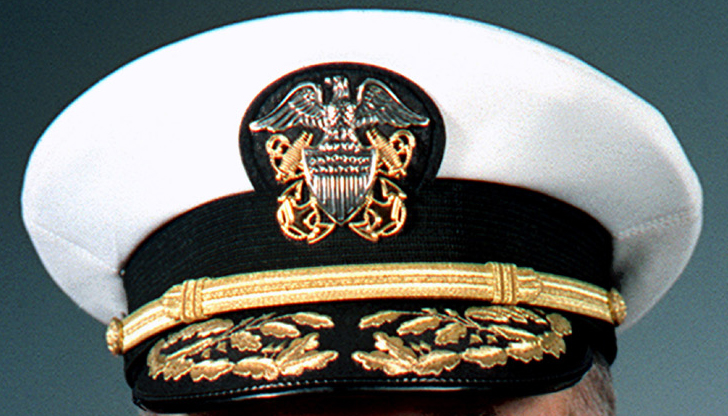
Senior officer

Combination covers worn by officers of the United States Navy.

In the United States Navy, midshipmen, chief petty officers, and commissioned officers wear combination covers, but there are differences between the three types. In general, the cap has a rigid framed crown with a cloth cover, a black hatband that extends to a semicircle on the grant to support a badge, a glossy black visor, and a chinstrap secured by two gold-colored buttons that match the buttons of the wearer's service dress uniform.

Midshipmen at the United States Naval Academy, United States Merchant Marine Academy or in Naval Reserve Officers Training Corps units wear a gold fouled anchor device and have a gold chinstrap. Chief petty officers wear a cap badge consisting of a gold fouled anchor with silver block letters "USN" superimposed on the shank of the anchor, with the addition of one, two, or three stars at the top of the anchor if the wearer is a senior chief petty officer, a master chief petty officer, or the master chief petty officer of the navy, respectively, and have a black chinstrap. Commissioned officers wear an officer's badge consisting of a silver federal shield over two crossed gold fouled anchors surmounted by a silver eagle and have a gold chinstrap. Additionally, officers of rank commander and captain have gold embroidered oak leaves and acorns on a black felt-covered visor, referred to as "scrambled eggs", with additional embroidery for flag officers.

The covering fabric is khaki for use with the service khaki uniform or in white for use with blue and white uniforms (the use of blue fabric for use with blue uniforms was discontinued in 1963). Beginning in 1942, the Navy adopted a female combination cap, often called a "bucket cap." The cap was to be eliminated in 2018 in favor of a unisex version of the standard "male" combination cap, but pushback from female chiefs and officers forced the USN to bring the bucket cap back. Since October 2018 the same cap style is authorized for use by both males and females, but female chiefs and officers may wear the optional bucket-style cap.

US Navy combination covers
Dress white uniform
Chief petty officer	Senior chief petty officer	Master chief petty officer	MCPON
Chief petty officer	Senior chief petty officer	Master chief petty officer	
Warrant officer one	Warrant and junior officer	Senior officer	Flag officer
Warrant officer one	Warrant and junior officer	Senior officer	Flag officer
Service uniform
Chief petty officer	Senior chief petty officer	Master chief petty officer	MCPON
Chief petty officer	Senior chief petty officer	Master chief petty officer	
Warrant officer one	Warrant and junior officer	Senior officer	Flag officer
Warrant officer one	Warrant and junior officer	Senior officer	Flag officer

== Civilian usage ==
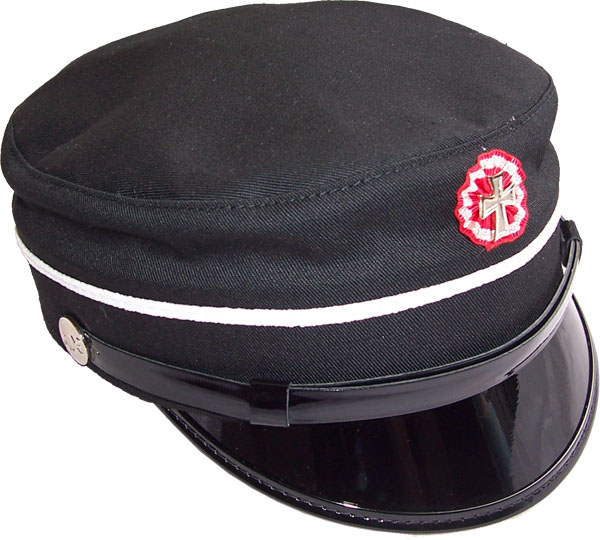
Student cap

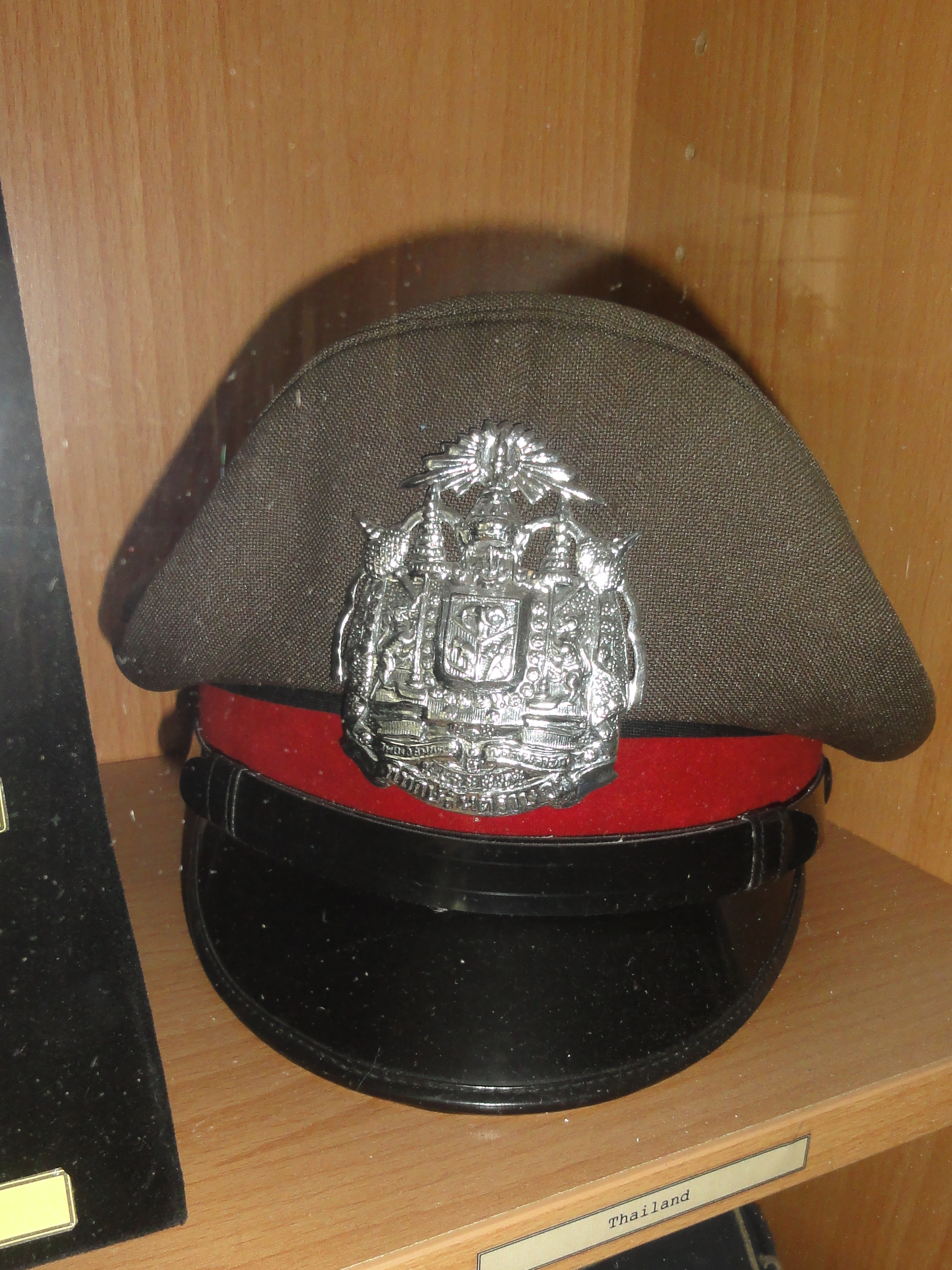
Royal Thai Police peaked cap

Peaked caps are worn in several civilian professions.

Public safety officers, such as those from the police, fire department, ambulance service, and customs, often wear peaked caps, especially on formal occasions. In the US, police forces use caps that have softer tops and are not round and rigid in form (notable are those worn in New York and San Francisco). British and Australian policemen have a checkerboard pattern on the cap band, and traffic wardens often have a reflective yellow strip.

A number of civilian professions—the most notable modern examples being merchant marine and civil aviation—also wear peaked caps. In such civilian old traditional usage, only captains aboard ships and pilots in command (airline captains) in service aboard aircraft, have the golden oak leaf motifs ("scrambled eggs") on the visor; this is in contrast to the naval tradition, where it is also worn by commanders (one rank below captain) as well as by commodores and flag officers.

The original civilian variant of the peaked cap was widely worn by sailors and workers from the mid 19th century onwards. These were made of wool or canvas, and sometimes waterproofed with tar. During the 1960s, blue denim Greek fisherman's caps became an essential accessory for the counterculture due to their use by John Lennon of the Beatles. A black leather version, sometimes embellished with chains or metal studs, was worn by bikers, greasers imitating Marlon Brando in The Wild One, and members of the 1970s Black Power movement.

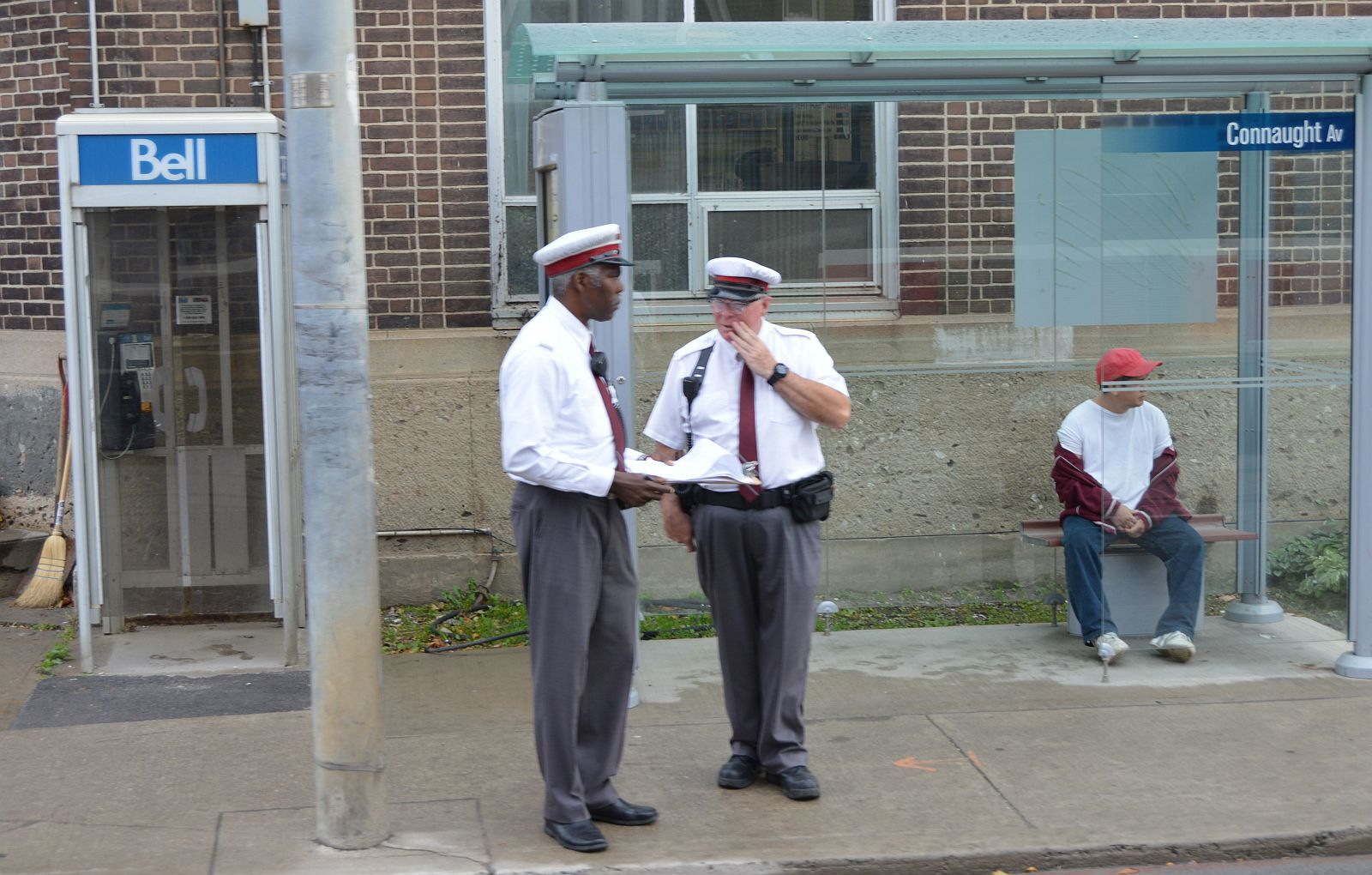
Toronto Transit Commission staff wearing peaked caps

Peaked caps are also commonly worn around the world by some railway, or airport staff (baggage porters, but often wearing kepi type cap), bus drivers and security guards. A peaked cap is a part of the Salvation Army uniform in most of the territories it operates in.

Student caps in Northern and Central European countries are frequently peaked caps. The student caps in Nordic countries are traditionally white (summer uniform) or black (winter uniform) but the colors of the bands, lining, tassels and cockades differ, depending on the school or the faculty. In German-speaking countries and in Poland, Estonia and Latvia, student caps come in a variety of colors, depending on the colors of the student organization or the school, and can be decorated with its zirkel (a monogram).

=== Canada ===
The uniforms for several civilian services in Canada incorporate a peaked cap. The Canadian Coast Guard shares a similar cap and colours with the Royal Canadian Navy.

Police forces across Canada also wear a peaked cap as a part of their dress uniforms or operational uniforms. Police peaked caps are typically coloured black with coloured cap band. The RCMP uses a yellow cap band, the Ontario Provincial Police uses a blue colour cap band, and the Sûreté du Québec uses a green band with yellow piping. Several other municipal police services in Canada use a red cap band.

=== Hong Kong and Macau ===
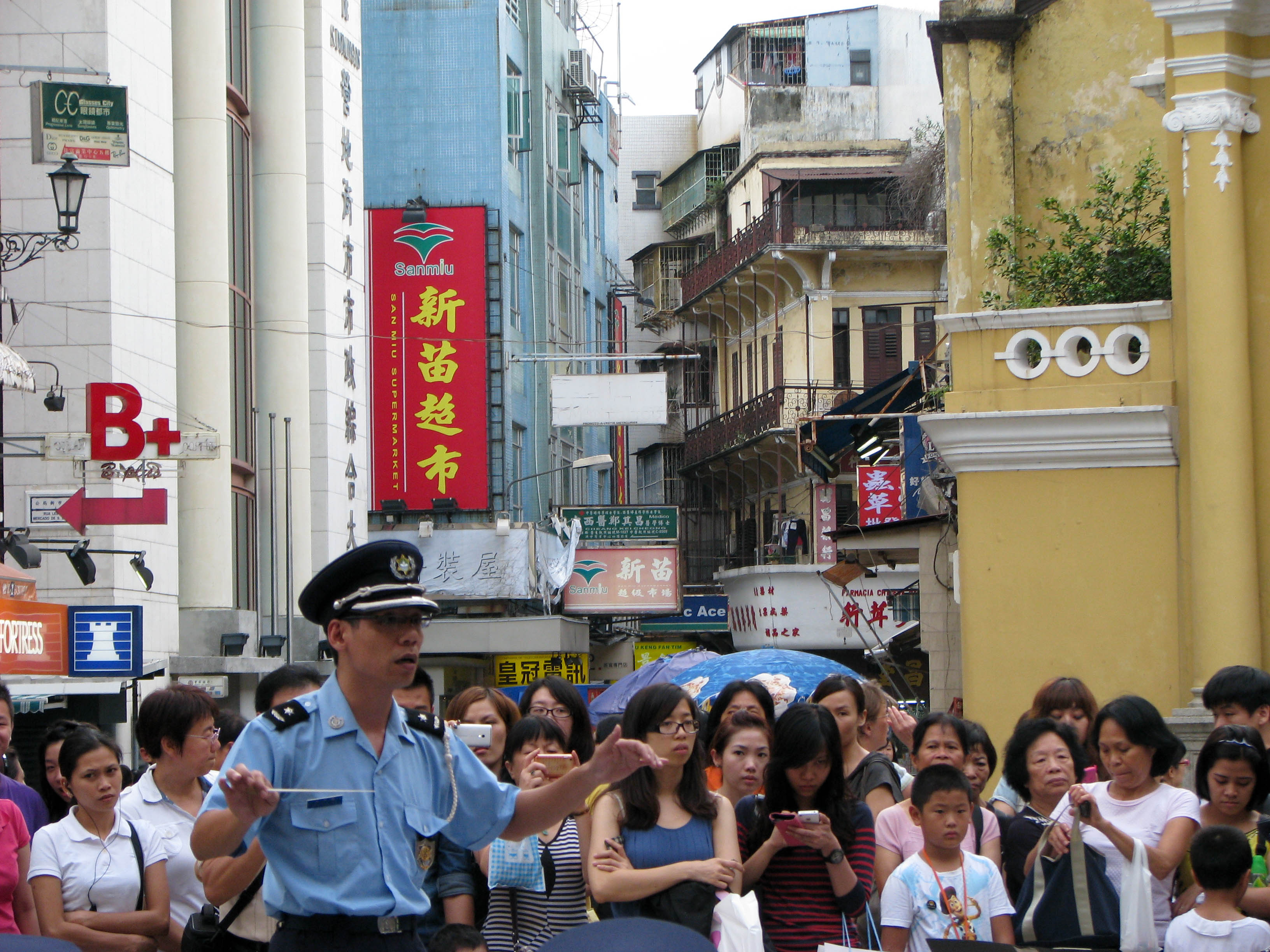
A police officer in Macau wearing a peaked cap

The peaked cap and peaked hat are worn as formal dress by members of the Hong Kong Disciplined Services (police, fire, customs/excise, immigration, etc.) with influence from the British colonial services. All caps use black as base colour. The crown is flat and round in shape. Female police officers' caps have a coloured band, no crown top and front of the brim is flat with sides/back folded upwards. Only members of the Hong Kong Police's Tactical units, Emergency unit, and motorcycle officers do not wear the peaked cap when on duty.

Members of the Hong Kong Sea Cadet Corps, Hong Kong Adventure Corps and Hong Kong Air Cadet Corps (including the Ceremonial Squadron) use the British-based cap.

The dress uniforms for the Public Security Police Force of Macau and the Corpo de Bombeiros de Macau utilises a peaked cap. However, most police officers in Macau wear berets or ball caps for patrol.

=== United Kingdom ===
Peaked caps are used by a number of civilian services in the United Kingdom. His Majesty's Prison Service and British ambulance services do not currently issue peaked caps to be worn on duty, although they formerly did so. However, peaked caps are still worn with formal uniform on ceremonial occasions.

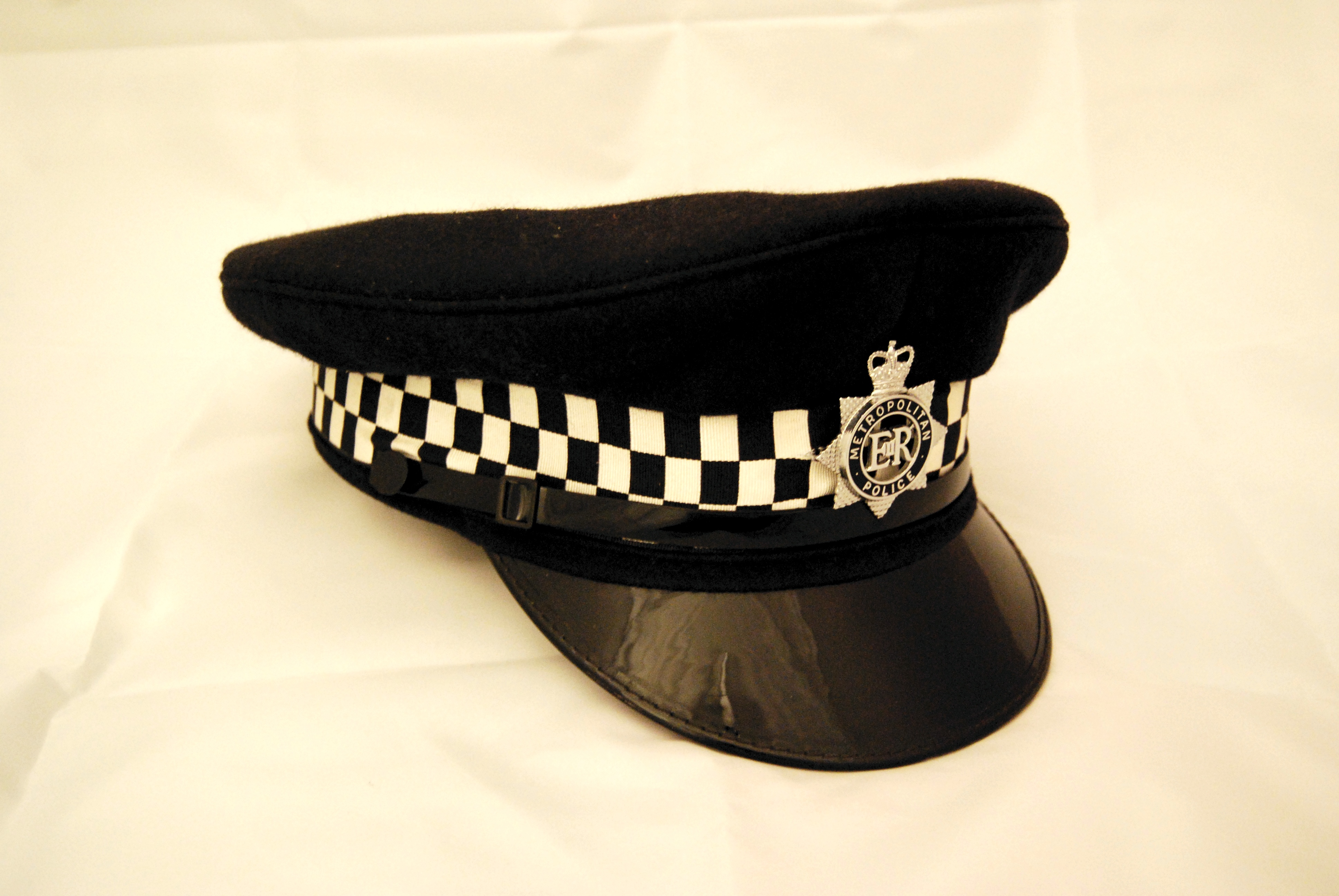
A peaked cap used by the Metropolitan Police

==== Police ====
Basic headgear for male police officers in the UK is a peaked cap. This includes a cap badge and generally has a black and white diced band (called Sillitoe tartan) around the cap. Caps worn by traffic police officers have white crowns or covers. Female officers in the Police Service of Northern Ireland also wear a peaked cap of a different shape; the same pattern was also worn by female officers of the Royal Ulster Constabulary and formerly by female officers of some other British police forces.

Caps are also part of the uniforms of male police community support officers (PCSOs), who wear a plain light blue band.

==== Ministry of Defence Guard Service ====
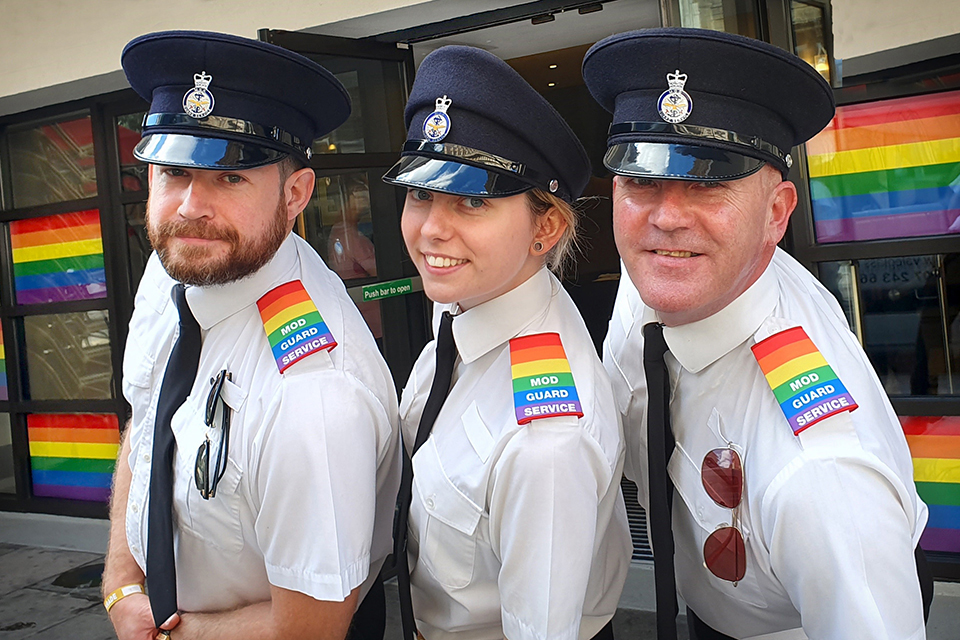
Ministry of Defence Guard Service officers wearing both male and female versions of their issued cap

The Ministry of Defence Guard Service currently issues a peaked cap that is a dark shade of navy blue with a leather chin strap and MGS cap badge on the front to all of its male officers. Female officers are issued with a peaked cap of a different shape similar to that of female soldiers. Dog section officers traditionally wear a beret.

The cap badge consists of the Ministry of Defence emblem in the centre backed by silver with a navy blue border encircling the emblem that contains text that reads 'Ministry of Defence Guard Service', all below a crown.

==== Fire services ====
Members of British fire services wear standard peaked caps. Female members wear identical caps to male members. Before the Second World War, some British fire brigades, including the London Fire Brigade, wore the peakless Brodrick cap, which had formerly been worn by the British Army. However, when all fire brigades were amalgamated into the National Fire Service in 1941 it adopted the peaked cap, and this was retained when it was disbanded in 1948 and separate fire brigades were again formed by each local authority.

=== United States ===
==== Public Health Service Commissioned Corps and NOAA Commissioned Corps ====
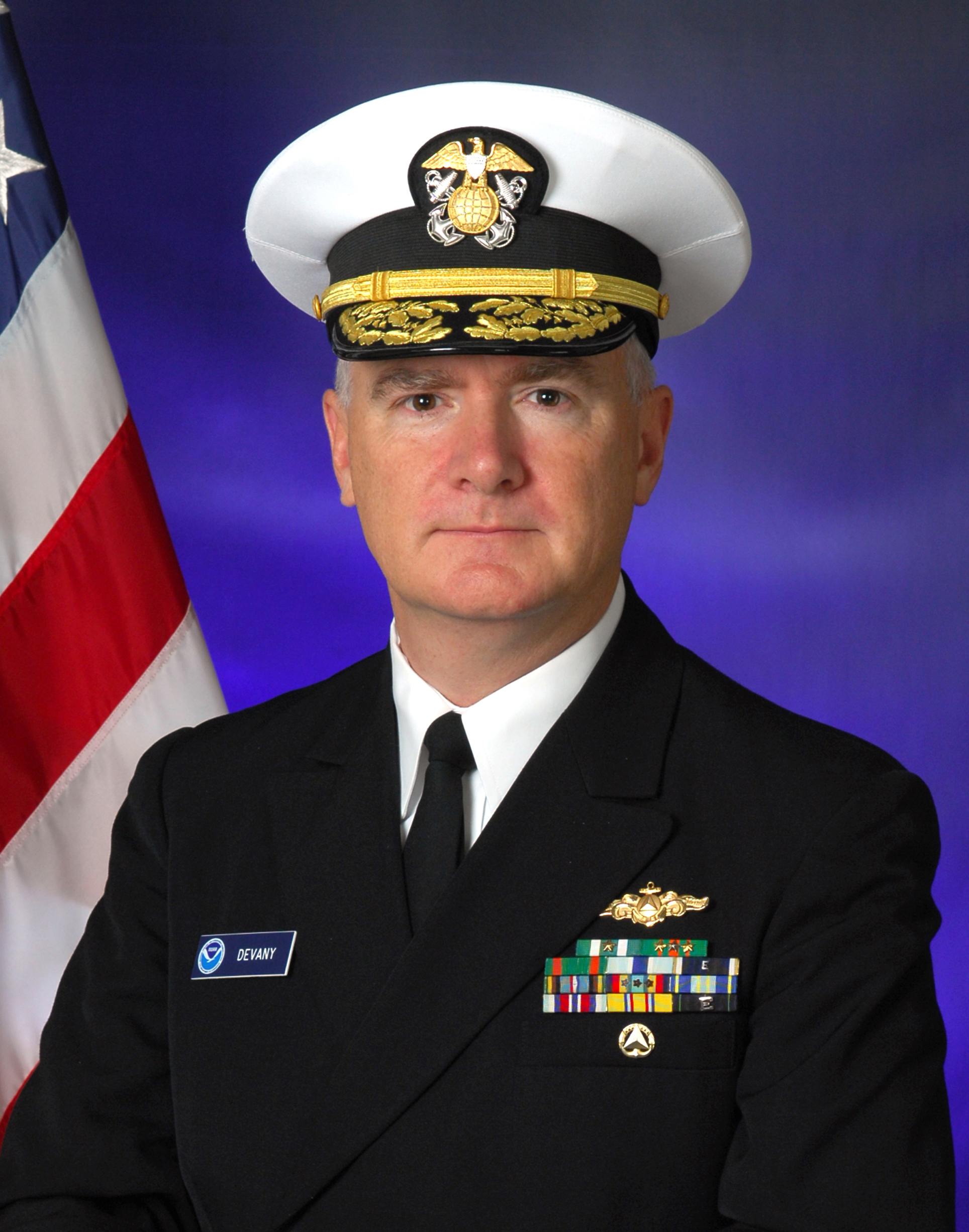
Rear Admiral Michael S. Devany, National Oceanic and Atmospheric Administration

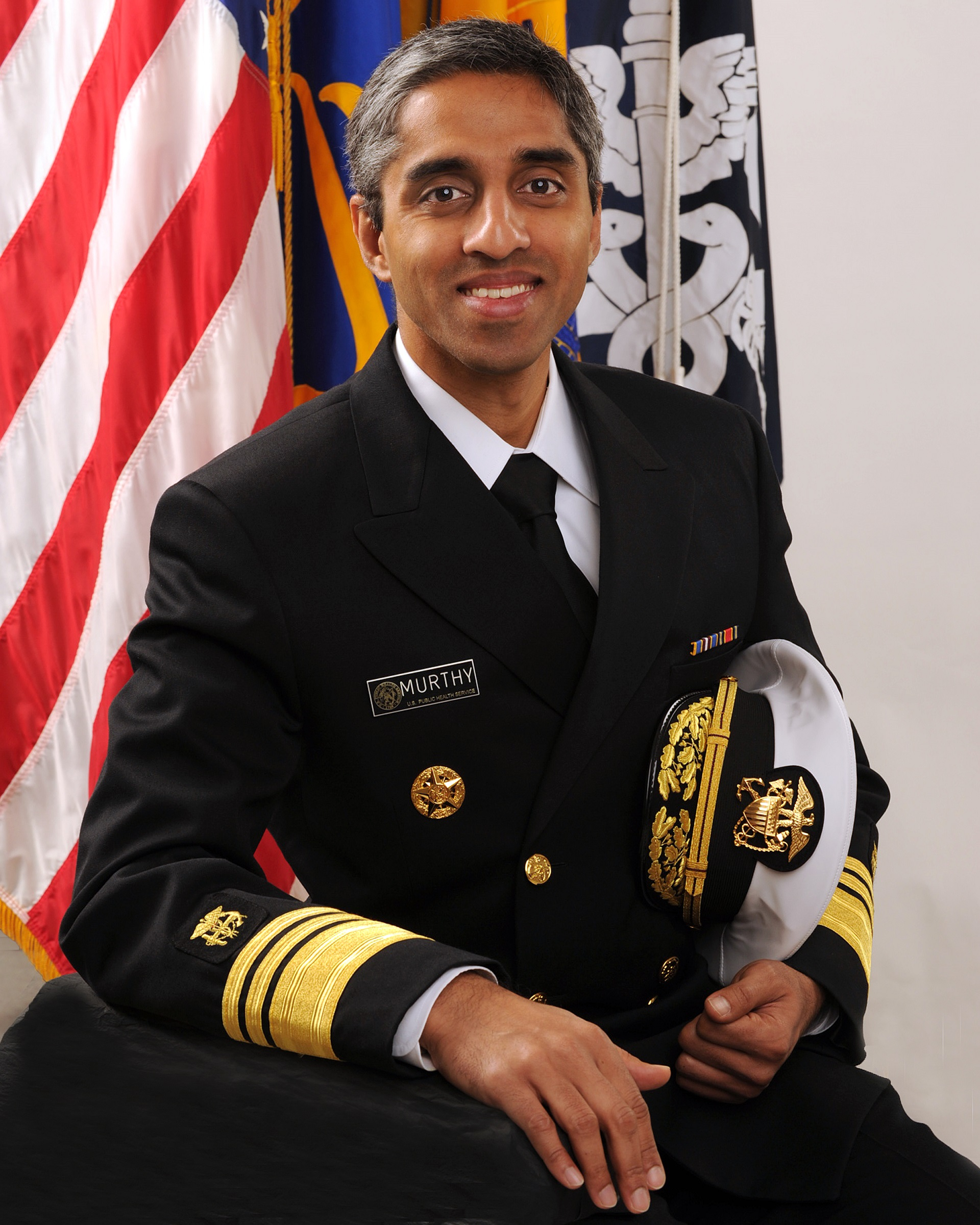
Vice Admiral Vivek Murthy, United States Public Health Service Commissioned Corps

Officers of the unarmed uniformed services of the United States wear peaked caps as a part of their uniform.

The United States Public Health Service Commissioned Corps and the National Oceanic and Atmospheric Administration Commissioned Corps—the two small services, consisting only of officers, which are the two uniformed services that are not armed forces—wear uniforms and rank insignia adopted from the United States Navy. The combination covers of the two services are identical to those of the Navy with respect to colors, and peak ornamentation. The chinstrap of the PHS is gold with a burgundy stripe. The buttons securing the chin strap to the sides of the band are smaller versions of the buttons worn on the services' uniform coats. The cap device of NOAACC officers is similar to that of Navy officers with a globe in place of the shield; the cap device of PHSCC officers is similar to that of Navy officers but has a caduceus in place of one of the anchors.

The USPHS and NOAA officers generally wear the dress (whites and blues) and duty uniforms (khaki) of the U.S. Navy. They wear the Coast Guard Working Uniform (CGWU) as a fatigue uniform. And so they wear the same peaked combination covers that the Navy wears in white and khaki. The embellishments are also the same. The only main difference is the USPHS cap insignia is a crossed caduceus and anchor with and eagle and shield above all in gold or the NOAA globe over crossed anchors under the American eagle. The USPHS and NOAA do not have either enlisted or warrant officers.

USPHS and NOAA combination covers
USPHS Dress Uniforms			NOAA Dress Uniform		
Junior officer	Senior officer	Flag officer	Junior officer	Senior officer	Flag officer
Junior officer	Senior officer	Flag officer	Junior officer	Senior officer	Flag officer
USPHS Khaki Service Uniform			NOAA Khaki Service Uniform		
Junior officer	Senior officer	Flag officer	Junior officer	Senior officer	Flag officer
Junior officer	Senior officer	Flag officer	Junior officer	Senior officer	Flag officer

==== United States Maritime Service ====
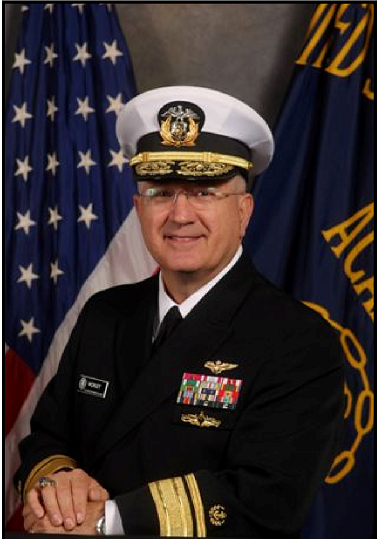
Rear Admiral Allen B. Worley with a peaked cap of the United States Maritime Service

While the majority of American merchant mariners are employed by shipping businesses and accordingly wear either uniforms prescribed by their employers or civilian attire, some officers receive commissions in the United States Maritime Service for federal government duty, such as the faculty of the United States Merchant Marine Academy and the Military Sealift Command's civilian officers manning non-commissioned United States Naval Ships. These officers wear uniforms and rank insignia adopted from the U.S. Navy, albeit with United States Merchant Marine's own button design, cap device, awards, and decorations. The combination covers these officers are identical to those of naval officer with respect to colors, chinstrap and peak ornamentation. The buttons securing the chin strap to the sides of the band are smaller versions of the buttons worn on their coats. The USMS cap device is a rendering of the Merchant Marine device in gold- and silver-colored metal. Like the device worn by naval officers, it features a silver eagle, with wings outstretched, above a gold shield; the shield, however, is defaced with an anchor and surrounded by a wreath.

United States Maritime Service Combination Covers
Junior officer	Senior officer	Flag officer

== Variants ==
A typical peaked cap has a spring stiffening, often in the form of a wire grommet frame, to ensure the sides and rear of the fabric covering have the proper shape. A crusher cap removes the stiffener to allow headphones to be worn over the hat or use in confined spaces such as tanks and submarines, giving it a slouched and worn "crushed" appearance. Such modified caps were especially popular among US Army Air Force's combat pilots and German tank commanders and submariners in the Second World War.

A mariner's cap is another form of headwear similar to a peaked cap.

== See also ==
- List of hat styles
- Mariner's cap
- Prince Henry cap
- Headgear of the United States Army
