= List of Australian Army Corps =

A corps in the Australian Army is an administrative group that comprises members with similar work functions.

== Corps ==
=== Current ===
The following is a list of the 23 Corps of the Australian Army, ordered according to the traditional seniority of all the Corps.

- Corps of Staff Cadets
- Royal Australian Armoured Corps
- Royal Australian Artillery
- Royal Australian Engineers
- Royal Australian Corps of Signals
- Royal Australian Infantry Corps
- Australian Army Aviation Corps
- Australian Intelligence Corps
- Royal Australian Army Chaplains Department
- Royal Australian Corps of Transport
- Royal Australian Army Medical Corps
- Royal Australian Army Dental Corps
- Royal Australian Army Ordnance Corps
- Royal Australian Electrical and Mechanical Engineers
- Royal Australian Army Educational Corps
- Australian Army Public Relations Service
- Australian Army Catering Corps
- Royal Australian Army Pay Corps
- Australian Army Legal Corps
- Royal Australian Corps of Military Police
- Australian Army Psychology Corps
- Australian Army Band Corps
- Royal Australian Army Nursing Corps

=== Disbanded ===
- Women's Royal Australian Army Corps
- Royal Australian Survey Corps
- Royal Australian Army Service Corps
- Australian Instructional Corps
- Australian Cycling Corps
- Australian Staff Corps
- Australian Army Veterinary Corps
- Australian Machine Gun Corps
- Australian Mining Corps

== See also ==
- Structure of the Australian Army
- List of Australian Army regiments
- List of Australian military bases
