= Royal Australian Army Pay Corps =

Administrative corps of the Australian Army

- Active: 21 September 1914 – present
- Country: Australia
- Branch: Australian Army
- Motto: Integrity
- Colors: Yellow and blue

The Royal Australian Army Pay Corps (RAAPC) is an Administrative Corps of the Australian Army. Its role is to provide financial advice and assistance to the Australian Army.

== History ==
The Australian Army Pay Corps (AAPC) was originally formed on 21 September 1914 with MAJ Albert G. Farr being appointed as the commanding officer of the 1st Australian Army Pay Details Unit. It consisted of three officers and 22 Other Ranks who deployed to the Middle East on 21 October 1914. The first chief paymaster was LTCOL Thomas W. Jolliffe, CMG.

The AAPC served in all theatres of World War I as well as staffing the Paymaster’s Branch in London. Authority to raise Home Forces Citizen Pay Units was provided in 1916, which is currently celebrated as the origin of the corps. However, it was disbanded on 21 June 1921 with pay duties reverting to civilian employees in military districts and to Pay Sergeants in the Militia.

As the threat of a new war approached a small nucleus of the AAPC was reformed consisting of 40 part-time Citizens Military Force officers. It would be the basis for expansion although there was a significant shortage of suitably trained personnel until 1943. Correcting this shortage is best illustrated by a true story of a group of recruits at the time: “Prove anyone who worked in a bank”. One man stepped forward and was promptly transferred to the AAPC. It was later discovered that he was a lift driver in the city headquarters of a bank. However he proved his worth, later being commissioned.

The Chief Paymaster of the 2nd AIF was BRIG G.N. Moore, CBE, DFC, ED, FCA who was appointed on 13 November 1939. He and the advance party of the AAPC departed for the Middle East on 15 December 1939. The initial Imprest Account was £1 000, raised to £50 000 upon arrival in Jerusalem. AAPC personnel accompanied each division and by June 1940 opened in London to service 9th Division.

In addition to the Divisional Field Pay Offices AAPC personnel served in a total of 103 Cash offices and distributed over £202 000 000 by the end of the war. Over 7 000 soldiers served in the corps, providing services to 3 200 units. With the exception of those required for service with the occupational forces in Japan, the Corps was again disbanded in 1946.

May 1948 saw the re-raising of the AAPC within the CMF as Detachments in each state. On 27 October that same year the title ‘Royal’ was granted to the corps in recognition of the services provided by the Pay Corps personnel in both wars.

During the Vietnam War the RAAPC provided pay support to Australian soldiers in Saigon, Nui Dat and Vung Tau. The first Financial Adviser posted to Vietnam was LTCOL W.T.A. Murphy with CAPTs Parker, Gow and Mahomet being the first Paymasters in the Cash Offices. Simultaneously Corps personnel served in Cash Offices located in Singapore and Malaya. Later this support was extended to cover SEATO exercises in Thailand, the Philippines and the survey operations conducted throughout Indonesia and West Irian.

In 1990 the Australian Regular Army component formed. Since then its personnel have served as part of Australian forces in many countries.

== Order of precedence ==
| Preceded by Australian Army Catering Corps | Australian Army Order of Precedence | Succeeded by Australian Army Legal Corps |
