= Australian Army Psychology Corps =

Administrative corps of the Australian Army

- Badge
- Active: 15 October 1952 – present
- Country: Australia
- Branch: Army
- Type: Corps

Insignia
- Abbreviation: AA Psych

The Australian Army Psychology Corps (AA Psych Corps) is the branch of the Australian Army responsible for providing psychological care to Army personnel. Unique at the time in the British Commonwealth, the corps was formed on 15 October 1952, replacing the Australian Army Psychology Service which was formed in 1945.

On 19 November 2021, the 1st Psychology Unit was disbanded and integrated into four new health battalions. The unit was raised in March 1963 and could trace its lineage to the Army Psychology Service.

The Australian Army Psychology Corps (AA Psych Corps) Regular Army component, comprises approximately 65 uniformed officers who are all psychologists.

== Notes ==
Preceded by Royal Australian Corps of Military Police	Australian Army Order of Precedence	Succeeded by Australian Army Band Corps
