= Australian Army Legal Corps =

Administrative corps of the Australian Army

- Country: Australia
- Branch: Australian Army
- Type: Corps
- Motto(s): Justitia in Armis (Justice in Arms)

The Australian Army Legal Corps (AALC) consists of Regular and Reserve commissioned officers that provide specific legal advice to commanders and general legal advice to all ranks. They must be admitted to practice as Australian Legal Practitioners.

Legal officers can specialise in operational law (such as the laws of war and international humanitarian law, administrative law), and disciplinary law which is derived from the Defence Force Discipline Act.

Legal officers can also appear on behalf of members of the Australian Defence Force charged with service offences, such as stealing firearms, although usually not those heard at Regimental or Battalion level. They can also appear as prosecuting officers as well as assist boards of inquiry. Promotion and level of pay is determined by experience as well as recognised levels of legal competency, which are closely associated with obtaining post-graduate qualifications, such as the Master of Laws specialising in military law through the Australian National University. Many members of the Legal Corps have been appointed as Queen's Counsel or Senior Counsel, and a number have been elevated to various Australian courts (including county, district courts, and state supreme courts).

== Order of Precedence ==
Preceded by Royal Australian Army Pay Corps	Australian Army Order of Precedence	Succeeded by Royal Australian Corps of Military Police

== See also ==
- Judge Advocate General's Corps
