= Corps of Staff Cadets =

Administrative corps of the Australian Army

- Badge
- Country: Australia
- Branch: Army
- Type: Corps
- Role: Officer Training
- Size: 5 Companies
- Garrison/HQ: Duntroon
- March: "The Staff Cadet" (quick march), "General Bridges" (slow march)

Commanders
- Notable commanders: Major General William Bridges (general)

The Corps of Staff Cadets (CSC) is a corps of the Australian Army. It is ranked first in the Order of Precedence ahead of the Royal Australian Armoured Corps. The CSC is the corps to which all officer trainees, known as staff cadets, who attend the Royal Military College, Duntroon are allocated once they have completed their initial stage of training in III Class, known as Initial Cadet Training. Upon completion of this training, which lasts between six and eight weeks, the successful III Class cadets are welcomed into the Corps and presented with their Corps lanyard at what is known as the "Lanyard Parade". The name of the Corps of Staff Cadets is derived from the earliest history of the College, which was set up in 1911 to train officers to fill positions in the now defunct Staff Corps. Currently, however, following graduation, the cadet is promoted to the rank of lieutenant and allocated to a combat, combat support or combat service support corps, such as the Royal Australian Infantry Corps, Royal Australian Engineers, Royal Australian Armoured Corps, Royal Australian Corps of Transport, Royal Australian Artillery, etc.

== Role ==
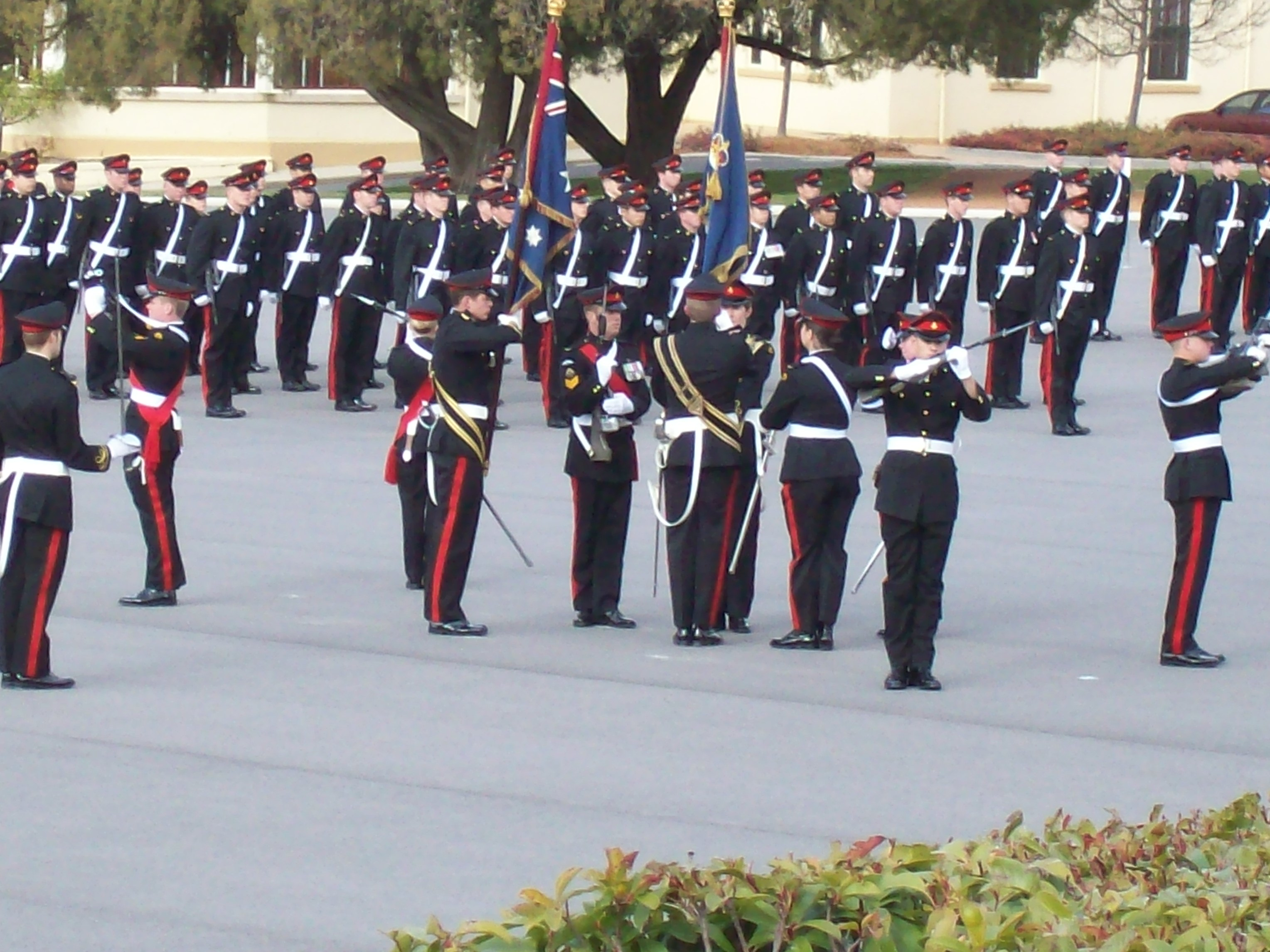
Graduation parade at Duntroon, June 2008

The role of the Corps of Staff Cadets is to train officers of the Australian Army, as well as Ground Defence Officers of the Royal Australian Air Force.

== Organisation ==
The Corps of Staff Cadets currently consists of five companies named for a battle or campaign famous in Australian history:

- Alamein Company
- Gallipoli Company
- Kapyong Company
- Kokoda Company
- Long Tan Company

Another company, Bridges Company, is named for Major General William Bridges.

== Order of precedence ==
Preceded by None	Australian Army Order of Precedence	Succeeded by Royal Australian Armoured Corps
