= List of Australian Army regiments =

The following is a list of current regiments of the Australian Army, listed by Corps and service type.

== Armour ==
=== Regular Army ===
- 1st Armoured Regiment
- 2nd Cavalry Regiment
- 2nd/14th Light Horse Regiment (Queensland Mounted Infantry)

=== Army Reserve ===
- 12th/16th Hunter River Lancers
- 1st/15th Royal New South Wales Lancers
- 4th/19th Prince of Wales's Light Horse
- 3rd/9th Light Horse (South Australian Mounted Rifles)
- 10th Light Horse Regiment

== Artillery ==
=== Regular Army ===
- 1st Regiment, Royal Australian Artillery
- 4th Regiment, Royal Australian Artillery
- 8th/12th Regiment, Royal Australian Artillery
- 16th Regiment, Royal Australian Artillery
- 20th Regiment, Royal Australian Artillery

=== Army Reserve ===
- 9th Regiment, Royal Australian Artillery

== Aviation ==
- 1st Aviation Regiment
- 5th Aviation Regiment
- 6th Aviation Regiment

== Engineers ==
=== Current ===
==== Regular Army ====
- 1st Combat Engineer Regiment
- 2nd Combat Engineer Regiment
- 3rd Combat Engineer Regiment
- 6th Engineer Support Regiment

==== Army Reserve ====
- 5th Engineer Regiment
- 11th Engineer Regiment
- 13th Engineer Regiment
- 22nd Engineer Regiment

==== Special Forces ====
- Special Operations Engineer Regiment

=== Former ===
- 4th Combat Engineer Regiment
- 8th Engineer Regiment
- 21st Construction Regiment
- 22nd Construction Regiment

== Infantry ==
=== Army Reserve ===
- Royal Queensland Regiment
- Royal New South Wales Regiment
- Royal Victoria Regiment
- Royal South Australia Regiment
- Royal Western Australia Regiment
- Royal Tasmania Regiment

=== Regular Army ===
- Royal Australian Regiment

=== Regional Force Surveillance ===
- NORFORCE
- Pilbara Regiment
- Far North Queensland Regiment

=== Special Forces ===
- Special Air Service Regiment
- 1st Commando Regiment
- 2nd Commando Regiment

== Signals ==
=== Regular Army ===
- 1st Signals Regiment
- 1st Combat Signals Regiment
- 3rd Combat Signals Regiment
- 7th Combat Signals Regiment
- 7th Signals Regiment

=== Army Reserve ===
- 8th Signals Regiment

== Reserve training ==
- Adelaide Universities Regiment
- Melbourne University Regiment
- Monash University Regiment
- Queensland University Regiment
- Sydney University Regiment
- University of New South Wales Regiment
- Western Australia University Regiment

== See also ==
- Structure of the Australian Army
- List of Australian Army Corps
