= 21st Construction Regiment (Australia) =

Australian Army engineer unit

21st Construction Engineer Regiment
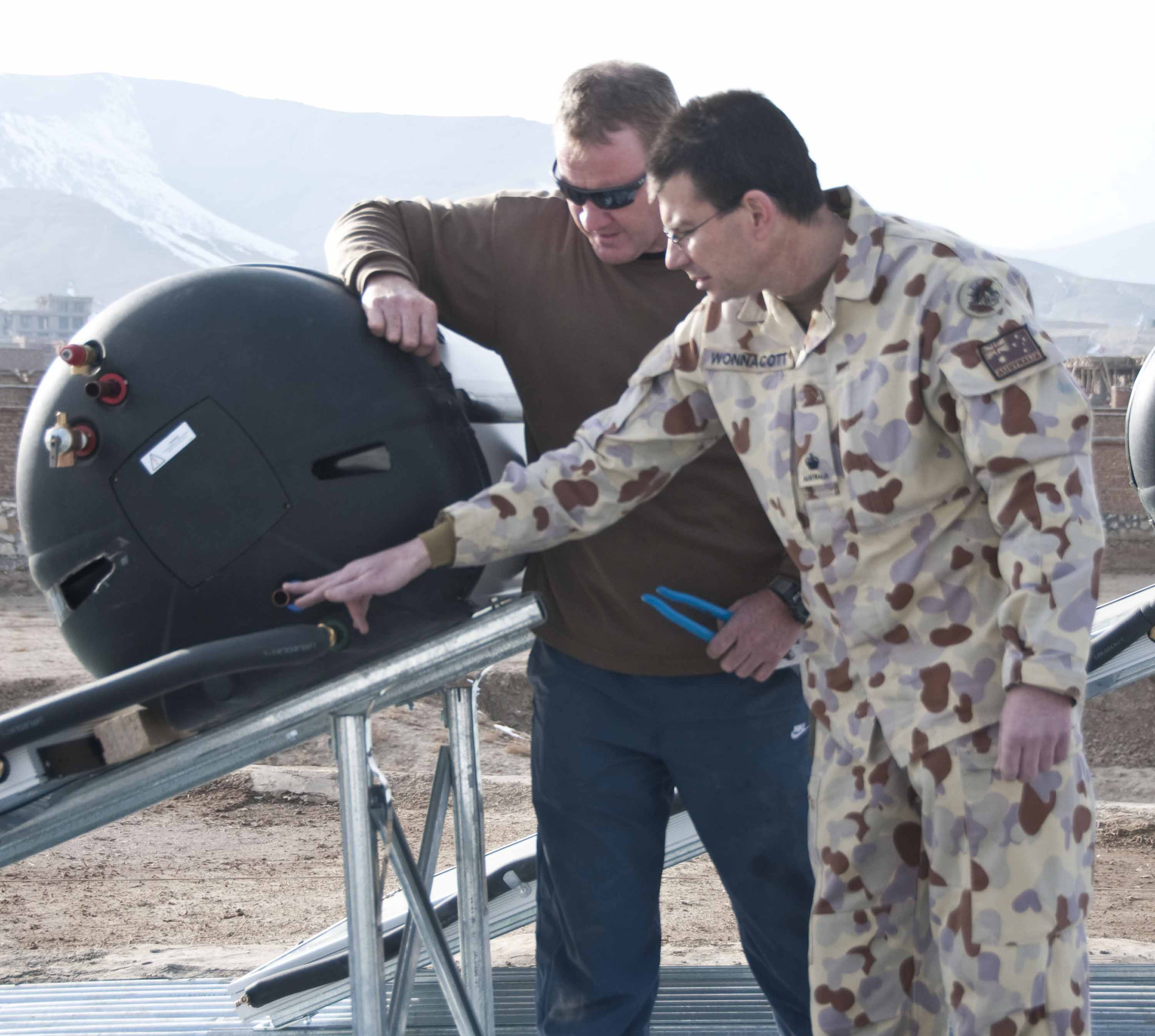
- 21 CR personnel in Afghanistan, 2009
- Active: 1950–2013
- Disbanded: 23 November 2013
- Country: Australia
- Branch: Army
- Type: Royal Australian Engineers (RAE)
- Role: Construction engineers
- Part of: 5th Brigade, 2nd Division
- Garrison/HQ: Holsworthy Barracks

Insignia
- Unit colour patch
- Abbreviation: 21 CR

The 21st Construction Regiment (21 CR) was a construction engineer regiment of the Australian Army Reserve. Part of the 5th Brigade, the regiment was formed in 1950 and was based in New South Wales where it provided support to the 2nd Division. The regiment has contributed personnel to a number of operations including the Regional Assistance Mission to the Solomon Islands, Operation Slipper and Operation Astute. It also regularly supported the Army Aboriginal Community Assistance Program and provided assistance to the Australian community in times of natural disaster. The regiment was disbanded in 2013.

== History ==
The 21st Construction Regiment was raised on 29 August 1950 in New South Wales through the "supplementary reserve" scheme that used the resources of various government departments, including personnel, to raise a reserve military capability within the Citizens Military Force. The regiment's first commanding officer was Lieutenant Colonel Douglas White, a World War II veteran, and upon formation the regiment consisted of the 101st, 102nd and 103rd Construction Squadrons and the 108th Plant Squadron. The following year the 109th Construction Squadron was raised as an independent squadron administered by the regiment. At the regiment's first annual camp in 1951, a total of 29 officers and 163 other ranks paraded.

In 1952, the regiment was subordinated to the 5th Engineer Group, which was headquartered at Victoria Barracks in Sydney. A small number of regular personnel were detached to the regiment to provide training support. In 1958, the regimental headquarters was established at Haberfield, New South Wales. Throughout the 1950s and 60s, the regiment undertook various construction tasks around the country, moving between Middle Head and Singleton. Annual camps took place at Middle Head, North Head, Glenfield, Ingleburn, Holsworthy and Singleton. In 1968, the regiment was placed under the command of 11 CE Works when the 5th Engineer Group disbanded.

In 1972, the 109th Construction Squadron was redesignated 201 Work Section when its sponsor organisation, the Snowy Mountain Hydro Electric Scheme, was completed. The regiment returned to the 5th Engineer Group in 1975. That year the regiment deployed over 350 personnel to Darwin to clean up the city in the wake of Cyclone Tracy.

Two years later, further change occurred when 201 Works Section was redesignated 4 Troop, underneath the 5th Field Squadron, which was part of the 4th Field Engineer Regiment. This lasted until early 1980 when the subunit returned to the 21st Construction Regiment and once again became 201 Works Section. In 1987, the regiment was placed under the command of the 2nd Divisional Engineers. Later that year, the 103rd and 108th Plant Squadrons were disbanded and reformed as the 26th Divisional Engineer Support Squadron. Throughout the 1980s exercises were undertaken in the Holsworthy and Singleton areas; a major bridging project was also completed at Gladesville in Sydney with the support of the regular 17th Construction Squadron.

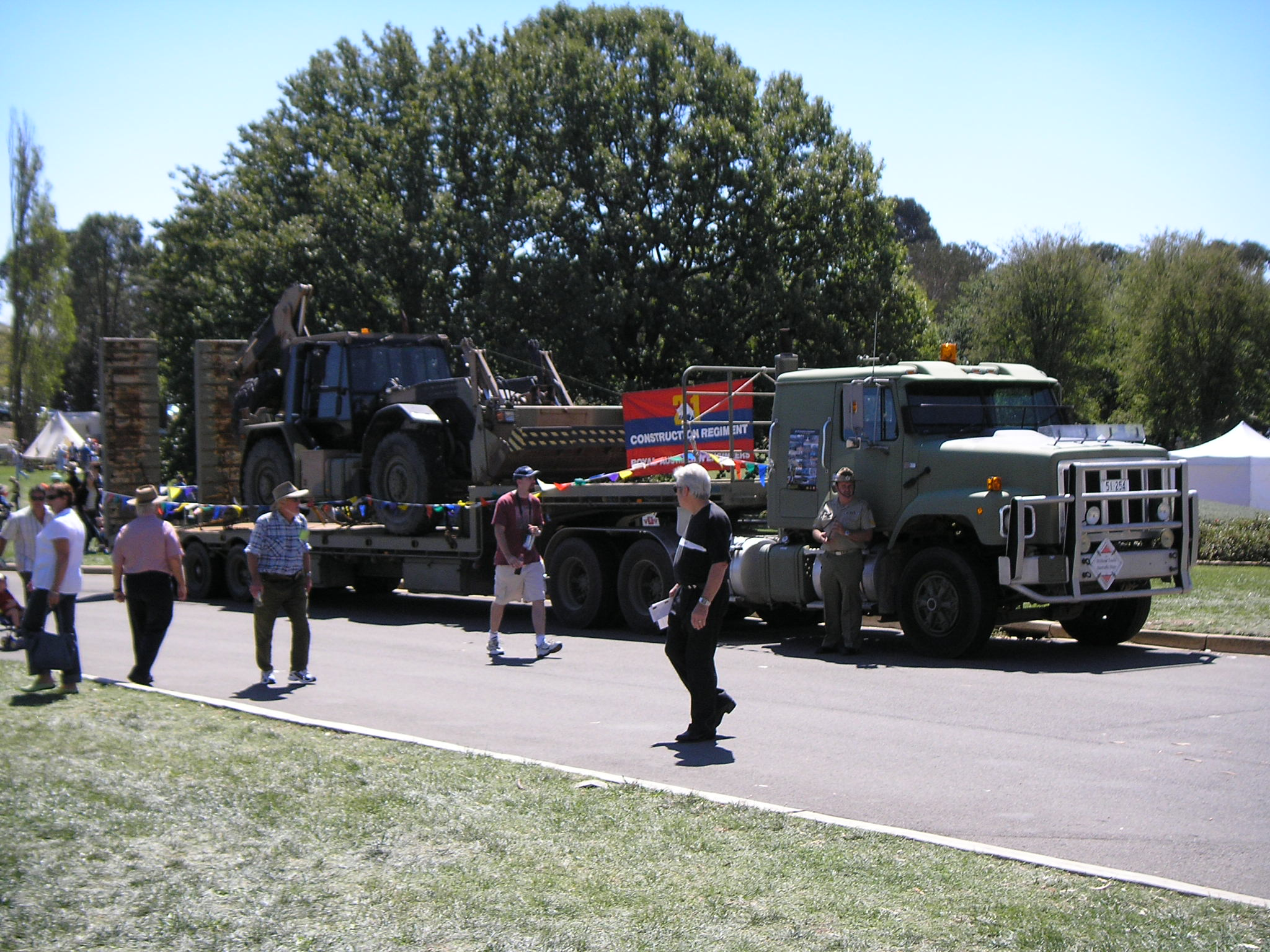
A truck belonging to the 21st Construction Regiment on display at the Australian War Memorial open day in 2007

Up until the 1990s when a centralised training model was adopted, the regiment undertook its own basic, employment and promotion courses. When the regiment had originally been raised under the supplementary reserve scheme, its personnel had been placed under conditions of service that enabled them to serve with only limited impact upon their civilian careers. This was done by allowing members only to parade for one annual two week camp a year. These conditions remained until 1995 when its personnel became subject to the same requirements of other Reserve units, which essentially required members to attend weekly parades and monthly exercises. In 1996, the regiment was issued with a unit colour patch that consisted of the purple background of the engineers and a red triangle. Throughout the 1990s, annual camps were undertaken in Rylestone, Shoalwater Bay, Holsworthy, Singleton, Port Wakefield, Goat Island, Majura, and Kapooka.

The regiment was heavily deployed since the beginning of the 21st century, with personnel being deployed on operations as part of the Regional Assistance Mission to the Solomon Islands, Operation Slipper and Operation Astute in East Timor. The unit has also contributed personnel to exercises in Papua New Guinea, Rifle Company Butterworth, and the Army Aboriginal Community Assistance Program. Based at Holsworthy Barracks, it was currently part of the 2nd Division's 5th Brigade, providing "construction engineering, hydro-graphic survey and Civil-Military Cooperation" capabilities. In 2011, the regiment had a posted strength of 240 personnel and it consisted of Regimental Headquarters, 101 and 102 Construction Squadrons, Littoral and Riverine Survey Squadron and CIMIC Squadron.

In mid-2013, it was announced that the regiment would be amalgamated with other Reserve engineer units and would cease to exist. During a parade on 23 November 2013 the regiment was disestablished with its squadrons being merged into other units: 101st Construction Squadron and the Littoral and Riverine Survey Squadron were added to 5th Engineer Regiment, 102nd Construction Squadron to the 8th Engineer Regiment, and the CIMIC Squadron was moved to become a direct asset of Headquarters 5th Brigade.

== Commanding officers ==
The following officers fulfilled the role of the regiment's commanding officer:

- Lieutenant Colonel D.A White (1950–51);
- Lieutenant Colonel E.F. Mullin (1953–57);
- Lieutenant Colonel W.A. Hay (1957–60);
- Lieutenant Colonel W.D. Duffy (1961–63);
- Lieutenant Colonel K.E. Hayward (1964-66.
- Lieutenant Colonel N.B. Lovett (1967–69);
- Lieutenant Colonel G.J. Allan (1970–72).
- Lieutenant Colonel R.B Allen (1973–75);
- Lieutenant Colonel A. Tinni (1976–80);
- Lieutenant Colonel R.B. Leece (1980–83);
- Lieutenant Colonel P.H.Shepherd (1984–86)
- Lieutenant Colonel N.R. Turner (1987–89);
- Lieutenant Colonel S.M. Wilson (1990–92);
- Lieutenant Colonel R.J. Woodburn (1993–95);
- Lieutenant Colonel C.D. Williams (1996–98);
- Lieutenant Colonel B. Boon (1999–2001).
- Lieutenant Colonel G.L. Fackender (2002-2004); and
- Lieutenant Colonel G.J. Nicholls (2005-2007)
