= 21st Construction Squadron (Australia) =

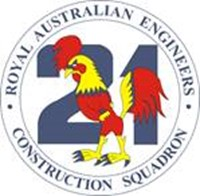
- Active: 1950 - present
- Country: Australia
- Branch: Australian Army
- Type: Squadron
- Role: Military Engineering
- Size: 150-275
- Part of: 6th Engineer Support Regiment
- Nickname: Ginger Beers
- Mottos: With Strength and Precision (6 ESR)
- Mascot: Red Rooster
- Anniversaries: 18th of June (Waterloo Dinner)
- Engagements: Vietnam; East Timor; Afghanistan; Iraq

Commanders
- Current Commander: MAJ Kieran Rooney
- 1st OC: MAJ R.A. Venn

21st Construction Squadron is a sub-unit of the Australian Army, primarily composed of personnel from the Royal Australian Engineers. Formed in 1950, the squadron is currently part of the 6th Engineer Support Regiment (6 ESR) and is based at RAAF Base Amberley. Throughout its history, both as an independent unit and as part of a regiment, the squadron has deployed personnel on numerous operations and exercises both domestically and abroad. Notable deployments include Vietnam, Borneo, East Timor, Iraq, and Afghanistan. Since 1998, the squadron has regularly participated in the Army Aboriginal Community Assistance Program (AACAP) and has frequently provided disaster relief to the wider Australian community and South West Pacific partners.

== History ==
=== Origins (1950–1962) ===
In June 1949, plans to establish a regular Construction Squadron in Victoria was in advanced stages. The Engineer-in-Chief's Technical Liaison Letter, published on 1 June 1949, announced approval for the formation of a regal regiment dedicated to construction tasks. 21 Construction Squadron was to be formed through the amalgamation of existing maintenance troops in Victoria. Final confirmation for the squadron's establishment came in December 1949, and on 25 January 1950, Major Ronald Arthur Venn was appointed as the Officer Commanding. He was tasked with organising and raising the unit from dispersed maintenance troops, marking 25 January 1950 as the official birth date of 21 Construction Squadron.

In December 1950, plans were finalised for accommodation and training facilities at Puckapunyal to support National Service. 21 Construction Squadron was assigned a key role in the construction of these facilities, making it practical to relocate the unit to Puckapunyal for the duration of the project. In March 1951, the squadron's headquarters and a troop based in Abbotsford were moved to Puckapunyal, with the squadron being stationed in its current area. After 1953, the troop from Bandiana also joined the squadron at Puckapunyal. At this time, the squadron was staffed by a core of wartime sappers, mainly from the 6th Division, and New Australian civilians, who made up approximately sixty percent of the unit's personnel. Puckapunyal became the permanent home of the squadron and apart from forays in TP&NG and Sabah, Malaysia, has provided the unit's firm base until its relocation to Gallipoli Barracks and subsequently RAAF Base Amberley.

The squadron has undertaken numerous construction projects for both the Army and civilian organisations across Victoria and other states of Australia. Many of the enhancements have contributed to the improvement of facilities, as well as the working and living conditions at various Army establishments. Some of these improvements include at:

- Army Apprentices School, Balcombe;
- Officer Cadet School, Portsea;
- Army Headquarters (AHQ) Survey Regiment, Bendigo;
- Seymour/Puckapunyal Area;
- Swan Island, Queenscliff;
- Lavarack Barracks, Townsville;
- Holsworthy Barracks;
- Shoalwater Bay Training Area.

Between 1954 and 1956, a major works program with expenditure in excess of 100,000 Australian Pounds was carried out in the Puckapunyal and Seymour Area. During this period, for materials alone, some of the costing amounts were:

- 1 Armoured Regiment Tank Wash - 1,000;
- Scrub Hill (Roads, accommodation, services) - 24,000;
- Puckapunyal outdoor pool - 49,000;
- Australian Services Canteen Organisation (ASCO) Canteen bulk issue point - 41,000;
- Improvements to Puckapunyal Water Supply - 30, 000;
- Bick Barracks to Mob Siding Seymour - 60,000.

In addition to the works in the Puckapunyal area, other specific projects completed by personnel from 21 Construction Squadron in the early years include:

- Ovals, Gymnasium and RAEME workshops;
- Army Apprentice School, Balcombe;
- Ovals at Watsonia;
- Fire Station, Athletics Track, Squash Courts and 1.7 Million gallon reservoir at Puckapunyal;
- 200 metre bridge at Swan Island, Queenscliff;
- Puckapunyal Airfield;
- Armoured Fighting Vehicle (AFV) Fording Pool at Puckapunyal;
- All Saints Chapel at Lavarack Barracks, Townsville;
- 25m range at Puckapunyal;
- Orchard Airfield at Holsworthy;
- Donovan Joynt Club at Puckapunyal;
- Classification Range at Kapooka;
- AFV Firing Range at Colston Hill, Puckapunyal.

=== Deployments abroad New Guinea, Malaysia and Vietnam (1962–1979) ===
In June 1962, the squadron was deployed to New Guinea for a twelve-month period, where it participated in various infrastructure projects aimed at both defence works and infrastructure development. This included road construction, airfield development at Passam, wharf construction at Wewak, expansions to the base camp at Moem, and the construction of brick married quarters for local government employees in Wewak. During the New Guinea deployment, a troop from 24 Construction Squadron was placed under the command of 21 Construction Squadron. This troop was stationed in Vanimo, where they completed a C130 airstrip to Department of Civil Aviation (DCA) specifications by early 1963. Following the completion of the airstrip, the troop was relocated to Passam. The squadron returned to Australia in July 1963.

From November 1965 to June 1966, 21 Construction Squadron was deployed to Sabah, Malaysia, relieving 24 Construction Squadron. The advance party arrived in early November, with the full changeover completed by 1 December 1965. Over the next six months, the squadron undertook various construction tasks, including camp expansions at North Pandean and continued road construction with forward elements positioned at several locations along the route. The squadron erected three Double Storey (DS) Bailey Bridges, each with a Military Load Classification (MLC) of class 30 and spans ranging from 80 to 90 feet. It also constructed three class 30 timber bridges, each approximately 40 feet in span. Additionally, the squadron installed 22 culverts, with an average length of 66 feet. Improvements to the Pandewas School included leveling a playground, constructing and installing playground equipment, and adding extra schoolroom facilities.

From 1965, 21 Construction Squadron deployed teams and personnel to support the Australian engineering contingent during the Vietnam War. The squadron personnel responsibilities centred around base camp design and maintenance to sustain military operations. Additional tasks encompassed resource extraction for construction, water purification and supply, electricity generation, surveying, bridging, rafting, and civil aid.

=== Force restructure (1980–1990) ===
In 1980, the reorganisation of 1 Division units and the establishment of the Logistic Support Group (LSG) to support the Operational Deployment Force (ODF) was announced. As a result of these changes, Headquarters 1 Construction Regiment was established to command 17, 21, and 22 Construction Squadrons. 21 Construction Squadron was designated as the "LSG Construction Squadron," with an additional role to provide construction support to the ODF and engineering services to 1 LSG. The squadron was placed on a 28-day notice to move in support of ODF operational deployments.

Despite the brief period available to achieve operational readiness from the reorganisation, 21 Construction Squadron successfully deployed as the LSG Construction Squadron for Exercise Kangaroo 81 from August to October 1981, completing all assigned tasks. Since then, the squadron has participated in numerous LSG "Steady Pack" and "Full Pack" exercises. It has also been deployed for extended periods to support other major defence exercises, including:

- Operation Normanby Ranger II, Shoalwater Bay 1981;
- Steady Pack 82, Puckapunyal 1982;
- Operation Normanby Ranger IV, Shoalwater Bay 1984;
- Full Pack 86 and Exercise K86, Gladstone 1986;
- Full Pack 88, El Alamein Camp, South Australia 1988;
- Exercise K89, Katherine Northern Territory 1989.

The unit has also deployed for 1st Construction Regiment exercises during this period, notably:

- Exercise Triple Shift, June to August 1986, Puckapunyal;
- Exercise Northern Shift, May to June 1988, Singleton.

During the 1980s, the squadron also completed Defence Cooperation Projects (DCP), major works tasks and provided Defence Force Aid to the Civil Community (DFACC) assistance in civil communities, including;

- Assistance to Ash Wednesday bushfires, February 1983;
- Assistance with flooding, Lae PNG, 1983;
- Construction of Donavan Joynt VC club, Puckapunyal, 1984;
- Support to AS/UK stack fragment trials, Woomera, 1985, 1988;
- DCP construction of mess facilities Tonga 1985;
- Assistance to bushfires at Bright, Jan 1983;
- Construction of squash courts, Broadmeadows 1986;
- Extensions to Gladstone Airfield, Gladstone 1986;
- Reconstruction of Route 20, Puckapunyal 1987;
- Construction of classification range, Kapooka 1987;
- Upgrade of Cultana airstrip, South Australia 1988;
- DCP Explosive Ordnance Disposal (EOD) support, Solomon's Islands 1988;
- Armoury construction and mess renovation, Butterworth 1988;
- DCP Electrical trade support, Vanuatu 1988, 1989.

In 1989, 21 Construction Squadron initiated an Adult Trade Training Program aimed at training serving sappers as Carpenters and Joiners (C&J) and Bricklayers (BL). Eight C&J apprentices and three BL apprentices began their studies at Bendigo TAFE in January 1989, achieving excellent results in their first year. In 1990, two additional BL apprentices were scheduled to start, and the C&J training was set to be transferred to the Army Apprentice School under a block release system. This program involves formal training at the Army Apprentice School combined with practical experience through works supervised by 21 Construction Squadron and civilian detachments. In their first year, these apprentices have made significant contributions by completing projects for various units at Puckapunyal and undertaking tasks interstate.

=== The 1990s and East Timor (1990–2003) ===
In the early 1990s, the squadron undertook its first overseas task of the decade in Western Samoa. This assignment involved constructing a police station and an early warning cyclone station. The squadron also completed its first local project, constructing an Armoured Fighting Vehicle range at Puckapunyal, and began an interstate project at Gallipoli Barracks, where it initiated the construction of various buildings for the South Queensland Logistic Group (SQLG). Additionally, Shoalwater Bay Training Area (SWBTA) saw significant road upgrades.

The year 1992 was marked by Exercise Kangaroo 92 in Katherine, Northern Territory, where the squadron consolidated many of its skills. That year also saw the beginning of the Kapooka Chapel construction, following excavation work completed the previous year. The chapel became a significant site for the Army, with nearly every soldier in the Australian Army having seen or visited it. The SQLG buildings were completed, and two northern projects were undertaken: the Light Horse Dive at Robinson Barracks, NT, and a scale camp at Mt. Bundy Training Area, NT.

In 1993, the squadron's move from central Victoria to Queensland was accomplished, with a stop at the Shire of Kilmore. The Western Ring Road at Mt. Bundy was constructed, and the squadron undertook its second overseas deployment in as many years, starting the construction of headquarters and accommodation buildings in tropical Vanuatu. The Kapooka Chapel was also completed.

By 1994, the accommodation and headquarters project in Vanuatu was completed. The squadron's second task of the year was constructing the 'Proof and Experiment' establishment at Port Wakefield, South Australia. At the home barracks, the squadron built changing rooms at Gymnasium No. 1 and refurbished the squadron's lecture room at the Red Rooster Inn.

In 1995, the squadron participated in Exercise Kangaroo 95 in Katherine, NT, focusing on sharpening its combat capabilities. The Proof and Experimental establishment at Port Wakefield was completed during this year.

In 1996, the squadron worked on the new Camp Growl at SWBTA and provided slab construction and road improvements.

In 1997, the squadron participated in Exercise Tandem Thrust along the Bruce Highway, with tasks including the construction of Turners Bridge, loading ramps at Camp Growl, and Samuel Hill airstrip. The year also saw the first Tonga detachment deployed to the South Pacific island, tasked with building a new headquarters facility at Taliai Camp for the Tongan Defence Force.

The year 1998 was dedicated to the AACAP. The main trade element constructed several houses at Marthakal on Elcho Island, NT, while the plant element built a sewerage system on Bickerton Island, NT.

In 1999, the squadron achieved notable successes, deploying on two overseas missions. The first was a return to Tonga to build a mess facility for Taliai Camp. Concurrently, the rest of the squadron participated in Exercise Croc 99 at SWBTA, which included constructing two bridges, roadwork, and clearing RAAF bombing sites. The Squadron also deployed with the multinational peacekeeping force INTERFET to East Timor, where it focused on road repairs during the wet season and supported other units.

=== 6th Engineer Support Regiment (2003–present) ===
In 2003, 21 Construction Squadron became part of 6 ESR. As a member of this formation, the squadron remained stationed at Gallipoli Barracks, Enoggera, where it contributed to the development of buildings and infrastructure adjacent to the Regiment Headquarters. In 2011, the squadron completed its relocation to Zabul Lines at RAAF Base Amberley, where it is currently based.

== Recent operations and projects ==
=== The Middle East (2001–2021) ===
21 Construction Squadron played a significant role in the Australian Defence Force's (ADF) efforts in Afghanistan, particularly during the Third Phase of operations when the focus shifted towards reconstruction and mentoring under Operation Slipper. The squadron was involved in various iterations of Reconstruction Taskforces, which were primarily tasked with conducting protected reconstruction operations in remote areas as part of a broader Dutch-led task force. These missions included developing health, education, and security infrastructure, such as constructing bridges at key river crossings in Uruzgan and neighbouring provinces. Additionally, several Squadron personnel were deployed to supplement Combat Engineer Regiment sappers with their technical expertise and construction skills. The squadron also contributed to Operation Highroad in Afghanistan, focusing on the train, advise and assist mission, and deployed personnel to Iraq under Operation Okra.

=== Army Aboriginal Community Assistance Program ===
The Army Aboriginal Community Assistance Program (AACAP), initiated in 1997, is a joint effort between the National Indigenous Australians Agency (NIAA) and the Australian Army. The program aims to enhance the environmental health and living conditions of Indigenous Australians and support the National Agreement on Closing the Gap. Also known as Exercise Saunders, this initiative is named in honour of CAPT Reg Saunders MBE who was the first Indigenous Australian commissioned in the Australian Regular Army. Each year, AACAP collaborates with a remote community to focus on construction (improving infrastructure and facilities), health (augmenting local services and access), training (empowering community members and enhancing employability), and community engagement (facilitating mutual learning and benefits). Additionally, AACAP supports Army objectives through deployment and force projection. The program has successfully delivered various projects, including housing and subdivisions, road upgrades, sewerage treatment plants, airfield construction, health clinics, telecommunications infrastructure, school improvements, and potable water supply systems. 21 Construction Squadron has, along with its sister squadron 17th Construction Squadron, been involved in many AACAPs over the years in various locations around Australia. Some examples are detailed below.

21 Construction Squadron AACAP Locations
| Year | Location | State | SQN | Remarks |
|---|---|---|---|---|
| 1998 | Docker River, Oak Valley, Bickerton Island, Elcho Island | NT, SA | 17 & 21 (Bickerton & Elcho Island) | Construction of a sewerage system in Bickerton Island by Plant Troop and several houses built in Marthakal on Elcho Island by Trade Troop. |
| 2000 | Melville Island, Bathurst Island | NT | 21 | |
| 2002 | Beagle Bay, Red Soil, Djarindjin, Bobieding, Banana Wells, Lobadina, Pandanus Park | WA | 21 | Construction of five homes with provision of power, water and sewerage to new homes and another two housing lots. |
| 2004 | Bamaga, Seisa, Injinoo, Umagico, New Mapoon | QLD | 21 | Construction of three houses, a 21 lot sub-division, further 2 houses at Umagico and a regional waste facility. |
| 2006 | Borroloola | NT | 21 | Construction of 4 houses with courses in welding, metal working, small-engine maintenance, computing and multi-media training. |
| 2008 | Kalumburu | WA | 21 | Upgrades to 16 km of unsealed road with installation of floodways, culverts and cement-stabilised sections. Additionally, finalisation of health clinic featuring three treatment rooms, baby baths, a secure pharmacy and accommodation for two staff. |
| 2010 | Pukatja | SA | 21 | Construction of three houses, 900m of road maintenance and integration of new and existing bores into water reticulation system. |
| 2013 | Fregon | SA | 21 | Construction of Fregon Children and Family Centre, softball pitch and the refurbishment of the Fregon Community Church, |
| 2015 | Titjikala | NT | 21 | Construction of duplex housing and a new waste water treatment system. |
| 2017 | Toomelah | NSW | 21 | Construction of new multi-purpose facility, a service road, refurbishing the church and sports oval change rooms. |
| 2019 | Jigalong | WA | 21 | Construction of all-weather creek crossings, a community barbeque area and a community youth centre. |
| 2021 | Pormpuraaw | QLD | 21 | Construction of "Men's Shed" to use for home projects and social gatherings as well as two 5-lot housing subdivisions. |
| 2025 | Torres Strait | QLD | 21 | TBC |

==== AACAP 2013 – South Australia ====
In 2013, the AACAP focused on the remote community of Fregon in South Australia's APY Lands. The program involved personnel from various Army units and international partners, including the East Timorese and Tongan Defence Forces. Key projects included the construction of the Fregon Children and Family Centre, providing vital services to the local community, and the refurbishment of the Fregon Community Church, which was in disrepair. The team also built a high-quality softball pitch, a point of pride for the APY Lands.

The dental team provided much-needed care to community members from nearby areas such as Mimili and Pukatja, while the environmental health team and medics engaged with local schools to teach hygiene, health, and first aid. The physical training instructors supported the Fregon Bulldogs AFL team and helped establish an exercise program at the local school.

The training team worked to upskill local men in trades such as concreting, welding, and small engine maintenance, while women received training in digital cameras and software. Over time, locals gained TAFE-recognised certifications, boosting their job prospects. Despite initial low attendance, the training efforts grew in success.

Life at Camp Birt, the base for the operation, was enhanced by strong camaraderie and activities, including sports and gym facilities. Despite challenges such as unseasonable rain and asbestos discoveries on key sites, AACAP 2013 was a resounding success, leaving a lasting positive impact on the Fregon community.

==== AACAP 2017 – New South Wales ====
In 2017, 21 Construction Squadron undertook Ex Saunders in Toomelah, NSW, located approximately 350 km from RAAF Amberley. The advance party arrived in April 2017, with the main elements joining in June and redeployment conducted in December 2017.

Key achievements during this deployment included significant construction projects such as building a 1,300 square meter Town Hall for the Local Aboriginal Land Council, upgrading local roads including Rooster Road, refurbishing the local church, and enhancing football oval facilities with new change rooms and lighting. Health initiatives were notable, with daily dental and medical care provided in Toomelah and Boggabilla, along with physiotherapy, sports injury treatment, and veterinary services for pets. The squadron also delivered a range of training programs, offering nationally recognised qualifications in construction, hospitality, business, engineering, and first aid.

Overall, the 2017 AACAP deployment in Toomelah greatly improved community infrastructure and health services, while also providing valuable skills training and experience for the squadron members.

==== AACAP 2019 – Western Australia ====
In 2019, 21 Construction Squadron was deployed to Jigalong, WA, located approximately 5,000 km from RAAF Base Amberley. The deployment, which lasted from May to September, included two rotations of 100 personnel each. The squadron's key achievements encompassed the construction of a community gathering space, an ablutions block, and two large culverts to enhance access and mitigate the effects of the wet season on creek crossings. The health team, consisting of various medical professionals, provided essential care and veterinary support, improving local health services and reducing the need for community members to travel for medical treatment.

Additionally, the squadron delivered accredited and non-accredited training in construction, guiding, and healthy lifestyles and supported local sports, including the Jigalong Eagles AFL team. The deployment demonstrated the squadron's logistical capabilities by road, with a ten-day journey each way. The construction efforts were divided between 6 ESR and a civilian contractor, with the contractors managing specific tasks. The operation left a positive legacy in the Jigalong community through enhanced infrastructure, health support, and community engagement, while reinforcing partnerships with 6 ESR and other capabilities.

==== AACAP 2021 – Far North Queensland ====
In 2021, 21 Construction Squadron undertook a three-month deployment to Pormpuraaw in Far North Queensland. The squadron's primary construction tasks included building a 20x12 metre Men's Shed for community projects and social gatherings, and developing two 5-lot housing subdivisions to support future growth. Additional projects encompassed the construction of a memorial cenotaph, the erection of a "Welcome to Pormpuraaw" sign, and various other infrastructure improvements.

The deployment also involved delivering health services, training in various trades, and providing professional development, which significantly enhanced the community's infrastructure and wellbeing. This experience was valuable for Squadron members, offering practical skills in trade development and community support in a remote setting.

==== AACAP 2025 - Torres Strait Islands ====
The upcoming AACAP for 2025 will occur, for the first time, in the Torres Strait Islands between PNG and mainland Australia. This particular AACAP will be renamed the "Army Ailan Community Assistance Program" to recognise the cultural differences between the mainland Aboriginal communities and the Torres Strait Islanders.

=== Humanitarian aid and disaster relief ===
21 Construction Squadron has a history of providing aid during civil disasters both domestically and internationally. Instances of support include flood relief in Wentworth and Euston (August 1956), assistance during the Viscount crash at Mangalore (October 1964), and aid for the Yea bushfire emergency (1966). The squadron was also involved in the Southern Aurora rail crash at Violet Town (1969), and again provided flood relief in Seymour and Nathalia (May 1974). Further assistance was given during the Orbost and Cann River bushfires (October 1980). Each year, the squadron maintained "Fire Standby Teams" to respond promptly to bushfires on the Puckapunyal Range and other civil emergencies.

In addition to its emergency response efforts, 21 Construction Squadron has supported charitable causes and community events. The squadron has been active in charity appeals such as Legacy and the Red Cross and has played a role in Anzac Day ceremonies across the region. On November 7, 1984, the squadron was honoured with the Freedom of Entry to the Shire of Kilmore in recognition of its dedicated service.

==== Operation Queensland Flood Assist 2011 ====
In early 2011, 21 Construction Squadron was deployed to assist with disaster recovery following the Queensland floods. Operating in Karalee and Grantham in the Lockyer Valley, the squadron provided essential support for community cleanup and recovery efforts. In Karalee, they used heavy equipment and manpower for cleanup operations. In Grantham, which had been severely impacted by an inland tsunami, the squadron's Plant/Transport Troop cleared debris, removed destroyed houses and handled large machinery. The Resources Troop helped clear yards and remove rubbish, while 1 Troop conducted door-knocking and search tasks. The squadron's contributions were recognised with a thank-you parade through Ipswich, acknowledging their significant role in the flood relief operations.

==== Operation Bushfire Assist and Operation Covid Assist – 2020 ====
In early 2020, 21 Construction Squadron rapidly deployed in support of Operation Bushfire Assist in response to the 2019-20 Australian bushfire season. Focusing on the Glen Innes Region and providing supplementation and relief across various elements of 6 Engineer Support Regiment (6 ESR) throughout the ADF. The squadron's impact was felt across New South Wales, the Australian Capital Territory, Victoria, and South Australia, as they carried out both vertical and horizontal construction tasks. The Resources Troop supported local residents on Kangaroo Island by providing essential water resources. Later in 2020, amid the COVID-19 pandemic, 21 Construction Squadron shifted its focus from international engagements to managing training and supporting the Australian community. This pivot was in response to the evolving situation, aligning with the broader efforts of the ADF and the wider community to address the impacts of the pandemic.

==== Operation Fiji Assist – 2020-2022 ====
In late 2020, following Cyclone Yasa's devastation in Fiji, 21 Construction Squadron deployed as the Deployable Immediate Response Team (DIRT) to assist the Fijian people. Activated in December, the squadron boarded HMAS Adelaide on Christmas Eve. During this deployment, they reconstructed Galoa Island Primary School and conducted water purification and distribution on Vanua Levu Island. Operation Fiji Assist was an opportunity for the squadron to support Pacific communities and test their contingency operations capabilities. Concurrent with ongoing support to Northern New South Wales in 2022, the squadron began deploying elements to Lekutu, Fiji, for Construction Engineering Team Phase 2, where they further completed the reconstruction of two school buildings damaged by Cyclone Yasa.

==== Operation Flood Assist 2022 ====
From March to April 2022, 21 Construction Squadron, supported by elements from 6 ESR, deployed to Lismore, NSW, as part of the Whole of Government Response to the February floods. The squadron's tasks included debris clearance, building damage assessments, restoration of critical infrastructure, and trade support. Squadron members collaborated with local and state government officials, as well as civilian contractors. Squadron members also conducted waterway surveys to assess damage and debris.

==== Operation Vanuatu Assist 2023 ====
In late February, the squadron was placed on notice to deploy to Vanuatu in response to the devastation caused by Cyclones Judy and Kevin. Quickly shifting from a training exercise, the squadron quickly adapted to what became a month-long disaster relief mission. While deployed, the squadron, in collaboration with the Vanuatu Mobile Force, restored 17 school classrooms and 5 medical facilities, distributed aid, and cleared debris from public roads and spaces. The squadron returned from the operation shortly before Easter.

== International engagement ==
21 Construction Squadron has consistently deployed personnel on various international engagements since its conception in 1950. This continues today where personnel are continually undertaking projects, operations and exercises, particularly in the South-West Pacific. In 2024 alone, the squadron deployed personnel on OP Lilia and OP Render Safe, has conducted construction projects in Papua New Guinea, Fiji, Vanuatu, Tonga, Kiribati and the Cook Islands as well as international exercises in Vietnam, Tonga, Papua New Guinea, Fiji and Timor Leste.

== Mascot ==
21 Construction Squadron features the "Red Rooster" as its mascot. The mascot first appeared at sporting functions, and members may recall dyed white leghorns gracing the Puckapunyal fields during premiership games. Sergeant Les Brown, who served as the football team's masseur, is frequently seen in photographs with the Red Rooster standard. In the early 1960s, the Rooster appeared on the unit flag, and the current flag design, incorporating the Red Rooster as the official emblem, has been approved by the MGO.

== Current organisation ==
Although the squadron has undergone various structural changes throughout its history, its main focus of providing construction capability to the wider Australian Army has not changed. Currently, the organisational structure includes a Squadron Headquarters (SHQ), a Squadron Works Office (SQN WKS), a Construction Troop (1 TP), a Plant Troop (PLT TP) and a Resources Troop (RES TP).

=== Squadron headquarters and Works Office ===
The squadron is commanded by a MAJ (04) in the position of Officer Commanding (OC). They are typically supported by a CAPT (03) as 2nd In Charge (2IC) and a WO2 (OR-8) in the position of Squadron Sergeant Major (SSM). The headquarters is typically assisted by several clerks and operations officers at various rank levels. The role of the SHQ is to command the construction effort in barracks and when deployed. The Works Office is commanded by a CAPT (03) in the position of Construction Officer (CONSTO) and is typically supported by several WO2s as Works Managers and other support staff. The Works Office plays a role in the planning and supervision of construction tasks. Its responsibilities encompass several key areas: reconnaissance and planning, which involves assessing the site and determining project requirements; project development and design, focusing on creating detailed plans and blueprints for construction; contracting and procurement, where it manages the selection and acquisition of necessary resources and services; and quality control (Level 3 QC), ensuring that all construction work meets established standards and specifications. Through these tasks, the Works Office ensures that construction projects are executed efficiently, meet all quality requirements, and align with the project's objectives.

=== Construction Troop ===
1 TP is typically led by a LT (02) or CAPT (03) in the role of Troop Commander and is supported by one or more SGTs (OR-6) as Troop Sergeants. The Construction Troop is tasked with a range of vertical construction duties essential to building development. Their responsibilities encompass the preparation of foundations through concreting to establish a stable base for structures. They are also involved in framing, which entails erecting the structural framework necessary for the building's integrity. The troop installs both internal and external cladding materials, which serve to protect and aesthetically enhance the building. In addition, they handle detailed finishing work including cabinetry installation, painting, and plastering to achieve a refined final appearance. The troop manages all aspects of plumbing, from potable water systems to grey and black water management. They also oversee electrical reticulation, ensuring the proper setup and distribution of internal and external electrical systems throughout the project.

=== Plant Troop ===
PLT TP is typically led by a LT (02) in the role of Troop Commander and is supported by one or more SGTs (OR-6) as Troop Sergeants. The Plant Troop specialises in horizontal construction and supports various construction operations with several crucial tasks. Their primary responsibilities include constructing and maintaining unsealed roads and airfields, which involves building and preserving these surfaces without paving. They also clear minor obstacles that could hinder construction and perform essential earthworks, including excavation and land-moving tasks needed for various projects. In addition to horizontal construction, the Plant Troop provides vital support to vertical construction efforts. This includes crane operations for lifting and placing heavy materials, service trenching for laying utility services, and site clearance/preparation to ready construction sites by removing debris and leveling the ground. They also handle building pad construction, creating stable & level areas for foundations. The troop's quarry and large earthworks duties involve winning and loading fill, extracting and transporting earth materials for construction, conducting large-scale excavation and land-shaping tasks, and clearing significant obstacles that may impact extensive construction projects.

=== Resources Troop ===
RES TP is typically led by a Lieutenant (02) in the role of Troop Commander and is supported by a SGT (OR-6) as the Troop Sergeant. The Resources Troop is pivotal in supporting various construction and operational tasks by providing essential resources and services. They extract and process water and rock, including rock crushing and blasting and source timber for construction projects. Their demolition work involves handling equipment and explosives for controlled demolitions. They also perform search and clearance operations to remove unexploded ordnance and other hazards. Additionally, the troop engages in minor civil and horizontal construction tasks, such as concreting, building culverts, and installing fences. They are responsible for establishing and maintaining operational camps, including Camp Birt, and conduct underwater operations for construction and maintenance through diving. They manage waste disposal from their activities and provide temporary bridging solutions to facilitate movement and logistics across obstacles.

== Commanders ==
=== Officer Commanding ===
| No. | Rank | Name | Period | Remarks |
| 1 | MAJ | R.A. Venn | 25 Jan 50 – 02 Jan 51 | 1st OC |
| 2 | MAJ | E. Dosseter | 02 Jan 41 – 15 Feb 53 | |
| 3 | MAJ | K. Proctor | 28 Jan 53 – 16 Jul 54 | |
| 4 | MAJ | G. Owens | 10 Sep 54 – 12 Aug 56 | |
| 5 | CAPT | E.A. Deveson | 27 Aug 56 – 21 Jan 60 | |
| 6 | MAJ | W.B. Lawson | 19 Jan 60 – 19 Feb 61 | |
| 7 | MAJ | P.C. Gration | 14 Feb 61 – 09 Aug 63 | |
| 8 | CAPT | L.H. Shaw | 22 Aug 63 – 03 Feb 64 | Admin Control |
| 9 | MAJ | E.A. McCloskey | 02 Dec 63 – 04 Nov 65 | |
| 10 | MAJ | J.N Stein | 21 Sep 65 – 31 Jul 68 | |
| 11 | MAJ | G.V. Brown | 02 Aug 68 – 10 Jun 69 | |
| 12 | MAJ | AJ. Fittock | 05 Jun 69 – Dec 71 | |
| 13 | MAJ | R.W. Fisher | Jan 72 – Aug 72 | |
| 14 | MAJ | D.R. Simmpkins | Jan 73 – Nov 73 | |
| 15 | MAJ | A.R. Black | Jan 74 – Mar 75 | |
| 16 | MAJ | A. J. Morton | Apr 75 – Jan 77 | |
| 17 | MAJ | J.S. Davey | Jan 77 – Dec 78 | |
| 18 | MAJ | R.H. Frisch | Dec 78 – Dec 80 | |
| 19 | MAJ | R. J. McKinnon | Dec 80 – Dec 82 | |
| 20 | MAJ | I.R. Grant | Dec 82 – Nov 84 | |
| 21 | MAJ | D.J. Martindale | Dec 84 – Dec 86 | |
| 22 | MAJ | A.G. Schmidt | Jan 87 – Dec 88 | |
| 23 | MAJ | W.A. Grice | Jan 89 – Dec 90 | |
| 24 | MAJ | P.J. Hutchinson | Jan 91 – Oct 92 | |
| 25 | MAJ | J.P. Young | Oct 92 – Dec 94 | |
| 26 | MAJ | W.E. Budd | Jan 95 – Dec 96 | |
| 27 | MAJ | D.J. Buckley | Dec 96 – Dec 98 | |
| 28 | MAJ | N.D. Greet | Jan 99 – Dec 00 | |
| 29 | MAJ | I.R Cumming | Jan 01 – Dec 01 | |
| 30 | MAJ | D.R.C. Ellis | Jan 02 – Dec 03 | |
| 31 | MAJ | S.J. Gliddon | Jan 04 – Dec 05 | |
| 32 | MAJ | G.A Halstead | Jan 06 – Dec 07 | |
| 33 | MAJ | L.P.H. Rouwhorst | Jan 08 – Jan 10 | |
| 34 | MAJ | T.P. Kuffer | Jan 10 – Jan 12 | |
| 35 | MAJ | J.C. Dugdell | Jan 12 – Jan 14 | |
| 36 | MAJ | C.G. Sampson | Jan 14 – Jan 16 | |
| 37 | MAJ | J.L. Venz | Jan 16 – Dec 17 | |
| 38 | MAJ | D. Palmer | Jan 18 – Dec 19 | |
| 39 | MAJ | G.J. Stannard | Jan 20 – Dec 21 | |
| 40 | MAJ | B.J. Kuchel | Jan 22 – Dec 23 | |
| 41 | MAJ | A.F Lupke | Jan 24 – Dec 25 | |
| 42 | MAJ | K.S Rooney | Jan 26 – present | Current OC |

=== Squadron Sergeant Major ===
| No. | Rank | Name | Period | Remarks |
| 1 | WO2 | W. M. Maguire | 01 Feb 50 – 27 Mar 53 | Acting SSM |
| 2 | WO2 | J.N. McMenanim | 24 Dec 53 – 29 Sep 55 | 1st SSM |
| 3 | T/WO2 | G.W. Atkinson | 14 May 56 – 13 Feb 57 | |
| 4 | WO2 | M.C. MacGartney | 20 Feb 57 – 19 Apr 59 | |
| 5 | WO1 | E.H. Graham | 13 Apr 59 – 24 Dec 59 | |
| 6 | WO2 | R. Bee | 25 Mar 60 – 13 Mar 61 | |
| 7 | WO1 | M. Deverson | 06 Mar 61 – 03 Sep 63 | |
| 8 | WO2 | H.B. Ravenscroft | 20 Sep 63 – 11 Aug 71 | |
| 9 | WO1 | C.A. Neumann | 07 Dec 71 – 16 Jan 75 | |
| 10 | WO1 | D.B. Bell | 27 Feb 75 – 14 May 76 | |
| 11 | WO1 | G.S. Biddlecombe | 19 May 76 – 31 Aug 77 | |
| 12 | WO1 | R.P. Janvrin | 27 Aug 77 – 14 Dec 79 | |
| 13 | WO1 | B.H. Nolan | 19 Sep 79 – 23 Jul 80 | |
| 14 | WO1 | J.P. Ryan | 30 Jul 80 – 13 Dec 83 | |
| 15 | WO1 | R.G. Thorbum | 14 Dec 83 – 31 Jul 85 | |
| 16 | WO1 | L.C. Shelley | 01 Aug85 – 13 Jun 87 | |
| 17 | WO1 | R. J. Raddatz | 14 Jan 87 – 03 Jan 89 | |
| 18 | WO1 | D.J. Hawkins | 03 Jan 89 – Dec 90 | |
| 19 | WO1 | K.J. Hughes | Dec 90 – Jan 93 | |
| 20 | WO1 | D.J. Trenberth | Jan 93 – Dec 94 | |
| 21 | WO1 | A.P. Smith | Dec 94 – Dec 97 | |
| 22 | WO1 | A.R. Andrews | May 98 – Dec 00 | |
| 23 | WO1 | B.L. White | Jan 01 – Dec 03 | |
| 24 | WO1 | R. Rae | Jan 04 – Dec 05 | |
| 25 | WO1 | D.A. Quirk | Jan 06 – Dec 07 | |
| 26 | WO1 | C.K. Barnett | Jan 08 – Jan 10 | |
| 27 | WO1 | R.R. Cotter | Jan 10 – Jan 12 | |
| 28 | WO1 | W.T. Hay | Jan 12 – Jan 13 | |
| 29 | WO2 | M.D Holzknecht | Jan 13 – Dec 14 | |
| 30 | WO2 | G.J. Haddy | Jan 15 – Dec 16 | |
| 31 | WO2 | D.A. Royle | Jan 17 – Dec 17 | |
| 32 | WO2 | K. Williams | Jan 18 – Dec 19 | |
| 33 | WO2 | A. Humphreys | Jan 20 – Dec 20 | |
| 34 | WO2 | D.K. George | Jan 21 – Dec 21 | |
| 35 | WO2 | M.A. Symmans | Jan 22 – Dec 23 | |
| 36 | WO2 | D.G. Power | Jan 24 – Dec 25 | |
| 37 | WO2 | A. Abraham | Jan 26 – present | Current SSM |

== See also ==
- Australian Defence Force
- Australian Army
- Royal Australian Engineers
- 6th Engineer Support Regiment
- 17th Construction Squadron
