= Malcolm van Gelder =

- Full name: Malcolm Montague van Gelder
- Born: 4 June 1933 Gunnedah, NSW, Australia
- Died: 16 August 2008 (aged 75) Canberra, ACT, Australia
- School: Warwick State High School
- Occupation: Army officer / Solicitor

Rugby union career
- Position: Breakaway / Hooker
International career
Years	Team	Apps	(Points)
1958	Australia		

Malcolm Montague van Gelder (4 June 1933 — 16 August 2008) was an Australian solicitor, Army officer and international rugby union player.

Born in Gunnedah, NSW, van Gelder attended Warwick High School in Queensland and afterwards came to Canberra to join the Royal Military College Duntroon, where he graduated as a Lieutenant in the Royal Australian Engineers. He was a breakaway on the Duntroon First XV, winning a Canberra Cup premiership with the team in 1955.

Van Gelder pursued further studies at the University of Adelaide. He played rugby for the university and was a South Australian interstate player at the 1957 Wallabies trials, before returning to Canberra in 1958. When he won selection for the Wallabies 1958 tour of New Zealand, records erroneously listed van Gelder as being picked from South Australia, though by then he was playing for Canberra club Easts.

During the 1958 New Zealand tour, van Gelder scored tries in both of his uncapped appearances, against Southland and Manawatu. He didn't feature against the All Blacks, with John Thornett and Chilla Wilson the preferred breakaways.

Van Gelder, newly promoted to captain, was posted to the Maralinga atomic test site for six months on his return home and then enrolled at the School of Military Engineering in Sydney, where he played his rugby with Parramatta.

Posted to Puckapunyal in 1959, van Gelder competed for the Army and Melbourne club Harlequins. He was a Victorian representative and played in a win over Queensland in 1961.

Van Gelder commanded the 17th Construction Squadron in Vietnam during 1968 and 1969. He had attained the rank of Lieutenant Colonel by the time he retired from the Regular Army in 1972. After gaining a law degree from the ANU in 1986, van Gelder was a solicitor for the remainder of his career.
