= AACAP =

AACAP may refer to:

- American Academy of Child and Adolescent Psychiatry
- Army Aboriginal Community Assistance Program, Australian federal program
