= Army Aboriginal Community Assistance Program =

Australian federal program

The Army Aboriginal Community Assistance Program (originally called a 'Project') is a program run by Department of Families, Housing, Community Services and Indigenous Affairs (FaHCSIA) and Australian Army to assist remote Indigenous Australian communities. It is also known as the ATSIC/Army Community Assistance Program and also Exercise SAUNDERS, after Reg Saunders, the first Indigenous Australian to be commissioned as an officer in the Australian Army.

It was announced by Senator John Herron on 14 November 1996. The first round of AACAP projects occurred between 1997 and 2000. The second round of projects were delivered between 2001 and 2004. The program continued in 2005 with projects funded in the 2004 Australian federal budget. The third round of projects were delivered between 2006 and 2009.

By the program's 10 year anniversary, over 100 houses had been constructed and more than $60 million spent on provision of infrastructure including "medical centres, airfields, roads, rubbish tips...[and] sewerage works". Various health services had also been delivered including "men's health programs, dental health screening and pet treatment programs".

Projects are managed through 19th Chief Engineer Works, and are delivered by a range of corps including the Royal Australian Engineers, the Royal Australian Electrical and Mechanical Engineers, Royal Australian Corps of Signals, Royal Australian Army Medical Corps, Royal Australian Army Dental Corps and the Royal Australian Army Educational Corps. The majority of these personnel are drawn from the 17th and 21st Construction Squadrons, and the 21st and 22nd Construction Regiments. Personnel from NORFORCE and the various Land Warfare Centre detachments are also sometimes involved. Each project consists of construction, health and training elements and are tailored to meet the needs of the community in which the project is undertaken.

Recent locations for AACAP have been Pukatja, South Australia (2010) and Fitzroy Crossing, Western Australia (2011). AACAP 2012 will be undertaken on the Dampier Peninsula.

== Locations ==
AACAP projects have been undertaken at the following locations:

Year	Location	Construction agency
AACAP 1997	Bulla, Northern Territory	17th Construction Squadron
AACAP 1998	Oak Valley, South Australia	17th Construction Squadron
	Elcho Island, Northern Territory	21st Construction Squadron
	Bickerton Island, Northern Territory	21st Construction Squadron
	Docker River, Northern Territory	17th Construction Squadron
AACAP 1999	Jumbun, Queensland	17th Construction Squadron
AACAP 2000	Melville and Bathurst Island, as part of the Tiwi Islands, Northern Territory	21st Construction Squadron
AACAP 2001	Yarralin/Lingara, Mialuni	17th Construction Squadron
	Amanbidji, Northern Territory	
AACAP 2002	Dampier Peninsula, Western Australia	21st Construction Squadron 19th Chief Engineer Works
AACAP 2003	Palm Island, Queensland	17th Construction Squadron 21st Construction Regiment 22nd Construction Regiment
AACAP 2004	North Peninsular Area (Cape York)	21st Construction Squadron
AACAP 2005	Fitzroy Crossing, Western Australia	17th Construction Squadron
AACAP 2006	Borroloola, Northern Territory	21st Construction Squadron
AACAP 2007	Doomadgee, Queensland	17th Construction Squadron
AACAP 2008	Kalumburu, Western Australia	21st Construction Squadron
AACAP 2009	Mapoon, Queensland	17th Construction Squadron
AACAP 2010	Pukatja, South Australia, a community located in the Anangu Pitjantjatjara Yankunytjatjara (APY) Lands	21st Construction Squadron
AACAP 2011	Fitzroy Crossing, Western Australia, and included the communities of Joy Springs and Bayulu, with works continuing in Joy Springs in 2012	
AACAP 2012	Dampier Peninsula, Western Australia, including the communities of Beagle Bay, Lombadina, Djarindjin and Ardyaloon	17th Construction Squadron
AACAP 2013	Fregon, South Australia, a community located in the Anangu Pitjantjatjara Yankunytjatjara (APY) Lands	21st Construction Squadron
AACAP 2014	Wutunugurra/Canteen Creek, Northern Territory	17th Construction Squadron
AACAP 2015	Titjikala, Northern Territory	21st Construction Squadron
AACAP 2016	Laura, Queensland	17th Construction Squadron
AACAP 2017	Toomelah, New South Wales	21st Construction Squadron
AACAP 2018	Yalata, South Australia	17th Construction Squadron
AACAP 2019	Jigalong, Western Australia	21st Construction Squadron
AACAP 2020	Aborted due to COVID-19	
AACAP 2021	Pormpuraaw, Queensland	17th Construction Squadron
AACAP 2022	Gapuwiyak and Baniyala, Northern Territory (NT)	17th Construction Squadron
AACAP 2023	Baniyala, Northern Territory (NT)	21st Construction Squadron
AACAP 2024	Amata, South Australia	17th Construction Squadron
AACAP 2025	Erub (Darnley) Island, Poruma (Coconut) Island and Warraber (Sue) Islet, Torres Strait Islands	21st Construction Squadron
