= 17th Construction Squadron =

- Active: 1949–1973; 1977–present
- Country: Australia
- Branch: Australian Army
- Type: Squadron
- Role: Military engineering
- Size: 150–275 personnel
- Part of: 1st Australian Task Force (1966–1971); 1st Construction Regiment (1977–1990); Independent Squadron (1990–2003); 6th Engineer Support Regiment (2003–present)
- Nickname: Ginger Beers
- Motto: A little bear will fix it
- Mascot: A Little Bear
- Anniversaries: 18 June (Waterloo Dinner)
- Engagements: Vietnam War; Namibia; East Timor
- Honour Distinctions: Namibia 1989–1990

Commanders
- Notable commanders: John Sanderson

The 17th Construction Squadron is an Australian Army sub-unit consisting of personnel drawn mainly from the Royal Australian Engineers. Originally formed in 1949, the squadron is currently part of the 6th Engineer Support Regiment and is based at RAAF Base Amberley. Personnel from the squadron have deployed on operations during the Vietnam War, in Namibia, East Timor, the War in Afghanistan and Iraq. The squadron has participated in the Army Aboriginal Community Assistance Program since 1997, and has also been called upon to provide assistance to the wider Australian community following natural disasters, including most recently in the wake of the 2010–11 Queensland floods.

== History ==
=== Squadron origins (1949–1965) ===
17th Construction Squadron was raised out of the Eastern Command Maintenance Squadron on 20 September 1949 as a Regular unit, under the command of Captain E. Phillips. Upon formation it consisted of three troops: 8, 9 and 10. Squadron headquarters was located at Kingsford, New South Wales, along with the 9 and 10 Troops, while 8 Troop was located in the Moore Park area. The year later, Plant Troop was raised and moved to Woomera, South Australia. It had initially been planned that the squadron would form part of a regimental formation known as the 4th Construction Regiment, but the regiment was never raised and the squadron was formed as an independent unit.

During the period between 1950 and 1965 the squadron carried out considerable construction and relief tasks both within Australia and overseas. It was involved in the construction of the Woomera Rocket Range from 1950 to 1954. In 1953 it was also involved in the site construction for project "Two Zero Zero", an atomic weapons test site. Between January and October 1953, the squadron worked to prepare the site ahead of the detonation of the first atomic weapon exploded on the Australian mainland, which took place in October 1953 under the guise of Operation Totem. In 1956, work was undertaken at Moorebank where the squadron constructed a pontoon harbour and also at Randwick where work on new soldiers' accommodation was completed.

In 1960, an element from 8 Troop was deployed to New Hebrides to help restore Port Vila after it was struck by a cyclone. The following year, 10 Troop was detached to the command of the 24th Construction Squadron and deployed to Vanimo and Passam, Papua New Guinea, where they completed road building tasks and constructed a 300-ton wharf. In June 1963, the main body of the squadron deployed to Wewak, taking over from the 21st Construction Squadron, before returning to Australia in June 1964, having been replaced by the 22nd Construction Squadron.

=== South Vietnam (1966–1971) ===
The most significant part of squadron history was its involvement in the Vietnam War. The squadron was in South Vietnam from 1966 to 1971 and was involved in a wide variety of engineering tasks. The first to deploy was 8 Troop, which was initially based around Vung Tau, although they were later deployed to the 1st Australian Task Force base at Nui Dat in August 1966. At Nui Dat, elements of the squadron took part in the defence of the base during an attack the day before the Battle of Long Tan; amidst heavy indirect fire, three members of the squadron were wounded. 10 Troop relieved 8 Troop at Nui Dat in October, and in February 1967 the squadron's third troop, 9 Troop, was deployed to Vietnam. Early tasks undertaken by the squadron included clearing operations in support of the 5th Battalion, Royal Australian Regiment during Operation Leeton, and sustainment operations. The construction of helipads and land marking operations were common tasks carried out by Plant Troop. In 1967 the squadron completed a 300,000 gallon dam. This provided the Australian contingent with an alternate water supply. At Nui Dat the squadron set up a large quarrying operation in early 1968.

The squadron was also involved in the construction of the 1st Australian Logistics Support Group (1 ALSG) base amid the sand dunes at Vung Tau following its occupation in May 1966. Although a detachment of engineers from 1 RAR Group had commenced basic works to prepare the area prior to the lodgement, including a basic water supply and road construction, much work remained. Lacking basic facilities for logistic operations including unloading facilities, roads and hardstanding, 1 ALSG struggled to become operational and commence logistic support to 1 ATF forward at Nui Dat. Meanwhile, basic hygiene and stifling heat were also a significant problem. Urgent work was required and the development plan included cutting and spreading the sand dunes, reclaiming large areas of swamp land, road construction, establishing accommodation, hardstanding, storage areas, workshops and vehicles parks, as well as extensive drainage works. Other tasks included winning construction resources, water purification and supply, electricity generation, survey, bridging and rafting, and civil aid. Helipads were also constructed to enable 1 ALSG to be resupplied by helicopter and for 2 Field Ambulance to receive casualties. Later, in April 1968 a quarry was also constructed at Vung Tau to supply crushed rock, gravel and fine sand for the pavement of roads, airfields, helipads and development of hardstanding.

Land clearing operations had been undertaken by 1st Field Squadron since the occupation of Nui Dat to improve base defences and observation. Later they were extended for tactical purposes to open up key routes within Phuoc Tuy by removing vegetation to deny cover and concealment to the Viet Cong, and also provided arable land for villagers as part of the Pacification program. In March 1968, a dedicated Land Clearing Team was formed by 17th Construction Squadron elements at Nui Dat to supplement existing arrangements. One particular operation, codenamed "Cooktown Orchid" conducted in April 1968, saw a large element of Plant Troop deploy under infantry and armoured protection to clear undergrowth and trees in the foothills of the Long Hải Hills. Land clearance operations proved quite dangerous for the plant operators who were exposed to land mines and booby traps, as well as to attack by small arms and other direct fire weapons. During this operation one D8 bulldozer was destroyed, and a sapper injured when an RPG round hit the dozer he was operating. In 1969 the squadron continued with land clearing tasks within the 1 ATF area of operations. During the operation, numerous bunker systems were uncovered and the D8 dozers detonated many mines. In August 1969, 9 Troop assisted in replacing a sabotaged bridge with a 206-foot (63 m) floating pontoon bridge. The enemy had blown the bridge on National Route 51, 40 miles (64 km) south-east of Saigon. The troop, working with the US Engineers, took only 13 hours to re-open the road.

1970 saw the squadron heavily committed to Project 399, the civil aid program involving the construction of housing for Regional Force soldiers and their families throughout Phuoc Tuy province. The squadron built a total of 410 houses at sites such as Baria, An Nhuit, Dat Do, Ong Trinh and Duc Thanh. On 20 September the unit celebrated its 21st birthday. Later that year, John Sanderson was appointed Officer Commanding. It was at about this time that the unit adopted the "Little Bear" symbol and the motto, "A Little Bear will Fix It", which is well known on Norton's Bear Brand Tape. The little bear was created in the mid-1950s by Sydney cartoonist Syd Miller and has been in extensively since that time. Quarrying operations during 1970, with the squadron operating Hadfield and Aveling-Barford crushers at three sites. Throughout 1971 a number of major road projects were completed, as was a 36-metre-long (118 ft) bridge over the Song Rai River. The squadron subsequently returned to Australia, where it moved to Enoggera, Queensland. At the height of its involvement in Vietnam, the squadron consisted of 12 officers and 334 other ranks.

=== Enoggera and disbandment (1972–1973) ===
The decade of the 1970s saw the demise of the squadron as the RAE was reorganised around a regimental structure. In February 1972, it was renamed the 17th Field Squadron, as part of 2nd Field Engineer Regiment, based at Enoggera. While part of the regiment, the squadron completed construction works in Tully as part of the regiment's involvement supporting the Medium Tank Trials Unit. Public relations projects were also undertaken including work on Tully hospital, schools, golf and bowling clubs. In mid-1973, 17th Field Squadron merged with 7th Field Squadron, and the unit's designation fell off the Royal Australian Engineers Order of Battle. The unit remained disbanded until 1977.

=== Re-raised in Sydney (1977–1989) ===
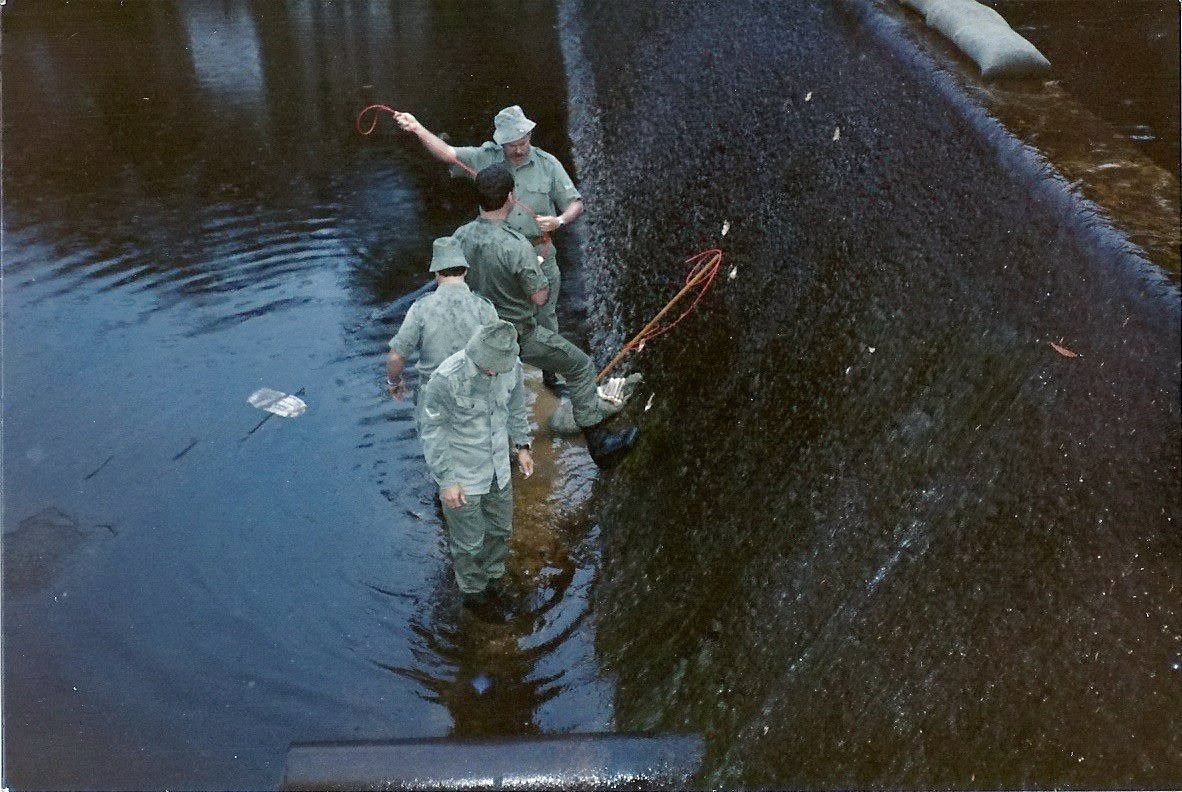
Placing bore-hole demolition charges

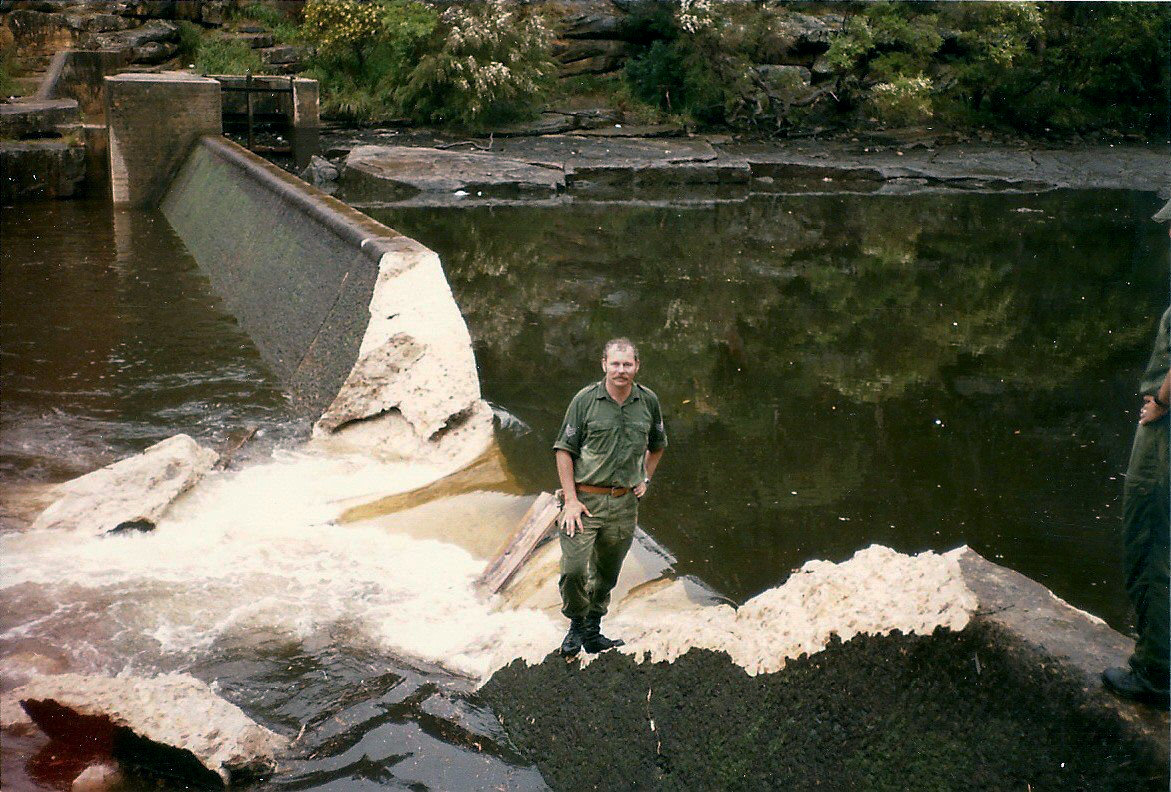
Sergeant Phil Palazzi after the demolition

Sappers from 8 Troop performing a controlled demolition of the Weir on the Woronora River at Engadine, New South Wales in 1982.

In August 1977, the 17th Construction Squadron was re-raised at Gallipoli Lines, Holsworthy Barracks, as part of the 1st Construction Regiment. Upon establishment, the unit was placed under the command of Major John Koek. The squadron's first task saw it sent to Nowra, where it was tasked with constructing fuel storage tanks for the Royal Australian Navy. In addition to this, the squadron worked to restore the accommodation buildings that it had been assigned. Having established itself, during the first six months of 1978 the squadron completed a number of small construction tasks for surrounding units in the Holsworthy area, including new facilities for the 1st Field Engineer Regiment. An annual camp was also held at Gosper, New South Wales. In 1979, the 17th Construction Squadron was placed on stand-by for service in Namibia.

During the early 1980s operational readiness planning took up a large slice of the squadron's effort. During this decade a large number of construction tasks were still completed, including the construction of the Holsworthy Range Road, the School of Military Engineering Museum upgrade and numerous Lysaght buildings. A detachment also supported 22nd Construction Squadron with the construction of facilities for the Special Air Service Regiment.

In 1982 8 Troop performed a small controlled demolition of the Woronora Weir at Engadine. When Severe Tropical Cyclone Isaac hit Tonga on 3 March 1982, killing 6 people and making 45,000 homeless, the entire squadron was deployed to Tonga for a two-week period to assist with urgent shelter and recovery efforts.

In 1985 the Squadron rebuilt the airfield at the army's Shoalwater Bay Training Area.

In 1987–88 over a six-month period the Plant Troop constructed a large earth filled dam on the upper Nepean River at the Bents Basin State Recreation Area.

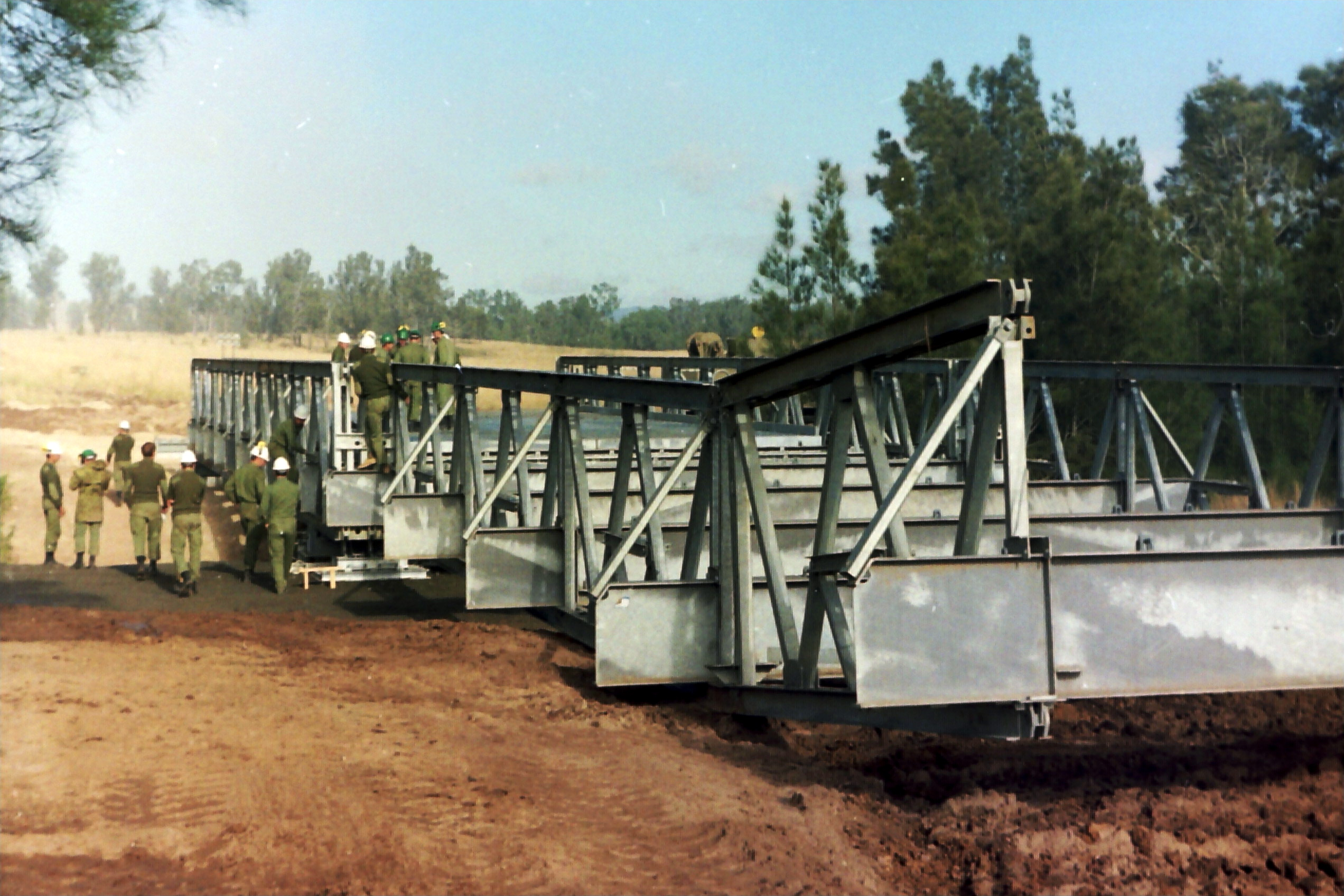
Constructing a Transfield heavy girder bridge

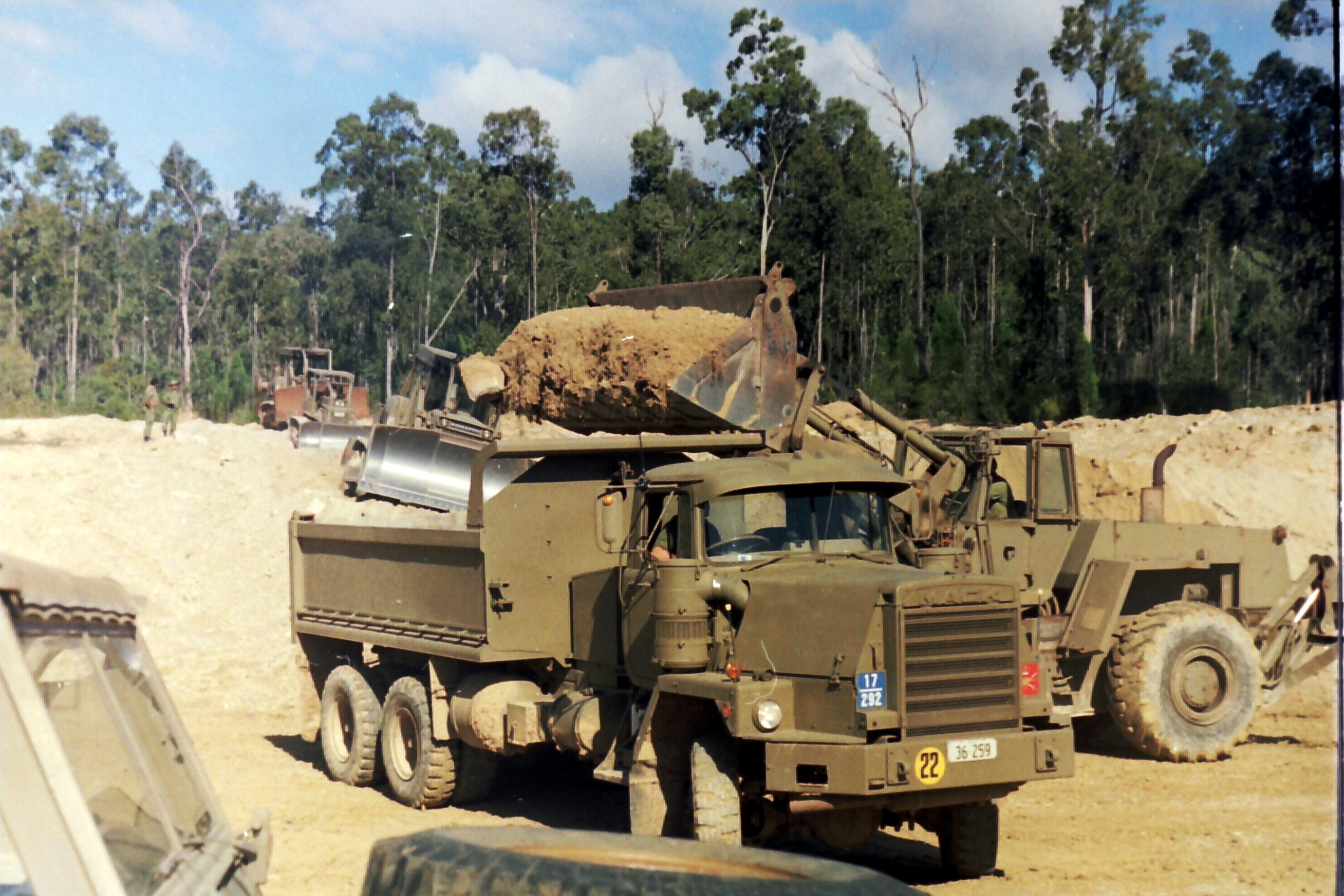
Plant Troop on exercise winning road-base.

Engineers from the 17th Construction Squadron on exercise with the 1st Construction Regiment at Singleton, New South Wales in 1988.

The squadron participated in a major exercise with the 1st Construction Regiment at Singleton, New South Wales in 1988. This was the first occasion that the Transfield heavy girder bridge had been constructed on exercise. Also in 1988 9 Troop constructed the Holsworthy Range Control facility and facilities at Penrith.

Other works were undertaken overseas by detachments as part of the Defence Co-operation Program. Established in the early 1960s to engage with Southeast Asian nations, in the early 1980s the program was refocused upon the nations in the Southwest Pacific, where a number of construction projects were implemented. During this time, projects were completed in several countries including:

- Tonga: Construction of facilities for the Tonga Defence Services;
- Vanuatu: To assist Vanuatu in maintaining and operating its Pacific class patrol boat, donated by Australia in 1987, the squadron deployed a composite troop of 30 personnel for four months in 1988 to construct a Patrol Boat Base and support facilities in Port Vila; and
- Papua New Guinea where facilities were constructed for the Papua New Guinea Defence Force.

In early 1988, the squadron deployed an officer to Wilkes Station, Antarctica to develop an environmental clean-up plan to remove, make safe or dispose of a large accumulation of rubbish, fuel in drums, explosives, chemicals and gas cylinders deposited since the late 1950s. The plan was subsequently carried out over a period of years for the Australian National Antarctic Research Expeditions by a series of detachments from the squadron.

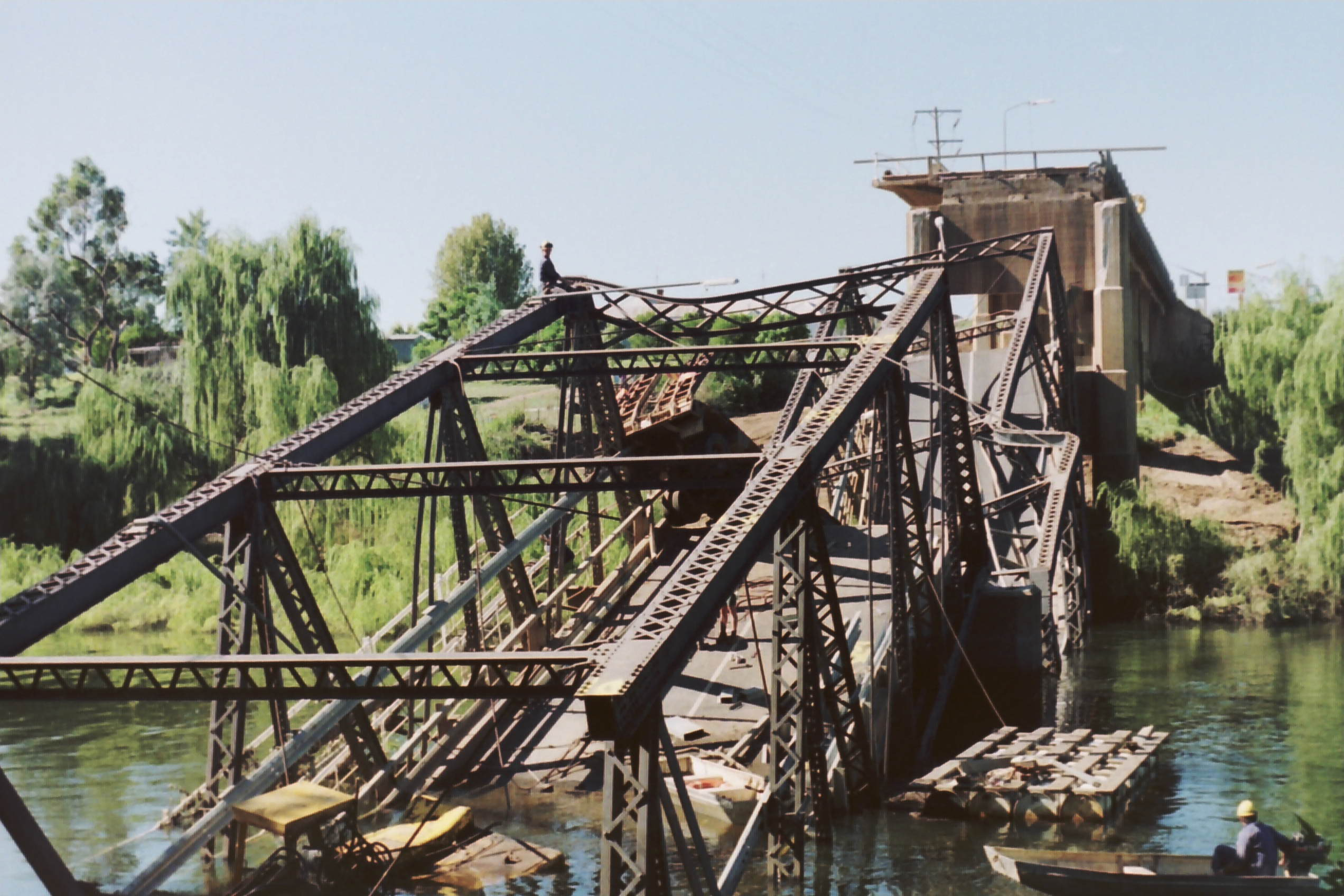
Highway bridge destroyed by a truck.

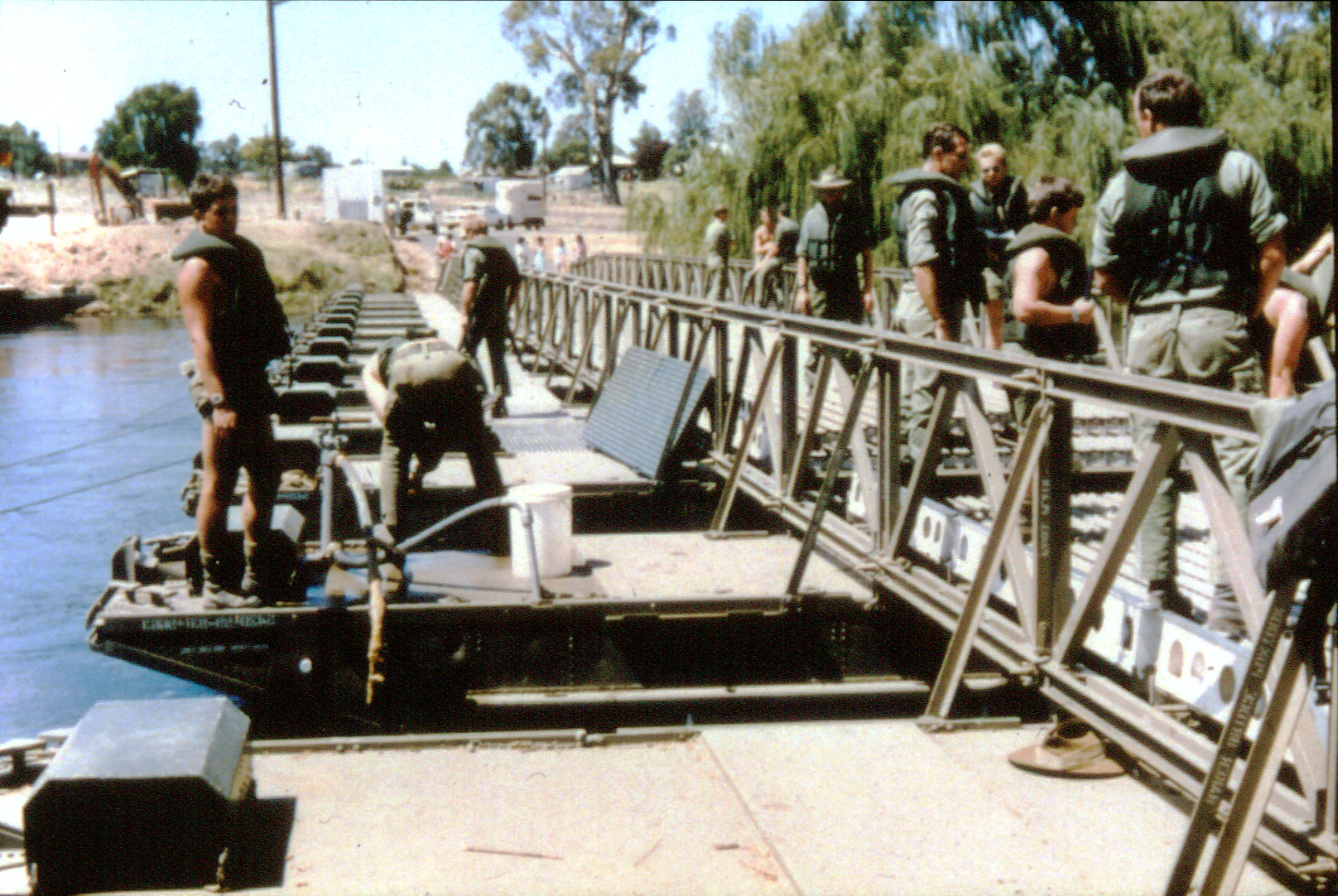
Light Assault Floating Bridge (LAFB).

9 Troop constructed a pontoon bridge across the Macquarie River on the Mitchell Highway at Wellington, New South Wales in January 1989.

Just prior to deployment to Namibia in January 1989, 9 Troop was deployed at short notice to construct a Light Assault Floating Bridge (Pontoon bridge) across the Macquarie River on the Mitchell Highway in Wellington, New South Wales which had been destroyed by a truck carrying an excavator.

=== Namibia (1989–1990) ===
Having been on stand-by since 1979, the squadron finally deployed to Namibia in April 1989 as part of the Military Component of the United Nations Transition Assistance Group UNTAG. An augmented squadron of 275 personnel was deployed which included a Field Engineer troop from 7th Field Squadron. There were two rotations during the deployment, each of six months duration. The second rotation included a troop from the Corps of Royal New Zealand Engineers.

During the first rotation, the squadron was involved in a wide variety of tasks. The first task was to lead "Operation Safe Passage". This required the squadron members (supported by British signallers) to work as infantry and man border and internal assembly points. At the time these were the only military units that could be re-deployed quickly to northern Namibia. The aim of the operation was to facilitate the withdrawal of the South-West Africa People's Organisation's (SWAPO) military wing, the People's Liberation Army of Namibia (PLAN) combatants. A total of nine assembly points were established with 10 soldiers and five military observers at each. Agreement was subsequently reached in late April that the SADF personnel be restricted to their bases from 26 April; and in effect from this date hostilities largely ceased. Over this period of about three weeks it has been estimated that 251 PLAN combatants were killed for the loss of 21 members of the SADF and other Security Forces. The fact that the Australian soldiers survived this operation without casualty was said to be a tribute to the 'training standards of the Australian Army and perhaps, a bit of good luck'.

The next major task was to construct and support a number of Returnee Reception centres for the United Nations High Commission for Refugees. The squadron constructed two of the major entry points (at Ongwediva and Engela in Ovamboland), the construction of others was managed by the works office. They were administered under the auspices of the Repatriation, Resettlement and Reconstruction Committee of the Council of Churches in Namibia (CCN).

The Squadron was also occupied with route and mine clearance. The SADF laid recognised, marked and fenced, anti-personnel minefields typically as perimeter protection to bases and vital assets. The SADF reported laying 45,000 mines during the conflict of which 3,000 were unaccounted for when UNTAG arrived. SWAPO employed mines as a means of ambushing or intimidation. Much of the work of the 75 Field Engineers deployed with each contingent was area search, clearance of exposed mines, marking minefields and route clearance. Colonel John Crocker, the Commander of the 2nd Contingent wrote that "For the first time since the Vietnam War, Australian Sappers hand cleared their way into live minefields on seven separate occasions to destroy exposed mines. Similar mines killed several civilians and many animals during the mission. Field engineers of the contingent destroyed over 5,000 items of unexploded ordnance (UXO) ranging from artillery shells, through RPG rockets to grenades. UXO, a legacy of the 20-year Bush War, posed a major hazard to local inhabitants in the northern provinces and to UNTAG personnel in that area".

The second rotation provided considerable support to the elections that were conducted in November 1989 and which was the primary task for the remainder of the deployment. Activities commenced with 1 ASC from May 1989 onward, but became the primary task for 2 ASC. Major tasks included:

- Service support: Support was provided to approximately 500 electoral centres and police stations through the siting and erection of either permanent or portable accommodation as well as the provision of essential services;
- Construction engineering: including the construction, modification or upgrade of UNTAG working and living accommodation, the provision of essential services (power, water and air traffic control facilities) and the maintenance and upgrade of roads and Opuwo airfield.
- Ready Reaction Force: On two separate occasions during the November 1989 election, the ASC's Ready Reaction Force was used to disperse rioters who were offering violence to UN election motors, including Australians.

The squadron also conducted other works tasks which included an upgrade of the Rundu air base (construction of a movement facility and helipads), construction of a school building for one of the local schools, and the upgrade and maintenance of roads and hard-stands in the area. The second rotation returned to Australia in February 1990. The squadron for their efforts in Namibia received many letters of commendation and appreciation including in 2012 the award of the first Honour Distinction. This is a new (2012) award that provides recognition for outstanding service in operations in other than declared theatres of war.

=== RAAF Scherger (1990–1996) ===
During the 1990s, the squadron was moved outside of the regimental structure, becoming independent once again. In March 1993, it became involved in the construction of RAAF Base Scherger, near Weipa in Far North Queensland. The biggest project undertaken by the Royal Australian Engineers at the time, the task drew very heavily on the squadron's personnel and resources, with three rotations each year. The squadron's involvement with the project was complete by the end of 1996, although ongoing refurbishment continued throughout 1997. The base was officially opened on 5 August 1998 by the Prime Minister, John Howard.

== Recent operations and projects ==
=== AACAP (1997–present) ===
In 1996, Prime Minister John Howard committed Australian Army resources to improve health related infrastructure in remote Aboriginal communities. Assisting units provide logistic, transport, communication and health support to the soldiers. The Army Aboriginal Community Assistance Program (AACAP) was initiated in 1997 by the 17th Construction Squadron in the Bulla community, in the vicinity of Timber Creek in the Northern Territory. The squadron has been responsible for AACAPs at a number of locations.

=== INTERFET (1999–2000) ===
At the completion of AACAP Jumbun in 1999 the squadron was deployed at short notice to participate in Operation Warden as part of the International Force for East Timor (INTERFET). Some of the key Squadron activities in East Timor included the construction of the Dili sewage ponds, the extension and resurfacing of the Suai airstrip, drainage works in Dili, the Dili heliport, force water points and support to other units. The squadron was on operations for approximately five months.

=== 6th Engineer Support Regiment (2003–present) ===
In 2003, the 17th Construction Squadron became a part of the 6th Engineer Support Regiment. As a part of this formation, the squadron has remained at Holsworthy, even though the rest of the regiment is split between at Gallipoli Barracks, Enoggera, and Zabul Lines, RAAF Base Amberley. In 2011, the squadron deployed personnel as part of Exercise Pacific Partnership, which saw personnel deployed on board the USS Cleveland from where they were dispatched to Vanuatu, Tonga, Papua New Guinea, East Timor and Micronesia to complete various construction works. The unit was also heavily involved in supporting the Australian Army's commitment to Operation Queensland Flood Assist. It has also contributed personnel to ongoing operations in Afghanistan as part of Operation Slipper, and to Timor Leste as part of Operation Astute. Most recently, the Squadron has deployed members to Iraq in order to support Operation Okra, and Afghanistan in Operation Highroad as part of a train, advise and assist mission. As of 2016, the squadron has relocated to RAAF base Amberley to join the remainder of 6ESR.

== Awards and commendations ==
The Squadron was awarded a Chief of the General Staff Commendation from Lieutenant General Lawrence O'Donnell in March 1990 for the deployment to Namibia.

In April 2012 the Chief of Army, Lieutenant General David Morrison, approved a recommendation for the award of the first Honour Distinction to 17th Construction Squadron. This is a new (2012) award that provides recognition for outstanding service in operations in other than declared theatres of war. The citation for the award reads:

17 Construction Squadron is awarded the Honour Distinction, Namibia 1989–1990, in recognition of its creditable performance in support of the United Nations Transition Assistance Group operation to manage the transition of Namibia to independence in 1990. Despite being deployed to provide engineering support, when the ceasefire broke down at the start of the mission, members of the squadron helped establish Assembly Points, which enabled the mission to continue. This activity was conducted in the face of hostility from elements of the former colonial power and personal danger arising from the breakdown of the cease fire. Later, 17 Construction Squadron became involved in the election process itself, providing security, transport and logistic support to election officials, monitors, other UN personnel, voters and polling stations. Members of 17 Construction Squadron ensured that, as much as possible, the election was able to proceed without interruption or interference and ensured that all parties were free from intimidation or duress. With the selfless support of individuals from other units of the Australian Defence Force, 17 Construction Squadron played a key role in the smooth and effective transition of Namibia from colonial rule to independence. The Squadron performed a role well beyond what was expected and brought great credit on itself, the Australian Army and Australia.

— Letter from the Chief of Army to the Governor General, Canberra: Army Headquarters, 10 April 2012

The award was presented to the unit on 11 May 2013 by the Governor-General, Quentin Bryce.

== Commanders ==
The following officers have served as the squadron's Officer Commanding (OC):

- E. Phillips (1949);
- Malcolm van Gelder (1968–69);
- J. Wertheimer (1969–70);
- K Park (1970)
- John Sanderson (1970–71);
- J. F. Koek (1977–78);
- R. Weber (1983–85);
- David Crago (1988–89);
- B. Sowry (1989–90);
- Ahmad Mostafa (1991–92);
- Stephen Day (1993–94);
- Shane Miller (1997–98);
- Mark Shephard (1999–2000);
- N. Beutel (2001–02);
- Paul Hobbs (2003–04);
- J. Miezio (2005–06);
- J. Taylor (2012–14);
- J. B. K. Plimmer (2015–1?);
- A. Buenen (2019–).
