= Military aid to the civil community =

Type of military operation

Military aid to the civil community (MACC) is a phrase referring to the armed forces providing a service to the civilian community. It is used in many countries, particularly the United Kingdom.

== Australia ==
The Australian Defence Force uses the term "defence assistance to the civil community" (DACC) which is divided into a range of categories.

- DACC category 1: Assistance in local emergency situations when immediate action is necessary to save life. This can be arranged at the local level between civilian emergency services and local ADF commanders.
- DACC category 2: Emergency assistance in more extensive or continuing disaster when state or territory resources are inadequate. This may include search and rescue, transport and evacuation, and communications. Requests for such assistance are normally made by state or territory governments to the federal government. Examples of this included large scale assistance after the 1955 Hunter Valley floods, Cyclone Tracy, 1989 Newcastle earthquake, Black Saturday bushfires and the 2011 Queensland floods.
- DACC category 3: Assistance in recovery from an emergency or disaster which is not directly related to the saving of life or property. Requests for such assistance are normally made by civilian emergency services through Emergency Management Australia. This includes, for example, providing temporary bridges where permanent bridges have been destroyed by fire or flooding.
- DACC category 4: Non-emergency assistance for public relations and ceremonial purposes. This includes requests for ADF equipment for use in film and television productions, flypasts for public events and performances by military bands. Requests for such assistance are normally made by the organiser through Department of Defence public affairs.
- DACC category 5: Non-emergency assistance of a minor nature. This includes training for emergencies and disasters and other forms of training, except training with law enforcement.
- DACC category 6: Support to civil authorities in the performance of non-emergency law enforcement where there is no possibility of the ADF using force.

== Canada ==
Canadian legislation and practice is very similar to that of the UK, adjusted to reflect the constitutional authority and responsibility of provinces. Provinces are responsible for dealing with most situations requiring emergency military assistance. The military is frequently called out by provinces to deal with forest fires, floods, and ice storms and even lost children.

Unlike military aid to the civil power, the procedures are much less formal and decision-making is decentralized. Since the military does not act in a police role when called out under these provisions, the main issue is the level of government that pays for this aid; in principle, when a province requests aid, it must pay the bill.

The military also provides certain full-time functions, including search and rescue at sea and for missing aircraft. It also provides patrols in the air and at sea to enforce civil regulations in regard to pollution, fishing, etc. However, this assistance is in support of other federal government departments and is the subject of simple inter-department memoranda of understanding.

== Germany ==
MACC is one of the fundamental military tasks of the Bundeswehr. It was also historically very important to get legitimation and the support of the population, since German rearmament was a difficult political decision, taken under heavy criticism. The Grundgesetz (the German constitution) contains several rules regarding MACC. The use of force is not permitted by the Bundeswehr under normal conditions. If force is required, the Bundesgrenzschutz federal police can be requested by the Bundesland.

Until the MACC during the North Sea flood of 1962 the constitution banned the use of the Bundeswehr in Germany totally. Due to public acceptance problems in the early Bundesrepublik, the Bundeswehr focused on MACC to improve its public image. During the North German Winter Catastrophe of 1978 and in several other incidents, the Bundeswehr provided substantial aid to the population. The Bundeswehr, with its SAR helicopters, is also part of the German air rescue system. The Luftwaffe also evacuates German citizens in international crises and catastrophes on behalf of the Auswärtiges Amt (the Ministry of Foreign Affairs). The Luftwaffe also offers a flying hospital for medical withdrawal, which evacuated terror victims from Tunisia and tsunami victims from Thailand.

== Ireland ==
In Ireland, the defence forces may provide assistance to civil communities through aid to the civil power (ATCP) arrangements with the government of Ireland. The Irish Army, Naval Service and Air Corps may be called upon during times of natural emergencies, such as storms, floodings, large fires, etc. This is in addition to its ATCP and aid to government departments roles, which include national security, counter-intelligence, counter-terrorism, prisoner, cash, ammunition and explosives transport, maritime safety, search and rescue, drug interdiction, fisheries protection, patrols of vital state installations and border patrols (including armed checkpoints), air ambulance service and non-combatant evacuation.

== United Kingdom ==
In the United Kingdom, military aid to the civil community is one of the three classifications of military aid to the civil authorities. MACC covers the provision of unarmed military assistance to prevent or deal with the aftermath of a natural disaster or a major incident or, to assist civil sponsors either by carrying out special projects of significant social value to the community or by attaching individual volunteers to specific projects. As an example in 1968, the Royal Engineers formed a specialist squadron - 66 Plant Squadron based in Longmoor Hampshire from four specialist Plant troops (Southern (originally based in Longmoor), Midlands (originally based in Walsall, Northern originally based in Catterick and Scotland (originally based in Edinburgh). 66 Plant Squadron was at the time the biggest single Royal Engineers squadron with a large amount of Plant equipment (bulldozers, tippers, graders, rollers, excavators, cranes, and its transport vehicles). It consisted of 4 Troops, plus a HQ troop, a LAD (Light Aid Detachment from REME) and a Equipment & Stores Troop. Examples of MACC assistance carried out was the Cleaning up after the Torrey Canyon Incident when an Oil tanker ran onto rocks in the South West of England and 66 Plant squadron was tasked to clean up the beaches of oil residue, rebuilding Oekyel Bridge in Scotland after floods, building an airstrip between Kylakin and Broadford on the Isle of Skye, building and maintaining ranges in various locations on Salisbury Plain, enhancing the Tank proving grounds at Bovington (Royal Armoured Corps Training centre in Dorset), Exercise Waterleap in Canada, Dredging the Avon & Kennett Canal in Southern England to allow recreational boating, and building the range butts at Bisley in Hants. In addition various overseas MACC deployments were to Singapore, Malawi, Kenya and Canada.

== United States ==
In the United States, military activities are generally severely limited, however, military assistance in rescue operations is common. This includes the national guard, who frequently are called to respond to domestic emergencies and natural disasters such as floods and severe weather, as well as elements of the regular and reserve armed forces when their expertise or equipment is needed, such as in response to Hurricane Katrina (US Naval hospital ships), the 2013 Colorado floods, and the 2014 Oso, Washington landslide.

== See also ==
- Territorial Army (United Kingdom)
