= 4th Combat Engineer Regiment (Australia) =

Australian Army engineer unit

- Active: 1 July 1995 – 2013
- Country: Australia
- Branch: Army
- Type: Royal Australian Engineers (RAE)
- Role: Combat engineers
- Part of: 4th Brigade
- Garrison/HQ: East Ringwood, Victoria
- Motto: Ubique
- March: Wings
- Mascot: Platypus

Commanders
- Current commander: LTCOL Glenn Pilbeam

Insignia
- Unit colour patch
- Abbreviation: 4 CER

4th Combat Engineer Regiment (4 CER) was an Australian Army Reserve engineer regiment based at East Ringwood, Victoria. Raised on 1 July 1995, upon formation, the regiment consisted of the 10th and 35th Field Squadrons and the 38th Support Squadron. It was an Army Reserve unit that provided engineering support to the 4th Brigade, and played a pivotal role in the ADF support to the 2003 Victorian Alpine Fires and the 2009 Black Saturday Fires. Throughout 2009, the regiment also contributed personnel to operations overseas, including deployments to Afghanistan and the Sinai; other personnel took part were detached to Rifle Company Butterworth and Operation Resolute. In 2013, 4 CER merged with the 22nd Construction Regiment, to form the 22nd Engineer Regiment.
