= 2nd Combat Engineer Regiment (Australia) =

Australian Army engineer unit

- Active: 24 November 1991 – present
- Country: Australia
- Branch: Australian Army
- Type: Combat engineer
- Part of: 7th Brigade
- Garrison/HQ: Gallipoli Barracks, Enoggera
- Nickname: The Magnificent Bastards
- Mottos: Semper Paratus — Always Ready! Ubique — Everywhere
- March: Waltzing Matilda / "Wings"
- Anniversaries: 18 June (Waterloo Dinner)

Insignia
- Unit colour patch
- Abbreviation: 2 CER

The 2nd Combat Engineer Regiment (2 CER) is an Australian Army combat engineer regiment located at Gallipoli Barracks in Brisbane, Queensland. It is part of the Australian 7th Brigade, attached to Forces Command (Australia).

2 CER's lineage is formally traced to 4th Field Company (4 Fd Coy) Royal Australian Engineers, which was raised in the early stages of World War I. Renamed 7th Field Company (7 Fd Coy) in 1915, the unit was renowned for its service in France and Belgium at the Battle of the Somme, Menin Road and on the Hindenburg Line. During World War II, 7 Fd Coy fought the Japanese at Kokoda and on Bougainville.

== History ==
=== World War I ===
The Defence Act (1903) precluded the deployment of Militia units outside Australian territory. To support British forces during World War I, the Australian government was required to raise an all-volunteer force for overseas service, known as the Australian Imperial Force (AIF; known later as the First AIF). The 4th Field Company was raised in New South Wales and renamed the 7th Field Company (7 Fd Coy) on 20 September 1915. The first parties from the company departed Sydney November or December 1915 on HMAT Suffolk, followed by several groups of reinforcements over the next few years.

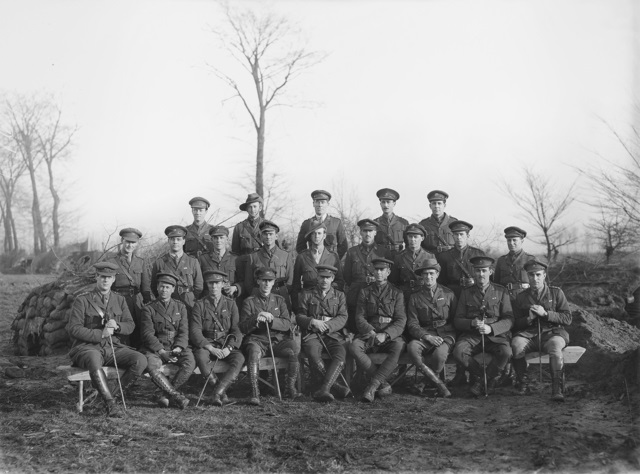
Officers from the 7th Field Company in Belgium, December 1917

Assigned to the 2nd Division, the company served in Egypt and France during World War I, where it saw action in the Battle of the Somme, Menin Road and the Hindenburg Line. Key roles undertaken by engineers during the war included field construction, signalling, obstacle breaching, tunnelling and mining, and river crossing and bridging tasks.

The company's final war diary entry was made in April 1919 just prior to their repatriation to Australia. It returned to Australia and disbanded on 23 May 1919. There are 77 entries for members of the company on the Australian War Memorial's Roll of Honour listing personnel who died while serving with the company. At least 480 personnel are believed to have served with the company during the war.

=== 1921–1939 ===
In 1921, the Australian government decided to restructure the part-time Citizens Forces units to replicate the numerical designations and perpetuate the honours of the AIF. As a result, on 1 May 1921, 7 Fd Coy was re-raised as part of the 1st Division, based in Ipswich.

=== World War II ===
During World War II, the Defence Act continued to bar the Militia from overseas service and the government raised a second Australian Imperial Force (Second AIF). Militia units also undertook brief periods of continuous service, for training and home defence duties. If AIF volunteers constituted more than 65% of a unit's personnel, the entire unit could be gazetted as an AIF unit and deployed overseas. (Note: That is, if more than 65% of a Militia unit were AIF personnel, the whole unit could be deemed to have volunteered for overseas service, and the restrictions upon use of Militia units under the Defence Act 1903 could be lifted. Later in the war, the Act was amended somewhat so that units with less than 65% AIF personnel could be deployed within the South West Pacific Area.)

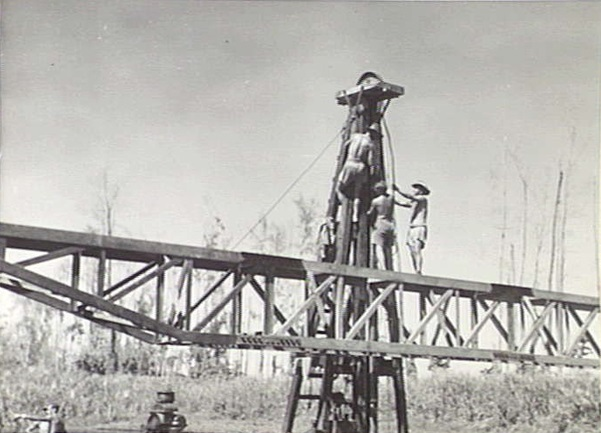
Sappers from the 11th Field Company bridging the Jaba River, Bougainville, May 1945

With Japan's entry into the war in December 1941, the Malayan Campaign and Fall of Singapore, the strategic situation worsened significantly. 7 Fld Coy was called out for full-time service within Australia in May 1942. Later, 7 Fld Coy was re-gazetted as an AIF unit. The unit served in Papua New Guinea and fought against the Japanese along the Kokoda Track and on Bougainville until the end of the war.

Another Militia sapper unit from Queensland, the 11th Field Company (which had been based at Kelvin Grove and Toowong before the war), also saw active service in New Guinea and Bougainville.

=== 1946–1951 ===
7 Fd Coy returned to Australia on 3 January 1946 and disbanded on 4 February 1946. On 19 June 1947, a Special Survey Troop was activated for employment on the proposed Rocket Range at Woomera and then later expanded. The unit was involved in the construction of facilities for the nuclear tests conducted at Emu Claypan during the 1950s. On 11 March 1949, this unit became the Special Construction Squadron, RAE and was renamed 7 Field Squadron (7 Fd Sqn). During the 1949 NSW coalminers' strike, 7 Fd Sqn was part of the controversial Operation Excavate, a strike-breaking exercise. (The Approved Defence Projects Protection Act of 1947 overturned provisions of the 1903 Act barring the use of defence personnel for such purposes.)

=== 1951–1989 ===
The unit was reassigned to 1 Field Engineer Regiment in June 1951, before being re-designated as 7 Independent Field Squadron and grouped with the 1st Infantry Brigade at Casula and Holsworthy. During this time, the unit provided the nucleus of personnel used to form the 1 RAR Assault Pioneer Platoon, which subsequently took part in operations along the Pusan Perimeter during the Korean War. In 1955, elements of the squadron – 4 Troop – deployed to South-East Asia and participated in the Malayan Emergency. On 28 December 1958, the unit deployed to Vanuatu to provide humanitarian support after a tropical cyclone. In June 1960, the Australian Military Forces were reorganised along a divisional basis with the adoption of the Pentropic organisation, and 7 Independent Field Squadron (redesignated 7 Fd Sqn) moved to Wacol, Queensland. Between June and December 1964, eight officers and 132 other ranks from 7 Fd Sqn deployed to North Borneo during the Indonesia Confrontation to conduct tasks such as the road 153km from Keningau to Sapulut and airstrip construction in Kuamut and Sapulut as well .

On 1 December 1971, Divisional Engineers re-organised into regiments and 7 Fd Sqn became part of the 2nd Field Engineer Regiment (2 FER) which was allocated under command Headquarters 6th Task Force at Enoggera, Queensland. 2 FER consisted of 7 Fd Sqn, 2 Field Squadron (2 Fd Sqn), 24 Support Squadron (24 Spt Sqn) and a Workshops. 17 Construction Squadron, on its return from Vietnam in late 1971, was renamed 17 Field Squadron (17 Fd Sqn) and in mid-1973 was merged with 7 Fd Sqn, 2 FER.

In August 1981, 2 FER became 2/3 FER following the disbandment of 1 FER and the merging of 3 FER. 2/3 FER was based at Enoggera, Queensland and now consisted of 1 Field Squadron (Holsworthy), 7 Fd Sqn (Enoggera), 18 Field Squadron (Townsville) and a Workshops. In July 1987, 35 Field Squadron and 11 Field Squadron (11 Fd Sqn—formerly 11th Field Company and ex-5 FER located at Kelvin Grove), were brought onto the 2/3 FER unit status. At the time, it was the single largest regiment on the Army Order of Battle.

=== 1989–1999 ===
In 1989, 7 Fd Sqn consisted of a Headquarters, 13th and 14th Field Troops and 24th Support Troop. In March that year, the United Nations acting under UN Resolution 435, formed a military force—United Nations Transitional Assistance Group (UNTAG)—for deployment to the war torn country of Namibia (formerly South West Africa) a protectorate of South Africa. The mission was to supervise the withdrawal of the South African Defence Force (SADF), assist those displaced by the war to return home, and to pave the way for the first 'free and fair' elections ever held in that country. The 17th Construction Squadron was mobilised for deployment and augmented by the 14th Field Troop. This contingent was sent to the northernmost part of Namibia, to an ex-SADF base at Ondangwa, in close proximity to the Angolan border for the majority of the deployment.

14th Field Troop was responsible for unexploded ordnance and landmine clearance tasks. They were deployed between March and September 1989 and handed over to elements of the 15th Field Troop, 18 Fd Sqn.

Following the Force Structure Review in 1991, 2/3 FER was broken into 1, 2 and 3 Combat Engineer Regiments (CERs) with 2 CER being raised first on 24 November 1991 and remaining at Enoggera. 2 CER is also the oldest of the CERs. 2 CER now became part of 7th Brigade and comprised 7 Combat Engineer Squadron (7 CE Sqn), 20 Engineer Support Squadron (previously 20 Divisional Engineer Support Squadron) and 11 Operational Support Squadron (logistic support and workshops). During the Ready Reserve experiment of the 1990s, 2 CER increased its establishment of Reserve members. In July 1997, when the 6th and 7th Brigades were amalgamated, 2 CER amalgamated 11 Field Squadron, and a platoon of combat engineers was detached to 6 RAR to take part in a motorisation trial.

=== Since 1999 ===
==== Sydney Olympics ====
2 CER next underwent a change during 1999, when it was assigned the task of forming and commanding the new Joint Incident Response Unit (JIRU), in support of the Sydney 2000 Olympic Games as part of Operation GOLD. The unit was split, with the majority of personnel moving to Holsworthy to form the JIRU (and subsequently the new Incident Response Regiment [IRR]), leaving a small Headquarters element and 7 CE Sqn in Enoggera. In July 2001, the Regiment underwent a force structure review which saw the unit grow in strength once again. 2 CER became a fully integrated unit consisting of a Regimental Headquarters, an Operational Support Troop (Catering Section, Q Store and Workshops), 7 CE Sqn (Reserve), 11 CE Sqn (Regular) and 20 Support Troop (Integrated).

==== East Timor ====
From April–October 2001, a composite engineer troop was deployed to support the 4 RAR Battalion Group in East Timor and undertook a wide variety of construction and combat engineering tasks along the border between East and West Timor. During November 2003 – June 2004, 2 CER supported the 6 RAR Battalion Group (AUSBATT IX) in East Timor. 2 CER subsequently led an independent Company Group in support of a multi-national United Nations Security Force as part of Operation SPIRE during the period December 2004 – June 2005. This force conducted a wide variety of support engineering and combat service support tasks in support of other United Nations forces deployed to the country. 2 CER elements returned to Timor Leste in the 8/9 RAR Timor-Leste Battle Group from January– October 2010, as part of Operation ASTUTE.

==== Banda Aceh ====
In December 2004, elements of 2 CER were deployed to provide humanitarian assistance in Banda Aceh (Operation SUMATRA ASSIST) after a tsunami was experienced within the Indonesian region and South West Pacific rim. 2 CER engineers provided civil military liaison support, cleared debris, recovered human remains, provided clean water and assisted with the humanitarian effort.

==== Afghanistan ====
2 CER deployed Squadron or larger size groups to Afghanistan's Orūzgān Province on four occasions as part of Operation SLIPPER. 2 CER(-) deployed as Reconstruction Task Force-2 over March – October 2007. 2 CER deployed a Combat Engineer Squadron Group as part of the 750 strong 6 RAR Task Group (also known as Mentoring Task Force-1) over February–October 2010, and subsequent Squadron Groups to the 8/9 RAR Task Group (MTF-4) and the 3 RAR Task Group (MTF-5) in 2012. 2 CER personnel were deployed in a wide variety of roles including training and mentoring members of the Afghan National Army, and undertaking route clearance, high-threat search, construction tasks and infantry missions. The regiment lost three soldiers killed in action and over 20 soldiers wounded in action.

==== Queensland floods ====
In January 2011, in the aftermath of the 2010–11 Queensland floods, 2 CER deployed throughout Brisbane and the surrounding region to assist with recovery and cleanup as part of Operation Queensland Flood Assist. 2 CER deployed elements to Bundaberg during Cyclone Oswald, notably building a military bridge over a flood-damaged highway bridge to re-open the Isis Highway over the Burnett River.

==== Operation Parapet 2014 ====
In 2014, 2 CER provided the foundation of the ADF's technical and high risk domestic search capability for the Group of Twenty (G20) meeting in Brisbane. Combined with elements from 1& 3 CER, 2 CER supported the Queensland Police Service through the provision of specialist explosive detection capabilities.

==== Operation Fiji Assist 2016 ====
Cyclone Winston had a devastating effect on the people of Fiji in February 2016. As the online Engineer Squadron, 7 CE Squadron initially deployed at short notice with plant operators and tradesman from 24 Spt Squadron and logistics support staff from the Operational Support Squadron, to provide Humanitarian Assistance and Disaster Relief as part of the Amphibious Task Force assigned to support the people of Fiji. They were subsequently reinforced with members of 2 CE Squadron after the return to Australia of the Amphibious Task Force. The Engineers worked with the Republic of Fiji Military Forces, initially on Koro Island and subsequently in Rakiraki on the main island, to alleviate suffering and assist in a return to normalcy. The works included repairs to roads, infrastructure, schools, medical facilities, hazard reduction, structural assessments and debris clearance.

==== Other missions and future role ====
Throughout its history, individual members of the unit have also been involved in operations in Cambodia, Somalia, Pakistan, Rwanda, the Solomon Islands and Bougainville, and support to police during the several Commonwealth Heads of Government Meetings (CHOGM). In addition to its military role, 2 CER also works closely with the local Queensland community in times of emergency. This was demonstrated in November 2008 following the worst storms in Brisbane since 1985 when 2 CER co-ordinated the large scale Defence-assisted relief efforts.

In 2008, it was announced that the regiment would receive new barracks in 2014 as part of the Australian Army's Enhanced Land Force (ELF) initiative. The regiment raised another regular squadron, designated 2 Combat Engineer Squadron, in 2011. In 2012, 2 CER became the largest combat engineer unit in the Australian Army. With the establishment of the 11th Engineer Regiment, 11 Combat Engineer Squadron was scheduled for transfer to the new Reserve unit on 1 January 2015.

2 CER has an official Bond of Friendship with 2 Combat Engineer Regiment in Petawawa, Canada.

== Composition ==
- Regimental HQ
  - 2 Combat Engineer Squadron
    - 10 Troop
    - 11 Troop
  - 7 Combat Engineer Squadron
    - 12 Troop
    - 13 Troop
    - 14 Troop
  - 24 Support Squadron
    - Plant Troop
    - Construction Troop
    - Specialist Troop
    - Emergency Response Troop
  - Operational Support Squadron
    - Workshops
    - Q-Store

== Notes ==
Footnotes

Citations
