= 6th Engineer Support Regiment (Australia) =

Australian Army engineer unit

- Active: 2003–present
- Country: Australia
- Branch: Australian Army
- Role: Engineer support
- Size: ~ 450 personnel
- Part of: 17th Sustainment Brigade
- Garrison/HQ: Zabul Lines, Amberley, Queensland
- Mottos: With Strength and Precision
- Engagements: War in Afghanistan (2001–2021)

Commanders
- Current commander: LTCOL Matt Dobney

Insignia
- Unit colour patch

The 6th Engineer Support Regiment (6 ESR) is a specialised engineer regiment of the Australian Army. Established in early 2003, the regiment was formed by grouping several previously independent engineer squadrons – each providing different engineer support functions – together under a single headquarters. Headquartered at RAAF Base Amberley in Queensland, the regiment's sub-units are also based in Queensland.

== History ==
The regiment was formed on 13 January 2003, in order to serve as the administrative headquarters for a number of squadron-level subunits, which had previously been independent.

Attached to the 6th Brigade, the regiment's subunits – the 17th and 21st Construction Squadrons, the 1st Topographical Survey Squadron and the 20th Explosive Ordnance Disposal Squadron – were spread across three different locations: Gallipoli Barracks in Enoggera; RAAF Base Amberley in Amberley; and Holsworthy Barracks in Holsworthy. These subunits are supported by a fifth subunit, the Operational Support Squadron.

By virtue of the regiment's function, the majority of its 600 personnel are regular soldiers drawn from the Royal Australian Engineers, although various other corps provide administration clerks, drivers, mechanics and quartermasters. Personnel from the regiment have undertaken numerous deployments since its establishment, and the regiment provided the headquarters element for Reconstruction Task Force 4, which deployed to Afghanistan in 2008 as part of Operation Slipper.

The 1st Topographical Survey Squadron was reassigned to the 1st Intelligence Battalion. The 17th Construction Squadron relocated to RAAF Base Amberley in Queensland from Holsworthy Barracks in New South Wales.

When the 6th Brigade was disbanded in December 2024 the 6th Engineer Support Regiment was transferred to the 17th Sustainment Brigade.

== Structure ==
The regiment consists of the following units:

Amberley

- Regimental Headquarters
- 17th Construction Squadron
- 21st Construction Squadron
- Operational Support Squadron
- 20th Explosive Ordnance Disposal Squadron
