= 22nd Engineer Regiment (Australia) =

Australian Army engineer unit

- Active: 1950–present
- Country: Australia
- Branch: Australian Army
- Role: Military engineering
- Part of: 4th Brigade, 2nd Division
- Garrison/HQ: Ringwood East
- Motto: Ubique
- March: Wings
- Mascot: Platypus
- Anniversaries: 18 June (Waterloo Dinner)

Insignia
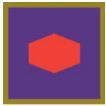
- Unit colour patch
- Abbreviation: 22 ER

The 22nd Engineer Regiment (22 ER) is an Australian Army engineer unit based in Victoria, Australia, and as part of the 4th Brigade, the regiment provides engineer support to the 2nd Division. It was formerly designated as the 22nd Construction Regiment, and raised as a construction regiment, but was renamed to its current form in 2013, following its amalgamation with the 4th Combat Engineer Regiment. It consists predominantly of Australian Army Reserve soldiers, and is supplemented by an Australian Regular Army component staff. It is the Senior Engineer Regiment in the 2nd Division, and the second most Senior Engineer Regiment in the Australian Army after the 3rd Combat Engineer Regiment.

== History ==
The 22nd Regiment was originally raised in July 1950 as a unit of the "supplementary reserve", which was formed within the Citizens Military Force to utilise the personnel and resources of various civilian government organisations to raise a military construction capability. The regiment's first commanding officer was Lieutenant Colonel I.J. O'Donell and its first annual camp took place at Puckapunyal, with 20 officers and 220 other ranks taking part. Upon formation, the regiment consisted of the 104th, 105th and 106th Construction Squadrons and the 107th Plant Squadron (Heavy).

The Regiment currently consists of a regimental headquarters (RHQ), a works section and three engineer squadrons. RHQ is based in Dublin Road, Ringwood East, along with 8th Combat Engineer Squadron. 105th Construction Squadron is based at Oakleigh, Victoria, while the 10th Combat Engineer Squadron is based at Newborough in Gippsland, Victoria.

The Regiment has been providing construction and works support to nearly every Army Aboriginal Community Assistance Program (AACAP) task since the Federal Government directed these tasks to begin in 1997. The Regiment has also been involved in providing Defence Aid to the Civil Community since the 1960s, in particular supporting the emergency services and local communities in disaster response. Over the past 10 years the Regiment has led the ADF response to Victoria's bushfires, in particular the 2003 Alpine Fires, the 2006 Gippsland Fires, and in 2009 it was initially the lead element in the Black Saturday fires. Since the Regiment was raised it has deployed Army Reserve engineers to Papua New Guinea, South Vietnam, Bougainville, East Timor (Timor L'este), Solomon Islands and Afghanistan.

== Organisation ==
The unit currently consists of:

- Regimental Headquarters
- 8th Combat Engineer Squadron
- 10th Combat Engineer Squadron
- 105th Construction Squadron
