= 1st Combat Engineer Regiment (Australia) =

Australian Army engineer unit

- Active: 1 March 1993–present
- Country: Australia
- Branch: Australian Army
- Type: Combat engineer
- Part of: 1st Brigade
- Mascot(s): Sand goanna (Varanus Panoptes)

Commanders
- Commander 1 Combat Engineer Regiment: Lieutenant Colonel Travis Day

Insignia
- Unit colour patch
- Abbreviation: 1 CER

The 1st Combat Engineer Regiment (1 CER) is a combat engineer regiment of the Australian Army. Based in the Northern Territory and attached to 1st Brigade, it is a Regular Army unit of the Royal Australian Engineers and is tasked with providing mobility and counter mobility support.

== History ==
1 CER was raised on 1 March 1993, built around 1 Field Squadron RAE, itself raised from 1st Field Engineer Regiment (1FER) in July 1981 at Holsworthy Barracks, in Sydney. 1 Field Squadron, draws lineage from 1 Field Company that was raised as part of the First Australian Imperial Force during World War I.

The regiment moved from Sydney in late 1999 to Robertson Barracks, Darwin. 2 Troop, 1 Field Squadron was deployed to East Timor during this time as part of INTERFET. In April 2000, 1 Troop, 1 Field Squadron replaced 2 Troop and began its six-month deployment in support of 6 RAR. The pro-Indonesian Militia reorganized, rearmed, and returned to harass the peacekeeping operations during this time. 1 Troop conducted road repairs, water purification, and constructed strong points throughout the Australian AO. In October 2000, 1 Troop was relieved by 3 Troop, 9 Field Squadron.

In late 2002, 73 personnel were used to form a Battalion Engineer Group to attach to 5th/7th Battalion, Royal Australian Regiment (5/7 RAR) for a deployment to East Timor as part of the United Nations Mission of Support to East Timor (UNMISET). Among the duties performed by the engineers, above aiding 5/7 RAR, included the provision of humanitarian aid, construction of infrastructure for the East Timorese law enforcement agencies, and provision of supplementary infantry patrols.

From April to August 2003, elements from 1 CER were deployed as part of Operation Relex II. The sappers alternated between land-based training and periods embarked on Royal Australian Navy vessels assigned to Relex, where they aided Navy personnel in boarding and searching Suspected Illegal Entry Vessels (SIEVs), boat handling, and other duties. During this deployment, personnel from 1 CER were involved in boarding and detaining SIEV 13, and the subsequent transfer of those aboard to the Christmas Island Immigration Detention Centre.

Also in 2003, 1 CER was granted approval to use the Sand Goanna (Varanus Panoptes) as a mascot.

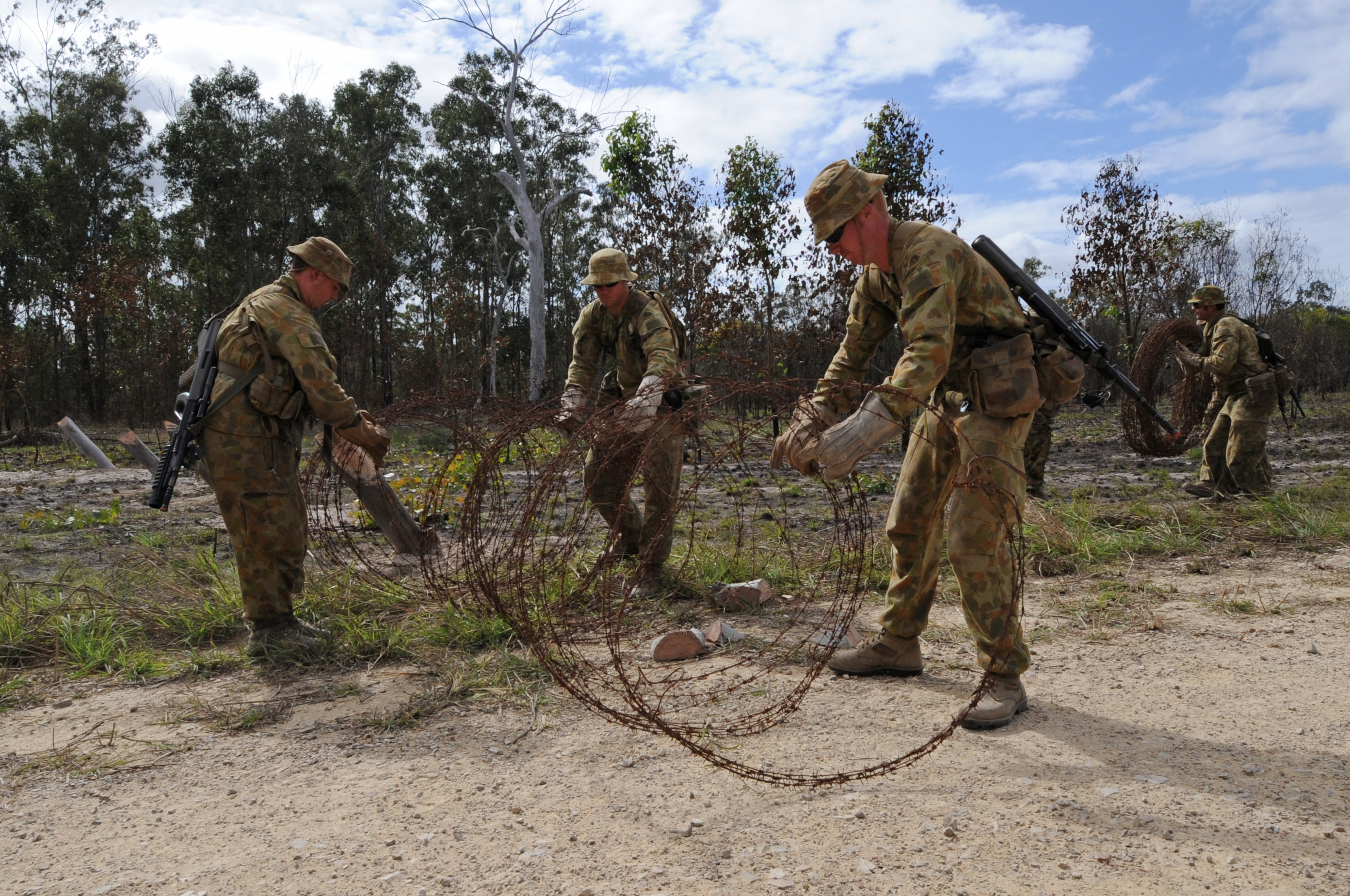
Members of 1 CER laying down barbed wire obstacles during Exercise Talisman Sabre 2009

From late 2006 to mid-2007, a third of 1 CER was deployed to Tarin Kowt, Afghanistan, as the 1st Reconstruction Task Force, the Australian contribution to a Dutch-led Provincial Reconstruction Team. During this deployment, the remainder of 1 CER carried out a heavy training schedule.

In late 2008, personnel from 1 Field Squadron and 23 Support Squadron were sent to Afghanistan on an eight-month deployment as part of the 1st Mentoring and Reconstruction Task Force, during which Corporal Michael Anthony Cole was awarded the Order of Australia Medal. The rest of the regiment was involved in training and trials of the PackBot military robot (the Scout and Explorer variants) for Australian use.

In July 2009, 1 CER and 5th Battalion, Royal Australian Regiment served as the opposing force during Exercise Talisman Sabre 2009.

In January 2005, the 9 Field Squadron Group provided Disaster Relief and Humanitarian Support in response to the magnitude 7.6 earthquake that struck off Western Sumatra on 26 December 2004. During this period, members of the regiment provided critical engineering support including water purification to the local population of Banda Aceh. The efforts of the Squadron group led to them being recipients of a Chief of the Defence Force gold level Commendation.

== Structure ==
The regiment's current consists of a headquarters element, two field squadrons, a support squadron and an operational support squadron:

- 1st Combat Engineer Regiment Headquarters - Robertson Barracks, Darwin NT
- 1 Field Squadron - Robertson Barracks, Darwin NT
- 9 Field Squadron - Robertson Barracks, Darwin NT
- 23 Support Squadron - Robertson Barracks, Darwin NT
- Operational Support Squadron - Robertson Barracks, Darwin NT
