= Royal Australian Engineers =

Administrative corps of the Australian Army

- Badge
- Active: 1 July 1902 – present
- Country: Australia
- Branch: Australian Army
- Type: Corps
- Role: Military engineering
- Nickname: Ginger Beers
- Mottos: Ubique (Everywhere); Honi soit qui mal y pense (Shame on who thinks ill of it) "First In, Last Out"
- March: "Wings"
- Anniversaries: 18 June (Waterloo Dinner)
- Engagements: RAE is not awarded battle honours.

Insignia
- RAE Banner

The Royal Australian Engineers (RAE) is the military engineering corps of the Australian Army. The RAE is ranked fourth in seniority of the corps of the Australian Army, behind the Staff Cadets, Armoured and Artillery Corps. The corps was formed by the amalgamation of the various colonial engineer corps of the states and territories of Australia in 1902 and since then has served in various conflicts including World War I, World War II and the Vietnam War. The corps has also served on numerous peacekeeping operations and was heavily involved in the Australian contribution to the war in Afghanistan.

== History ==
The origins of the Royal Australian Engineers date back to 15 November 1860, when the Corps of Engineers was founded in the colony of Victoria by Peter Scratchley. By 1876, five of the six colonies—New South Wales, Victoria, Queensland, Tasmania, and Western Australia—had raised their own engineer units. These were amalgamated on 1 July 1902 as the Corps of Engineers. At this time, the corps consisted of field, fortress, telegraph, electric and submarine mining companies. After Federation the small regular engineer component was granted the prefix "Royal"; however, the Militia remained part of the "Australian Engineers".

In 1911, the Australian Corps of Signallers was absorbed into the Engineers as the RAE Signal Service. Four years later, in July 1915, all members of the Survey Section RAE, separated to form the Australian Survey Corps. During this period the School of Military Engineering was established at Moore Park in Sydney. During World War I, there were approximately 40 engineering units raised as part of the First Australian Imperial Force. These units included field engineering units, tunneling companies, railway units and signalling squadrons which served at Gallipoli, the Sinai, Palestine, France and Belgium. Following the end of the war the School of Military Engineering was disbanded.

On 1 January 1925 the RAE Signal Service was separated to form the Australian Corps of Signals. This was followed in 1932 by the Survey Section separating to form the Australian Survey Corps. The regular Permanent Force and reserve Citizen Military Forces (CMF) engineer units were brought together in January 1936 as the "Corps of Royal Australian Engineers". In 1939 the School of Military Engineering was re-established at Steele Barracks in Liverpool, New South Wales.

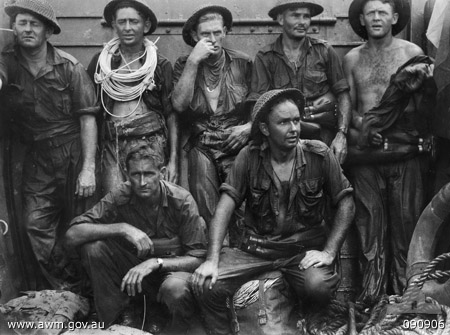
Engineers at Tarakan, 1945

During the inter-war years the RAE maintained a force of 233 regular troops and a militia force of 1,750. With the outbreak of World War II, however, the corps was expanded greatly, eventually reaching a peak of 32,984 men in 1945. RAE units of the Second Australian Imperial Force and militia served in North Africa, Malaya, New Guinea and Borneo campaigns.

Following the end of the war, the size of the corps was once again reduced. Nevertheless, the various units and sub-units of the RAE have been deployed on many overseas operations since 1945. During the Korean War there were no formed engineer units deployed by the Australian Army, although individual members of the RAE were deployed with the 1st Commonwealth Division. Later, RAE units deployed as part of the Australian commitment to the Malayan Emergency, Confrontation and the Vietnam War. They have also been deployed overseas to carry out construction work in New Guinea.

During the Vietnam War, the RAE maintained a force of about 1,000 personnel in South Vietnam where they served as part of the 1st Australian Task Force. Following the end of the war the size of the Australian Army was decreased in line with the abolition of the national service scheme and as a consequence of this and a number of lessons that came out of the deployment to Vietnam the RAE underwent a series of changes. One of the most significant changes came in 1972 and was the decision to establish full regimental sized engineer units, as opposed to squadron or company sized units. These units were initially known as Field Engineer Regiments but have subsequently become known as Combat Engineer Regiments. As a part of this restructuring the RAE was reorganised to raise one regiment for each brigade and the Corps lost its responsibility for maintaining water transport and engineering stores.

Since the late 1980s members of the Corps have been involved in combat and peacekeeping operations in Namibia, Rhodesia, Pakistan, Kurdistan, Cambodia, Somalia, Rwanda, Bougainville and Mozambique as well as Timor Leste, the Solomon Islands, Iraq and Afghanistan. On 1 July 1996 the RAE reabsorbed the Royal Australian Survey Corps.

== Corps titles ==
Over the course of its existence, the corps has held the following titles:

- July 1902 to September 1907 – "Corps of Engineers"
- September 1907 to January 1936 – "Australian Engineers"
- On 31 January 1936, the corps was given Royal Assent, and was subsequently renamed the "Royal Australian Engineers".

== Traditions ==
=== Motto ===
The motto of the Royal Australian Engineers is Ubique (Everywhere), a motto shared with RAE's parent corps, the Royal Engineers. This motto was bestowed by King William IV in 1832 in recognition that both Sappers and Gunners were not entitled to carry Regimental Colours and typically served as small detachments instead of a whole unit.

The original motto of the RAE, adopted at Federation was Facimus et Frangimus (We make and we break) and appeared on the engineer hat badge up until 1947 when it was replaced by Honi soit qui mal y pense. It now only appears on the Corps Cipher.

The current engineer hat badge features a leather garter adorned with a crown and the motto Honi soit qui mal y pense (Shame on him who thinks ill of it), mirroring the motto of the Order of the Garter. This honour was awarded to the RAE in 1947 for their efforts during World War II.

=== Sappers ===
The Royal Australian Engineers also adopted the Royal Engineers practice of calling their private soldiers "Sappers", in recognition of the fact that the very earliest engineers had been primarily concerned with driving saps (tunnels) both towards the enemy lines, and underneath fortifications.

=== Colours ===
Although the Corps does not carry official regimental colours such as those carried by infantry units, the basic Royal Australian Engineers colours are red (primary) and blue. Typically, however, unit colour patches, consist of a red feature on a purple field. The banner or flag depiction of the colours consists of a red field with two horizontal blue bands near the top and bottom of the field. This, in keeping with the Corps of Royal Engineers, represents two rivers shown in blue with the red background representing all the lives lost to achieve the crossing. If a unit title is shown it is shown in yellow.

=== Waterloo Dinner ===
The Waterloo Dinner is an annual dinner for commissioned officers held by units of the Royal Australian Engineers, although some smaller units may permit other ranks to attend. It is traditionally held on or about 18 June in commemoration of the first dinner, held by members of the corps at Gallipoli in 1915 to celebrate the completion of Watson's Pier at Anzac Cove. In recognition of the officer who led the construction of the pier, Lieutenant Stanley Watson, a signals officer within the Royal Australian Engineers, an officer of the Royal Australian Signals Corps attends each dinner as a guest. The name Waterloo was used because the first dinner was observed on the 100th anniversary of the Battle of Waterloo.

== Current roles ==
The RAE provides combat engineering, construction, and other technical support to the Australian Defence Force. Its main roles are to provide mobility, counter mobility and sustainability capabilities to the Australian Army and its allies. This means enhancing the ability of friendly forces to move while denying movement to enemy forces. In order to provide these capabilities, engineers are required to conduct many tasks, including penetrating minefields, locating and disarming booby traps, clearing unexploded ordnance, conducting explosive demolitions, purifying water, surveying, and building and maintaining roads, airfields, and bridges. The Corps also performs the majority of the Australian Army's demolition tasks and is trained to fight as infantry if needed.

== Current structure ==
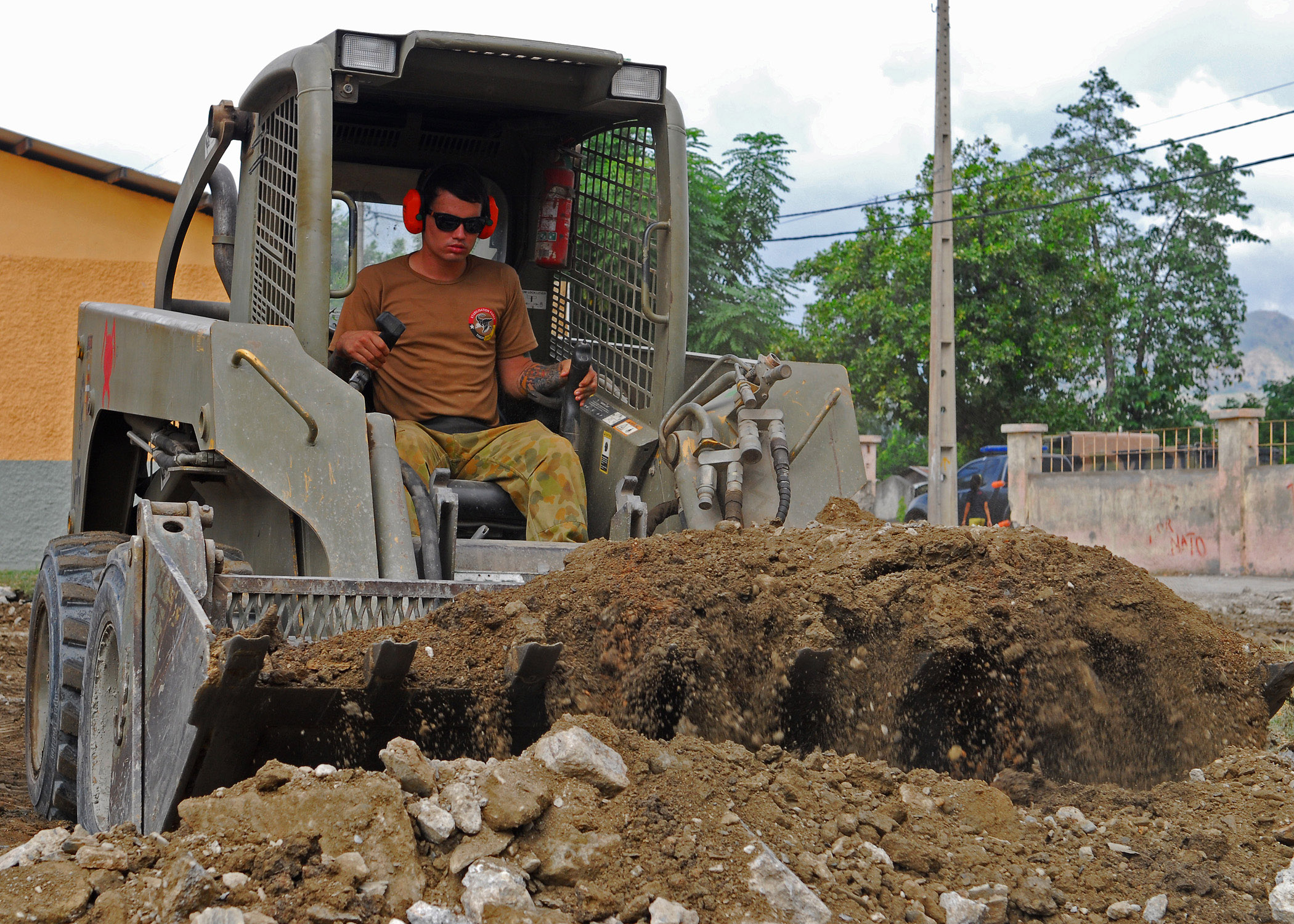
An RAE sapper assigned to the International Stabilisation Force, Dili, Timor Leste, 2010

The corps has both Regular and Reserve units, which are situated across the country within the Army's three regular manoeuvre brigades – the 1st, 3rd and 7th Brigades – and within the Reserve 2nd Division.

The current Regular units are:

- 1st Combat Engineer Regiment (Darwin)
  - 1st Field Squadron
  - 9th Field Squadron
  - 23rd Support Squadron
  - Operational Support Squadron
- 2nd Combat Engineer Regiment (Brisbane)
  - 2nd Combat Engineer Squadron
  - 7th Combat Engineer Squadron
  - 24th Support Squadron
  - Operational Support Squadron
- 3rd Combat Engineer Regiment (Townsville)
  - 16th Combat Engineer Squadron
  - 18th Combat Engineer Squadron
  - 25th Support Squadron
  - Operational Support Squadron
- 6th Engineer Support Regiment (Amberley)
  - 17th Construction Squadron
  - 21st Construction Squadron
  - 20th Explosive Ordnance Disposal Squadron
- School of Military Engineering (Sydney, Holsworthy), Combined Arms Training Centre
- 12th Chief Engineer Works (Brisbane)
- 19th Chief Engineer Works (Sydney, Randwick)
- Special Operations Engineer Regiment (SOER)

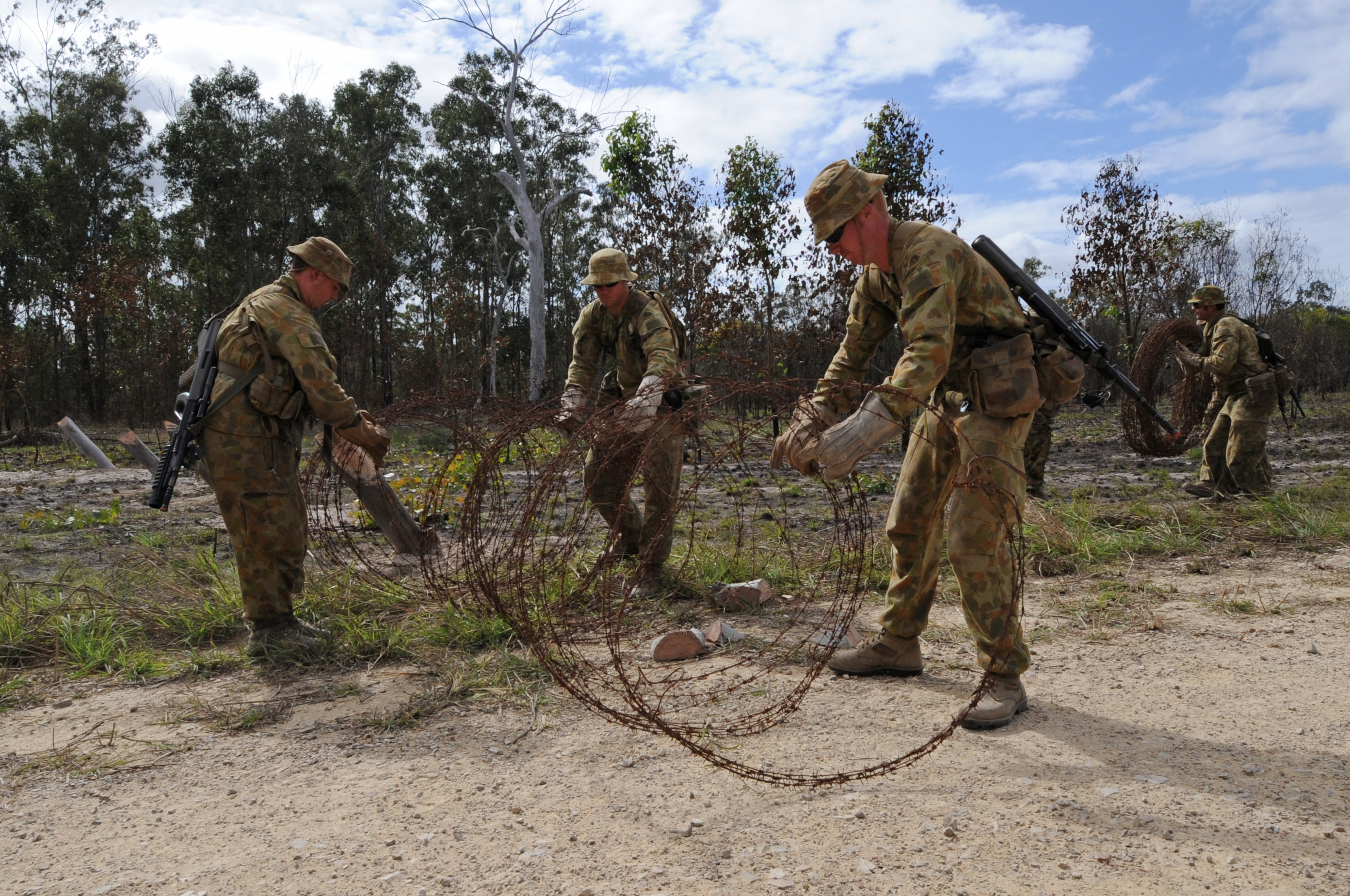
Sappers from 1 CER, 2009

The current Reserve (part-time) units are:

- 5th Engineer Regiment (Newcastle/Sydney/Canberra)
  - 4th Combat Engineer Squadron
  - 5th Combat Engineer Squadron
  - 14th Combat Engineer Squadron
  - 101st Construction Squadron
- 10th/27th Battalion, Royal South Australia Regiment (Adelaide) – one engineer squadron as a sub-unit
  - 3rd Field Squadron
- 11th Engineer Regiment (Brisbane/Greenbank/Rockhampton/Townsville)
  - 11th Combat Engineer Squadron
  - 35th Combat Engineer Squadron
  - 104th Construction Squadron
- 13th Engineer Regiment (Perth)
  - 13th Field Squadron
  - 22nd Engineer Squadron
- 22nd Engineer Regiment (Ringwood East, Victoria)
  - 8th Combat Engineer Squadron
  - 10th Combat Engineer Squadron
  - 105th Construction Squadron

== Order of precedence ==
Preceded by Royal Australian Artillery	Australian Army Order of Precedence	Succeeded by Royal Australian Corps of Signals
