= Australia's Federation Guard =

Australian ceremonial military unit

- Active: 7 March 2000 – present
- Country: Australia
- Type: Ceremonial unit
- Size: One augmented (tri-service) Company
- Part of: Australian Defence Force
- Garrison/HQ: Canberra
- Nickname: The Guard
- Colours: Green & Gold
- Equipment: L1A1 SLR, M101 105mm Howitzer

Insignia
- Unit Colour Patch

Australia's Federation Guard (AFG) is a tri-service ceremonial unit made up of members from the Royal Australian Navy, Australian Army, and Royal Australian Air Force. Formed in 2000, for the centenary celebrations of the Federation of Australia, it is the first purely ceremonial unit in the history of the Australian armed forces, and has since represented Australia in various roles both at home and around the world, including providing the Queen's Guard at Buckingham Palace in 2000. Since its inception AFG has supported many notable events, such as: the Royal Edinburgh Military Tattoos held in Australia 2005, 2010 and 2019, the ANZAC commemorations in Western Europe between 2014 and 2018, Queen Elizabeth II's Silver and Platinum Jubilees in the UK, Queen Elizabeth II's Funeral in the UK 2022, and King Charles III's Coronation in the UK in 2023.

== Composition ==
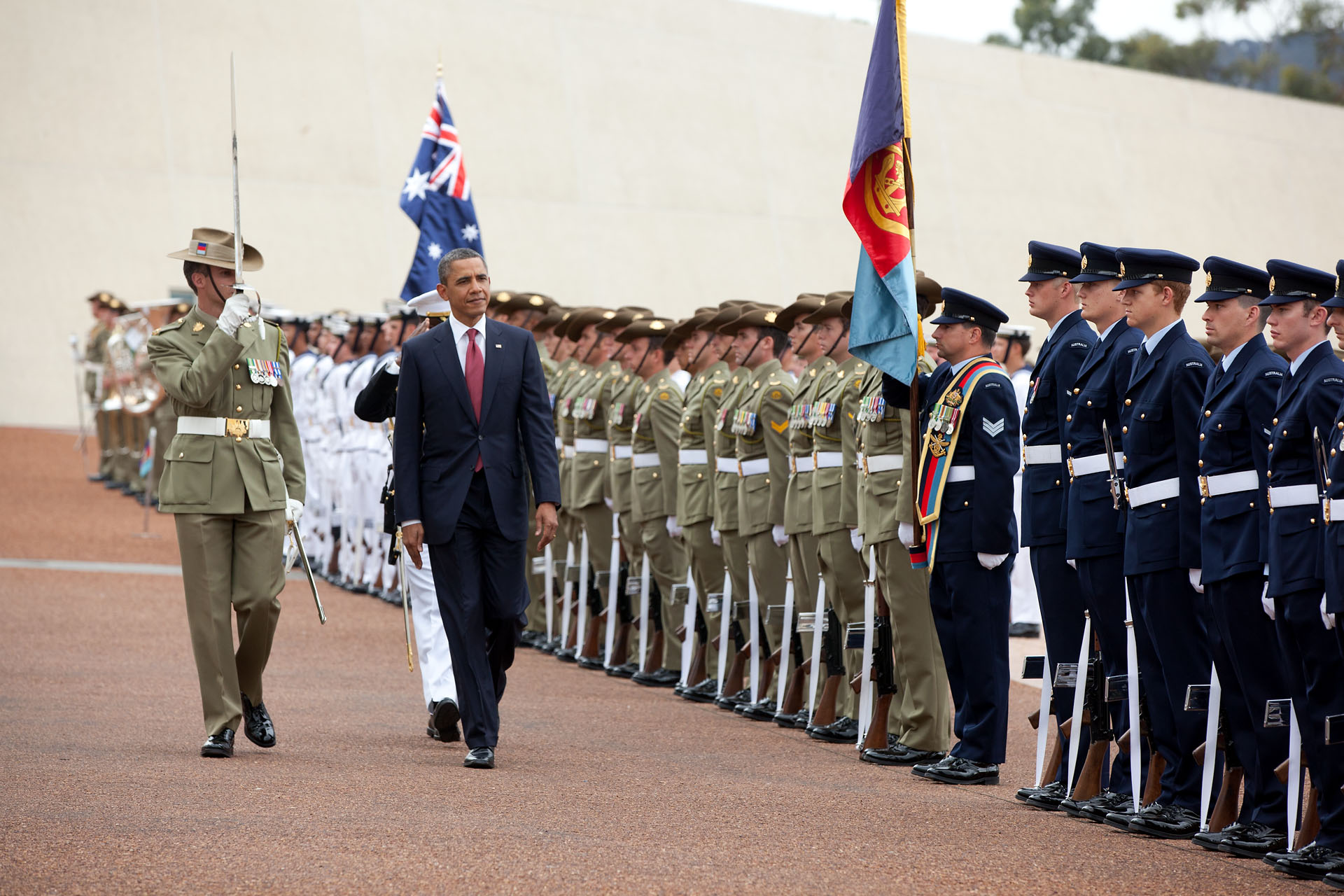
U.S President Barack Obama reviews Australia's Federation Guard in the forecourt of Parliament House during his visit to Australia in November 2011.

The posting strength of AFG varies, although the unit's authorised strength is around 170 personnel of all ranks. A Royal Guard consists of 32 members from each service, one left marker, one right marker, two flag bearers and one parade officer. The Navy contingent of the Guard always appears on the left-hand side of a parade, with Army in the centre and RAAF on the right. This reflects the seniority of the services.

Every member enlists into a specific trade in either the Royal Australian Navy, Australian Army or Royal Australian Air Force, but puts those services on hold for the duration of their 2-3 year tenure in AFG. Although formed initially for the centenary celebrations, the standard of the Guard was such that it was kept on as a showcase of the ceremonial capabilities of the Australian Defence Force, serving in various public duties capacities. Those tasks range from domestic to international, including but not limited to: Royal Guards, Half Guards, Credential Guards, Stair Guards, Catafalque Parties, Military Funerals, parades, and Precision Drill Team displays.

For administrative purposes the unit is divided into four sub-units, a headquarters element and three mixed service "divisions". Each division is commanded by an officer from a different service. The position of Guard Commanding Officer is on a rotation between the three services. The Guard Sergeant Major is an Australian Army position.

== Roles ==
Although it is primarily a ceremonial guard unit, equipped with the L1A1 SLR, the Guard also provides gun salutes. These salutes can be performed anywhere, although for practical reasons are usually only utilised in the Canberra district. Depending on the situation, personnel from all three services operate up to six guns, with four to six personnel servicing each gun under the command of Army personnel from the Royal Australian Artillery.

AFG also contains a Drum Corps, made up from volunteers from all three services posted to the unit. Drum Corps members participate in additional training with the majority having no previous musical experience with percussion instruments. Drum Corps members perform their drumming duties in addition to their traditional Guard duties and will often support the Precision Drill Team in their training and performances.

In 2000, AFG provided the Queen's Guard at Buckingham Palace. In performing this duty, AFG was responsible not only for providing the first naval sentries (although the Royal Marines had in the past provided the guard, the Royal Navy had not yet done so), but also the first women to serve. The Guard alternated with the 1st Battalion, Coldstream Guards, with each service providing a detachment on each day.

== Precision Drill Team ==
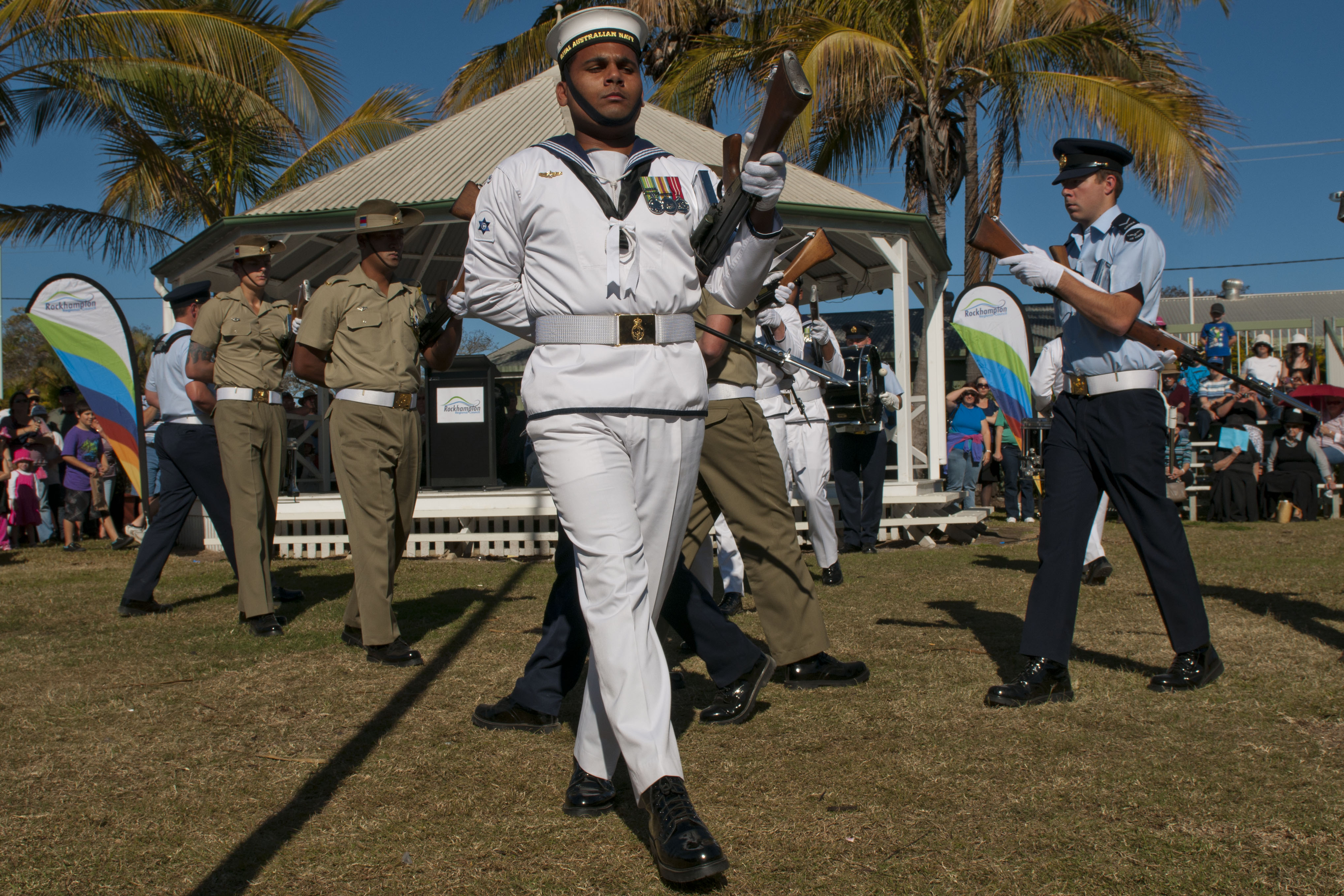
Members of Australia's Federation Guard during a display in 2011.

Within AFG is a smaller group who form the Precision Drill Team (PDT). The PDT travel around Australia to perform at events such as careers expos, charity functions and sporting events. The drills performed by the PDT are a combination of over 300 specific movements without any words of command being given to the Guardsmen. The Soldiers, Sailors and Airmen that make up the PDT have a high level of skill, concentration and teamwork which is perfected through many hours of practice.

== Uniforms ==
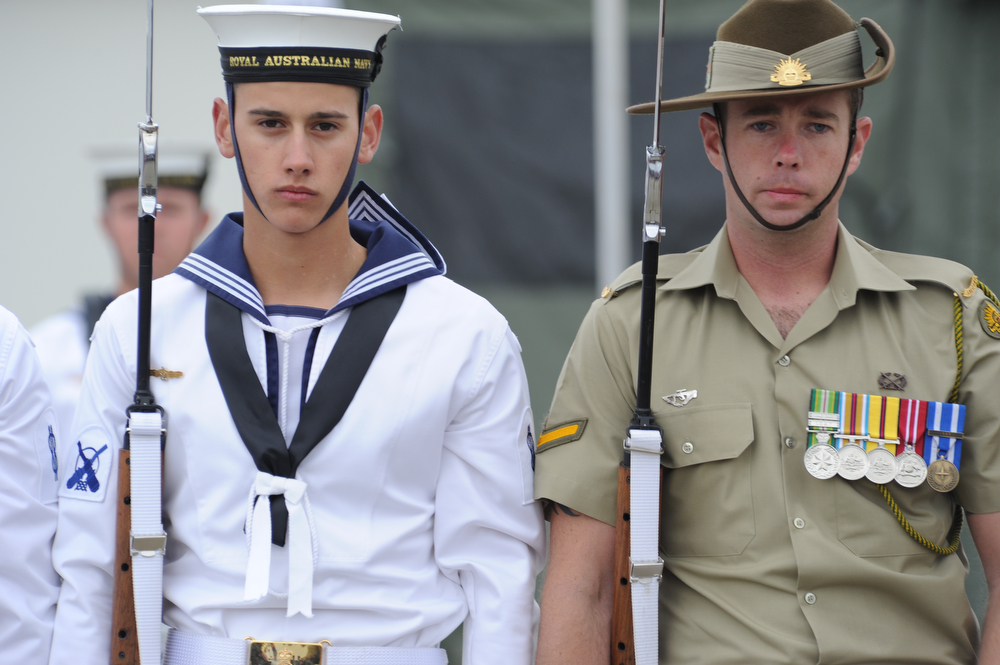
An Australian sailor and soldier wearing formal uniforms.

Members of the Royal Australian Navy and Royal Australian Air Force posted to the unit perform their ceremonial duties in the standard ceremonial uniforms of their service as the variance between trades is minimal. A notable addition to the uniform is the white "airman's belt" worn by all other ranks.

For members of the Australian Army, uniforms vary significantly between corps with embellishments differing between silver, gold and black. All corps have unique cap badges with some corps having individual unit badges, such as the Royal Australian Armoured Corps. The Guard is considered a "non-corps posting" by the Australian Army and wears "non-corps" generic army embellishments for the sake of uniformity. These generic embellishments consist of miniature Rising Sun badges worn in place of corps badges on the hat and collars, complemented by gold jacket buttons and rank insignia. A generic tri-service colour patch is worn by all Army members of the AFG as the unit colour patch.

A number of submissions have been made in relation to approving an official unit badge that would be worn on the hats of serving members but none have currently been approved. However, an approved unit badge has been adopted by the unit and features the ADF tri-service crest in silver against a gold federation star.

== Musical support ==
The Guard has the Australian Defence Force's only dedicated drum corps. However, the Guard does not have its own band. The majority of musical support for ceremonial duties within the Canberra region is provided by the Band of the Royal Military College, Duntroon. When performing in other parts of Australia, other Defence bands such as the Royal Australian Navy Band, the Australian Army Band Corps or the Royal Australian Air Force Band provide musical support for the Guard.

== See also ==
- Household Division
