= Australian Army Band Sydney =

- Active: 1991; 34 years ago
- Country: Australia
- Branch: Australian Army
- Type: Unit Band
- Size: 22 members
- Part of: Forces Command (Australia)
- Garrison/HQ: Victoria Barracks, Sydney
- Nickname(s): AAB-S

The Australian Army Band Sydney (AAB-S) is a full time military band of the Australian Army. It is a sub-unit of the Australian Army Band Corps, the army's official music branch.

An Army band was first formed in 1874 as the resident band at Victoria Barracks in Sydney. In the 1950s, a band was formed that became the Eastern Command Band. After a reorganisation of the Army in 1972, all military bands were either disbanded or renamed, which resulted in the Eastern Command Band being renamed in 1974 to the Band of the 2nd Military District. In 1991, the titles of all bands were changed to reflect their geographical identity, which resulted in it being renamed to Australian Army Band Sydney. The band provides ceremonial musical support to the City of Sydney, including national, state, and vice-regal events.

For this, the AAB-S operates the following ensembles:

- Marching Band
- Saxophone Quartet
- Brass Quartet
- Jazz Band
- Acoustic Group
- Pep Band
- Rock Band
- Big Band

The band also has a solo pianist, a lone drummer as well as a lone bugler in its ranks. There is also a jazz band was nominated by ARIA for Best Contemporary Jazz Album in 2003, promoting the works of contemporary composers and arrangers whilst upholding the traditional standards of swing music.

Many musicians from the band are selected to perform as part of the Australian Army Band that represents the country in foreign visits and international tattoos. The band performs during all national and historically significant holidays such as ANZAC Day and Remembrance Day. In 2005, Captain Rod Mason of the AAB-S conceived Salute to the Aussie Digger, which was designed to increase awareness on the history of the activities of the Australian Defence Force. The CD includes musical accompaniment by the AAB-S.

== See also ==
- The Lancer Band
- Royal Australian Navy Band
- Australian Army Band Kapooka
