= Champion Shots Medal =

Australian military award

- Obverse of medal and ribbon
- Type: Medal
- Awarded for: annual winner of the three service target-shooting competitions
- Presented by: Australia
- Eligibility: members of the Australian Defence Force
- Clasps: for wins in subsequent years
- Established: 13 September 1988
- Final award: 2020 Special Honours

Highlights
- Total: 77

Order of Wear
- Next (higher): Australian Cadet Forces Service Medal
- Next (lower): Long Service Medals of Imperial Origin (until 1992); Anniversary of National Service 1951–1972 Medal

The Champion Shots Medal is a military award of Australia. In Australia the three armed forces, the Royal Australian Navy, the Australian Army and the Royal Australian Air Force, conduct annual target-shooting competitions with standard issue weapons. Three medals – one for each force – are awarded to the winners.

No more than three medals can be awarded in each calendar year. If the same person receives a further Champion Shots award it is in the form of a date bar, which is attached to the ribbon of the original award. The most clasps awarded (as of 30 June 2006) is five, to Brett G. Hartman.

== Recipients ==
Over numerous years the competition shoot was not held, this is indicated by (None).

Year	Navy	Unit	Army	Unit	Air Force	Unit	Ref
1988	Chief Petty Officer William Sheather	HMAS Nirimba	Warrant Officer Class One Albert Bowden	District Support Unit, Sydney	Sergeant Brett Hartman	Air Movements Coordination Centre	
1989	Chief Petty Officer William Sheather	HMAS Nirimba	Craftsman Francis Taylor	12th/16th Hunter River Lancers	Sergeant Brett Hartman	RAAF Base Richmond	
1990	Warrant Officer Colin Dowd	HMAS Cerberus	Craftsman Francis Taylor	12th/16th Hunter River Lancers	Sergeant Brett Hartman	RAAF Base Richmond	
1991	Lieutenant Commander Peter Kelly	HMAS Lonsdale	Warrant Officer Class Two Phillip Oakford	3 Pay Unit	Sergeant Philip MacPherson	No. 3 Aircraft Depot	
1992	Leading Seaman Peter Male	HMAS Watson	Lieutenant Stuart Boyd-Law	25th Battalion, Royal Queensland Regiment	Sergeant Philip MacPherson	No. 501 Wing	
1993	Leading Seaman Warren Bowring	HMAS Cerberus	Lieutenant Stuart Boyd-Law	25th Battalion, Royal Queensland Regiment	Sergeant Philip MacPherson	No. 501 Wing	
1994	Lieutenant Commander Peter Kelly	Russell Offices	Sergeant Rodney Platt	3rd Battalion, Royal Australian Regiment	Sergeant Brett Hartman	RAAF Base Williams	
1995	Chief Petty Officer Willmore	HMAS Cerberus	Sergeant Rodney Platt	School of Infantry	Corporal Andrew Bellot	No. 501 Wing	
1996	Petty Officer Michael Hoare	School of Infantry	Warrant Officer Class Two James Dixon	School of Infantry	Corporal Andrew Bellot	No. 501 Wing	
1997	Chief Petty Officer Michael Hoare	School of Infantry	Lieutenant Stuart Boyd-Law	Regional University Regiment of Queensland	Sergeant Andrew Bellot	No. 501 Wing	
1998	Lieutenant Commander Peter Kelly	HMAS Cerberus	Corporal Peter Richards	5th Aviation Regiment	Sergeant Andrew Bellot	No. 501 Wing	
1999	Petty Officer Peter Edwards	HMAS Cerberus	Sergeant Lance William Nayda	31st Battalion, Royal Queensland Regiment	Sergeant David Gay	RAAF Base East Sale	
2000	Leading Seaman Graeme Morgan	HMAS Harman	Corporal Andrew Munn	2nd Battalion, Royal Australian Regiment	Flight Sergeant Brett Hartman	Tactical Fighter Logistics Management Squadron	
2001	None		Sergeant Mark Blake	2nd Battalion, Royal Australian Regiment	None		
2002	None		Sergeant Andrew Munn	2nd Battalion, Royal Australian Regiment	None		
2003	None		Sergeant Paul Davey	School of Infantry	Flight Sergeant David Gay	No. 114 Mobile Control and Reporting Unit	
2004	Petty Officer Michael Blake	HMAS Cerberus	Warrant Officer Class Two Peter Richards	1st Aviation Regiment	Flight Lieutenant Newton Armstrong	RAAF Base Williams	
2005	Leading Seaman Josh Kelly	816 Squadron	Sergeant Andrew Munn	Land Warfare Centre - South Queensland	None		
2006	Leading Seaman Josh Kelly	Training Authority - Navy Aviation	None		None		
2007	Leading Seaman Josh Kelly	Training Authority - Navy Aviation	Captain Aleks Strikis	2nd Division	None		
2008	None		Craftsman Jaden Hopfner	816 Squadron	None		
2009	Leading Seaman A. Wheeler	HMAS Albatross	Warrant Officer Class Two Andrew Munn	51st Battalion, Far North Queensland Regiment	None		
2010	Petty Officer Peter Edwards	HMAS Cerberus	Warrant Officer Class Two Peter Richards	9th Force Support Battalion	None		
2011	None		Major K. Stone	Combined Arms Training Centre	None		
2012	None		Private R. Ferguson	1st/19th Battalion, Royal New South Wales Regiment	None		
2013	Able Seaman C. Benton	HMAS Darwin	Warrant Officer Class One Andrew Munn	Combined Arms Training Centre	Leading Aircraftsman Dean Thurtell	No. 23 Squadron	
2014	Petty Officer G. Orr	Royal Australian Navy Band, Sydney	Warrant Officer Class Two Peter Richards	6th Engineer Support Regiment	Corporal Lewis Putinja	5th Aviation Regiment	
2015	None		Corporal A. Woolston	10/27th Battalion, Royal South Australia Regiment	Officer Cadet L. Moran	No. 2 Flying Training School	
2016	Leading Seaman Chris Moran	HMAS Waterhen	Private J. Mollison	5th/6th Battalion, Royal Victoria Regiment	Leading Aircraftsman N. Raddie	RAAF Base Amberley	
2017	Petty Officer M. Day	Royal Australian Navy Band, Sydney	Bombardier N. Latham	Army Recruit Training Centre	Leading Aircraftsman N. Raddie	RAAF Base Amberley	
2018	Able Seaman T. Brooke	Royal Australian Navy Band, Sydney	Private K. Bradburn	2nd Battalion, Royal Australian Regiment	Flying Officer L. Moran	No. 33 Squadron	
2019	Sub Lieutenant Jerome Dillon-Baker	HMAS Albatross	Lance Corporal S. Clark	1st Battalion, Royal Australian Regiment	Flying Officer L. Moran	No. 33 Squadron	
2020	Sub Lieutenant Jerome Dillon-Baker	HMAS Albatross	Lance Corporal Nicholas Latham	3rd Battalion, Royal Australian Regiment	Flight Lieutenant Rowan McBride	Officers' Training School	
2021	None		None		None		
2022	None		None		None		
2023	None		None		None		

== Description ==
- The medal is a circular antiqued brass medal 38 mm in diameter. It is ensigned with the Crown of St Edward, also in antiqued brass. Two wreaths of laurel leaves surround a symbol of two crossed rifles superimposed on the stars of the Southern Cross.
- There is no design on the back of the medal.
- The medal is suspended from a 32 mm wide ribbon. The ribbon has a central dark blue vertical band flanked by two vertical bands of red, which are in turn bordered by two vertical bands of light blue.
- A clasp inscribed with the year awarded is attached to the ribbon.

== See also ==
- Australian Honours Order of Precedence
