= Australian Army Band Newcastle =

Military band

The Australian Army Band Newcastle (AAB-N) is a reserve military band of the Australian Army. It is a sub-unit of the Australian Army Band Corps and is based at Bullecourt Barracks in Adamstown, New South Wales. It is serves as the army band for the Hunter Region. The band provides ceremonial musical support to national, state, and vice-regal events.

It was founded in 1861 as the Band of the Newcastle Volunteer Rifles. It has had consistent service with the exception of a short time following the Second World War. The Royal Australian Corps of Transport Pipes and Drums were established in 1952 as the 15th Northern Rivers Lancers. The two bands often perform together at many public events.

== See also ==
- Australian Army Band Sydney
- Australian Army Band Kapooka
