= Australian Army Band Kapooka =

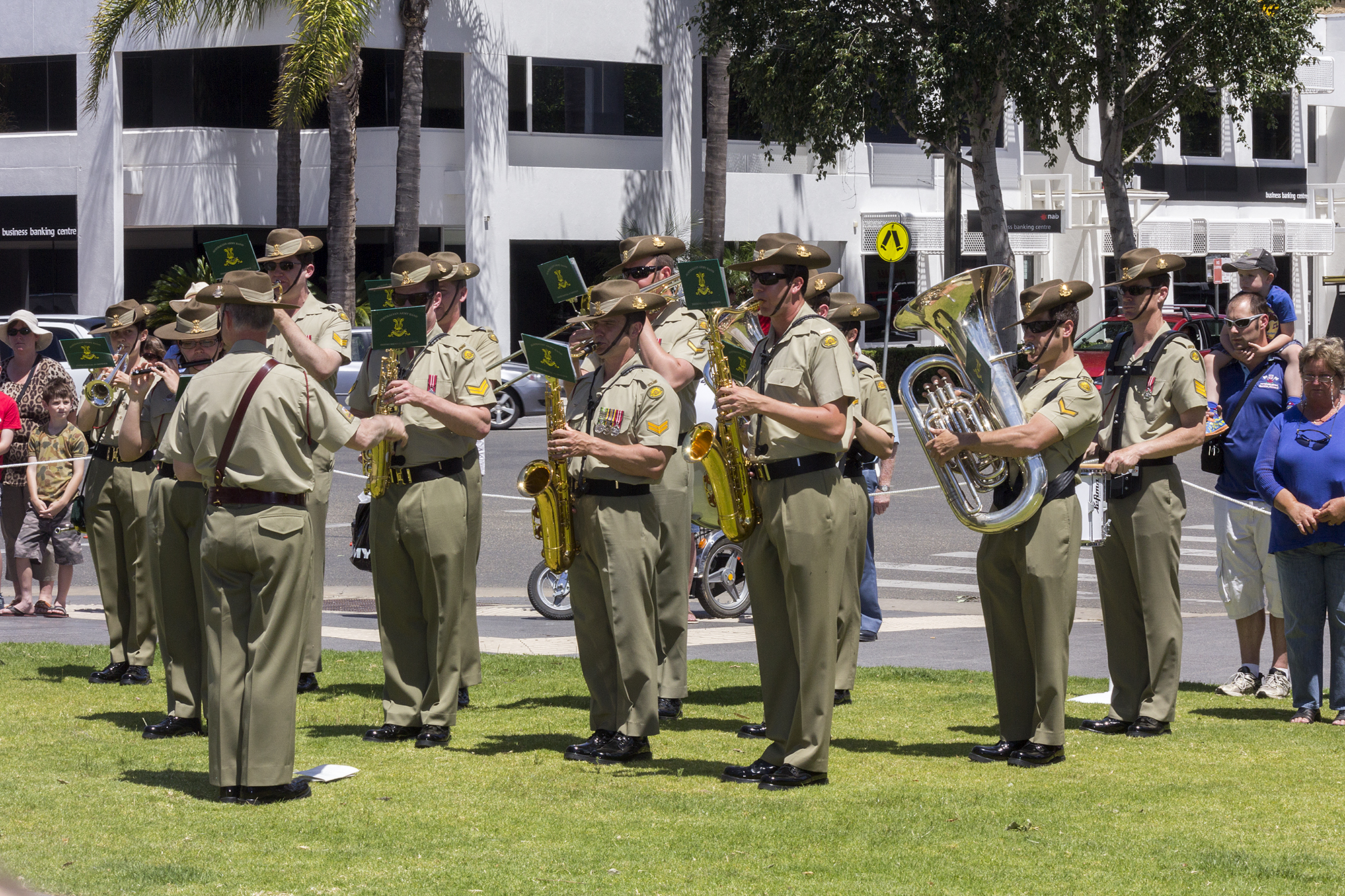
- AAB-K at a Kangaroo March centenary commemoration ceremony
- Active: 1952; 74 years ago
- Country: Australia
- Branch: Australian Army
- Size: 22 members
- Part of: Army Recruit Training Centre
- Garrison/HQ: Kapooka

Commanders
- Commanding Officer/Music Director: Major Lindsay Mee
- Notable commanders: Major Peter Thomas; Captain Darren Cole; Russell Paynter

The Australian Army Band Kapooka (AAB-K) is a full time military band in the Australian Army. Being a band, it is a sub-unit of the Australian Army Band Corps, the army's official music branch. It is one of eleven military bands of the army and as the official band of the 1st Recruit Training battalion (1RTB). It performs regularly in its area of operations including Kapooka, Riverina, and Wagga Wagga. The current director of music is Major Michael De Jonge.

In 1952, the Army Recruit Training Centre began to be been served by a full-time military brass band with a composition of 12 members. It would later be known as the Royal Australian Engineers Band, the Royal Australian Corps of Signals Band and the 1st Recruit Training Battalion Band before being given its current name.

== Role ==
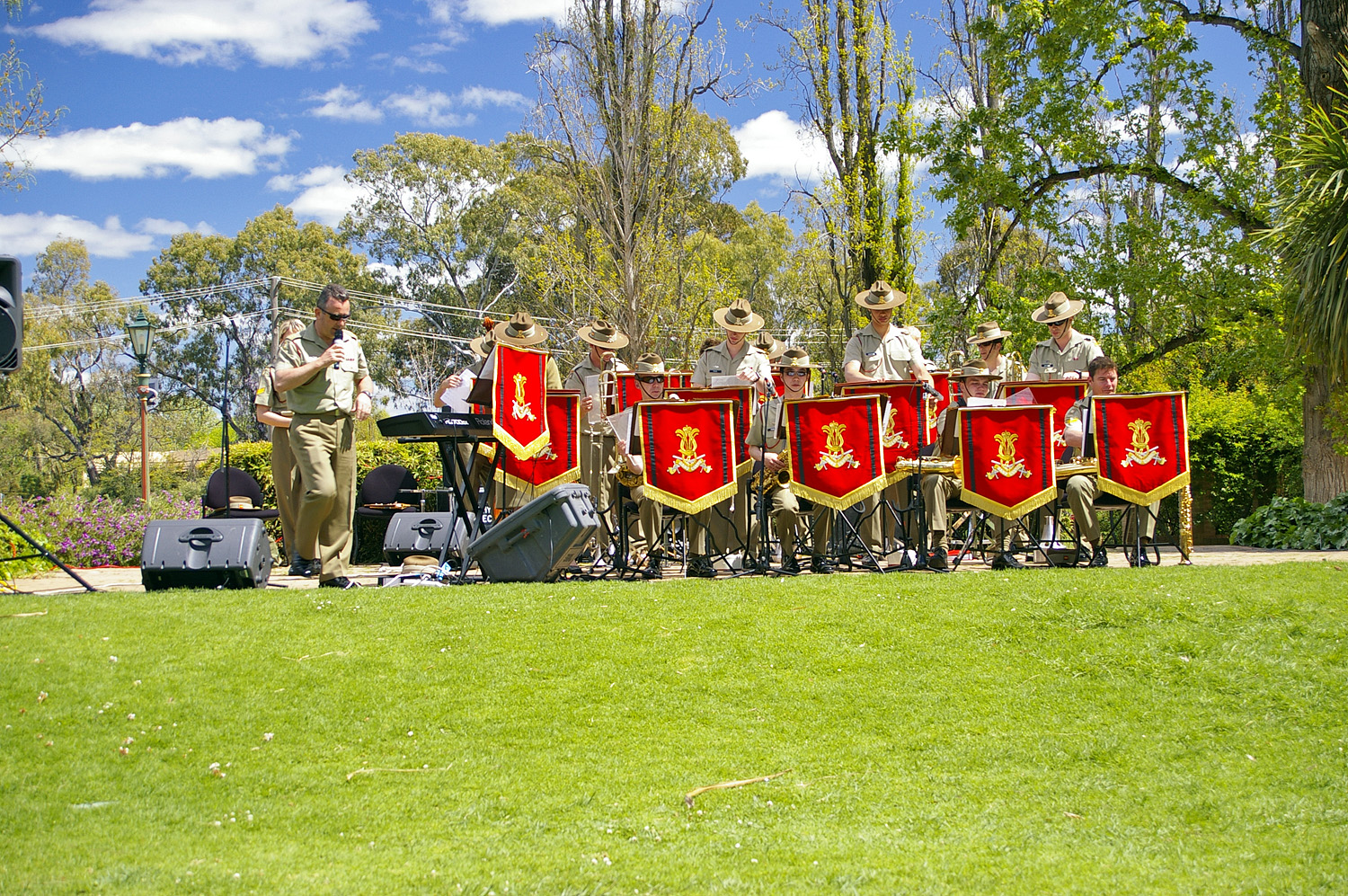
Australian Army Band Kapooka performing at a World Mental Health Day event in the Victory Memorial Gardens, October 2008.

The unit has 22 musicians in its ranks who serve in various capacities in the brass and/or woodwind sections. Being primarily a marching band, the AAB-K also boasts a stage band, a rock band, and a jazz ensemble. The AAB-K's primary role is to support the ARTC and, therefore, support all recruit activities within the Kapooka Military Area.

=== Events ===
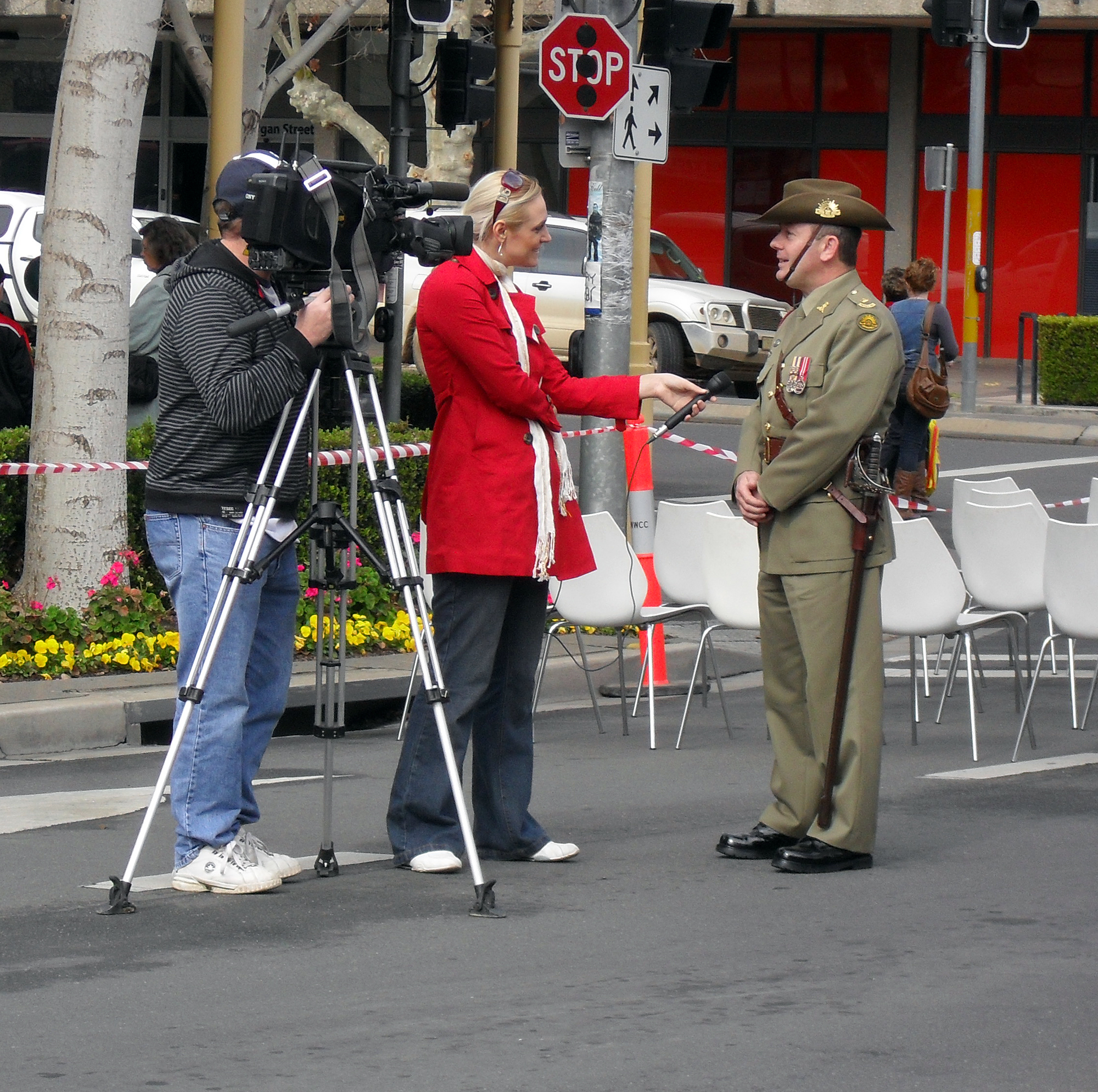
WIN Television reporter Erin Willing (left) interviewing Major Jeff Cocks of the AAB-K at the Freedom of the City for the unit in August 2009.

The band performs on national and historically significant holidays in the state of New South Wales, including Remembrance Day and ANZAC Day. In 2009, the AAB-K was granted the privilege of the Freedom of the City to Wagga Wagga to commemorate its 56 years of service.

The band has also represented Australia overseas during world tours and military deployments, really beginning with a visit to Papua New Guinea in 1990 as well as East Timor in 2000 and 2001. As per military festivals, the band had the privilege to perform at the Basel Tattoo in Switzerland on one occasion and the honor of performing in Tonga as part of a combined International band for the birthday celebrations of the king. In August 2019 AAB-K premiered an original show Around the World in 80 minutes at the Dubbo Regional Theatre and Convention Centre. The show saw band members performing songs from around the world and vocalists singing songs in English as well as foreign languages.

=== Discography ===
The band bas released the following CD's:

- Un po' di tutto (1996)
- Stand Easy (2002)
- A Celebration (2001)

== See also ==
- The Lancer Band
- Royal Australian Navy Band
- Royal Australian Air Force Band
