= Victoria Barracks, Sydney =

Army base in New South Wales, Australia

Victoria Barracks
- Paddington, Sydney, Australia
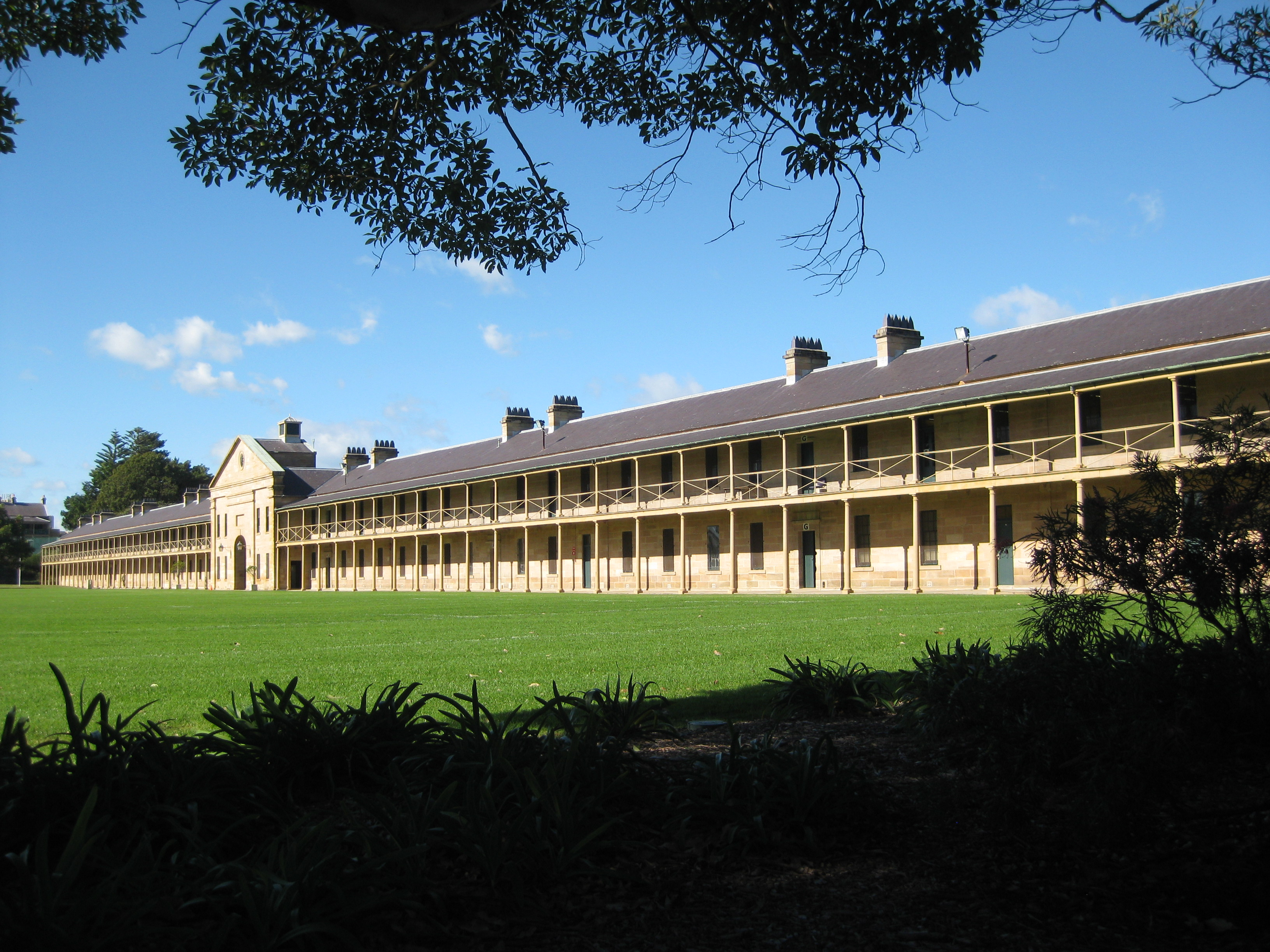
- The main barracks block

Site information
- Type: Barracks
- Owner: Department of Defence
- Controlled by: Australian Army
- Open to the public: Yes

Location
- Location in Greater Sydney
- Location within inner Sydney
- Coordinates: 33°53′09″S 151°13′23″E

Site history
- Built: 1841–1848
- In use: 1848–present
- Materials: Hawkesbury sandstone

Garrison information
- Garrison: Headquarters Forces Command
- Occupants: Australian Army Band, Sydney

Commonwealth Heritage List
- Official name: Victoria Barracks Precinct, Oxford St, Paddington, NSW, Australia
- Designated: 2 June 2004
- Reference no.: 105277

Victoria Barracks is an Australian Army base in the suburb of Paddington in Sydney, New South Wales, Australia. Victoria Barracks houses the Headquarters Forces Command and is located between Oxford Street and Moore Park Road, immediately north of Moore Park fields and sports stadiums precinct.

The Barracks is situated on land within the 'Sydney Common' proclaimed by Governor Lachlan Macquarie in 1811 "in trust for the benefit of the present and all succeeding inhabitants of Sydney". The Barracks also included to the south further parts of the Common for use by the British garrison as a cricket field and a rifle range. These were later returned to NSW colonial government public space and are the sites for the Sydney Cricket Ground and Sydney Football Stadium respectively.

Listed on the Commonwealth Heritage List in 2004, the Barracks site contains one of the most important groups of Georgian military buildings in Australia.

The Army Museum of NSW is housed in the original District Military Prison, constructed in 1847. It is open to visitors on Thursday from 10:00 a.m. to 12:30 p.m. and the first Sunday each month (by appointment) from 10:00 a.m. until 3:30 p.m. The museum is closed during December and January. Tours of the Barracks precinct are conducted by the Corps of Guides on Thursdays starting at 10:00 a.m.

The Australian Army Band Sydney is located at Victoria Barracks.

== History ==
The Victoria Barracks (the Barracks) were constructed to provide a new location for the British garrison to move them out of their current Barracks Square base in the centre of Sydney (later named Wynyard Square).

The Paddington Hill location for the Barracks was chosen as it was on a ridge with defensive views of Sydney Harbour and Botany Bay.The site was open land within the bounds of the 1,000 acres 'Sydney Common' (later Moore Park) proclaimed by Governor Lachlan Macquarie in 1811. In 1841 the Board of Ordnance in London took possession of this part of the Common for the proposed Barracks use. Per the founding of the Commonwealth in 1901 control of the Barracks site transferred from the NSW colonial government to the new federal Department of Defence.

Initially the construction site in the early 1840s was informally known as the South Head Road Barracks or the Paddington Hill Barracks. By 1844 they were, in honour of reigning Queen Victoria, referred to as the Royal Victoria Barracks and then Victoria Barracks.

The Regency style main barracks building was constructed of Hawkesbury sandstone between 1841 and 1846. The first building completed was the Officers' Quarters which was completed in 1842. The ground and foundations for the new buildings were carried out by convict labour housed on site at the Victoria Barracks Stockade. All of the above ground building work was performed by contract masons, pavers and carpenters.

The Main Barrack Block was completed in 1846 and was designed to accommodate 650 soldiers. The bell and clock were added to the building in 1856.

The British troops vacated the barracks in 1870 when they left the colony. The barracks then housed the NSW Artillery as Australia's first permanent military force. In early 1885 the Barracks housed the Sudan-bound the NSW Contingent, who marched from there to Circular Quay wharves in front of vast crowds.

The Barracks was the premier military training site in Australia for many years, from its completion until after Federation in 1901.

The bungalow was built in 1847 as the Barrack Master's Residence. The Garrison Hospital was built in 1845 to accommodate 36 patients, and during the 1930s, it was converted into an Officers' Mess.

The gate on Oxford Street is referred to as the Queen Victoria Gate, while the gate on Moore Park road is known as the Convict Gate. Busby's Bore, was Sydney's second water supply, built by convicts between 1827 and 1837. An access shaft is located at the museum.

Troop detachments also left from the Barracks to serve in the Boer War and World War 1. For a brief period during the 1930s Victoria Barracks was home to the Royal Military College, Duntroon, when the college was forced to close its buildings in Canberra and relocate to Sydney due to the economic downturn caused by the Great Depression.

== Rifle range and cricket field ==
Following the establishment of the Barracks, parts of the adjacent Sydney Common public land were progressively acquired to support military activities, including the construction of an associated rifle range and a cricket ground for the garrison. These portions of land were ultimately returned to public use and transitioned into major civic sporting precincts. The former military cricket ground and rifle range areas evolved into what became the Sydney Cricket Ground (SCG) and the Sydney Sports Ground (the site of the modern Sydney Football Stadium) respectively.

== Proposed redevelopment ==
In February 2026 the Federal Minister for Defence Richard Marles announced plans to sell off and divest various defence establishments across Australia including Victoria Barracks. In April 2026 a plan was released that would reconfigure the Barracks for housing, leisure, sports and cultural events. The Victoria Barracks were listed by the National Trust (NSW) in 1969 and they have advocated for the Barracks to continue in Defence ownership. A proposal by Sydney Roosters and Venues NSW offering to upgrade and maintain the Victoria Barracks parade ground at no cost to Defence while providing community access was rejected by the Commonwealth government.

On 25 October, former prime minister John Howard headlined a rally to protest the sale. According to The Sydney Morning Herald, there were at least several hundred gathered. In attendance were Greens and a number of One Nation supporters, people with shirts defending Ben Roberts-Smith, two former Liberal prime ministers, and sitting Labor MPs.

== Rugby union and other football codes ==
The open parade ground next to the main barracks block was at various times in the early 21st century used by the Australian national rugby union team (the 'Wallabies') as a training facility. In 1868 this field hosted one of the earliest club football games ever played in Sydney with a match between Sydney FC (Australian rules football) and soldiers of the 50th (Queen’s Own) Regiment.In 1885, a rugby team selected from the Sudan-bound the NSW Contingent played the Redfern Football Club (South Sydney district) at the Barracks. Over the 1880s-90s soldiers based at the Barracks formed the Permanent Artillery FC which hosted games and competed at various levels in Sydney club rugby union, and in 1889 played an international fixture against the New Zealand Natives tourists.In 2026 the Australian Army Rugby League team and Glebe 'Dirty Reds' met in a rugby league game at the Barracks.

== Gallery ==
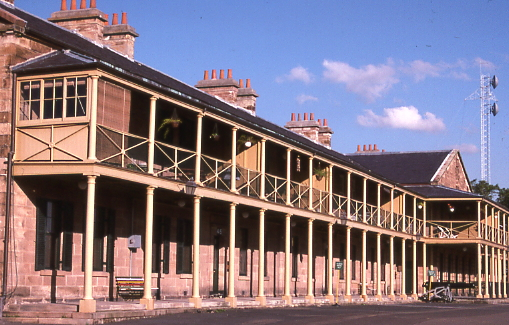
Original Officers' Quarters, Victoria Barracks

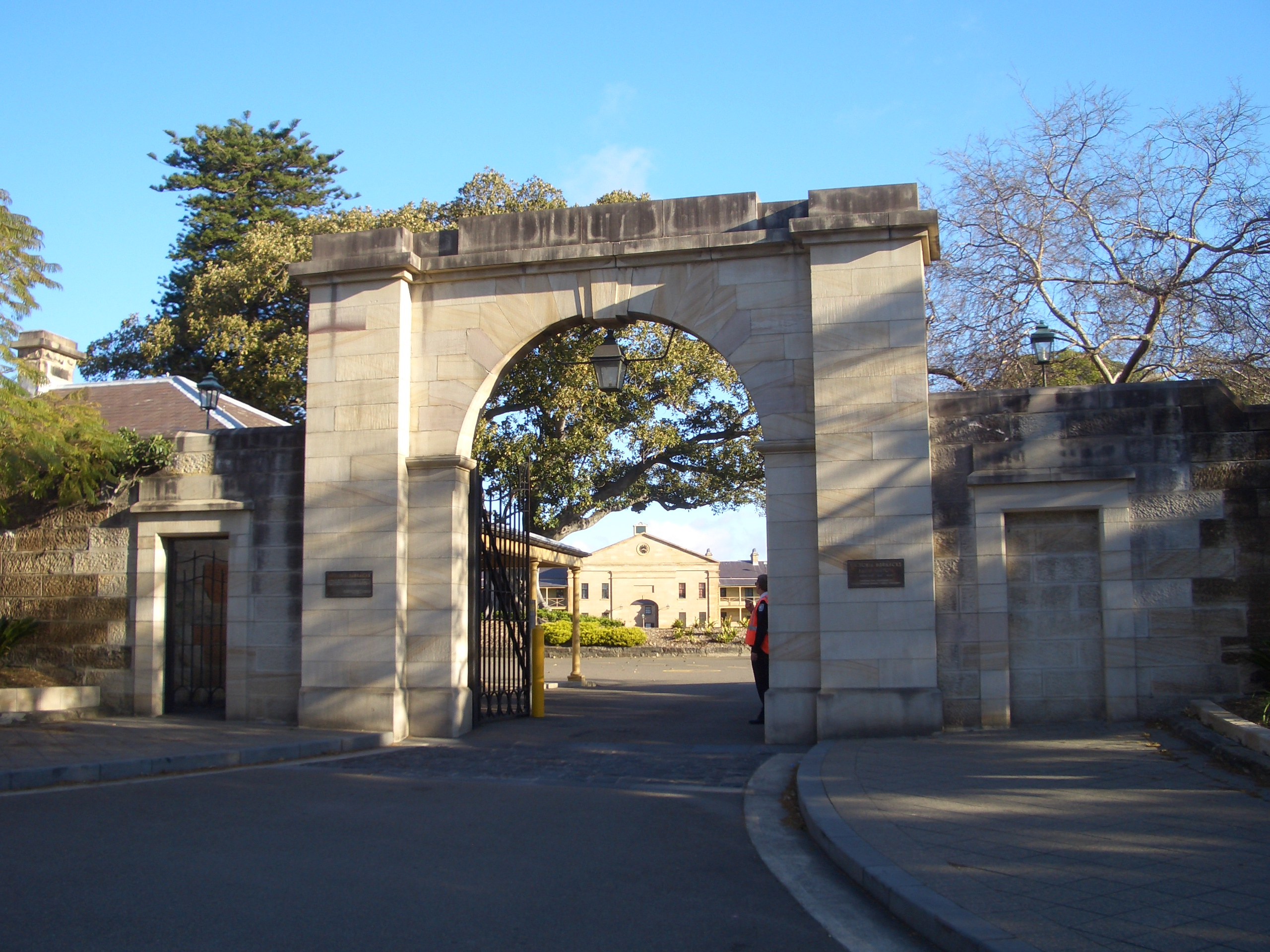
The guard house on Oxford Street, Paddington

== See also ==
- Commonwealth Heritage List
- Military history of Australia
