= Band of the Royal Military College, Duntroon =

Band of the Australian Army

The Band of the Royal Military College is a band of the Australian Army that is located in Canberra, Australian Capital Territory. It is one of 11 bands that make up the Australian Army Band Corps. Also known as the Duntroon Military Band or the RMC Band, it is the chief musical ensemble of the Royal Military College, Duntroon. It is regarded as one of the premier bands in the AABC today. The band has been under the direction of Major Douglas Hall.

== History ==
The Band of the Royal Military College was founded in 1916, as a part-time band composed from volunteers drawn from the riding staff. It was only in 1954 that they were officially established, when a band formed from members of the Regular Army was established at the college. In 1968 it became part of the Australian Army Band Corps. In the 1980s, the band began performing shows for local charities, known as the "Strike up the Band" shows, a tradition that continues to this day under the name "Music at Midday", which happens six times a year. Since 2010, the band has been one of the aspects of the RMC dedicated on the memorial plaque at the ACT Honour Walk.

== Ceremonies and activities ==
The Band of the Royal Military College is a 43-piece band that serves primarily as a symphonic wind ensemble and a marching band. It supports all activities sponsored by the Monarchy of Australia, the Governor General, the federal government and the Australian Defence Force. Being located in the ACT, it takes responsibility for community events in this area as well as supporting units such as the Australia's Federation Guard in their ceremonial duties. Events in the capital in which the band has taken part include the Canberra International Music Festival and the Canberra Symphony Orchestra series. It has participated in overseas engagements in countries like Switzerland, Turkey, Tonga, and Japan.

It also primarily serves as the sole unit band of RMC Duntroon. Thus, it participates in the ceremonies and parades conducted at the college. One of the more notable of its foreign performances was in 2000, when it accompanied a detachment of the Australian Federation Guard to London where, as part of the centenary celebrations of the Federation of Australia, the AFG mounted the Queen's Guard at Buckingham Palace, with the RMC Band provided the music as the de facto Guards Band. Recently the band has supported Australian troops serving overseas. The band is also present at graduation ceremonies and was essential to the RMC's Presentation of Colours ceremony by Queen Elizabeth II.

== Ensembles ==
The ensembles in the band include the following:

- Concert Band
- Marching Band
- Stage Band
- Woodwind Quintet
- Brass Quintet
- Jazz Ensemble
- Rock Band
- Saxophone Quartet
- Clarinet Quartet
- Woodwind Trio

== Albums ==
The band has released the following albums:

- The Big Band Sound (1976)
- Graduation '80 (1980)
- Slam (1995)
- Soldiers of the Queen (music of the Boer War)

== See also ==
- Defence Force School of Music (Australia)
- Royal Military College of Canada Bands
- West Point Band
- Band of the Royal Air Force College
