= 2019 Special Honours (Australia) =

The Special Honours Lists for Australia are announced by the Sovereign and Governor-General at any time.

Some honours are awarded by other countries where Queen Elizabeth II is the Head of State and Australians receiving those honours are listed here with the relevant reference.

== Order of Australia ==
Ribbon bar of the Order of Australia (General)

Ribbon bar of the Order of Australia (Military)

=== Companion (AC) ===
Honorary

- His Excellency Mark Rutte – 9 October 2019 – For eminent service to Australia's bilateral relationship with the Netherlands and his outstanding leadership in response to the MH17 air disaster.

=== Officer (AO) ===
Honorary
General Division

- Margaret Humphreys, CBE, OAM – 10 April 2019 – For distinguished service to the community, particularly to former child migrants.

Military Division

- Admiral Christophe Prazuck – 8 October 2019 – For distinguished service to developing the defence relationship between Australia and France through commitment, leadership and strategic foresight as Chief of Staff of the French Navy.

=== Member (AM) ===
Honorary
Military Division

- Vice Admiral Bernard-Antoine Morio De L’Isle - 20 November 2019 - For exceptional service to strengthening the defence relationship between Australia and France through his personal commitment, engagement and support to Australia and the near region in successive seniorleadership positions.

=== Medal (OAM) ===
Honorary

- William Eric Nance – 29 July 2019 – For achievement as the first Australian to sail solo around the world during the period of September 1962 to February 1965.

== Royal Victorian Order ==
Ribbon bar of the Royal Victorian Order

=== Commander (CVO) ===
- General The Hon. Sir Peter Cosgrove, AK, MC – 12 August 2019

=== Lieutenant (LVO) ===
- Sharon Lee Prendergast, Director, Australian Honours and Awards Secretariat, Government House, Canberra. – 8 June 2019

== New Zealand Order of Merit ==
Ribbon bar of the New Zealand Order of Merit

=== Companion of the New Zealand Order of Merit (CNZM) ===
- Scott Ronald Glyndwr Dixon, MNZM - For services to motorsport. Awarded as part of the 2019 Birthday Honours (New Zealand).

== Distinguished Service Cross ==
Ribbon bar of the Distinguished Service Cross

- Captain John Duckett White – 17 July 2019 – For distinguished command and leadership in warlike operations at Ngok Tavak, Vietnam on 10 May 1968.

== Medal for Gallantry ==
Ribbon bar of the Medal for Gallantry

- Corporal James Hubert Armstrong – 31 May 2019 – For acts of gallantry in action in hazardous circumstances as a machine gunner with D Company, 2/40 Battalion in Timor on 21 February 1942.
- Signalman Robert Henry Frazer – 31 May 2019 – For acts of gallantry in action in hazardous circumstances as a motor cycle dispatch rider with Sparrow Force Headquarters in support of 2/40 Battalion in Timor on 21 February 1942.
- Lieutenant Commander Michael Anthony Perrott, RAN – 17 July 2019 – For acts of gallantry in action in hazardous circumstances as the aircraft captain commanding the rescue of a downed helicopter crew in the vicinity of Vinh Long, South Vietnam on 2 February 1969.

== Distinguished Service Medal ==
Ribbon bar of the Distinguished Service Medal

- Lieutenant Colonel Norman Peterson Maddern – 31 May 2019 – For distinguished leadership in warlike operations as the Acting Company Commander of the Reinforcement Company in the 2/40 Battalion in Timor on 22 February 1942.
- Lieutenant Ronald George Williams – 31 May 2019 – For distinguished leadership in warlike operations as the Platoon Commander of 16 Platoon in the 2/40 Battalion in Timor on 27 February 1942.

== Conspicuous Service Medal ==
Ribbon bar of the Conspicuous Service Medal

- Warrant Officer Peter Ian Johnson – 31 May 2019 – For outstanding achievement as a helicopter crewman at Number 5 Squadron, Royal Australian Air Force.

== Commendation for Gallantry ==
Ribbon bar of the Commendation for Gallantry

- Private Phillip Mowbray Bessell – 5 February 2019 – For acts of gallantry in action following capture by the Imperial Japanese Army in March 1942 until his execution as a result of an escape attempt in about April 1942.
- Private John Edward Durkin – 5 February 2019 – For acts of gallantry in action following capture by the Imperial Japanese Army in early March 1942 until his execution as a result of an escape attempt on 14 August 1945.
- Private James Frederick Elmore – 5 February 2019 – For acts of gallantry in action following capture by the Imperial Japanese Army until his death on 22 May 1945, as a result of an escape attempt in March 1945.
- Lieutenant Wilkins Fitzallen – 5 February 2019 – For acts of gallantry in action while held in captivity, during his escape and subsequent recapture by the Imperial Japanese Army on Dutch Timor during the period 23 February 1942 until his execution on, or before, 23 October 1942.
- Private Arthur Edward Ford – 5 February 2019 – For acts of gallantry in action following capture by the Imperial Japanese Army on 15 February 1942 until his execution as a result of an escape attempt on 17 March 1942.
- Private Jack Victor Jones – 5 February 2019 – For acts of gallantry in action following capture by the Imperial Japanese Army in March 1942, until his execution as a result of an escape attempt in about April 1942.
- Private Norman Heather McArtney – 5 February 2019 – For acts of gallantry in action following capture by the Imperial Japanese Army on 15 February 1942, until his execution as a result of as escape attempt on 12 July 1943.
- Sergeant Howard Thomas Manning – 5 February 2019 – For acts of gallantry in action following capture by the Imperial Japanese Army in March 1942 until his execution as a result of an escape attempt in about April 1942.
- Private Sidney Arthur Webber – 5 February 2019 – For acts of gallantry in action following capture by the Imperial Japanese Army on 15 February 1942 until his death as a result of escaping on 18 June 1945.
- Sergeant Bertram John West – 5 February 2019 – For acts of gallantry in action while held in captivity, during his escape and subsequent recapture by the Imperial Japanese Army on Dutch Timor during the period 23 February 1942 until his execution on, or before, 23 October 1942.
- Sergeant Henry Whitton – 5 February 2019 – For acts of gallantry in action following capture by the Imperial Japanese Army in March 1942 until his execution as a result of an escape attempt in about April 1942.
- Squadron Leader Daryl Maxwell Sproule, DFC – 5 February 2019 – For acts of gallantry in action following his capture by the Imperial Japanese Navy until his execution as a result of an escape attempt around the middle of August 1943.
- Corporal Stephen Geoffrey Bloomfield – 31 May 2019 – For acts of gallantry in action as a Special Air Service Regiment medical assistant left alone for three days in enemy territory to tend to a severely wounded fellow soldier who had been gored by an elephant in Kalimantan during the Indonesian-Malaysian Confrontation in June 1965.

== Champion Shots Medal ==
Ribbon bar of the Champion Shots Medal

- Sub Lieutenant Jerome Joseph James Dillon-Baker
- Lance Corporal Scott Robert Clark

=== Bar ===
- Flight Lieutenant Luke Robin Moran

== Order of St John ==
Order of St John ribbon

=== Knight of the Order of St John ===
- The Hon. Kim Beazley, AC – 12 February 2019

== Honorary military appointments ==
- The Hon. Margaret Beazley, AO, QC - 25 September 2019 - Honorary Commodore, Royal Australian Navy.
