= Defence Force School of Music (Australia) =

Music school of the Australian Defence Force

The Defence Force School of Music (DFSM) trains all musicians for the Australian Defence Force. It is located at Simpson Barracks in Yallambie, Victoria, Australia. The DFSM was established in 1984 and provides training courses to musicians wishing to join the Royal Australian Navy Band, the Australian Army Band Corps, the Royal Australian Air Force Band, as well as other Australian military bands, in order to qualify them for employment and leadership in these bands. It also offers training to musicians from overseas militaries and Australian emergency services/police organisations. It was previously the divided into the Australian Army School of Music (which was itself part of the Army Apprentices' School) and the Royal Australian Navy School of Music.

Within the DFSM are several training sections:

- Piping Section
- Military Band Section
- Vocal Ensemble
- Fanfare Team
- Woodwind and Brass Quintet
- Big Band
- Other specifications

The level of competence required to be admitted into the DFSM is a Grade 7 by the Australian Music Examinations Board.

== Notable personalities ==
- Lieutenant Colonel Patrick Pickett – Commandant of the Defence Force School of Music and later director of music of the AABC.
- Graham Lloyd – Chief Instructor at the Defence Force School of Music beginning in February 2004. He was also an instructor at the Army School of Music in 1976, 1977 and 1987.

== See also ==
- Australian Army Band Corps
- Canadian Forces School of Music
- Royal Military School of Music
- Irish Defence Forces School of Music
