= Anniversary of National Service 1951–1972 Medal =

- Obverse of medal and ribbon
- Type: Medal
- Awarded for: service
- Presented by: Australia
- Eligibility: former National Servicemen
- Status: Ceased, Open to those eligible
- Established: 10 October 2001

Highlights
- Total: 127,000

Order of Wear
- Next (higher): Long Service Medals of Imperial Origin (until 1992); Champion Shots Medal
- Next (lower): Independence and Anniversary Medals (until 1992); Foreign awards

The Anniversary of National Service 1951–1972 Medal is a commemorative medal awarded to Australians for their service in post-war national service schemes.

There is no post-nominal for this medal.

== Description ==
- The Anniversary of National Service 1951–1972 Medal is a circular bronze medal ensigned with the Crown of St Edward. The obverse depicts an Australian Defence Force emblem with the crossed swords of the Army taking precedence, being the arm predominantly affected by national service. The Federation Star surmounts the emblem. The words 'Anniversary of National Service' are on the perimeter of the medal and the years 1951–1972 are on the central bottom edge.
- The reverse shows the Southern Cross overlaid on spreading rays and surrounded by a cog, a traditional symbol for the spirit of co-operation between the Australian Defence Force and the community.
- The ribbon has a central yellow stripe, flanked by two dark blue stripes, which are in turn flanked by white, green and light blue stripes and ochre edges. The central yellow and dark blue stripes represent Australia's national colours of the time, the white, green and light blue represent the Navy, Army and Air Force and the outer ochre stripes represent the soil of Australia.
