= 2020 Special Honours (Australia) =

The Special Honours Lists for Australia are announced by the Sovereign and Governor-General at any time.

Some honours are awarded by other countries where Queen Elizabeth II is the Head of State and Australians receiving those honours are listed here with the relevant reference.

This list also incorporates the Mid Winters Day honours list and the Bravery honours list's.

== Victoria Cross for Australia (VC) ==
Ribbon bar of the Victoria Cross for Australia

- The late Ordinary Seaman Edward Sheean - 12 August 2020

== Order of Australia ==
Ribbon bar of the Order of Australia (General)

Ribbon bar of the Order of Australia (Military)

=== Officer (AO) ===
Honorary Military

- Admiral Robert P. Burke, United States – 24 August 2020 – For distinguished service in strengthening the military alliance between Australia and the United States of America.

=== Member (AM) ===
Honorary General

- Professor Massimo Colomban, Italy – 28 January 2020 – For significant service to the Australian Government as Honorary Consul in Veneto, Italy.
- Count Paolo Zegna Di Monte Rubello, Italy – 28 January 2020 – For significant service to Australia's bilateral relationship with Italy and to the Australian wool industry.

=== Medal (OAM) ===
Honorary General

- Sir Christopher John Benson – United Kingdom – 28 January 2020 – For service to the bilateral relationship between Australia and the United Kingdom.
- Valerie Hooper – Belgium – 28 January 2020 – For service to the Embassy of Australia to Belgium and Luxembourg, and Australia's Mission to the European Union and NATO.

== Star of Courage (SC) ==
Ribbon bar of the Star of Courage

- Paul Robert Chaplin - For acts of conspicuous courage in circumstances of great peril
- Ruth Mawi Dhurrkay - Miss Ruth Dhurrkay displayed conspicuous courage during a violent attack on a young girl at Galiwinku in the Northern Territory on 30 October 2018.

== Bar to the Bravery Medal (BM and Bar) ==
- Stevan John Morrow - Mr Stevan Morrow displayed considerable bravery during an armed hold-up at a jewellery shop in Toorak in Victoria on 14 January 2017.

== Bravery Medal (BM) ==
Ribbon bar of the Bravery Medal

- Troy Daniel Cutler
- Natalie Jane Dearden
- Darren Charles Fyfe
- Sergeant Mark Hilton Hevers - New South Wales Police Force
- Matthew James Irving
- Timothy Brett Kelm
- Sergeant Justin McEvoy - New South Wales Police Force
- Regan Angus McMahon
- Senior Sergeant Bradyn Michael Murphy, APM - Queensland Police Service
- Anthony Gordon Northbrooke-Hine
- David Howard O'Dowd
- Kyle Anthony Patrech
- Senior Constable Ashley Cain Rawlings - Victoria Police
- Donald Allen Romey
- Levi John Symington
- John Ngahiti Waerea
- Constable Matthew John Woodham - Queensland Police Service
- Mark Timothy Bryant
- Zebulon Albert Critchlow
- Joshua Allan Downes
- Billy James Eitz
- The late Mr Callum James Hall
- Robert Hayden
- Tyler Oswald Hollmer-Cross
- Senior Constable Michael Hoogvelt
- Jonathon Athol Hyde
- William Brett Moller
- Stevan John Morrow - Mr Stevan Morrow displayed considerable bravery during an armed hold-up at a jewellery shop in Toorak in Victoria on 25 October 2016.
- Troy Steven Oakley
- Terrence Anthony Townsend

== Australian Antarctic Medal (AAM) ==
Ribbon bar of the Australian Antarctic Medal

- Simon Cross - For service to the Australian Antarctic Program in his capacity of a Field Training Officer involved in the 2013 medical evacuation and particularly in his role in rescuing three injured expeditioners.
- Bradley Allen Collins - For his outstanding contribution to the Australian Antarctic Program over thirteen seasons, particularly in the leadership role he took during the grounding of the Aurora Australis at Horseshoe Harbour, near Mawson Research Station, Antarctica.
- Alison Audrey Dean - For her outstanding service to the Australian Antarctic Program as a station leader who has provided exceptional leadership in building strong and resilient communities and leading teams through a number of high intensity operations.
- Leanne Mary Millhouse - For her outstanding service to the Australian Antarctic Program, particularly in her capacity as Voyage Leader on the Aurora Australis when the ship has been tasked to assist in crisis situations.
- The late Professor Patrick Gerard Quilty, AM - For his outstanding contribution to Antarctic science helping to establish Australia's leading reputation in the field.
- Dr Colin Jeffrey Southwell - For his outstanding contribution to the Australian Antarctic Program by providing important insights and breadth of knowledge for wildlife conservation and management.

== Commendation for Brave Conduct ==
Ribbon bar of the Commendation for Brave Conduct

- Kurt Luther Bligh
- George Chapman
- Senior Constable Christopher James Cooper - New South Wales Police Force
- Stuart William Couch
- Senior Constable Thomas Robert Dempsey - Victoria Police
- Lee James Dobson
- Senior Constable Grant Charlton Haydon - New South Wales Police Force
- Daniel Edward Kotynia
- Benjamin Terence McKenzie
- Leading Senior Constable Mark Douglas McLean - Victoria Police
- Jamie Ronald O'Connell
- Major Brendan Andrew Rowe - Australian Army
- Senior Constable Andrew Palgrave Simpson - New South Wales Police Force
- Robin Wayne Smith
- Sergeant Craig Jason Stanton - Victoria Police
- Simon Eric Werne
- Sergeant Daniel Willsmore - Victoria Police
- Ahmed Abdullah Almohaimeed
- Cody Jay Batchelor
- Senior Constable John William Dijkstra
- Glen Aaron Hardy
- David Joyce
- Joshua James Woodley

== Champion Shots Medal ==
Ribbon bar of the Champion Shots Medal

Bar to the medal

- Sub Lieutenant Jerome Joseph James Dillon-Baker, RAN

Medal

- Flight Lieutenant Rowen Mitchell McBride
- Lance Corporal Nicholas Paul Latham

== Group Bravery Citation ==
Awardees comprise members of the Country Fire Authority who are recognised for their actions after an armed offender set fire to a house and vehicles at Meadow Heights in Victoria.

- Brendan Colin Edwards
- Francisco Grech
- Roy William Griffiths
- Matthew David Kent

Awardees comprise an officer of the Queensland Police Service and a member of the public who are recognised for their actions during the rescue of a man from a burning vehicle at Gympie in Queensland.

- Constable Jeremy Gardiol - Queensland Police Service
- Alan Girdler

Awardees comprise five members of Fire and Rescue New South Wales and two Ambulance New South Wales paramedics who are recognised for their actions during the rescue of a man trapped in a trench at a building site in Castle Hill, New South Wales.

- Warren William Bostock
- Christopher Humphreys
- Anthony Gordon Northbrooke-Hine
- Terrence Andrew Sadoswky
- Deryck John Salfus
- Bradley Scott Turner
- Anthony Waller

Awardees comprise members of the Tactical Response Group of the Western Australian Police Force who are recognised for their actions during the apprehension of a violent offender near Fitzroy Crossing in Western Australia.

- Robert Harold Brown
- Dennis Eric Collision, APM
- John Robert Dent
- Barry John Lansdown
- Donald Gordon McPherson
- The late Mr William Frederick Matson, APM
- David Anthony Sheehan
- Edward William Trindall

Awardees comprise officers of the New South Wales Police Force and Queensland Police Service who are recognised for their actions during the apprehension of two armed offenders following a high-speed vehicle pursuit near Tweed Heads in New South Wales.

- Kristie Emma Bell
- Troy Daniel Cutler
- Senior Constable Brett John Burns
- Senior Constable Luke William Davies
- Senior Constable Matthew John Grinham
- Senior Constable Justin Gregory Lavin
- Senior Constable Peter Bradley Lever
- Senior Sergeant Bradyn Michael Murphy, APM
- Constable Matthew Kenneth Siddall
- Senior Constable Andrew Palgrave Simpson

Awardees comprise members of the Malabar Emergency Unit who are recognised for their actions during a prison riot at Long Bay Gaol in New South Wales.

- Wayne Francis Carmandy
- Alan Gary Clarke
- William Dodson
- Anthony Stefan D'Silva
- David Shane Farrell
- David John Gilledge
- Garry William Lockhart
- Kenneth Michael Newberry
- Domenic Pezzano
- The late Mr Mark Anthony Russo
- The late Mr Stephen John Wright

Awardees comprise members of the public who are recognised for their actions during the rescue of passengers and driver following a bus crash in Lamington National Park in Queensland.

- Steven Hamish Armitage
- Senior Sergeant Troy Anthony Hamilton, BM - Queensland Police Service
- Paul John Hughes - of the United Kingdom
- Dr Samantha Naday
- Jack William O'Dwyer
- Michael John Springfield

Awardees comprise five members of a group who rescued a man from a burning vehicle at Corowa, New South Wales.

- Phillip Adrian Dunning
- Rhys Jones
- Samuel Marshall King
- Daryl Brent Price
- Terrence Anthony Townsend

Awardees comprise two members of a group for their actions following a boat collision at Bradley's Head, New South Wales.

- Nasser Farache
- Samar Oweck
