= Royal Australian Air Force Band =

- Active: 1923; 103 years ago
- Country: Australia
- Branch: Royal Australian Air Force
- Type: Military Band
- Garrison/HQ: RAAF Base Williams, Laverton
- Nickname: Air Force Band
- Motto: "Harmony"
- Colors: Governor-General's Banner (presented in 1989)
- March: Quick - Royal Australian Air Force March Past
- Anniversaries: Air Force Birthday – 31 March; Air Force Band birthday - 20 August

Commanders
- Current commander: Squadron Leader Phillip Martin

The Royal Australian Air Force Band (abbreviated as Air Force Band within Australia) is the Royal Australian Air Force's official music branch. The current commanding officer is Squadron Leader Phillip Martin. The Director of Music is Flying Officer Michael Potts. The Air Force Band's mission is to promote and enhance the image, reputation and culture of the Air Force. The band represents Air Force at significant events in Australia and abroad.

== History ==
=== Early years ===
On 16 March 1916, the Number One Squadron of the Australian Flying Corps (AFC) sailed from Port Melbourne on board the SS Orsova (1908), arriving in Egypt in April of that year. The contingent included musically talented airmen who provided musical support during World War I. Similar entertainment troupes were formed at various AFC bases during the war, particularly The Flying Kangaroos and The Gee Whizzers from the AFC training bases at Leighterton and Minchinhampton. Soon after the creation of an independent Royal Australian Air Force, a part-time RAAF Band was formed by volunteer airmen in January 1923 at the Air Force's birthplace in Point Cook. On 20 August of that year, Hugh Niven was appointed the first Bandmaster, and this date is recognized as the beginning of music services in the Air Force. Significant amongst its early activities was its role as official band for all ceremonies and grand public military review for the opening of Parliament House in Canberra in 1927. The band moved to Laverton during World War II.

=== Mid-20th century ===
In 1932, a part-time brass band was established at RAAF Richmond. The RAAF Central Band was formed in 1952 at Laverton and the Air Command Band (originally known as the RAAF No. 1 Regional Band) was formed at RAAF Richmond in 1969, with both bands enjoying reputations for musical excellence. The former was founded under the direction of British-born bandmaster Laurence Henry Hicks, who simultaneously the inaugural Director of Music for the RAAF. In 1963, he was awarded the Order of the British Empire, "in recognition of his loyal and valuable service", with the citation "For service as Director of Music with the RAAF". The latter was formed by Flying Officer Michael Butcher (later Squadron Leader Michael Butcher, OAM, LRAM, ARCM, LGSM).

=== Modern band ===
The two bands were amalgamated into one band in 2008, bringing together their traditions to provide a strong foundation for today's RAAF Band. The merger was criticized by supporters and veterans of the Richmond Band, with Roger Williams, a former trombonist in the band, petitioning for the Parliament of Australia to intervene.

== Event highlights ==
The Melbourne-based RAAF Central Band's debut activity was during the Presentation of the Queen's Colour by Queen Elizabeth II in 1952. It also provides musical support during the Royal visit to Australia in February 1954 as well as the 1956 Olympic Games in Melbourne. On 31 January 1968, Hicks was the Squadron Leader of the Central Band during a ceremony in honor of Nauru's independence. Hicks performed the music for the national anthem of Nauru which he composed himself, "Nauru Bwiema", with lyrics by Nauran writer, Margaret Hendrie. 1969 marked a tour of Southeast Asia to boost the morale of Australian troops deployed to Vietnam and Malaysia.

The next operational deployment for Air Force musicians was the Sydney-based Air Command Band deployment to East Timor in 2000. Air Command Band supported Anzac commemorative services on the Gallipoli peninsula, Turkey, in 2002, the first Air Force musical support to ongoing overseas commemorations.

Other highlights include concerts in support of the 2000 Sydney Olympics; numerous international tattoos and tournaments, ANZAC Day commemorations around Australia, in Europe and on the Gallipoli Peninsula in Turkey; and the 100th anniversary of the Armistice commemorations at the Australian National Memorial in Villers-Bretonneux, France.

Air Force Band musicians have regularly deployed to ADF areas of operations in support of Australian troops, including several tours of highly successful morale-boosting concerts for Australian Defence Force personnel and multi-national forces deployed in areas of operation, including East Timor, The Solomon Islands, Iraq and Afghanistan.

== Structure ==
=== Ceremonial Band ===
The Royal Australian Air Force Band provides a vital ceremonial role through the Ceremonial Band. The Ceremonial Band can be deployed as a marching or seated formation and comprises a Drum Major, brass and woodwind sections, a fanfare team, and a drum and bugle corps. The Ceremonial Band provides musical support for all Australian Defence Force ceremonial activities, as well as events sponsored by federal, state, and local governments. Of significant importance is the role the Ceremonial Band plays in national celebrations and in community events. Internationally, the Ceremonial Band represents the RAAF at cultural events including ANZAC Day commemorations at Gallipoli, Villers-Bretonneux. It has also attended international military tattoos in the United Kingdom, New Zealand, Tonga and South Korea.

=== Concert Band ===
The Concert Band is the main musical ensemble of the band. Its repertoire consists mostly of modern compositions for wind bands, as well as arrangements of orchestral music. The instrumentation is almost identical to the ceremonial band, although they do have very different purposes and different particularities. The concert band only performs in concert settings, seated.

=== Big Band ===
The Big Band is the band's main jazz ensemble. It consists of 20 musicians who play brass and specific woodwind instruments. The band is raised specifically on the concept of the danceable swing music and classic pop.

=== Wind Quintet ===
The Wind Quintet is part of the Ceremonial Band, composing of a small number of members who play wind instruments.

=== Brass Quintet ===
The Brass Quintet is part of the Ceremonial Band, composing of members who play brass instruments.

=== Rock group- 'AV8' ===
AV8 is a rock group, that represents Air Force at major events and festivals.

=== Air Force Band - Sydney Detachment ===
The Sydney Detachment is versatile ensemble that is popular at corporate Defence functions and community events alike.

=== Jazz Group ===
The Jazz Group provides great diversity of musical styles based on Australia's jazz culture.

=== Clarinet Quartet ===
This quartet is a specialized group of four clarinet players who perform sectional music.

=== Drum Corps ===
The drum corps is composed of percussionists from within the band. It is made up of up to four snare drummers and one bass drummer, and combines with the piccolo section for performances in the fife and drum tradition. They parade with the ceremonial band, support military funerals, provide assistance with military drill training, and individual drummers support catafalque parties and ramp ceremonies.

=== Fanfare team ===
The Fanfare team provides ceremonial support to Government and military occasions.

== Notable members ==
=== Commanding Officers and Music Directors ===
- Hugh Niven, musical director of the RAAF Band at Point Cook and later Laverton 1923 - 1952
- Ernest Thomas Joseph Keller. Band Master No. 3 Squadron Band, RAAF Base Richmond - c.1927 - 1934(?)
- Ernest John Fellows, Flight Lieutenant. Band Master RAAF Band Richmond 1934 -1955
- Lawrence Henry Hicks, OBE, LRAM, ARCM, Squadron Leader. Director of Music - Air Force, Commanding Officer RAAF Central Band 1952 - 1968
- Ronald Alexander Young Mitchell, MBE, LRAM, ARCM, Squadron Leader. Director of Music - Air Force, Commanding Officer RAAF Central Band 1968 - 1983
- Archie Burt, MBE, Flight Lieutenant - Operational Command Band 1974 - 1978
- Tom Cooper, Squadron Leader. Commanding Officer Operational Command Band/Air Command Band 1978 - 1989
- Michael Arthur Butcher, OAM, LRAM, ARCM, LGSM, Squadron Leader. Founding Officer No.1 Regional Band 1969 - 1974; Director of Music - Air Force, Commanding Officer RAAF Central Band 1984 - 1989
- Graham Lloyd, MMus (Melb), ARCM, LTCL, AMusA, Squadron Leader. Director of Music - Air Force, Commanding Officer RAAF Central Band 1989 - 2000
- David Worrall, BMus, Grad Dip Ed, FTCL, Squadron Leader. Commanding Officer Air Command Band 1989 - 2000
- Steve J. Campbell-Wright, MMus (Melb), GDipAppMus, GDipCultHeritage, Squadron Leader. Director of Music - Air Force, Commanding Officer RAAF Central Band/Air Force Band 2000 - 2011
- John Buckley, BMus (Syd), GDipAppMus, FTCL, AMusA, LMus, Squadron Leader. Commanding Officer Air Command Band 2000 - 2010
- Mathew Shelley, GDipAppMus, Grad Dip Mgt, MBA, AMusA, LTCL, CAHRI, Squadron Leader. Director of Music - Air Force, Commanding Officer Air Force Band 2012 - 2018
- Mark Pentreath, CSM, Squadron Leader. Commanding Officer Air Force Band 2018 - 2021
- Daniel Phillips, Squadron Leader. Current Commanding Officer Air Force Band

== See also ==
- The Lancer Band
- Royal Australian Navy Band
- Australian Army Band Corps
