= Army Recruit Training Centre =

Australian Army training establishment

Coordinates: 35°9′17″S 147°17′4″E

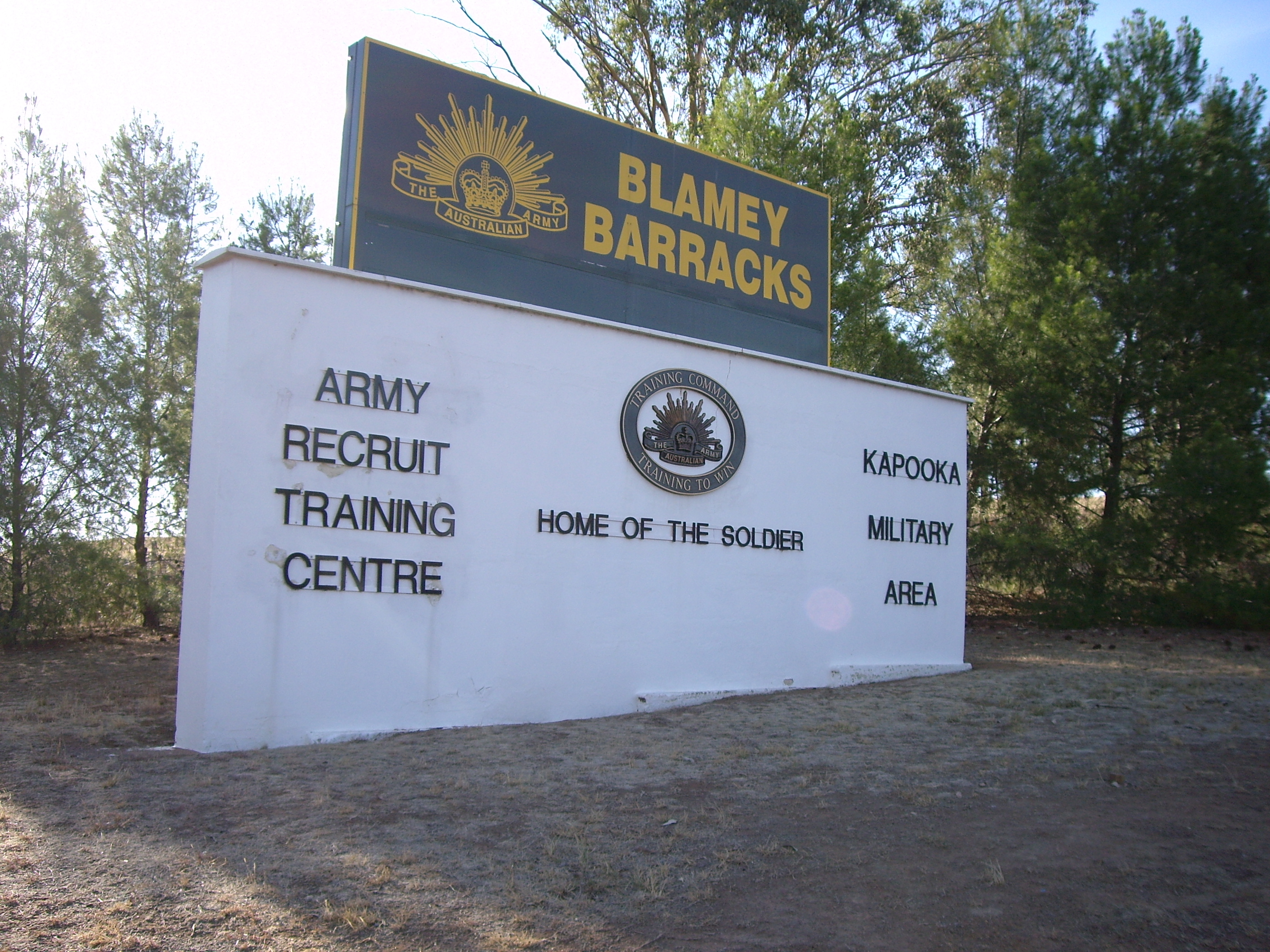
The Army Recruit Training Centre entrance sign.

Army Recruit Training Centre (ARTC) is the name of the Australian Army's basic training establishment, since December 1998. Located at Kapooka, an outer suburb of Wagga Wagga, in the Riverina region of New South Wales, the Army Recruit Training Centre (ARTC) is located within Blamey Barracks, about 9.5 km south-west of Wagga Wagga.

Blamey Barracks is named after Field Marshal Sir Thomas Blamey, an Australian general of the Second World War, who was born near Wagga Wagga. He was the first, and to date only, Australian to attain the rank of field marshal.

== History ==
The ARTC site was established on a property on the southern slopes of the Pomingalarna Reserve in 1942, as a direct result of defence needs during the Second World War. As a part of the Royal Australian Engineers Centre, thousands of engineers were trained in basic soldiering skills as well as engineering duties. In addition, 47,000 regular soldiers trained at the barracks from 1942 to 1945. The location was also the camp for members of the Australian Women's Army Service, who acted as orderlies, drivers and hospital staff during the war.

On 24 May 1945, at a little after 3 pm, 26 men were killed in an accident on the base. 24 trainees were assembling hand-held explosive devices under the supervision of training staff, when a large explosion occurred. There were only two survivors. The cause of the explosion has never been determined. The incident led to Australia's largest military funeral.

Following the Second World War, the barracks became the 1st Recruit Training Battalion (1RTB). It was established in November 1951, with Lieutenant Colonel V.E. Dowdy appointed as the first Commanding Officer. During 1952 and 1953, 1RTB was joined by the 2nd Recruit Training Battalion, in temporary buildings on the ridge south of the main camp.

Most of the current facilities were built in 1965 and 1966, and opened on 6 December 1966, by then Governor of New South Wales, Sir Roden Cutler. 1RTB conducted training for both national service and regular Army recruits. During the Vietnam War between 1965 and 1972, in excess of 10,000 National Servicemen trained at Kapooka.

In 1985, the ARTC, then called 1RTB, became responsible for the training of female recruits, who were previously trained at the WRAAC School at Georges Heights in Sydney. The centre took on the additional responsibility of training some reserve recruits from 1993.

The Army Adventurous Training Wing moved from Bonegilla, Victoria to the Blamey Barracks in 1998. In October 2006, Recruit Training Wing changed its name back to the 1st Recruit Training Battalion (1RTB).

== Change in Training Structure 2023 - Present ==
Up until December 2022 the training program involved Reserve recruits undertaking a 35-day program. The recruits who are to form part of the Australian Regular Army undertake an 80-day program. In 2023 an accelerated program was experimented with where the Other Rank (OR) Reserve Recruits course was reduced to 21 days cutting away much of the weapon handling. Officer reserves have maintained the 35-day program.

The program designed for the full-time recruits who are to join the Australian Regular Army remained at 80 days apart from Delta Company. Delta Company led an experimental 63-day course. This course maintained all teaching points whilst reducing teaching periods and removed many of the breaks found in the 80-course. The 63-day course was criticised by both staff and recruits alike with claims that it failed to provide time to decompress and put too much stress on recruits to learn content in such a short amount of time.

However the 63-day program demonstrated that soldiers could be trained and mobilised in quicker times than previously estimated which could benefit Australia in future operations. As of 2025 the reduced 63-day training program was abandoned, transitioning to a 10-week then an 11-week program. The 11-week program now incorporates a more extensive LSW package and an urban package.

== Current structure and programs ==
ARTC has two training wings. The Recruit Training Wing (RTW) provides initial recruit training for all regular and reserve recruits for the Army. The Army Adventurous Training Wing trains unit adventurous training leaders.

The training program involved Reserve recruits undertaking a 21-day program for OR recruits and 35 days for officers. The recruits who are to form part of the Australian Regular Army undertake a 63-day program. The course includes marksmanship training, physical training, navigation, drill, dress and bearing, first aid, radio communications, military customs and traditions, service discipline law, and field training.

There are 5 companies within the battalion, Alpha (1-6 Platoon), Bravo (11-16 Platoon), Charlie (21-26 Platoon), Delta (31-36 Platoon), and Echo (41-46 Platoon). A recruit will join one of the platoons within a company when they arrive at 1RTB. Occasionally, a platoon may be paired with a sister platoon or two from the same company, depending on the size of the intake. They will march in and out at the same time as the other platoons, as each platoon has a max capacity of 60 recruits.

As of mid-2021, Delta was temporarily disbanded, to comply with COVID-19 government guidelines. Every third reservist intake was isolated from the rest of the battalion and placed into Camp Blue Training Grounds, just above the rifle ranges. Currently, the battalion is led by COL Andrew Deacon, who is the youngest commander in 1RTB history, at age 38.

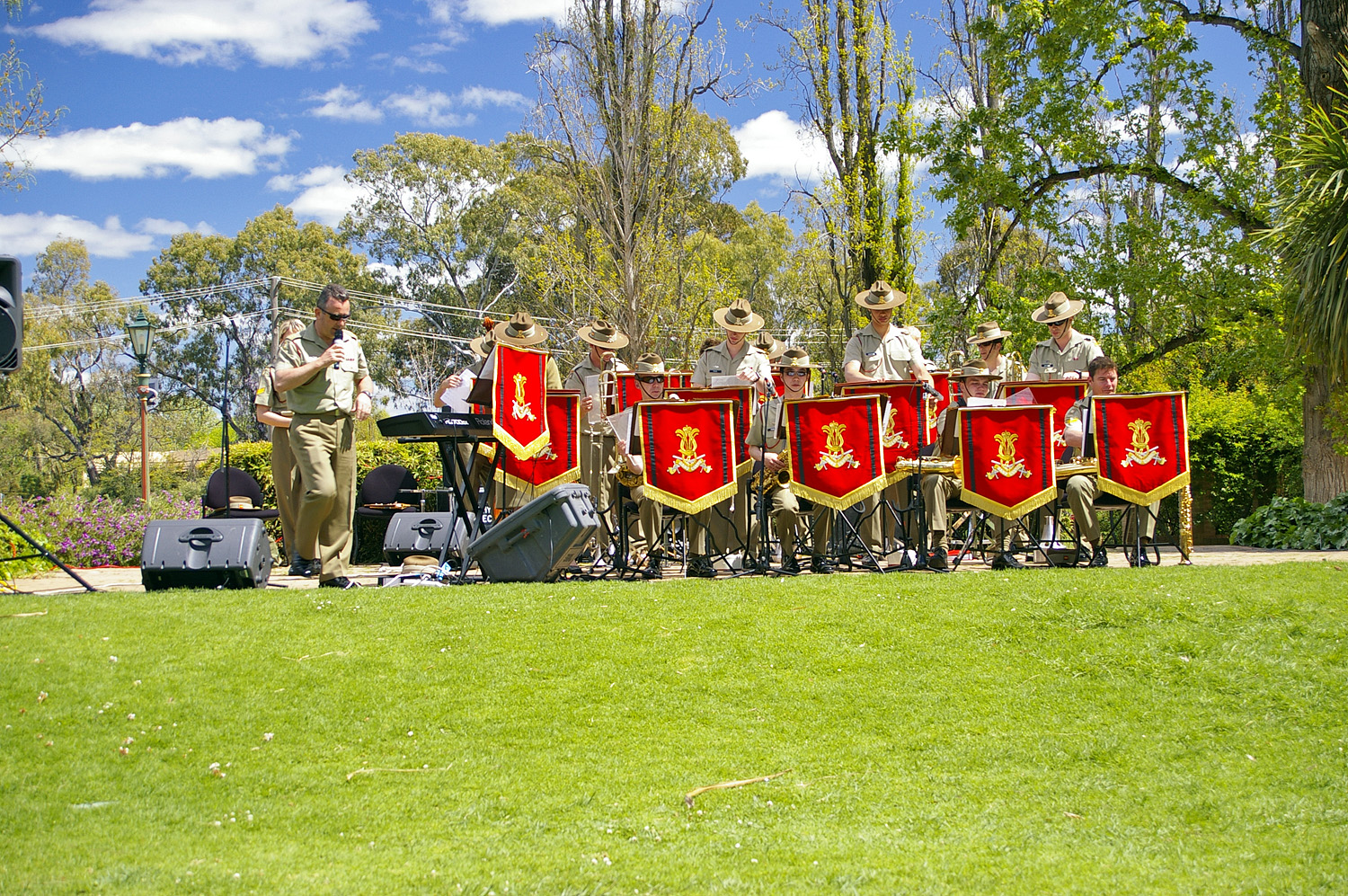
The Australian Army Band Kapooka

ARTC is also home to the Australian Army Band Kapooka, which is part of the army's Australian Army Band Corps. It provides music for military ceremonies.
