= The Lancer Band =

Australian Army band, garrisoned at Lancer Barracks in New South Wales

- Active: 1891–present
- Country: Australia
- Branch: Australian Army
- Type: Regimental band
- Part of: 1st/15th Royal New South Wales Lancers
- Garrison/HQ: Lancer Barracks, Parramatta, New South Wales, Australia

Commanders
- Commanding Officer: Lieutenant Colonel Colin Shadbolt
- Bandmaster: Sergeant Nathan Albertini

The Lancer Band is a band within the Australian Army, serving as the Regimental Band of the 1st/15th Royal New South Wales Lancers. The band is an organic formation of the regiment and is co-garrisoned at Lancer Barracks in Parramatta, Sydney, New South Wales. The Lancer Band is the oldest Australian military band still in continuous service being formed in 1891.

== Description ==
The Lancer Band is made up of Australian Army soldiers who serve as musicians as part of their Australian Army Reserve service. The band performs at government, community, military, and returned service functions. Lancer Band members have deployed on warlike and domestic operations, with trumpeters serving in the Boer War through to recent deployments for Operation Resolute, Operation Bushfire Assist and Operation COVID19 Assist.

The band is able to perform in a number of ensemble formats, including a full military marching band, a big band or jazz ensemble, a rock band, a jazz quartet, a wind or brass quartet, and an acoustic ensemble. Buglers and drummers of the drum corps can also be detached to support functions individually.

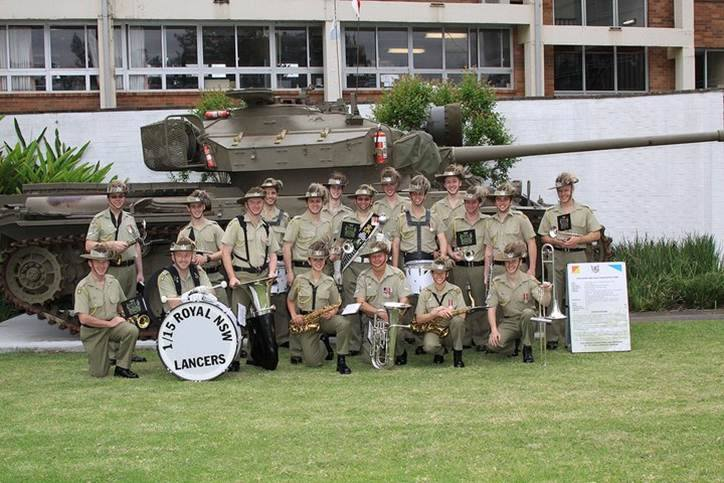
Lancer Band in front of an armoured vehicle

Members of the band are musicians by their Army trade, and this is their primary role within the Regiment and the Army. Entry to the band is based on competitive audition through the Defence Force School of Music and the Australian Army Band Corps.

The band has performed at a range of events, including the Sydney ANZAC Day March, Hills Centenary of ANZAC, Manly Jazz Festival, and the Lancers Parade in Parramatta.

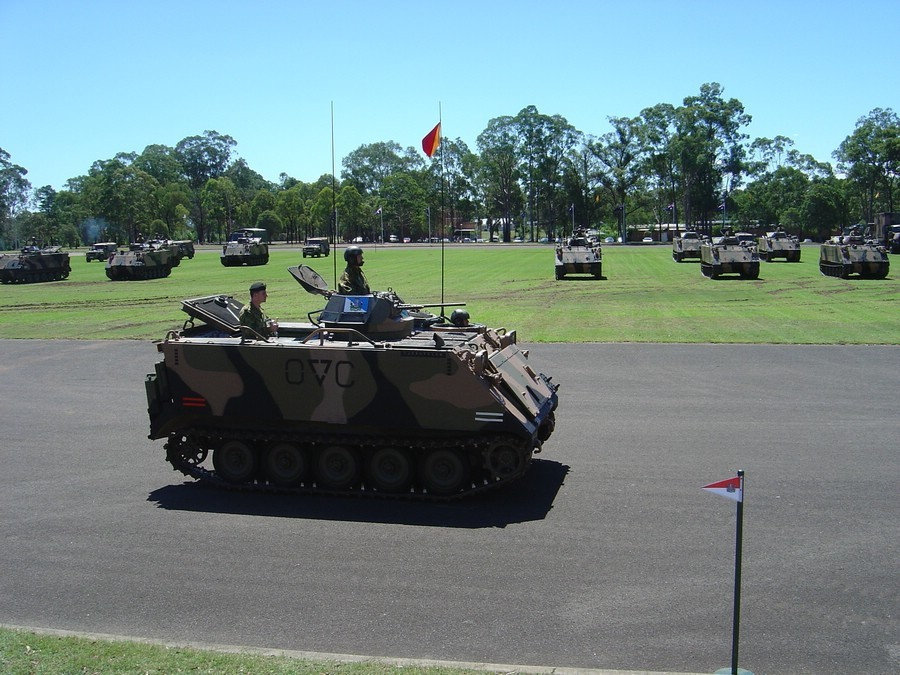
Bugler in CO's AFV

The band regularly performs in support of local Returned and Services League of Australia events and commemorations, and assists other Army units with musical support for parades, march-outs, and regimental balls and dinners. In 2015, the Lancer Band achieved a significant amount of media and internet attention after a recording of the iconic song "I Was Only Nineteen", originally recorded by Redgum. The recording on YouTube was widely shared and broadcast.

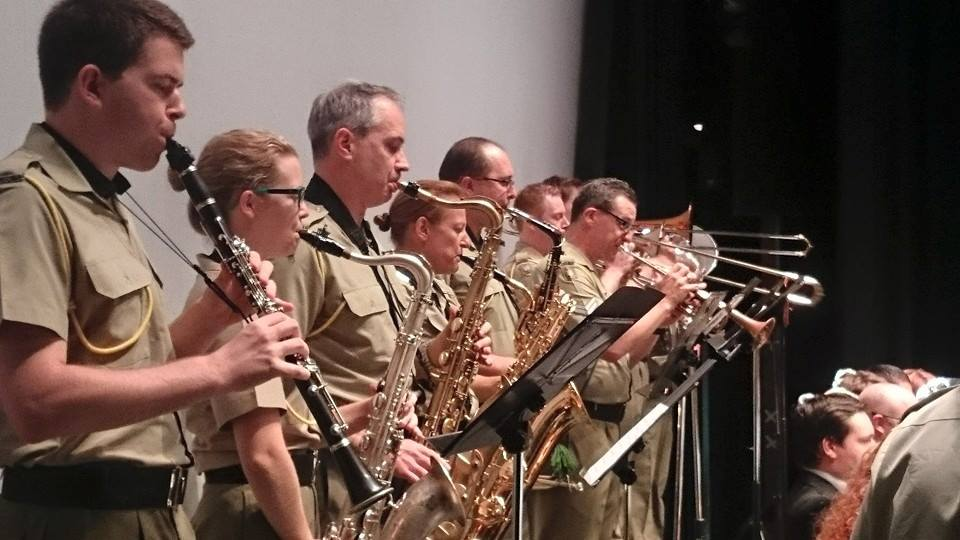
Lancer Band in concert

The Lancer Band is attached to the 1st/15th Royal New South Wales Lancers as the Regimental Band, an organic sub-unit. In more recent times, the musicians of the band have been members of the Australian Army Band Corps rather than troopers of the Royal Australian Armoured Corps. Musicians are trained in the Army's soldier skills.

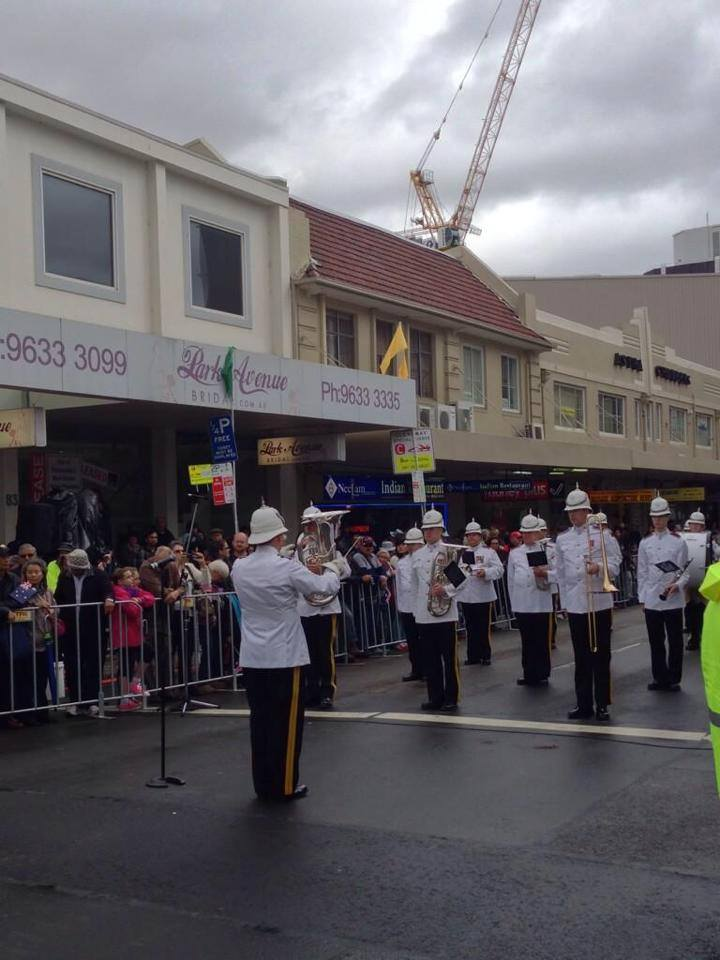
Lancer Band at the Lancers Parade in 2014

== Insignia and uniform ==
The Lancer Band wears the same uniforms as the rest of the Australian Army, with some variations. Members of the band wear the Regimental badge, black beret, lanyard, emu plumes, shoulder titles, and accoutrements as a trooper of the Lancer regiment. This is worn instead of the Australian Army Band Corps badges and accoutrements. Historically, members of the band have always been members of the Regiment and worn the same uniform, and this is maintained so that the band continues to represent the regiment. Historic Band Ceremonial uniforms (whites, blues, and maroon jackets) have been discontinued in favour of Army Service Dress Ceremonial. Qualified Musicians within the Army are entitled to wear the Musicians' Patch on their shoulder on ceremonial uniforms.

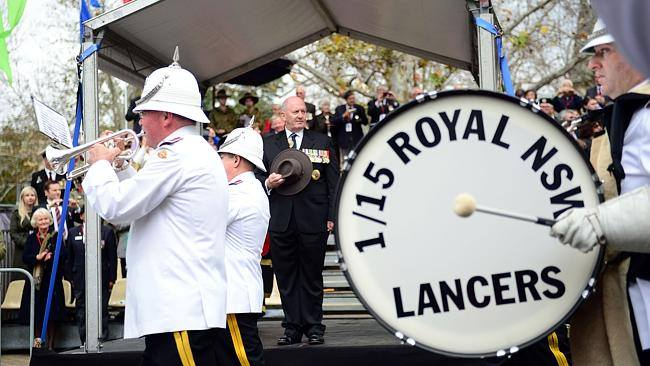
Lancer Band on parade

== History ==
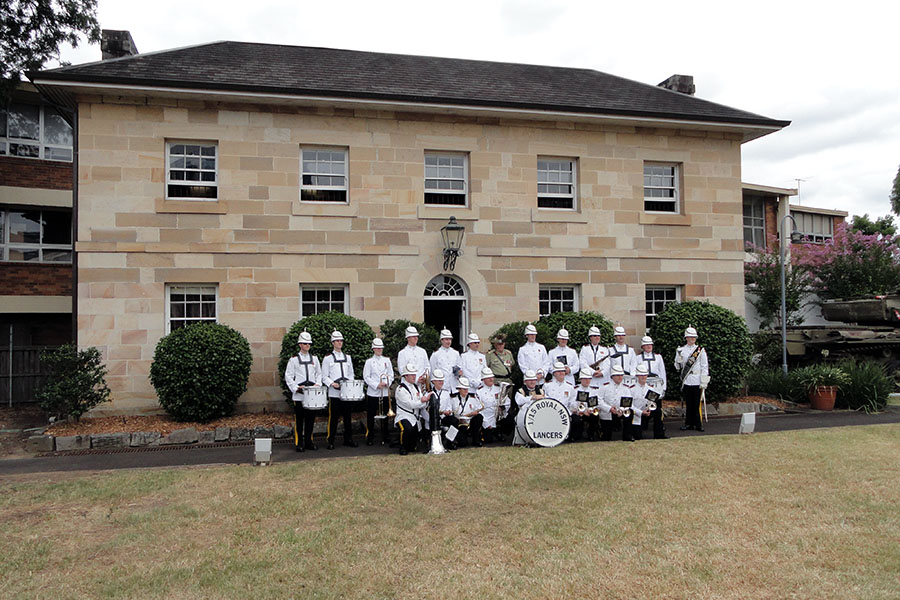
Linden House Museum

An official band was formed in 1889 and became fully funded in 1891. The Lancer Band, as it soon became known, has served continuously ever since.

The band was formed as a mounted brass band, performing on horseback. The regiment's original marches were March past at walk – "The Dragoon Guardsman", March past at trot – "The Cavalier", and March past at gallop – "Bonnie Dundee".

The Lancer Band has been known by that name and has been attached to the Lancers Regiment through all of its renamings and formations, including service during World Wars I and II. In the 1980s the band transitioned from being a Brass Band to a Military Band, with the addition of woodwinds and electric instruments.
