= Australian Army Band Corps =

- Active: 2 August 1968–present
- Country: Australia
- Branch: Australian Army
- Type: Corps
- March: The Minstrel Boy
- Anniversaries: August 2

Insignia
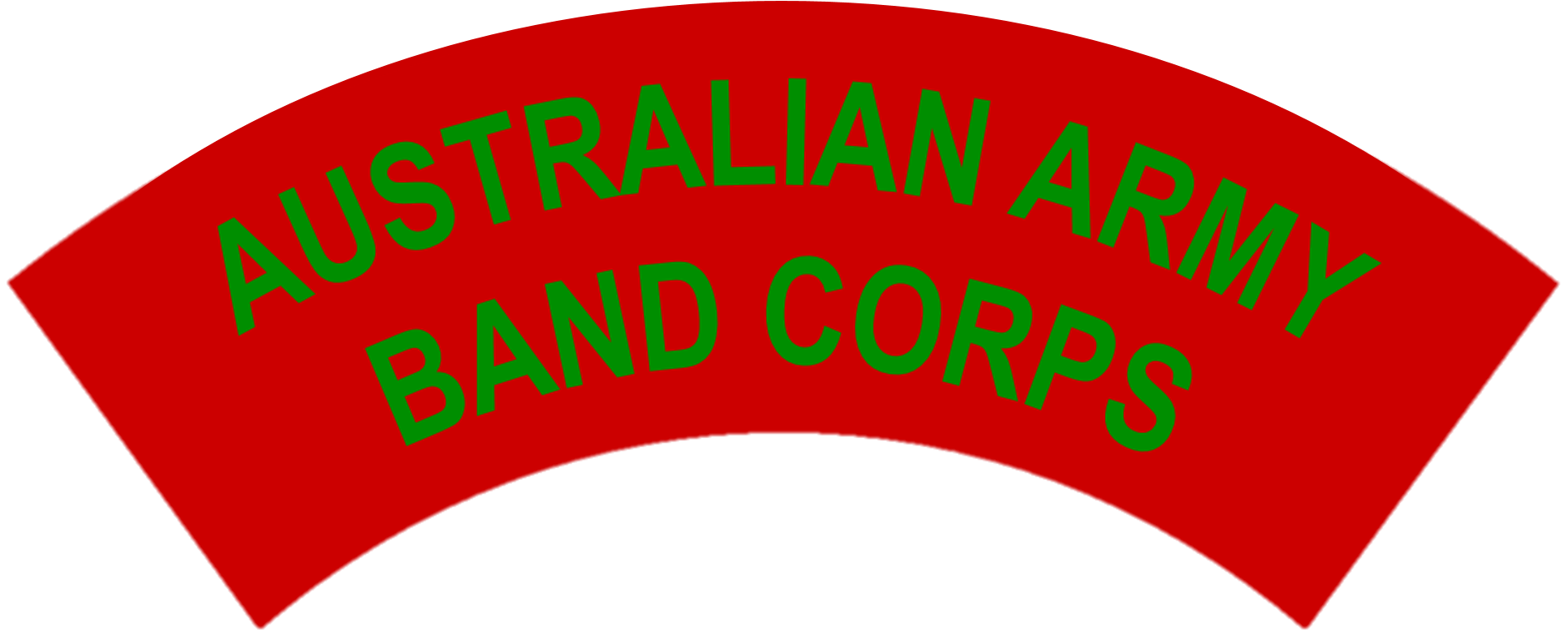
- AABC battledress flash.
- Abbreviation: AABC

The Australian Army Band Corps (AABC) is the Australian Army's musical branch. It is roughly the equivalent of the Music Branch (Canadian Forces) and the Royal Corps of Army Music of the British Army. The Corps was formed on 2 August 1968 and provides the Army with musical support and seeks to improve the Army's public image. It consists of 11 individual bands; five full-time and six part-time which are located in the capital city of each state as well as the regional cities of Wagga Wagga, Townsville, and Newcastle.

The band’s mission is to support land operations and strategy through military and community engagement.

== History ==
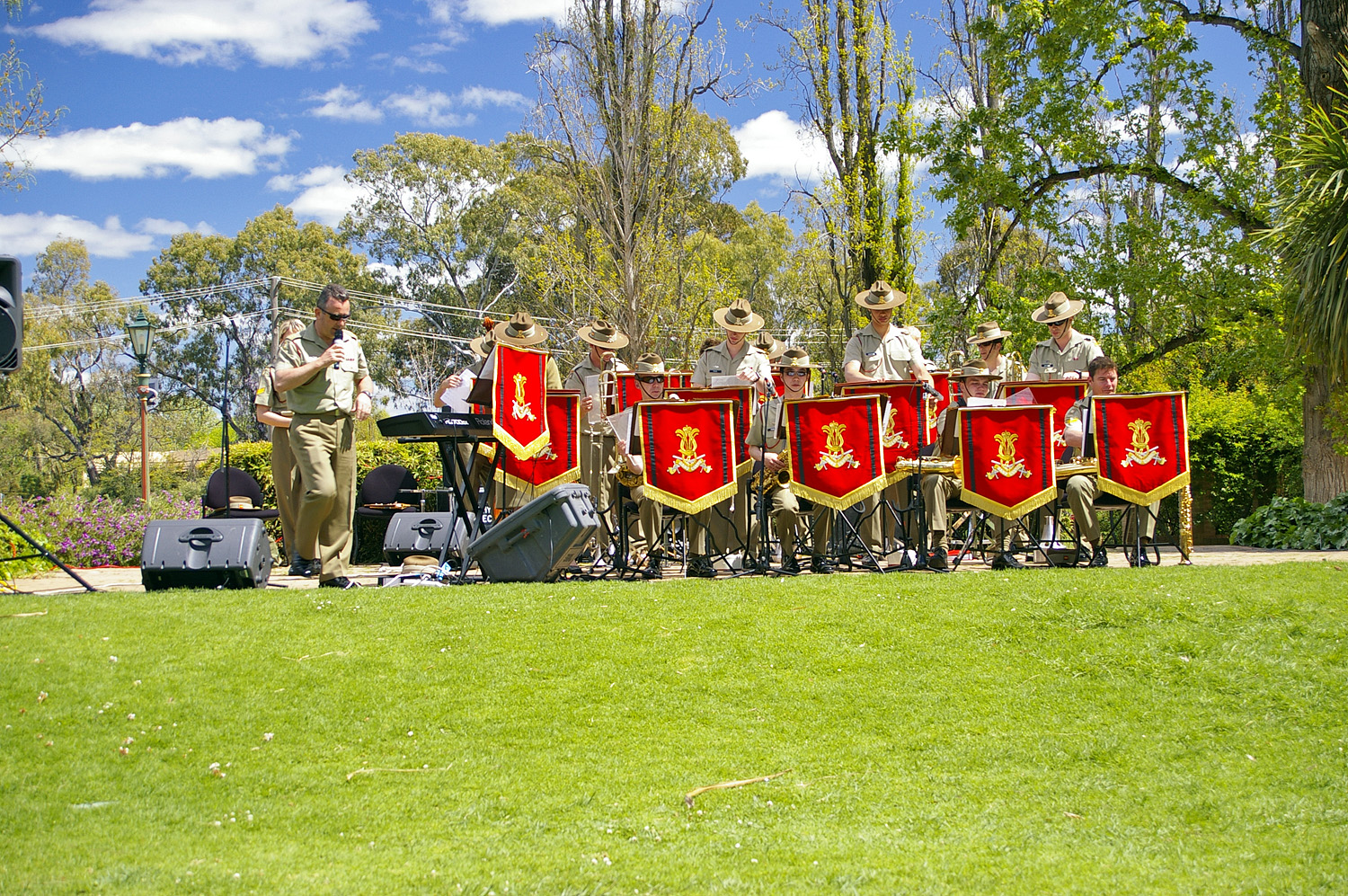
Australian Army Band, Kapooka

After World War II there was a need to make an assessment of the state of Army Bands. In 1951, Captain R.A. Newman was appointed the first Director of Music and in 1953 an Army School of Music was established to provide standardized formal training for Army musicians. Until 1961, Newman held the concurrent roles of Director of Music and Commanding Officer of the Army School of Music. In the 1960s focus centered on the conversion from brass band to military band instrumentation. First with the Band of the Royal Military College in 1964, all Regular Army bands were converted to this new format by 1974. Prior to the formation of the (AABC), Army musicians were held on the Royal Australian Infantry Corps Special List. It was the ambition of senior band personnel to have the specialization of music recognized by the creation of a corps. This goal was realized on 2 August 1968 with the establishment of the AABC, the first of its type in the world. After the creation of the AABC, bands previously belonging to infantry battalions were reassigned to become area bands and were affiliated with particular host corps.

Three of the now former bands were recognized by the granting of Freedom of Entry to their units:

- 1MD Band (AAB Brisbane) – City of Brisbane in 1988
- 1MD Band (AAB Brisbane) – City of Gold Coast in 1989
- 1MD Band (AAB Brisbane) – Shire of Redland in 1989

== Composition ==
- Australian Army Band Headquarters

Full Time Bands

- Band of the Royal Military College
- Australian Army Band Sydney
- Australian Army Band Brisbane
- Australian Army Band Kapooka
- Band of the 1st Battalion, Royal Australian Regiment

Part Time Bands

- Australian Army Band Tasmania
- Australian Army Band Perth
- Australian Army Band Newcastle
- Band of the 1st Brigade (formerly Australian Army Band Darwin)
- Australian Army Band Melbourne
- Australian Army Band Adelaide

== Names of former bands in the Australian Army ==
Historical names of military bands in the Australian Army. Some of the bands were pre formation of the AABC, while others were the previous names of current bands. They include:

- Army School of Music (ASM)
- Band of the 3rd Battalion, Royal Australian Regiment
- Band of the 5th Battalion, Royal Australian Regiment
- Southern Command Band
- Eastern Command Band
- Northern Command Band
- Central Command Band
- Western Command Band
- Tasmanian Command Band
- Band of the Royal Australian Artillery
- Band of the Royal Australian Engineers
- Band of the Royal Australian Corps of Signals
- Band of the Royal Australian Armoured Corps
- Australian Army Band Singapore
- 1st Recruit Training Battalion Band
- North Queensland Army Band
- 1st Military District Band
- 2nd Military District Band
- 3rd Military District Band
- 4th Military District Band
- 5th Military District Band
- 6th Military District Band
- 7th Military District Band

== AABC Association ==
The AABC Association originated from an idea expressed at the opening of the J.J. Shelton Band Centre at the Army Recruit Training Centre in March 1987. The association organized its first meeting on 10 June 1989, during which it was formally established. Since then the association has held reunions throughout Australia every year, growing to be an organization parallel to the Returned and Services League of Australia.

The goals of the association include the following:

- The communication between all former members of Army bands through personal contact and annual reunions
- To foster the development of relations between former and current serving members of the AAVC.
- To support the activities of the AABC

The AABC Association was incorporated in Victoria on 5 October 2004. The association is led by an Executive Committee which is composed of a President, a Vice President and a Secretary.

== Gallery ==
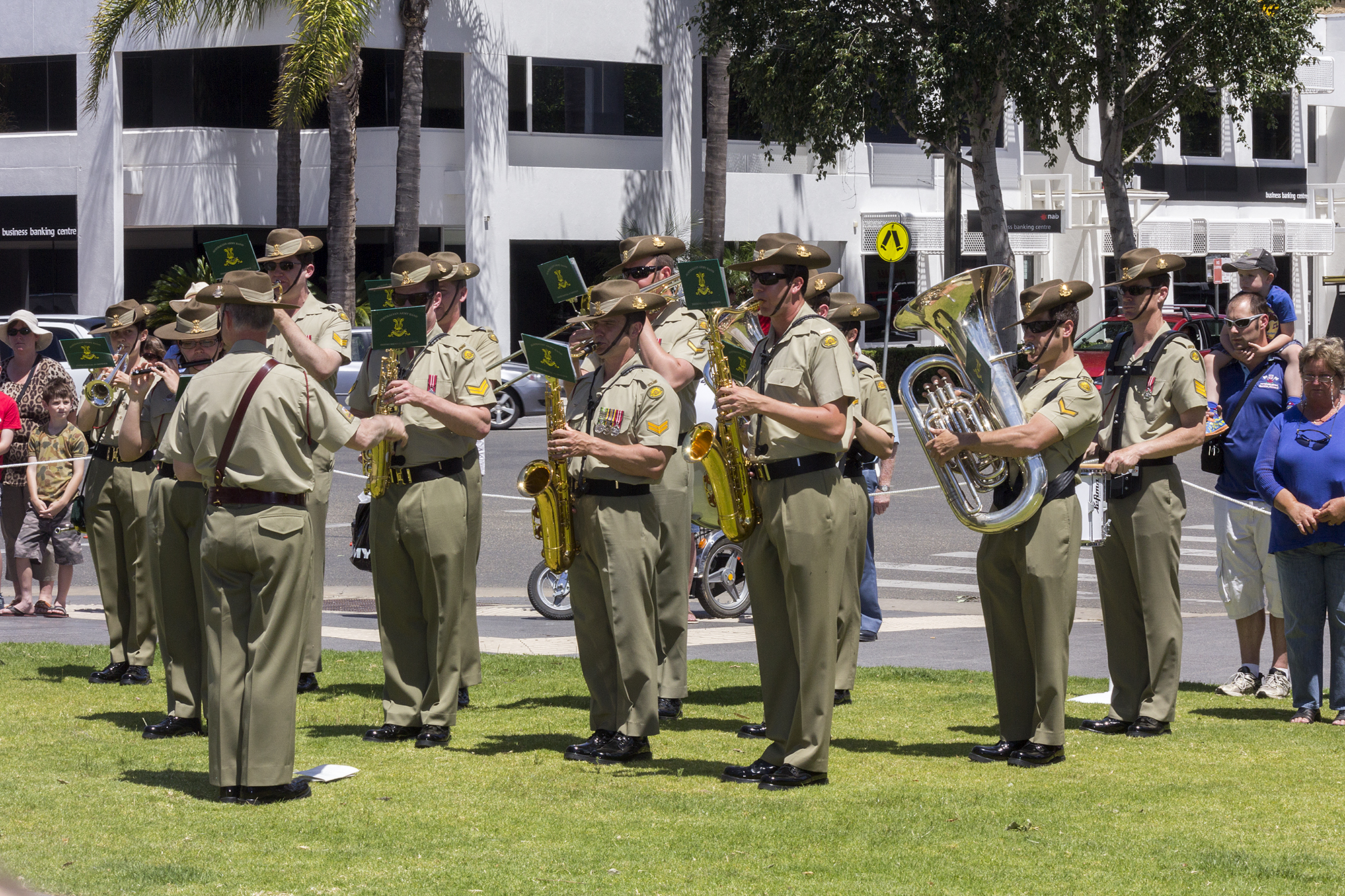
Australian Army Band Kapooka at a Kangaroo March centenary commemoration ceremony

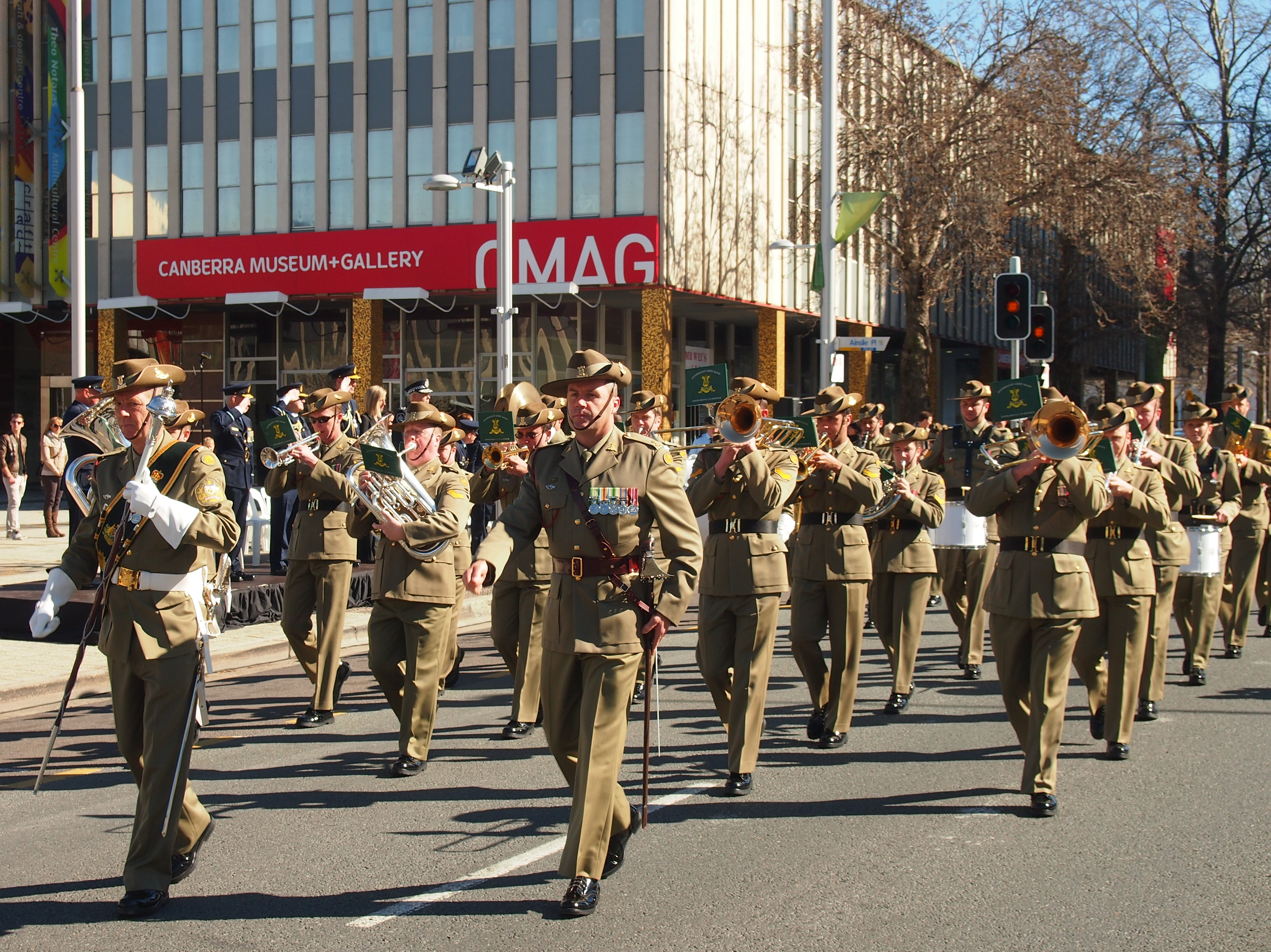
The Australian Army Band Corps at the No. 28 Squadron RAAF freedom of the city parade in Canberra, 2013.

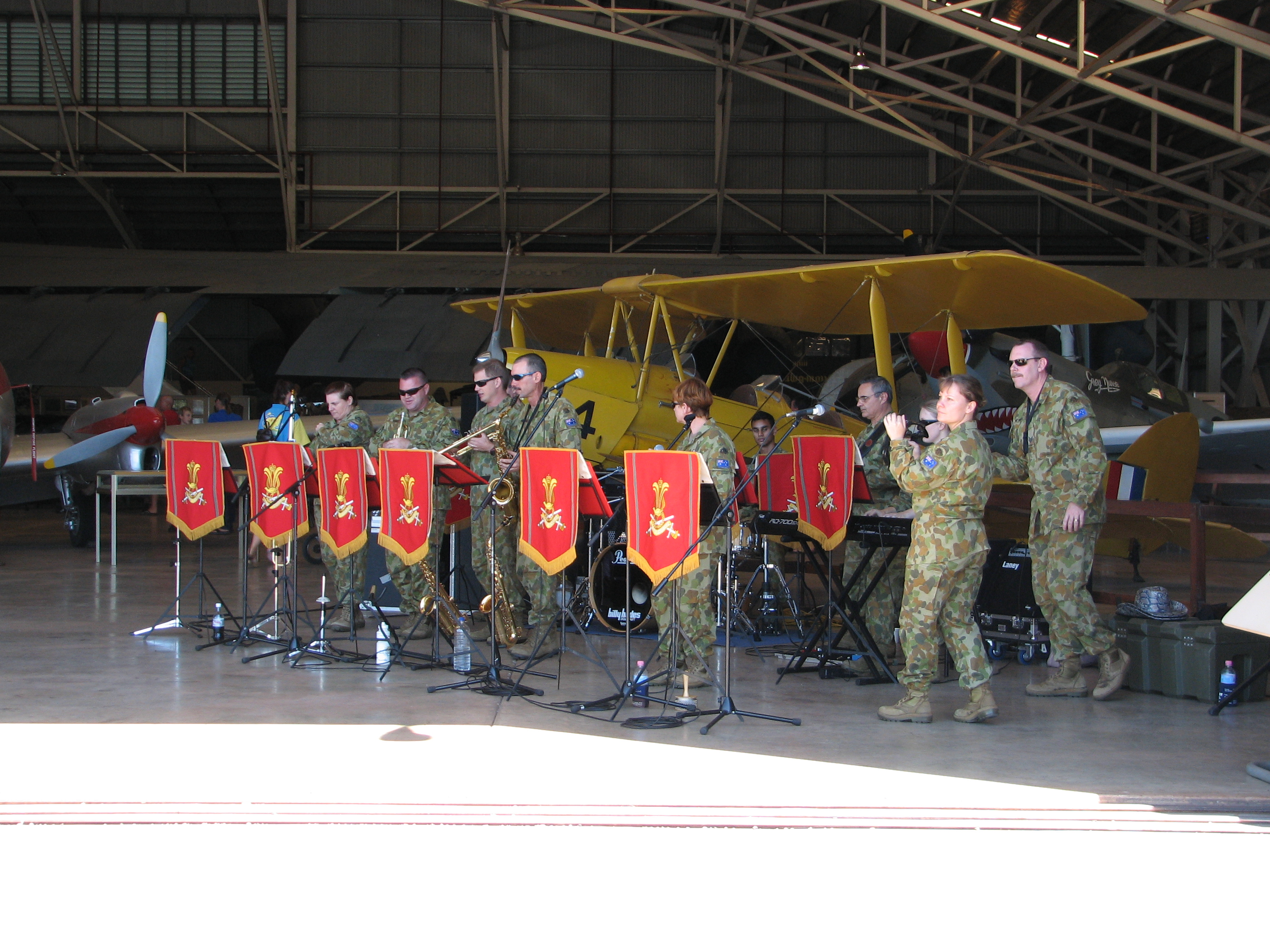
Australian Army Band Darwin in April 2008

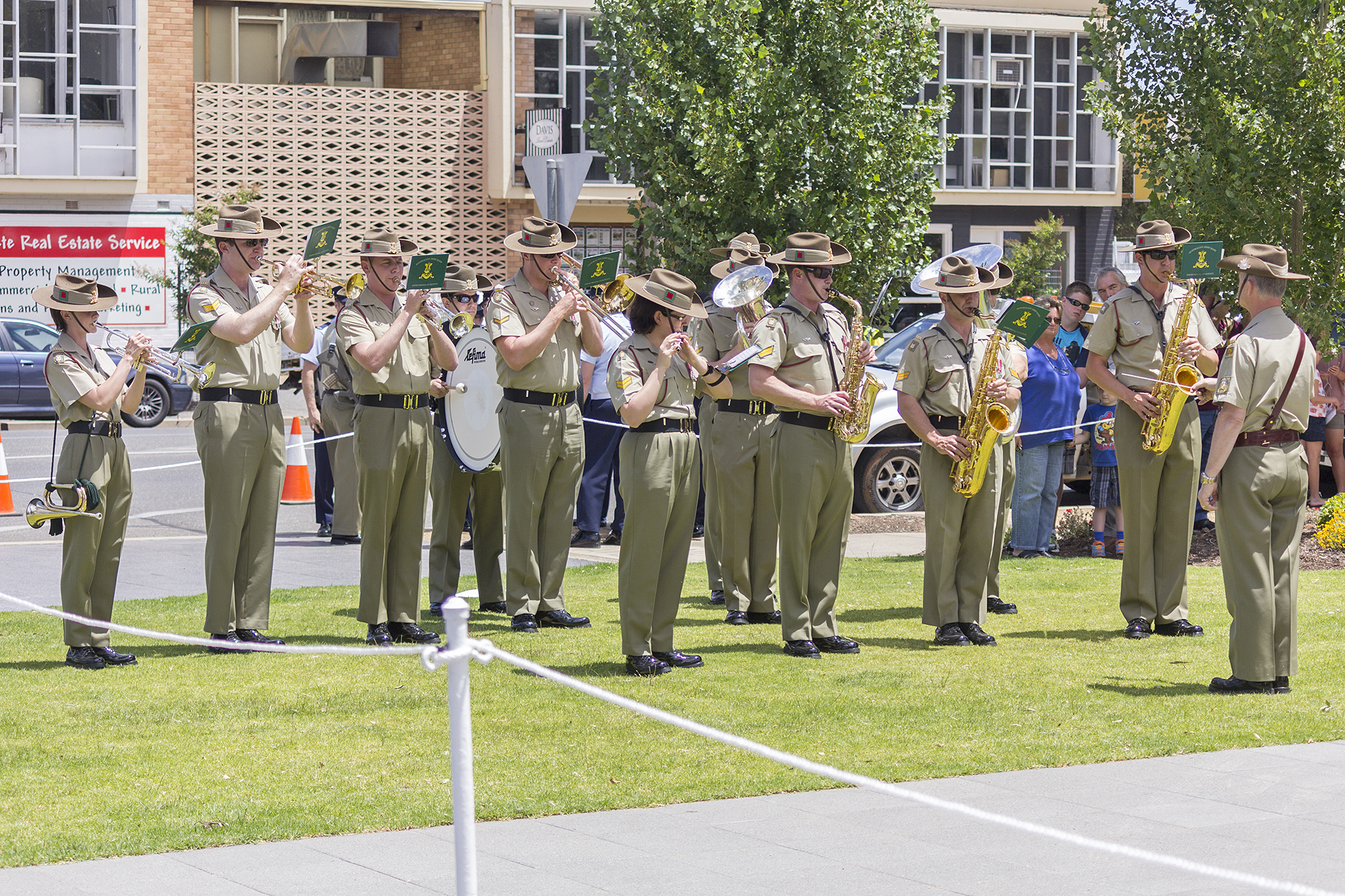
Army Band Kapooka

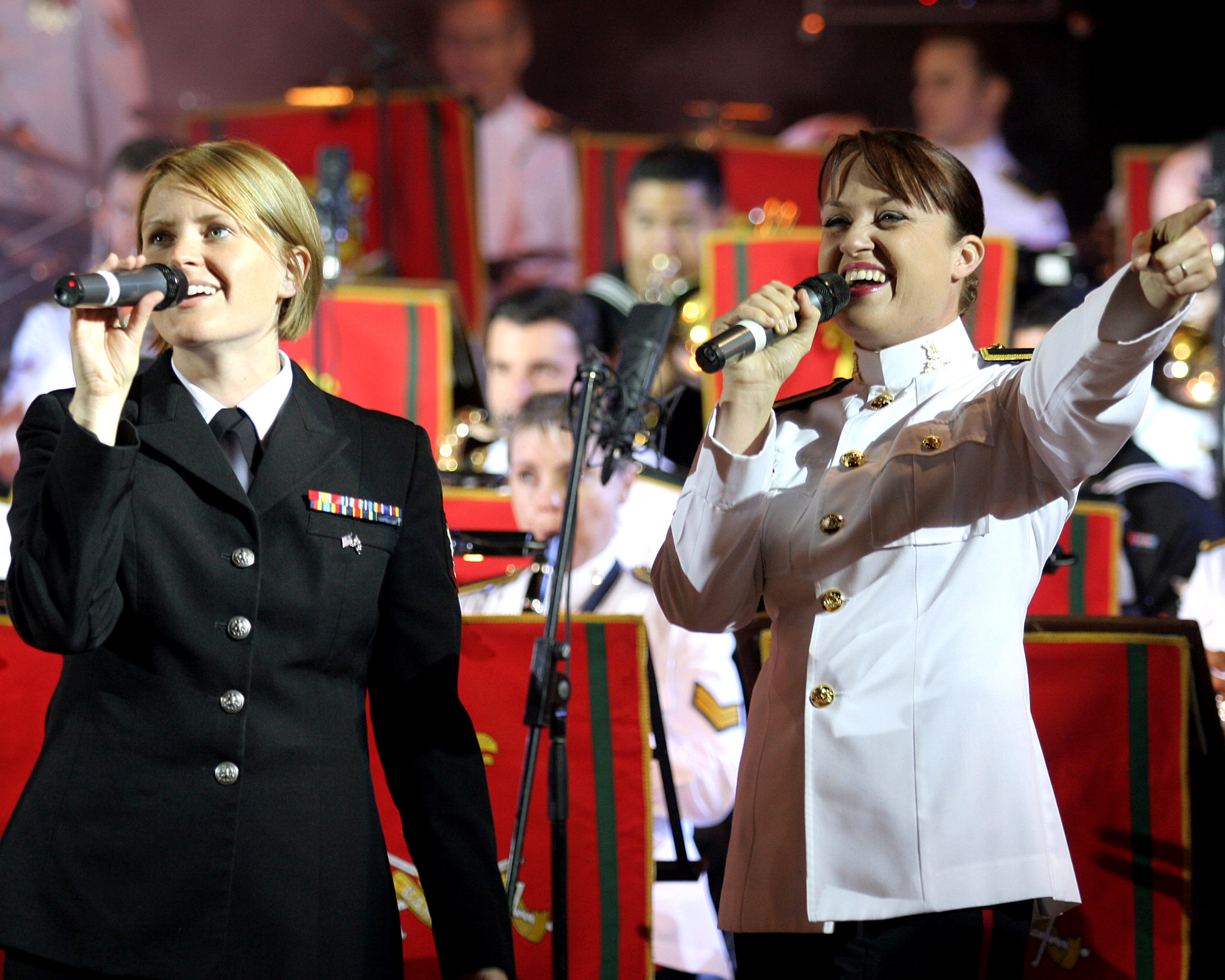
Jessica Hatfield, a vocalist with the United States Navy 7th Fleet Band (left), and Tanya Christensen, a vocalist with Australian Army Band Brisbane singing Waltzing Matilda at a concert.

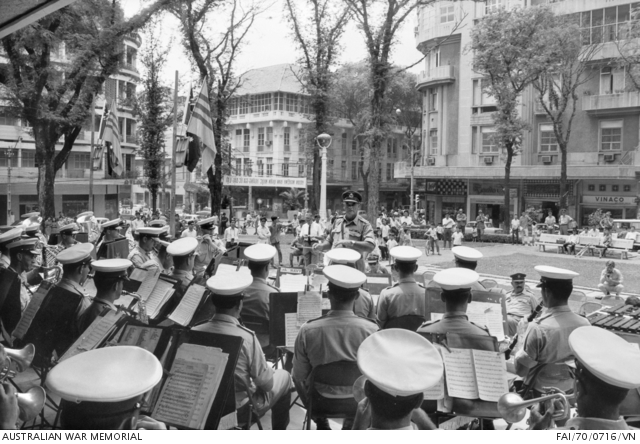
Northern Command Band performs in Chi Lang Gardens, Saigon in October 1970

== See also ==
- Army Recruit Training Centre
- Defence Force School of Music
- The Lancer Band
- RVR Pipes and Drums Association
- Australia's Federation Guard

Preceded by Australian Army Psychology Corps	Australian Army Order of Precedence	Succeeded by Royal Australian Army Nursing Corps
