= Royal Australian Navy Band =

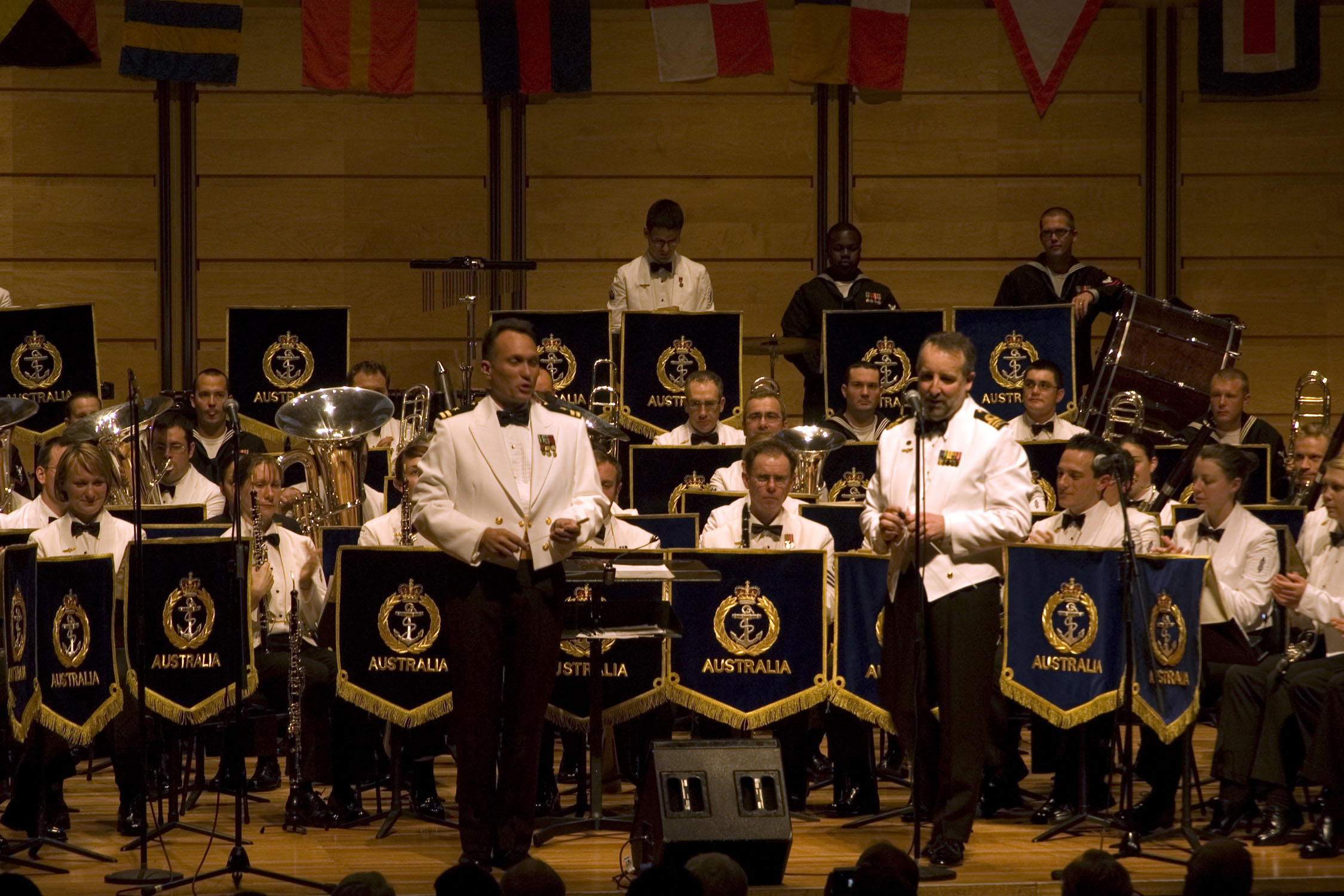
- Active: 1913; 113 years ago
- Country: Australia
- Branch: Royal Australian Navy
- Size: 100 full time musicians 100 Reserve (part-time) musicians
- Garrison/HQ: Sydney
- Motto: Serving in Harmony

Commanders
- Current commander: Commander Andrew Stokes

Insignia
- Naval Ensign (1967–present)
- Abbreviation: RAN Band

The Royal Australian Navy Band (RAN Band) is the Royal Australian Navy's official musical branch. The band comprises two full-time detachments and five part-time detachments positioned across Australia, and is one of the few platforms in which Navy can deliver its message to the people of Australia. The current Commanding Officer and Director of Music is Commander Andrew Stokes.

== History ==
In 1893, the New South Wales Naval Brigade Band comprised 22 personnel. Another of the very early naval bands was the Band of the Victorian Naval Brigade which was present (as a band of the Commonwealth Naval Force in 1901) at the arrival of the US Navy's "Great White Fleet" into Port Phillip Bay in 1908.

On 10 July 1911, King George V gave the Commonwealth Naval Forces the name of Royal Australian Navy.

On 21 June 1913, six musicians (recruited in Melbourne) were sent to the United Kingdom to join up with a number of ex-bandsmen from the British Navy to form the Royal Australian Navy Band. The members of the band returned to Sydney on 4 October 1913.

During WWII, the Korean War and the Vietnam War, musicians of the band performed at concerts for Australian troops.

== Composition ==
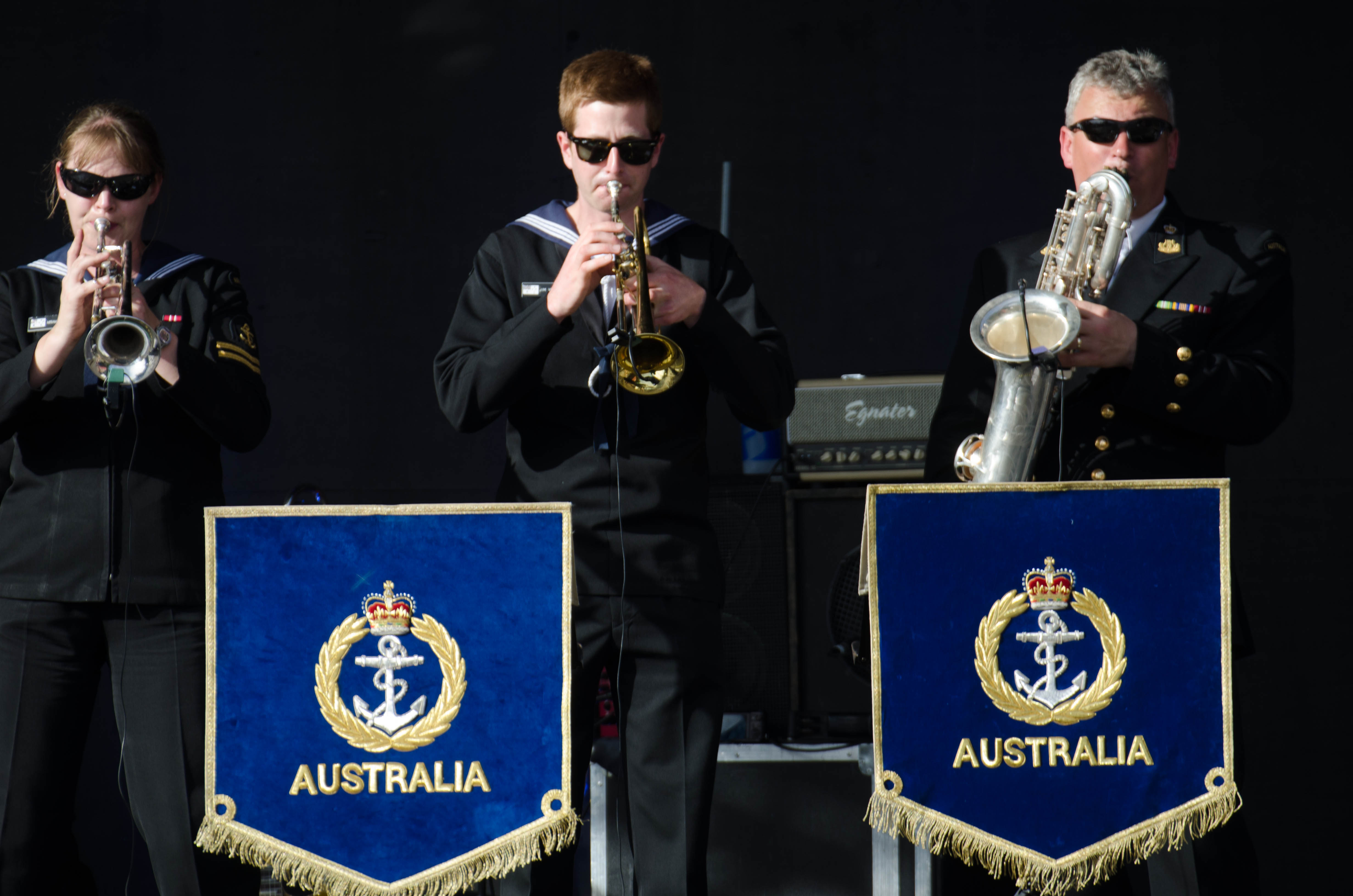

=== Detachments ===
The different detachments of the band include:

- RAN Band Sydney (full-time)
- RAN Band Melbourne (full-time)
- RAN Band Queensland (part-time)
- RAN Band South Australia (part-time)
- RAN Band Tasmania (part-time)
- RAN Band Western Australia (part-time)
- RAN Band Northern Territory (part-time)

=== Ceremonial Drums ===
The Ceremonial Drums of the RAN Band were commissioned by the Government of Australia on July 10, 1961 to mark the 50th anniversary of the band's naming. The set consists of eight side drums, two tenor drums and one bass drum.

== Repertoire ==
The repertoire of the RAN Band includes but is not limited to:

- Serving in Harmony
- Duke of York
- On The Quarterdeck
- March of the Royal Australian Navy
- Scipio
- The Middy
- Scrap Iron Flotilla
- Warship
- Waltzing Matilda
- Abide With Me
- Amazing Grace
- Crimond
- Deep Harmony
- Eternal Father
- O God Our Help
- Advance Australia Fair (Australia's national anthem)
- God Save the King (Australia's royal anthem)

== See also ==
- The Lancer Band
- Australian Army Band Corps
- Royal Australian Air Force Band
