= List of Australian Army installations =

This is a list of current facilities and installations operated or used by the Australian Army.

== Current Bases ==
=== Australian Capital Territory ===
- Australian Defence Force Headquarters - Canberra
- Royal Military College, Duntroon - Canberra
- Australian Defence College - Canberra
- Australian Defence Force Academy - Canberra
- Majura Military Training Area - Canberra
- HMAS Harman - Canberra

=== New South Wales ===
- Forces Command - Sydney
- Holsworthy Barracks – Holsworthy, Liverpool Military Area, Sydney
- Steele Barracks – Moorebank, Liverpool Military Area, Sydney
- Blamey Barracks – Kapooka, Kapooka Military Area, Wagga Wagga
- Randwick Barracks - Sydney
- Victoria Barracks - Sydney
- Lone Pine Barracks - Singleton
- Timor Barracks - Ermington, Sydney
- Bullecourt Barracks - Adamstown (Newcastle)
- Lancer Barracks - Parramatta, Sydney

=== Northern Territory ===
- Larrakeyah Barracks – Darwin
- Robertson Barracks – Darwin
- Mount Bundey Training Area - Mount Bundey
- Kangaroo Flats Training Area - Berry Springs
- Bradshaw Field Training Area - Timber Creek

=== Queensland ===
- Victoria Barracks – Brisbane
- Borneo Barracks – Darling Downs Military Area, Cabarlah
- Kokoda Barracks – Canungra (near Brisbane)
- Gallipoli Barracks – Brisbane
- Lavarack Barracks – Townsville
- Army Aviation Centre – Darling Downs Military Area, Oakey
- Shoalwater Bay Military Training Area – Shoalwater Bay
- High Range Training Area - Townsville
- Porton Barracks – Cairns
- Camp Growl - Shoalwater Bay

=== South Australia ===
- Hampstead Barracks – Adelaide
- Keswick Barracks – Adelaide
- Warradale Barracks - Adelaide
- Woodside Barracks – Woodside
- Cultana Training Area - Cultana
- RAAF Base Edinburgh - Adelaide
- RAAF Base Woomera - Parham

=== Tasmania ===
- Anglesea Barracks - Hobart
- Derwent Barracks - Glenorchy
- Paterson Barracks - Launceston
- Youngtown Barracks - Launceston
- Kokoda Barracks - Devonport
- Warrane Barracks - Warrane
- Buckland Military Training Area - north of Richmond
- Burnie Army Reserve - Burnie
- Wivenhoe Barracks – Burnie

=== Victoria ===
- Latchford Barracks, Bonegilla – Albury/Wodonga Military Area
- Gaza Ridge Barracks, Bandiana – Albury/Wodonga Military Area
- Wadsworth Barracks, Bandiana – Albury/Wodonga Military Area
- Tobruk Barracks, Puckapunyal – Puckapunyal Military Area
- Hopkins Barracks, Puckapunyal – Puckapunyal Military Area
- Bridges Barracks, Puckapunyal – Puckapunyal Military Area
- Somme Barracks, Shepparton
- Simpson Barracks, Watsonia – Melbourne
- Maygar Barracks, Broadmeadows – Melbourne
- Oakleigh Barracks, Oakleigh South – Melbourne
- Ringwood Barracks, Ringwood East – Melbourne

=== Western Australia ===
- Campbell Barracks – Swanbourne
- Irwin Barracks – Karrakatta
- Lancelin Training Area - Lancelin
- Bindoon Military Training Area – Bindoon
- Taylor Barracks - Karratha

=== Overseas ===
- RMAF Butterworth, Malaysia

== Former Bases ==
=== Western Australia ===
- Leeuwin Barracks, Fremantle (vacated in 2017)
- Camp Northam, Northam (partially in use)

== See also ==
- List of Royal Australian Air Force installations
