= List of Australian military bases =

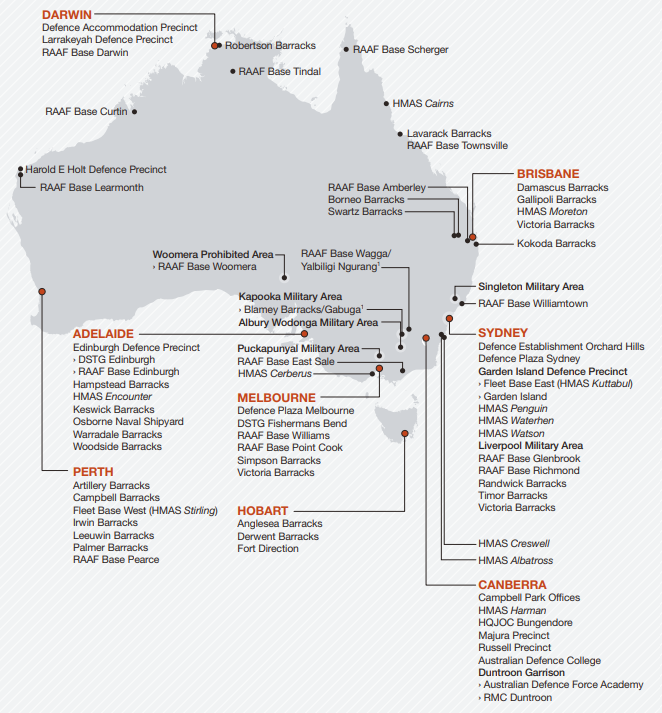
A map of the Australian Defence Force's main bases in Australia, as of 2025

The Australian Defence Force is made up of the Royal Australian Navy, Australian Army and the Royal Australian Air Force. These three military services have numerous military bases situated in all the States and Territories of Australia. Most of Australian Defence Force bases are equipped with Everyman's Welfare Service recreation centres.

== Australian Defence Force (Joint) ==
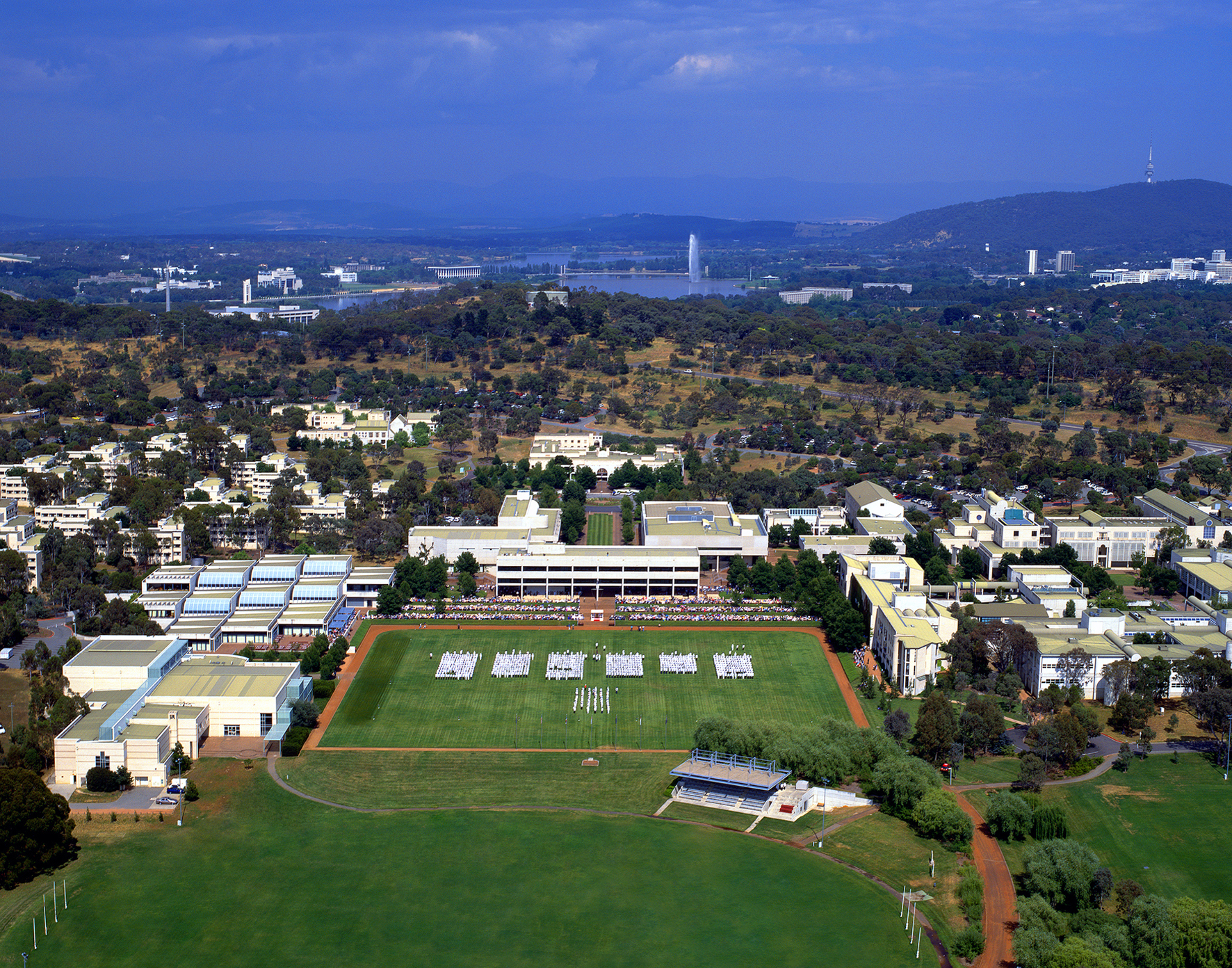
The Australian Defence Force Academy in Canberra

=== Australian Capital Territory ===
- Australian Defence Force Academy – Canberra
- Majura Training Area - Canberra

=== New South Wales ===
- Headquarters Joint Operations Command (HQJOC) – Bungendore
- Defence Establishment Orchard Hills – Orchard Hills
- Defence Establishment Myambat – Denman
- Defence Plaza Sydney – Sydney

=== Northern Territory ===
- Defence Establishment Berrimah – Berrimah
- Joint Defence Facility – Pine Gap

=== Victoria ===
- Defence Plaza Melbourne – Melbourne
- Swan Island – Port Philip
- Victoria Barracks Melbourne – Melbourne

== Australian Army ==
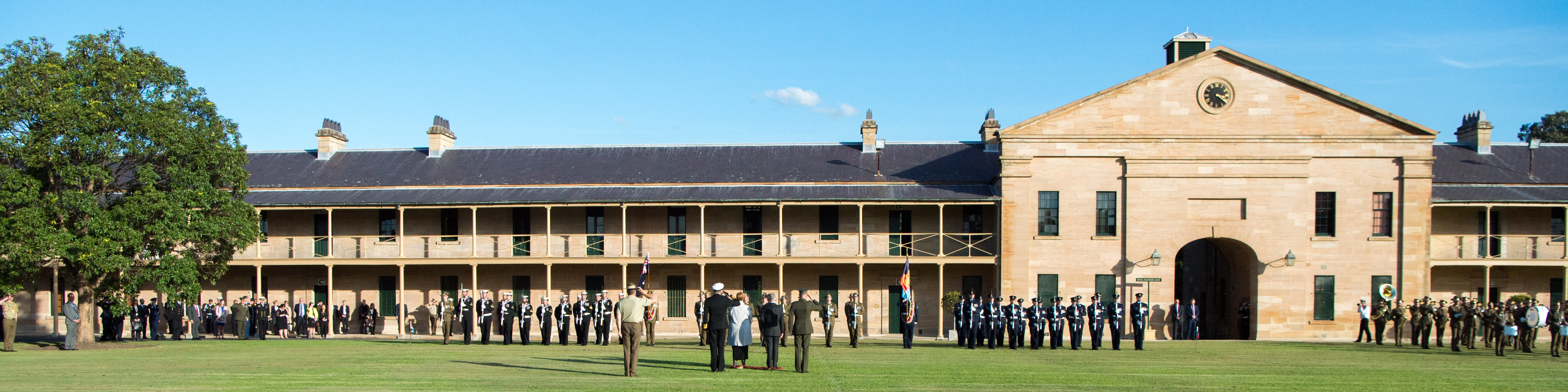
Part of Victoria Barracks in Sydney

=== Australian Capital Territory ===
- Royal Military College, Duntroon – Canberra

=== New South Wales ===
- Holsworthy Barracks – Holsworthy, Liverpool Military Area, Sydney
- Blamey Barracks – Kapooka, Kapooka Military Area, Wagga Wagga
- Randwick Barracks – Sydney
- Victoria Barracks – Sydney
- Lone Pine Barracks – Singleton
- Timor Barracks – Ermington, Sydney
- Bullecourt Barracks – Adamstown (Newcastle)
- Lancer Barracks – Parramatta, Sydney

=== Northern Territory ===
- Larrakeyah Barracks – Darwin
- Robertson Barracks – Darwin
- Mount Bundey Training Area - Mount Bundey
- Kangaroo Flats Training Area – Berry Springs
- Bradshaw Field Training Area – Timber Creek

=== Queensland ===
- Victoria Barracks – Brisbane
- Borneo Barracks – Darling Downs Military Area, Cabarlah
- Kokoda Barracks – Canungra
- Gallipoli Barracks – Enoggera
- Lavarack Barracks – Townsville
- Swartz Barracks – Oakey, QLD
- Shoalwater Bay Military Training Area – Shoalwater Bay
- Porton Barracks – Cairns
- Cowley Beach Training Area - Cowley Beach

=== South Australia ===
- Hampstead Barracks – Adelaide
- Keswick Barracks – Adelaide
- Warradale Barracks – Adelaide
- Woodside Barracks – Woodside
- RAAF Base Edinburgh – Adelaide

=== Tasmania ===
- Anglesea Barracks – Hobart
- Derwent Barracks – Glenorchy
- Paterson Barracks – Launceston
- Youngtown Barracks – Launceston
- Kokoda Barracks – Devonport
- Buckland Military Training Area – north of Richmond
- Wivenhoe Barracks – Burnie

=== Victoria ===
- Latchford Barracks, Bonegilla – Albury/Wodonga Military Area
- Gaza Ridge Barracks, Bandiana – Albury/Wodonga Military Area
- Wadsworth Barracks, Bandiana – Albury/Wodonga Military Area
- Tobruk Barracks, Puckapunyal – Puckapunyal Military Area
- Hopkins Barracks, Puckapunyal – Puckapunyal Military Area
- Bridges Barracks, Puckapunyal – Puckapunyal Military Area
- Simpson Barracks, Watsonia – Melbourne
- Maygar Barracks, Broadmeadows – Melbourne
- Oakleigh Barracks, Oakleigh South – Melbourne

=== Western Australia ===
- Campbell Barracks – Swanbourne
- Irwin Barracks – Karrakatta
- Palmer Barracks – Perth
- Lancelin Training Area – Lancelin
- Bindoon Military Training Area – Bindoon
- Taylor Barracks – Karratha

== Royal Australian Air Force ==
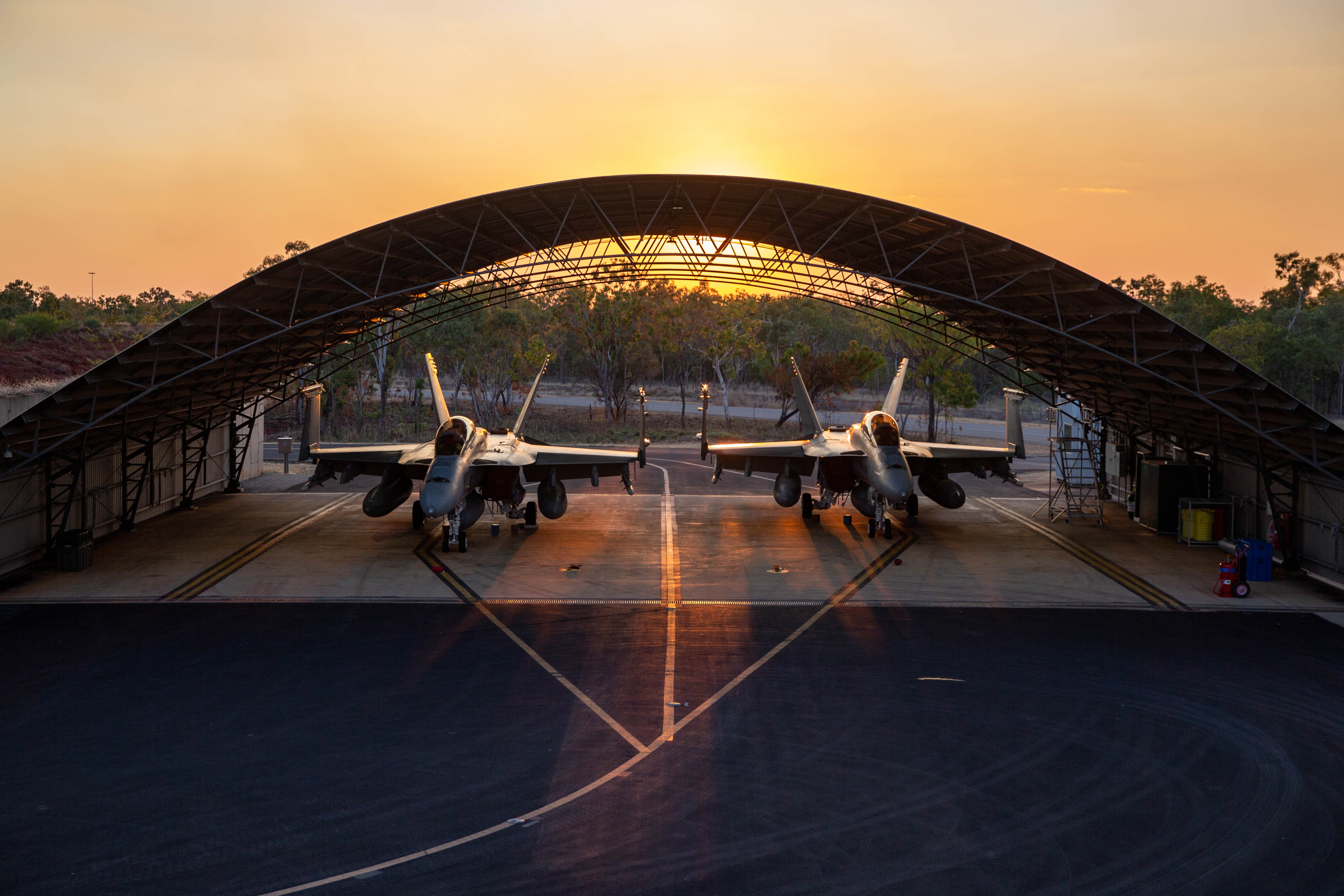
Two F/A-18F Super Hornets in an aircraft shelter at RAAF Base Tindal

=== Australian Capital Territory ===
- Defence Establishment Fairbairn – Canberra

=== New South Wales ===
- RAAF Base Glenbrook – Sydney
- RAAF Base Richmond – Sydney
- RAAF Base Wagga – Wagga Wagga
- RAAF Base Williamtown – Newcastle

=== Northern Territory ===
- RAAF Base Darwin – Darwin
- RAAF Base Tindal – Katherine
- Delamere Air Weapons Range – Katherine

=== Queensland ===
- RAAF Base Amberley – Brisbane
- RAAF Base Scherger (bare base) – Weipa
- RAAF Base Townsville – Townsville

=== South Australia ===
- RAAF Base Edinburgh – Adelaide
- RAAF Woomera Range Complex
  - RAAF Base Woomera

=== Victoria ===
- RAAF Base East Sale – Sale
- RAAF Base Williams – Point Cook – Melbourne
- RAAF Base Williams – Laverton – Melbourne

=== Western Australia ===
- RAAF Base Curtin (bare base) – Derby
- RAAF Gingin – Gingin
- RAAF Base Learmonth (bare base) – Exmouth
- RAAF Base Pearce – Perth

== Royal Australian Navy ==
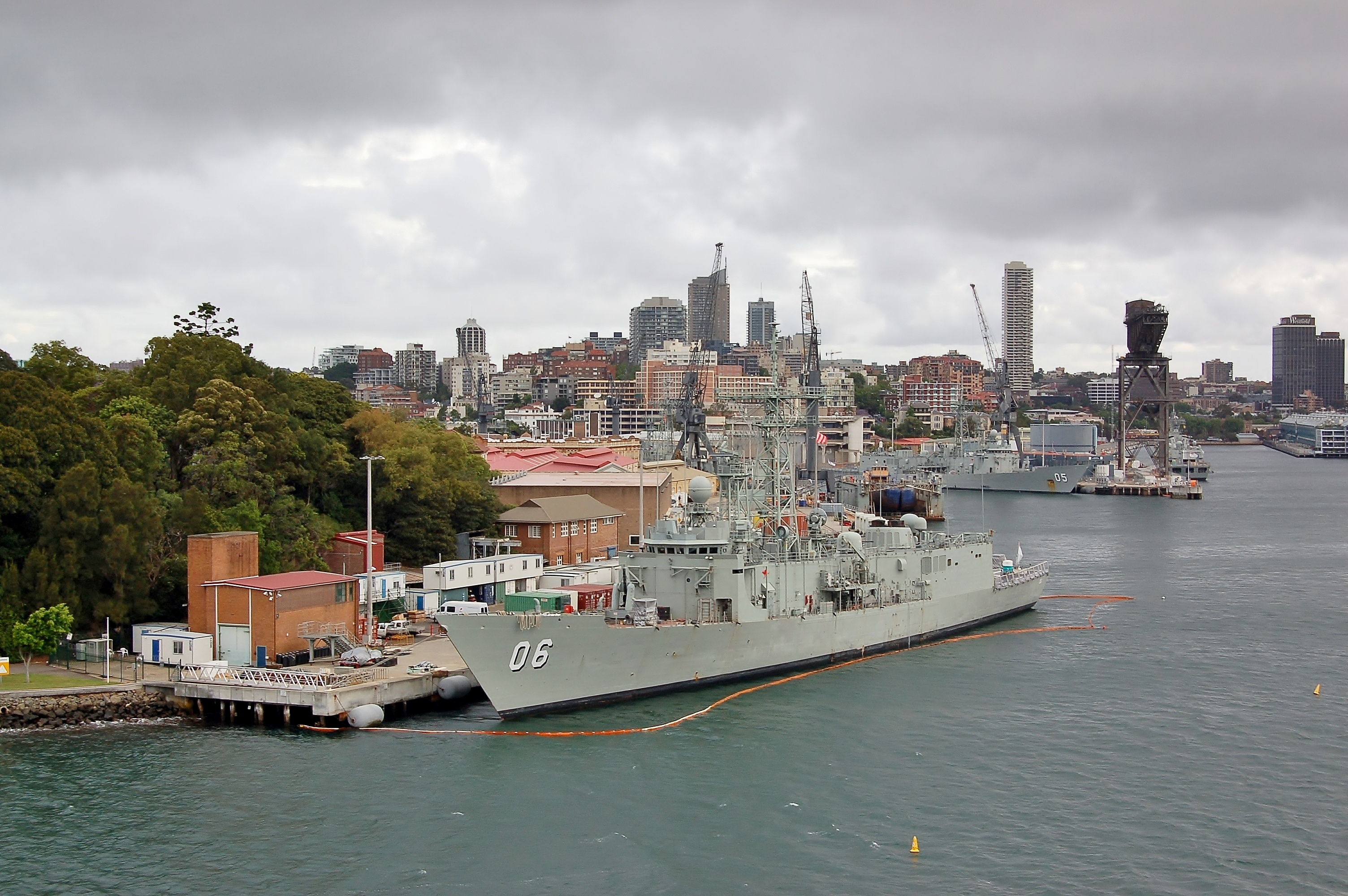
Warships at HMAS Kuttabul in Sydney

=== Australian Capital Territory ===
- HMAS Harman – Canberra

=== Jervis Bay Territory ===
- HMAS Creswell – Jervis Bay Territory

=== New South Wales ===
- HMAS Albatross – Nowra
- HMAS Kuttabul – Garden Island, Sydney
- HMAS Penguin – Balmoral, Sydney
- HMAS Waterhen – Waverton, Sydney
- HMAS Watson – Watsons Bay, Sydney

=== Northern Territory ===
- HMAS Coonawarra – Darwin

=== Queensland ===
- HMAS Cairns – Cairns
- HMAS Moreton – Brisbane

=== South Australia ===
- HMAS Encounter – Adelaide

=== Tasmania ===
- Navy Headquarters Tasmania, Hobart

=== Victoria ===
- HMAS Cerberus – Crib Point

=== Western Australia ===
- HMAS Stirling – Garden Island
- Naval Communication Station, Harold E Holt – Exmouth
