= Paterson Barracks =

Coordinates: 41.433385°S 147.135280°E

Paterson Barracks is an Australian Army barracks in Launceston, Tasmania. It was named after William Paterson (1755–1810), an officer in the New South Wales Corps. The barracks is the home of the 16th Field Battery, which is the oldest artillery unit in Australia. Paterson was also home to a depot of 10 Health company, part of the 2nd Force Support Battalion, which has its HQ at Derwent Barracks, Glenorchy (a suburb of Hobart) and also is the home for Army and Australian Air Force Cadets in the Launceston Area.

In 2017 it was announced by Marise Payne, the Minister of Defence that Patterson Barracks will no longer be used by Defence and all units currently using the site will be moved to Youngtown Barracks.
