= 8th Operational Support Unit =

- Active: 2024–current
- Country: Australia
- Branch: Australian Army
- Role: Logistics
- Part of: 2nd Division
- Headquarters location: Timor Barracks, Dundas, New South Wales

The 8th Operational Support Unit (8OSU) is an Australian Army logistics unit that was raised in 2024. It forms part of the 2nd Division.

== History ==
8OSU was raised on 15 January 2024, with its headquarters located at Timor Barracks, Dundas, New South Wales. Its role is to assess the logistical needs of deployed units, including by conducting reconnaissance of areas before they arrive. This reflected a lesson learned from the Australian Defence Force's deployments in response to natural disasters in Australia, in which military units had sometimes caused shortages of fuel and other supplies in regional areas.

8OSU is staffed mainly by logistics experts and is able to hire equipment and establish contracts for services needed to support deployments.

In December 2024 the 2nd Force Support Battalion was merged into 8OSU. This battalion included four sub-units in Tasmania and Victoria, and its personnel became part of 8OSU. The merger aimed to provide the 2nd Division with a specialist logistics capability.
