= Warrane (disambiguation) =

Warrane is a suburb of Hobart, Australia

Warrane may also refer to:

- Warrane Barracks, an Australian Army Barracks in the Hobart suburb of Mornington
- Warrane College, University of New South Wales, affiliated residential college with the University of New South Wales, Sydney Australia.
