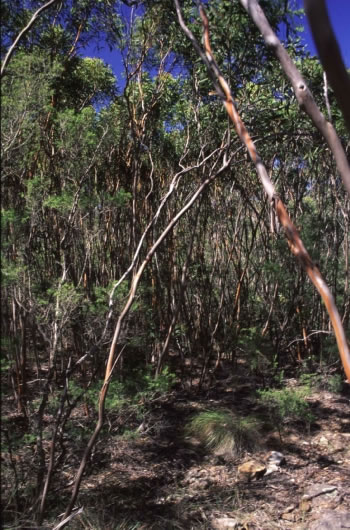

Conservation status
- Data Deficient (IUCN 3.1)

Scientific classification
- Kingdom: Plantae
- Clade: Tracheophytes
- Clade: Angiosperms
- Clade: Eudicots
- Clade: Rosids
- Order: Myrtales
- Family: Myrtaceae
- Genus: Eucalyptus
- Species: E. castrensis

Binomial name
- Eucalyptus castrensis K.D.Hill

= Eucalyptus castrensis =

Singleton mallee

Species of eucalyptus

Eucalyptus castrensis, commonly known as Singleton mallee or Pokolbin mallee box, is a species of mallee that is endemic to a small area of New South Wales in eastern Australia. It has mostly smooth bark, lance-shaped adult leaves, flower buds in groups of seven, white flowers and cup-shaped fruit.

== Description ==
Eucalyptus castrensis is a mallee that typically grows to a height of 8 metres (26 ft). It has smooth bronze-grey bark but older stems sometimes have a collar of rough bark near the base. Young plants have dull bluish green, egg-shaped to lance-shaped leaves that are 60–115 mm (2–5 in) long and 15–40 mm (0.6–2 in) wide. Adult leaves are glossy green, lance-shaped, 60–130 mm (2–5 in) long, 8–22 mm (0.3–0.9 in) wide on a petiole 4–15 mm (0.2–0.6 in) long. The flower buds are arranged in groups of seven on a peduncle 7–10 mm (0.3–0.4 in) long, the individual buds on a pedicel 1–5 mm (0.039–0.197 in) long. Mature buds are oval, 5–6 mm (0.20–0.24 in) long and 2–4 mm (0.079–0.16 in) wide with a conical operculum. Flowering has been observed in August and the flowers are white. The fruit is a woody, cup-shaped capsule, 4–5 mm (0.16–0.20 in) long and 4–6 mm (0.16–0.24 in) wide with the valves well below the rim.

== Taxonomy and naming ==
Eucalyptus castrensis was first formally described in 2002 by Ken Hill from a specimen collected on the Singleton Army Base and the description was published in the journal Telopea''. The specific epithet (castrensis) is derived from the Latin word castra meaning "camp" with the suffix -ensis meaning "of" or "from", referring to the occurrence of this eucalypt in the grounds of an army base.

== Distribution and habitat ==
Singleton mallee is only known from a single dense stand on an army base near Singleton where it grows on a low, broad sandstone ridge.

== Conservation status ==
This eucalypt is listed as "endangered" under the New South Wales Government Biodiversity Conservation Act 2016.
