= Adelaide Universities Regiment =

Regiment of the Australian Army

- Active: 1948–Present
- Country: Australia
- Branch: Australian Army Reserve
- Type: Training establishment
- Role: Army Reserve officer training
- Part of: 8th Brigade, Forces Command
- Garrison/HQ: Greenacres, South Australia
- Motto: Sapientia Omnia Vincit (Wisdom Conquers All)
- March: Highland Laddie (Quick); Morag of Dunvegan (Slow time)
- Anniversaries: 31 May 1948

Commanders
- Honorary Colonel: Brigadier Michael Burgess
- Commanding Officer: Lieutenant Colonel Scott Calvert
- Regimental Sergeant Major: Warrant Officer Class One Micheal Edwards

Insignia
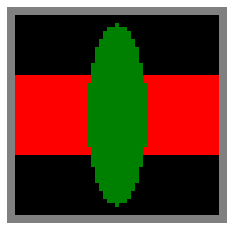
- Unit colour patch

Adelaide Universities Regiment (AUR) is an officer training unit of the Australian Army headquartered in Adelaide, South Australia. Currently AUR maintains a cadre staff of trained Regular and Reserve personnel who oversee and administer the training of Reserve officer cadets. The majority of the regiment is currently based at Hampstead Barracks. First formed in May 1948, the regiment maintains an alliance with the Royal Irish Regiment.

== History ==
The regiment was first formed in May 1948 as the "Adelaide University Regiment" under the command of Major (later Colonel) Rex J. Lipman when Australia's part-time military force, the Citizens Military Force (CMF) – which was later renamed the Army Reserve – was rebuilt following the end of the Second World War. The regiment's first honorary colonel was Arthur Blackburn, a Victoria Cross recipient, whose son, Richard (a prominent lawyer and veteran of the Second World War), became involved with the regiment upon its establishment and later served as its commanding officer between 1955 and 1957.

Like other Australian university regiments, upon formation AUR was established as an infantry unit providing military training to tertiary students. Part of the Royal Australian Infantry Corps (RA Inf), it consisted of a rifle company, a support company (with transport, mortar, signals, anti-tank and intelligence subunits) and a headquarters company; this was later expanded as machine-gun and assault pioneer sections were also raised.

Personnel were drawn from universities and teaching colleges in Adelaide and the regiment's first parade took place on 27 September 1948, when nearly 100 personnel were enlisted. Although these personnel were all part-time members, the regiment was assigned a small cadre of five regular personnel to undertake administrative functions.

At the regiment's first training camp, which was undertaken at Woodside in January 1949, 88 personnel turned out. This represented 98 percent of the regiment's strength at the time. As interest started to grow, the regiment was authorised an establishment of 21 officers and 389 other ranks, however, actual numbers remained low initially.

In 1950, the regiment was part of Central Command, along with the 10th and 27th Battalions. During this time it was headquartered at the University of Adelaide although parades were also undertaken at the Torrens Training Depot. Following the introduction of national service in the early 1950s the regiment's numbers began to grow. By 13 April 1953, AUR had an actual strength of 515 personnel of all ranks. As a result of this expansion, a second rifle company was raised. Between 1955 and 1958, the regiment used the Warradale depot as its base camp.

On 20 January 1957, the regiment received its colours. Presented by the then Governor of South Australia, Air Vice Marshal Sir Robert George, at the time they were the first colours to be presented to a South Australian unit in 30 years.

The end of national service in 1959 led to a rapid decrease in the regiment's size and by the end of the year AUR had only 116 personnel on its books. For the early part of the 1960s the regiment was maintained on a volunteer-only basis and as a result numbers remained low. In 1965, the regiment began to deliver part-time commissioning courses, while at the same time continuing to undertake its role as a "conventional rifle battalion", remaining part of RA Inf. Between 1965 and 1972 the regiment also served as a training institution for national servicemen who had chosen to serve in the CMF rather than the Regular Army. As a result of this, by 1968 AUR reached its "ceiling strength" of 650 personnel of all ranks.

In 1982, AUR established depots at Prospect and St Marys in order to draw recruits from Flinders University. This was short lived, however, as the St Marys depot was closed two years later. In 1991, the Australian Army underwent a Force Structure Review, the result of which was that AUR was reorganised to become solely focused upon the provision of training to Reserve officer cadets, under the banner of the Royal Military College of Australia. AUR relocated to Hampstead Barracks in Greenacres in 2001.

In 2008, the regiment was assigned to the 2nd Division and tasked with the provision of commissioned officers to units from the 9th Brigade, which sees them train personnel from South Australia, Tasmania and the Northern Territory. AUR conducts regular training in barracks on Tuesday nights and on various weekends each month, as well as periods of field training throughout the year at the Murray Bridge Training Area near Murray Bridge, Woodside and Cultana Training Area near Port Augusta. The regiment, supported by the Western Australia University Regiment, also conducts the second module of the Reserve General Service Officer course twice a year.

== Link to the Royal Irish Regiment ==
The regiment maintains an alliance with the Royal Irish Regiment, which has its origins in the regiment's historical link with the Royal Ulster Rifles. As a symbol of this alliance, members of AUR previously wore a rifle green patch behind their hat badge.

== AUR Pipes and Drums ==
The AUR Pipes and Drums band was formed by the Regiment's first commanding officer in 1949. The commanding officer chose to form a pipe band based on his wartime experience of military bands sustaining heavy casualties whilst performing the role of stretcher bearers. The band's original instruments, 16 sets of bagpipes, and its blue and white Napier kilts appeared in mysterious circumstances in mid-1949. Their first appearance in public was as part of a parade along King William Street on 21 January 1952. In 1992 the band performed at the Edinburgh Military Tattoo. It was disbanded on 1 February 2010.

In 2009, ex Pipe Major, Ernest Dowler was awarded the Order of Australia Medal for his services to music. In 2011, another former member of the AUR Pipes and Drums, Greg Bassani, was awarded a Medal of the Order of Australia (OAM) in the Queens Birthday Honours list for his services to music. The regimental quick march is Highland Laddie.

== Structure ==
The regiment currently consists of the following subunits:

- Regimental Headquarters (Adelaide);
  - Advanced Training Company (Adelaide);
  - Beersheba Company (Adelaide and NT);
