= Bullecourt Barracks =

- Adamstown, New South Wales

Site information
- Type: Military base
- Owner: Department of Defence
- Controlled by: Australian Army
- Open to the public: No
- Condition: Active

Location
- Coordinates: 32°56′29″S 151°43′35″E

Site history
- Built: 1956
- In use: Yes

Garrison information
- Garrison: 14 Combat Engineer Squadron; 111 Workshop Company; 16 Transport Squadron; Australian Army Band Newcastle

Bullecourt Barracks (historically the Adamstown Rifle Range and Newcastle Multi User Depot) is an Australian Army base located at Adamstown, a suburb of Newcastle, New South Wales, Australia. It is named in recognition of local units' historic associations with the battles at Bullecourt in France during World War I. The base primarily hosts elements of the 5th Brigade, an Army Reserve formation.

== History ==
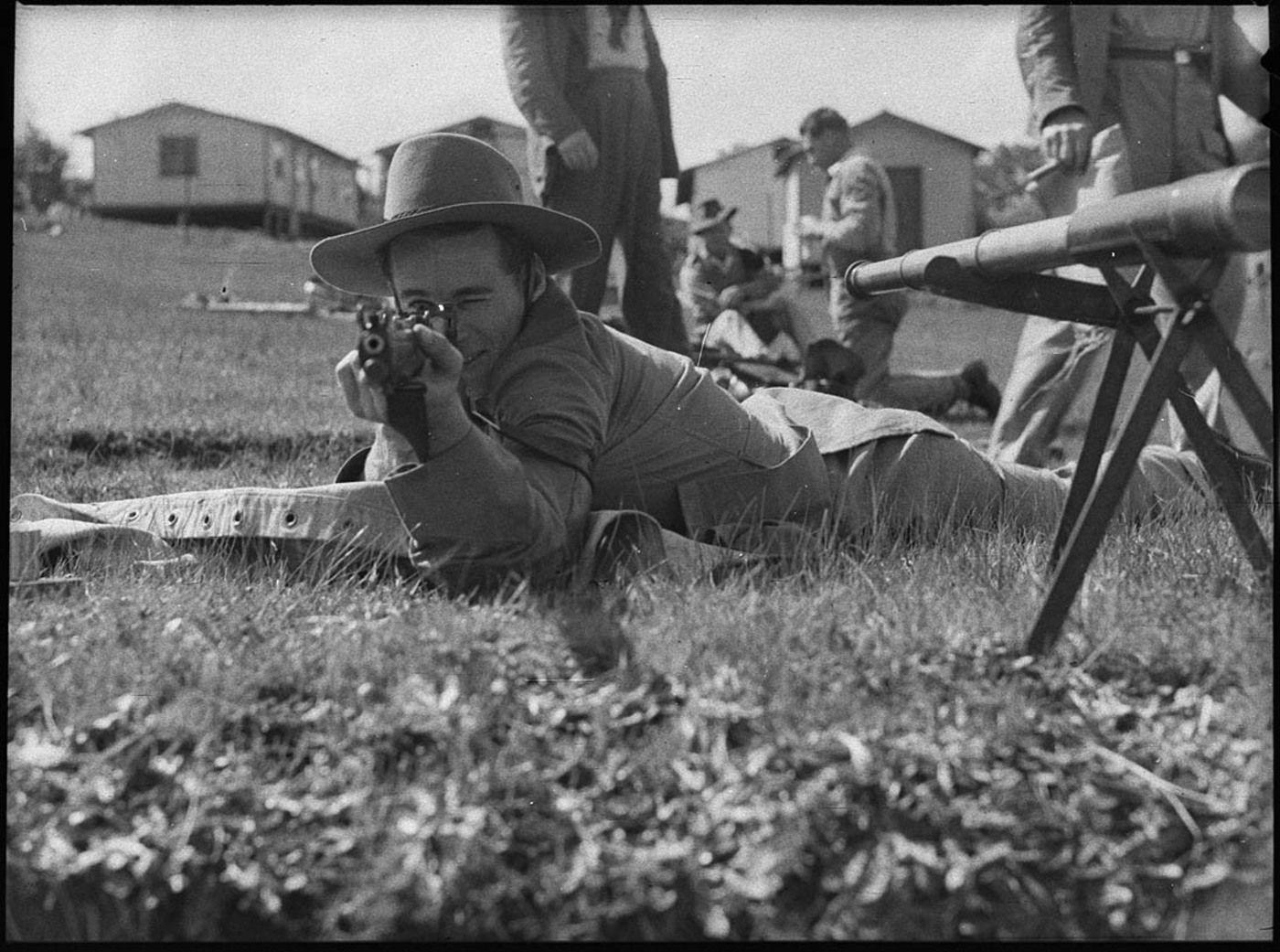
Shooting at the Adamstown Rifle Range in 1950

In 1900 there were four volunteer rifle companies in the Newcastle area, but no dedicated range facility for training. A site was selected near Adamstown to address this requirement, with the new military rifle range opening on 16 November 1901. The occasion was marked with a shooting competition, attended by representatives of various military units and civilian rifle clubs from across the Hunter region.

It was clear that the range was inadequate to meet demand for such facilities by 1913, prompting calls for the Department of Defence to invest in expansion. The Department acquired approximately 231 acres (93 ha) of land on 17 June 1913 to accommodate expansion of the range to 21 targets, firing mounds, a magazine shelter and on-site accommodation at a cost of £5,397. During its operation, the Adamstown rifle range trained local militia as well as soldiers who served with the 1st and 2nd Australian Imperial Force.

Urban expansion in the 1930s prompted the Greater Newcastle Council to lobby the Defence Department in 1938 to close the rifle range, which now presented a safety risk. Premier of New South Wales Jim McGirr directed the range's closure in 1948 after the Defence Department committed to upgrading a range at Stockton which had been built during World War II. It was proposed the land be redeveloped as a university campus. When the closure eventually occurred on 23 March 1953 however, the land was retained for the Army. It was announced that a permanent depot would be built the same year to accommodate expansion of the Citizen Military Forces. The depot opened in 1956 with the 34th Heavy Anti-Aircraft Regiment, Royal Australian Artillery as a tenant.

Following further expansion of the depot, the base was renamed the Newcastle Multi User Depot in 1995. These expansions allowed the relocation of a company of the University of New South Wales Regiment, joining the 8th Combat Engineer Regiment that was raised at the depot. At a ceremony on 2 December 2003, the depot was officially renamed Bullecourt Barracks by then Brigadier Greg Melick.

Between 2004 and 2005, a housing estate for Newcastle-based personnel was developed by Defence Housing Australia on a 5.2 ha (13 acres) parcel of land immediately north of Bullecourt Barracks. The estate was officially named in honour of Clarence Jeffries, VC on 26 April 2005.

In 2012, a contingent of more than 100 troops from the 8th Brigade deployed from Bullecourt Barracks as part of the Regional Assistance Mission to Solomon Islands. A restructure of the Australian Army under Plan Beersheba took place between 2014 and 2017. During this period, the 8th Engineer Regiment remained headquartered at Bullecourt Barracks.

In 2016, the Hunter Business Review reported that the base supported ten units, 50 regular soldiers and 1500 reservists. With a new tasking, the 8th Brigade began transferring and amalgamating its subordinate units into the 5th Brigade during 2017. This led to the disestablishment of the 8th Engineer Regiment and a further re-organisation. Non-headquarters elements of the re-organised 5th Engineer Regiment (including the 14th Combat Engineer Squadron) and 5th Combat Service Support Battalion remained at Bullecourt Barracks.

== List of units ==
2nd Division

- 5th Brigade

- 2nd/17th Battalion, Royal New South Wales Regiment

- C Company

- 5th Engineer Regiment

- 14th Combat Engineer Squadron

- 5th Combat Service Support Battalion

- 111 Workshop Company
- 16th Transport Squadron

- Australian Army Band Newcastle

Australian Army Cadets

- Headquarters 21 Army Cadet Battalion
- 211 Army Cadet Unit Newcastle

Australian Air Force Cadets

- 316 (City of Lake Macquarie) Squadron
- 321 (City of Newcastle) Squadron

== See also ==
- List of Australian military bases
