= 8th Engineer Regiment (Australia) =

Australian Army engineer unit

- Active: 1995–2017
- Country: Australia
- Branch: Australian Army
- Role: Engineer support
- Part of: 8th Brigade
- Garrison/HQ: Adamstown, New South Wales

Insignia
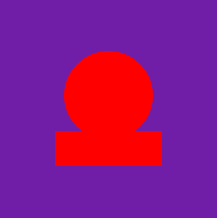
- Unit colour patch

The 8th Engineer Regiment was a reserve engineer regiment of the Australian Army. Originally raised as the "8th Combat Engineer Regiment" in 1995, the unit provided support during the 2000 Sydney Olympics and the APEC Australia 2007, and was headquartered at Bullecourt Barracks, Adamstown, New South Wales, where it formed part of the 8th Brigade.

== History ==
In late 2013, the regiment was reorganised when one sub-unit – the 102nd Construction Squadron – was transferred to 8 CER from the 21st Construction Regiment, following the decision to disband that unit. The regiment subsequently assumed the designation of the "8th Engineer Regiment". At the time, it also consisted of the 6th and 14th Combat Engineer Squadrons, drawing lineage from several units that fought during the First and Second World Wars.

Throughout 2017, the regiment transitioned from the 8th Brigade to the 5th Brigade and in November 2017, the regiment was amalgamated into the 5th Engineer Regiment. As a part of this amalgamation, the regiment's 14th Combat Engineer Squadron was transferred intact, based at Adamstown, while the 6th Combat Engineer Squadron was reduced to a troop at Dundas, while the 102nd Construction Squadron also became a troop, subordinate to the 101st Construction Squadron.
