= 7th Signal Regiment (Australia) =

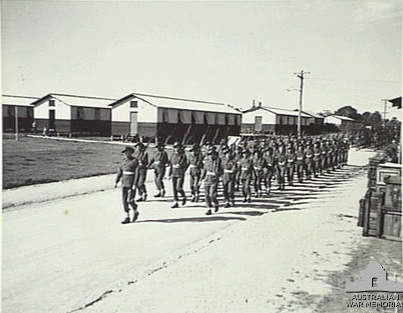
- Troops of the Australian Special Wireless Group marching through their camp at Kalinga, Queensland, in July 1945.
- Active: 1940–present
- Country: Australia
- Branch: Australian Army
- Type: Signals intelligence
- Size: ~ 250 personnel
- Part of: 1st Division
- Garrison/HQ: Cabarlah, Queensland
- Engagements: World War II; Malayan Emergency; Confrontation; Vietnam War; Rwanda; Sinai; Somalia; Iraq; Afghanistan

The 7th Signal Regiment is an Australian Army signals intelligence (SIGINT) unit. Drawing lineage from the Australian Special Wireless Group (ASWG), which was raised during World War II, the regiment's history includes service in the Allied campaigns in Greece, on Crete and in Syria before taking part in the fighting against the Japanese in New Guinea. After the war, the ASWG was redesignated the 101 Wireless Regiment, deploying detachments overseas during the Malayan Emergency and Confrontation. In the mid-1960s, the unit became the 7th Signals Regiment, taking part in the Vietnam War. The unit is currently part of the 1st Division.

== History ==
=== World War II ===
The regiment traces its lineage back to a unit that was raised as part of the Second Australian Imperial Force (2nd AIF) during World War II. The Australian Special Wireless Group (ASWG) was formed as signals intelligence group on 18 May 1942 at Bonegilla, Victoria. With a war establishment of 1,000 personnel, the ASWG was raised out of a smaller unit, No. 4 Australian Special Wireless Section, which had been raised at Seymour, Victoria, in 1940 and had served in Egypt, Greece, Crete, and Syria, before being withdrawn back to Australia after Japan's entry into the war.

From August 1942, women were also recruited into the ASWG. Personnel undertook four months of training, before being formed into sections and deployed to various locations in remote parts of Australia or in New Guinea. The ASWG was headquartered at Kalinga, in Brisbane during the war and eventually 11 field sections were raised in total. By the end of the war, the ASWG had around 4,300 personnel. Parts of the group were later absorbed into the Central Bureau.

=== Post 1945 ===
After the conclusion of hostilities, the ASWG was relocated to Cabarlah, Queensland, 12 miles (19 km) north of Toowoomba. In February 1947, it was redesignated the "101 Wireless Regiment", with an authorised strength of two officers and 22 other ranks. Over the next two years, the regiment was expanded and between 1951 and 1959, the regiment deployed a detachment to Malaya in support of Commonwealth forces deployed during the Malayan Emergency. During the early 1960s, the regiment deployed to Borneo during Confrontation, intercepting and decoding Indonesian communications.

A further name change came in December 1964, when it became the 7th Signal Regiment, subsequently deploying a troop – 547 Troop – as part of Australia's contribution to the Vietnam War. The unit continues to exist within the Australian Army today as part of the 6th Brigade, providing an electronic warfare capability. From the 1990s, the regiment provided support for Australian Army deployments to Rwanda, Multinational Force, Somalia, East Timor, Bougainville, Solomon Islands, Iraq and Afghanistan. It is currently based at Borneo Barracks, at Cabarlah and has an establishment of around 250 personnel. The majority of its personnel are members of the Royal Australian Corps of Signals. In June 1995, then Governor-General Bill Hayden was the Reviewing Officer for the regiment's 48th birthday parade held at Borneo Barracks, Cabarlah.

In mid-2024 the 7th Signal Regiment's 138th Signal Squadron was transferred to the newly-established Cyber Command, where it forms part of the Cyber Forces Group alongside units that were previously part of the Royal Australian Navy and Royal Australian Air Force. When the 6th Brigade was disbanded in December 2024 the 7th Signal Regiment was temporarily assigned to the direct command of the 1st Division. It will transfer to the 10th Brigade in late 2025.

== Structure ==
As of 2016, the 7th Signal Regiment comprised the following sub-units:

- 71st Squadron
- 72nd Squadron
- 73rd Squadron
- 138th Squadron
- Operations Support Squadron

== See also ==
- Signals intelligence in modern history#Australian Army
