= Edwin Tivey =

Australian Army general (1866–1947)

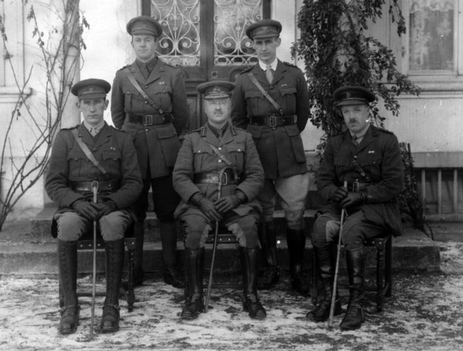
- An outdoors group portrait of the staff of the 8th Australian Infantry Brigade, whose GOC, Brigadier General Tivey, sits in the centre, France, December 1917.
- Born: 19 September 1866; Inglewood, Victoria, Australia
- Died: 19 May 1947 (aged 80); Toorak, Victoria, Australia
- Burial place: Brighton Cemetery, Australia
- Military career
- Allegiance: Colony of Victoria; Australia
- Branch: Victorian Military Forces; Citizens Military Force
- Service years: 1889–1928
- Rank: Major General
- Commands: 2nd Cavalry Division (1921–26); 5th Infantry Division (1918–19); 8th Infantry Brigade (1915–18); 5th Light Horse Brigade (1915); 3rd Light Horse Brigade (1911–14)
- Conflicts: Second Boer War; First World War; Western Front; Battle of Fromelles; Battle of Polygon Wood; Battle of Amiens; Battle of St Quentin Canal
- Awards: Companion of the Order of the Bath; Companion of the Order of St Michael and St George; Distinguished Service Order; Colonial Auxiliary Forces Officers' Decoration; Mentioned in despatches (7)

Major General Edwin Tivey, CB, CMG, DSO, VD (19 September 1866 – 19 May 1947) was an Australian stockbroker and a senior officer in the Australian Army during the First World War.
