= The Army Museum Bandiana =

Coordinates: 36.1463°S 146.9168°E

Australian Army Museum Bandiana
- Former name: Royal Australian Army Ordnance Corps (RAAOC) General Museum
- Established: 1976
- Location: Gaza Ridge Barracks, Anderson Road, South Bandiana, VIC, 3691
- Type: Military Museum
- Collection size: The Largest Military Museum Collection in Australia
- Owner: The Australian Defence Force
- Parking: Free onsite parking
- Website: https://armymuseumbandiana.com.au/

The Army Museum Bandiana is dedicated to collecting, housing, displaying military equipment, weapons and vehicles associated with the Australian Army. It is the largest and most diversified military museum in Australia The museum is based within Australian Army base property, at the Gaza Ridge Barracks, near Wodonga South Bandiana, in the Australian state of Victoria. The museum houses over 150 military vehicles, as well as artillery, infantry weapons, uniforms, and militaria - including material brought back from war, as well as items retrieved from battlefields.

== History ==
The museum was originally established in 1972, as the Royal Australian Army Ordnance Corps Centre at Bandiana. As the collection grew in size, it was moved to a large shed in 1976. In 1996 the collection was enlarged through mergers with various smaller collections, and then renamed The Army Museum at Bandiana. In 2009, Australian military historian and journalist John Laffin's collection of memorabilia was added to the collection.

== Contributing units ==
The museum holds collections derived from many Australian army units, including the Royal Australian Corps of Transport, Royal Australian Army Chaplains Department, Royal Australian Army Ordnance Corps, 2/23rd Australian Infantry Battalion, Royal Australian Army Medical Corps, Royal Australian Army Dental Corps, Royal Australian Electrical & Mechanical Engineers, Australian Army Catering Corps, Australian Army Psychology Corps, Royal Australian Army Nursing Corps, Australian Women's Army Service, Australian Service Nurses, Army Apprentices, and the United Nations. It also include in its entirety, the John Laffin Collection.
