= Claude Ewen Cameron =

Australian Army officer

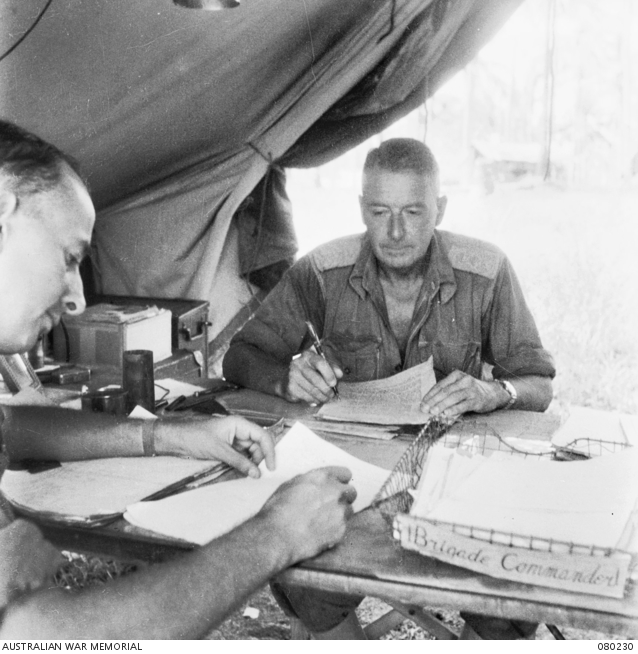
- Brigadier Claude Cameron in July 1944
- Born: 13 September 1894; Balmain North, New South Wales
- Died: 10 September 1982 (aged 87); Thornleigh, New South Wales
- Military career
- Allegiance: Australia
- Branch: Australian Army
- Service years: 1915–19; 1923–45
- Rank: Brigadier
- Service number: NX110380
- Commands: 2nd Brigade (1944); 8th Brigade (1940–44); 18th Battalion (1933–40)
- Conflicts: First World War; Second World War
- Awards: Military Cross & Bar; Medal of the Order of Australia; Mentioned in Despatches; Efficiency Decoration

Brigadier Claude Ewen Cameron, MC & Bar, OAM, ED (13 September 1894 – 10 September 1982) was an Australian Army officer. Cameron fought during the First World War with the Australian Imperial Force, serving at Gallipoli, Menin Road and Amiens. He was awarded the Military Cross for his actions during the Battle of Amiens, and won a Bar to the award for actions on 3 October 1918 during the Hundred Days' Offensive. He took command of the 18th Battalion in July 1933 and was promoted to a temporary colonel in 1940, taking command of the 8th Brigade. In August 1942, Cameron volunteered to serve in the Second Australian Imperial Force and, under his command, the 8th Brigade fought in the Huon Peninsula campaign. Cameron relinquished command of the brigade in August 1944 and took command of the 2nd Brigade from until December 1944. He was transferred to the Reserves on 27 February 1945 and mentioned in despatches for his service in New Guinea. Cameron returned to civilian life and was appointed managing director of Sydney Harbor Ferries in 1951. He retired in 1964. Cameron was awarded the Medal of the Order of Australia in 1980 and died two years later.

== Early life ==
Cameron was born on 13 September 1894 in the Sydney suburb of Balmain North. He was the second child of Anglican clergyman Ronald John Cameron and his wife Lilly Wafford. Cameron was educated at the Sydney Church of England Grammar School between 1908 and 1912. He was initially employed by Dalgety & Co. as a junior clerk.

== First World War ==
Cameron served in the Australian Militia before the war, having initially been involved in the senior cadets. Following the outbreak of the First World War, Cameron volunteered for overseas service, enlisting in the Australian Imperial Force on 18 March 1915. He was promoted to sergeant two months later while serving with the 20th Battalion. Cameron fought during the Gallipoli Campaign between August and December 1915 and was made company sergeant major in February 1916 while in Egypt following the battalion's withdrawal from the peninsula. Transferred to France with the 20th Battalion, Cameron was commissioned on 16 August 1916. He received a shoulder wound near Flers on 15 November and was promoted to lieutenant the next day. After being evacuated to England, Cameron arrived back on the front on 1 September 1917, but received a thigh wound during the Battle of Menin Road on 20 September. Cameron was again evacuated to England and returned to the 20th Battalion's lines two months later.

Now a company commander, Cameron attacked an enemy strongpoint with an NCO, killing several German soldiers and capturing two machine guns on 8 August 1918 during the Battle of Amiens. Cameron also held his assigned positions with 12 men against a German assault. For these two actions, Cameron was awarded the Military Cross (MC), the citation for which reads:

On the morning of 8th August, 1918, in the attack east of Villers Bretonneux, near Amiens, he, with an N.C.O., captured a post held by twelve enemy and two machine guns, which was holding up the advance and causing casualties. Again, on 11th August, when the company advanced at Rainecourt, he being on his objective with only twelve 1 men consolidating under heavy fire from machine guns and a 77mm. at point-blank range, he did excellent work in supervising his company and organising the defence of his position. Throughout the whole operations he showed great courage and initiative.

During an attack on 3 October near Beaurevoir in one of the final actions fought by the AIF during the war, Cameron took charge of forward units of his battalion and consolidated the flank of the brigade assault, for which he received a Bar to his MC. The bar's citation states the following:

During the attack on 3rd October, 1918, between the Beaurevoir line and the Beaurevoir village, north of St. Quentin, under very heavy fire, he displayed great courage and coolness, took charge of the battalion, and led them to the position in the Torrens Canal, where he formed a defensive flank. His quick action and calm confidence enabled the battalion to hold the position gained until other troops passed through in a later attack.

With the war soon over due to the armistice of 11 November 1918, Cameron returned to Australia in April 1919 and was demobilized on 2 June.

== Inter-war years ==
Cameron began farming and later became a pay clerk at Sydney Ferries Limited in 1923. Cameron also rejoined the Militia the same year and was promoted to captain the next year. He married Aline Vindin on 14 August 1924 at St. James's Church of England. In 1929, he was promoted to major. Cameron became a lieutenant colonel in July 1933 and commanded the 18th Battalion until 1940. Cameron became an accountant at Sydney Ferries Limited in 1934. He was also the mayor of the municipality of Kuring-gai in 1936.

== Second World War ==
In May 1940, he became the commander of the 8th Brigade. Made a temporary brigadier in January 1941, Cameron was called up on 10 March and he subsequently led the brigade during garrison duties in Western Australia where they were deployed to respond in the event of a Japanese invasion. He transferred to the Second Australian Imperial Force in August 1942.

The 8th Brigade landed at Finschafen in January 1944, and took part in the final stages of the Huon Peninsula campaign. During the pursuit of the Japanese towards Madang, the brigade killed 734 Japanese and took 48 prisoners, losing three killed and five wounded, before reaching Madang in April 1944. Two months later, Cameron relinquished command and transferred to the 2nd Brigade in New South Wales from then to December 1944. Cameron was transferred to the Reserve of Officers on 27 February 1945 as an honorary brigadier. He was also mentioned in despatches for New Guinea service.

== Civilian life ==
Cameron returned to Sydney Ferries Limited, where he was the managing director of the Sydney Harbour Transport Board from 1951 to his 1964 retirement. In late 1945, he became the manager of the Port Jackson & Manly Steamship Company, becoming its general manager in 1949. Cameron was the honorary colonel of the 17th/18th Battalion, North Shore Regiment between 1951 and 1960. In retirement he moved to Bayview, New South Wales, where he engaged in recreational pursuits such as fishing and golf. He also became involved with the Returned Services League of Australia. He was awarded the Medal of the Order of Australia in 1980 and died two years later at Thornleigh, New South Wales.
