= 1st/15th Royal New South Wales Lancers =

Australian Army unit

- Cap badge of the 1st/15th Royal New South Wales Lancers
- Active: 1956 – present
- Country: Australia
- Branch: Army
- Type: Line cavalry
- Role: Light cavalry
- Size: One regiment
- Part of: 5th Brigade
- Garrison/HQ: Lancer Barracks, Parramatta
- Motto: Tenax in Fide (Steadfast in Faith)
- March: Quick – El Abanico; Slow – Scipio
- Anniversaries: 3 March – Regimental birthday
- Battle honours: Belmont, Sari Bair, Second Gaza, Sattelberg, Balikpapan

Commanders
- Current commander: LTCOL Greg Barter
- Colonel-in-Chief: King Charles III (Colonel-in-Chief, RAAC)
- Colonel of the Regiment: Brigadier Phillip Bridie, AM, ADC

Insignia
- Unit colour patch

The 1st/15th Royal New South Wales Lancers is an active Australian Army Reserve Light Cavalry regiment. The regiment has its headquarters at Lancer Barracks in Parramatta, a suburb in Western Sydney, New South Wales. Lancer Barracks is the oldest Military Barracks on mainland Australia and dates from 1819.

== History ==
The regiment dates back to the formation of the Sydney Light Horse Volunteers in January 1885. It took its current name in 1956 when the 1st Royal New South Wales Lancers and the 15th Northern River Lancers amalgamated, initially being equipped with Matilda tanks. The 1st/15th RNSWL carries the former regiments' battle honours and has 31 collective theatre and battle honours, including those from the Boer War, First World War and Second World War.

The regiment has recently been equipped with Hawkei Protected Mobility Vehicles - Light (PMV-L) and Mercedes G-wagen Surveillance and Reconnaissance vehicle (SRV), having previously used Bushmaster Protected Mobility Vehicle - Medium (PMV-M) in their role as a Light Cavalry (Reconnaissance) regiment. The last of the previously equipped armoured vehicles, the M113A1 APC was handed over in 2006.

The Regimental Band of the 1st/15th Royal New South Wales Lancers is one of the few Army regimental bands still in existence. The Band was formed in 1891 and has served with the regiment since, making it the oldest military Band in Australia. The Lancer Band consists of Army Musicians who perform for Regimental functions, public events, and other Army Ceremonial tasks.

== Theatre and Battle honours ==
- Boer War: South Africa 1899–1902
- First World War: Anzac, Defence of Anzac, Suvla, Sari Bair, Gallipoli 1915, Rumani, Magdhaba-Rafah, Egypt 1915–17, Gaza-Beersheba, El Mughar, Nebi Samwil, Jerusalem, Jaffa, Jericho, Jordan (Es Salt), Jordan (Amman), Megiddo, Nablus, Palestine 1917–18
- Second World War: South West Pacific 1943–45, Finchaffen, Sattleberg, Wareo, Liberation of Australian New Guinea, Wareo-Lakona, Gusika-Fortification Point, Borneo, Balikpapan, Milford Highway.

== Current organisation ==
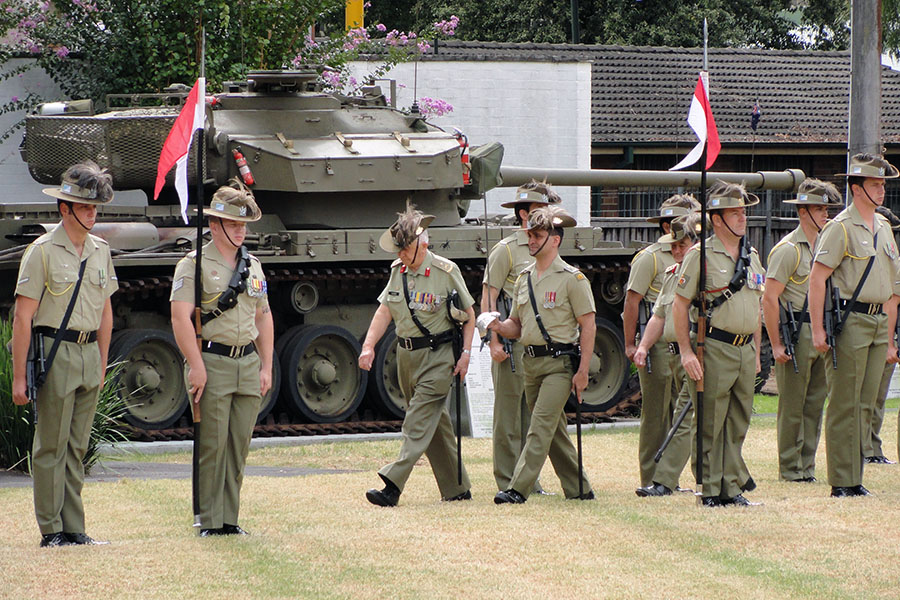
1/15th Royal NSW Lancers on parade at Lancer Barracks, Parramatta

The regiment is currently located as follows:

- Regimental Headquarters — Lancer Barracks, Parramatta
- The Lancer Band — Lancer Barracks, Parramatta
- A Squadron — Holsworthy Barracks, Moorebank
- B Squadron — HMAS Harman, Canberra
- C Squadron — Holsworthy Barracks, Moorebank

== Lancers' Museum ==
The regimental museum was started in 1957, and is currently hosted at its own building in Linden House, Parramatta. Its collection includes equipment, uniforms, weapons and vehicles used by the Lancers along its history.

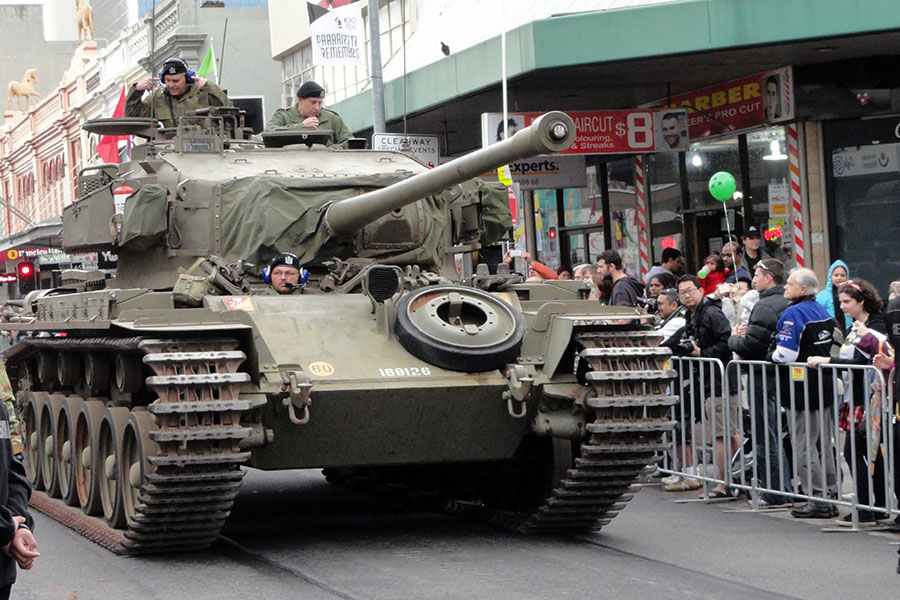
The Lancers Museum Centurion tank parading through Parramatta August 2014

The vehicles on display include:

- Covenanter bridgelayer tank
- Matilda close support tank (with 3 inch howitzer)
- Bren Gun carrier
- Staghound armoured car
- Ferret Mk1 and Mk2 scout cars
- Centurion main battle tank
- Daimler Dingo scout car
- Land Rover 4x4 truck with 106mm recoilless gun
- Austin Champ 4x4 truck

== Alliances ==
- United Kingdom – 1st The Queen's Dragoon Guards
- United Kingdom – The Light Dragoons

== Gallery ==
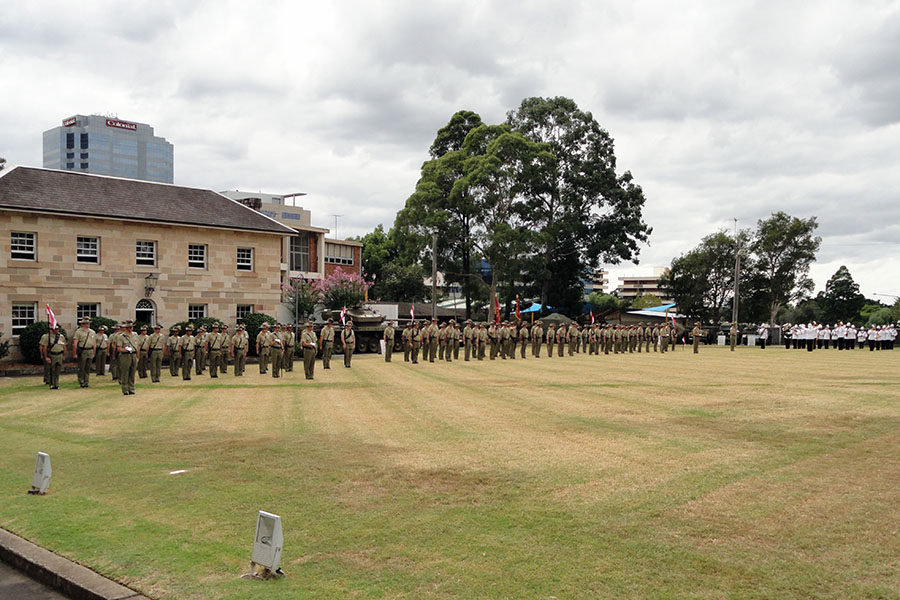
1/15th Royal NSW Lancers on parade at Lancer Barracks, Parramatta

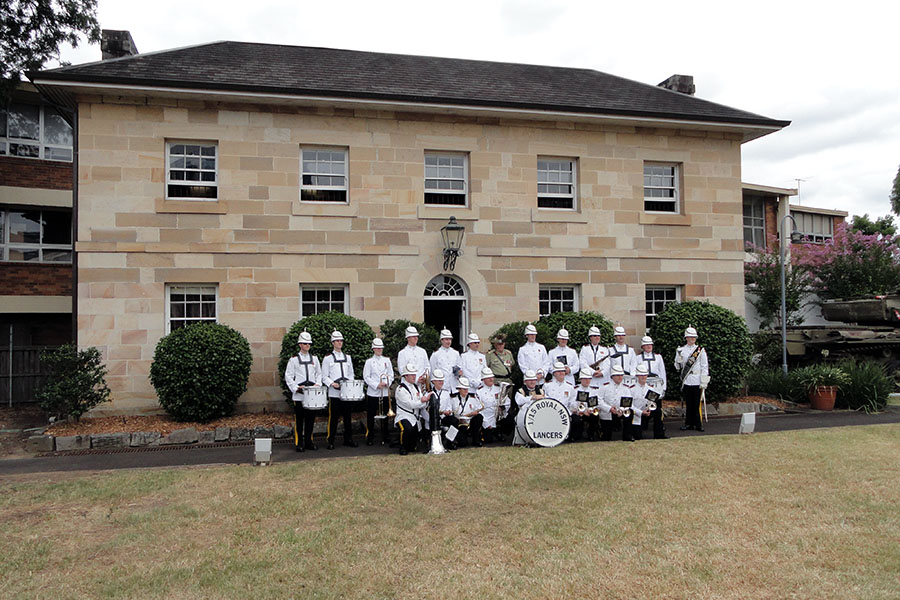
The regimental band in front of Linden House (The regimental museum)

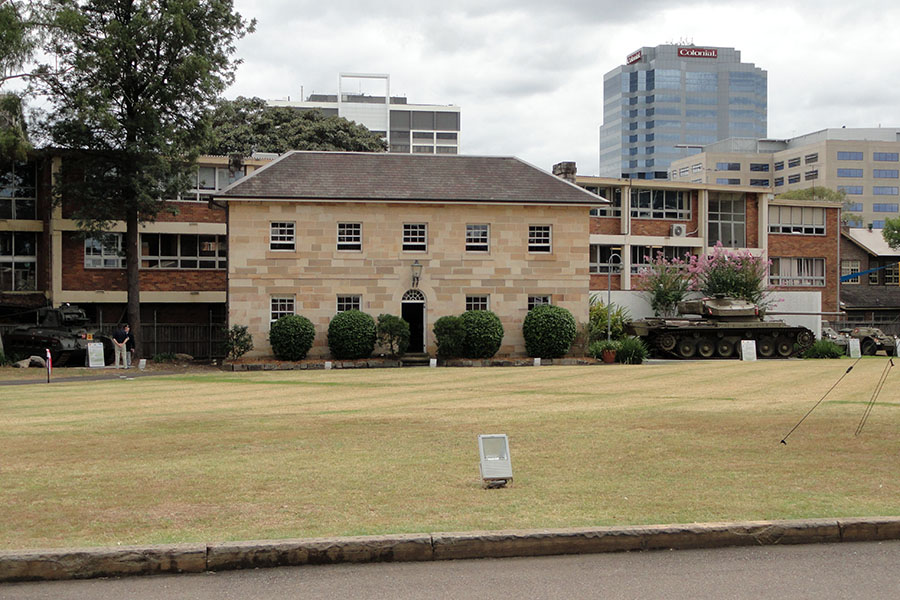
The regimental museum - Linden House

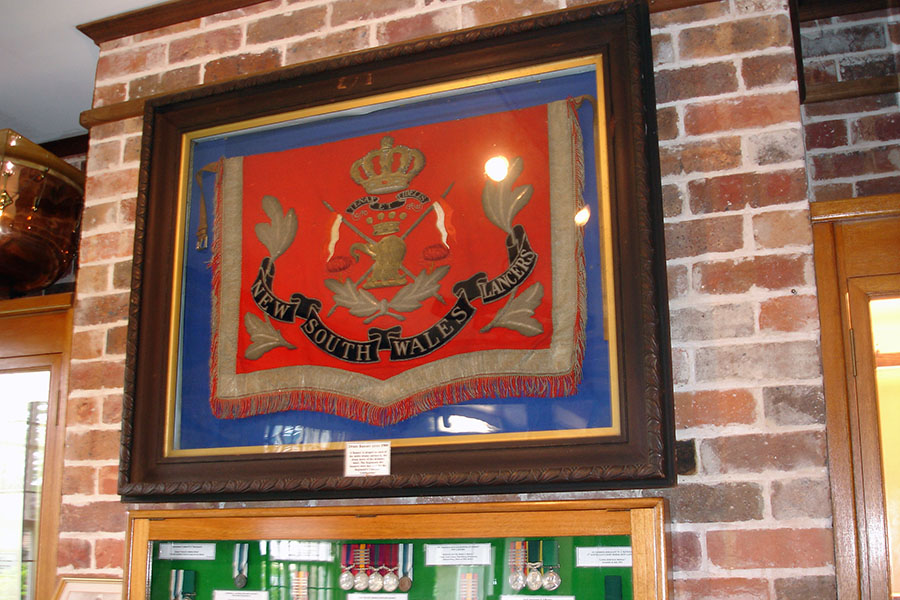
Inside the Lancers Museum

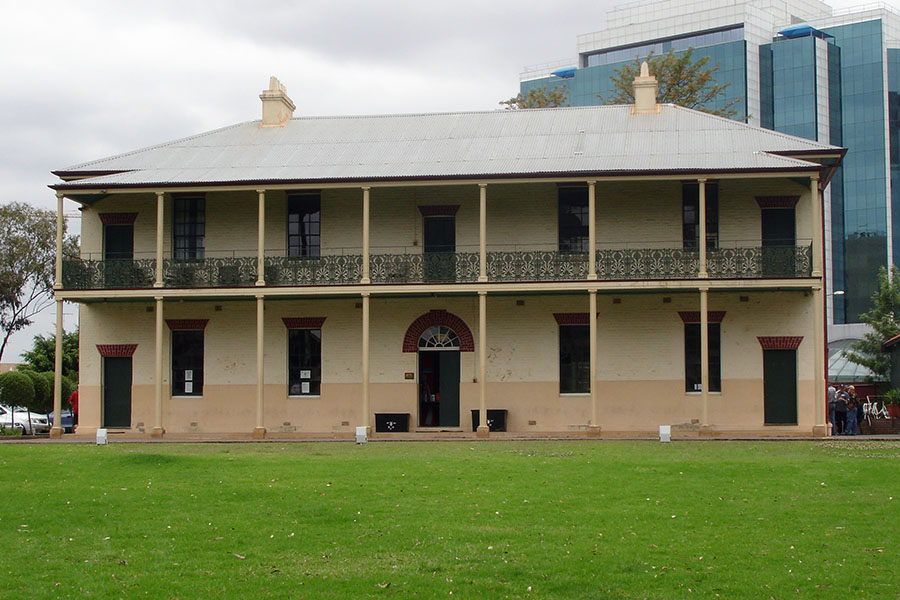
The original barracks building

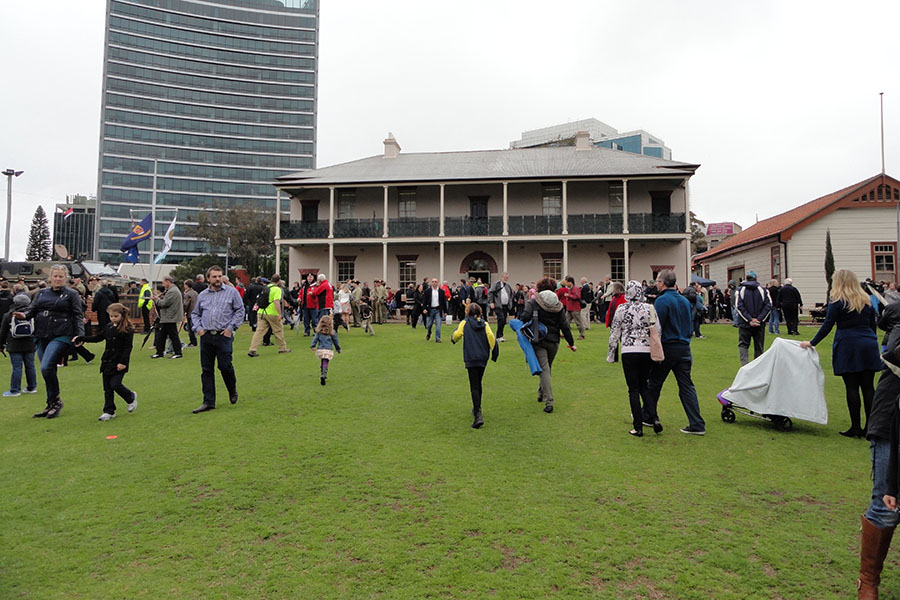
Barracks open for inspection after the August 2014 parade through Parramatta

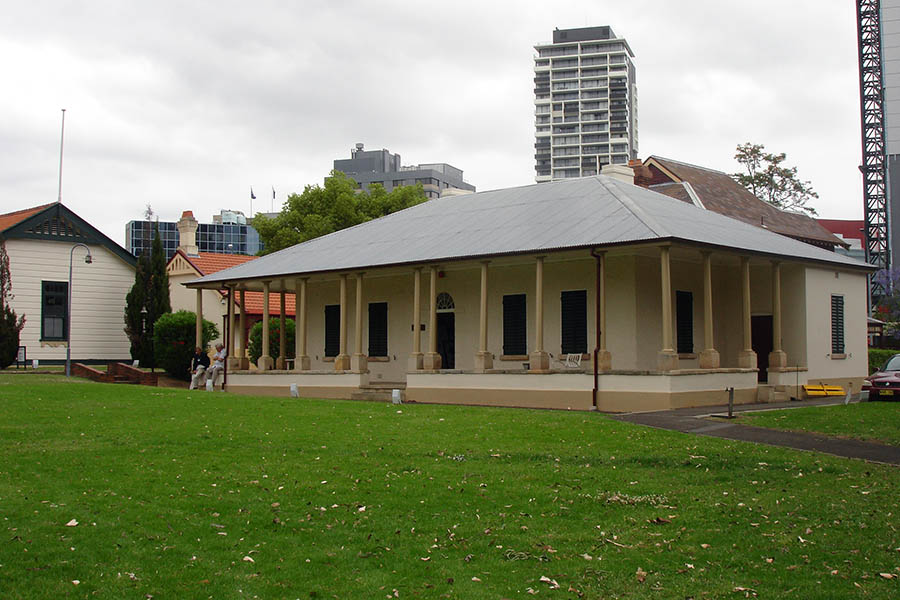
"Bobs hall"

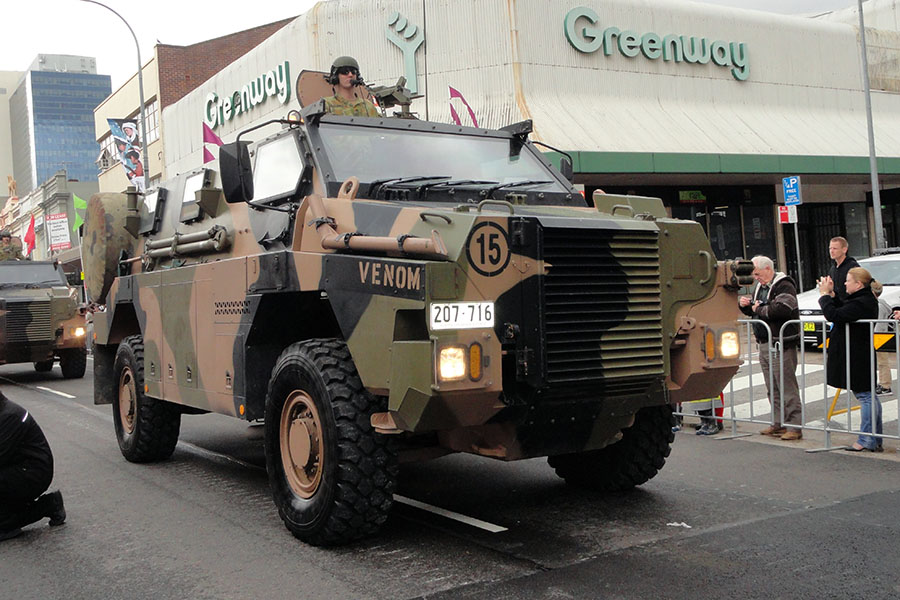
Bushmasters, the regiment's latest vehicles, parading through Parramatta 2014

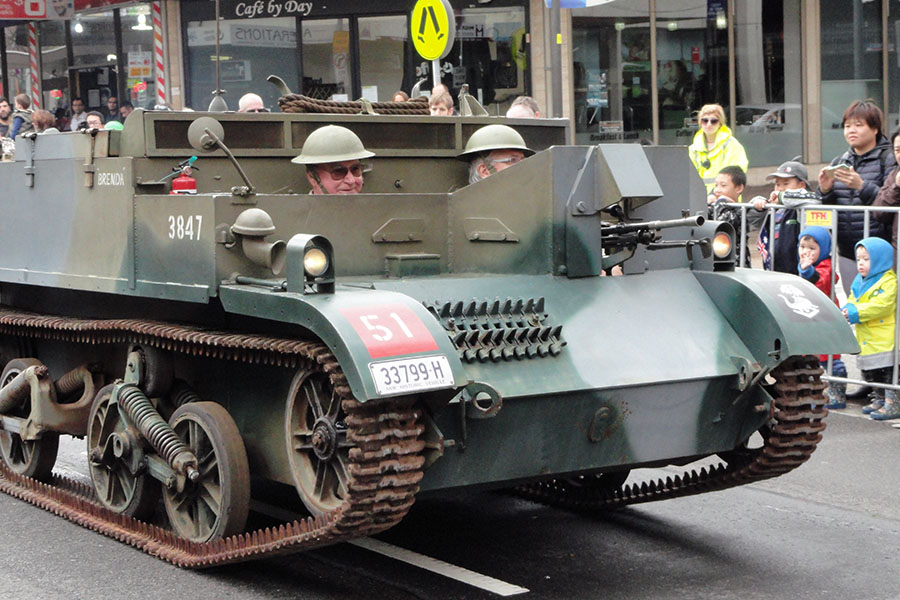
"Brenda", the museums Bren Gun Carrier, parading through Parramatta 2014

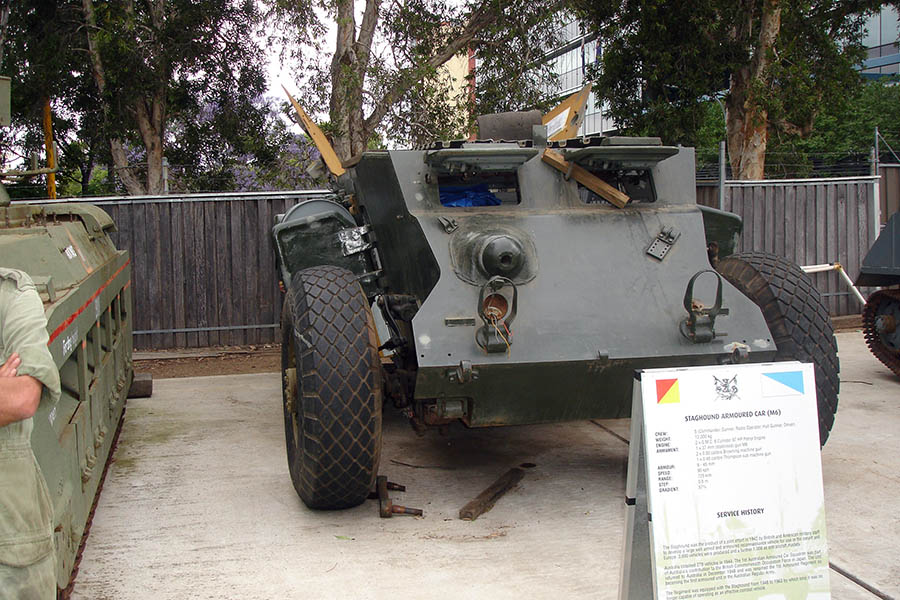
Staghound armoured car under restoration in the museums collection 2008

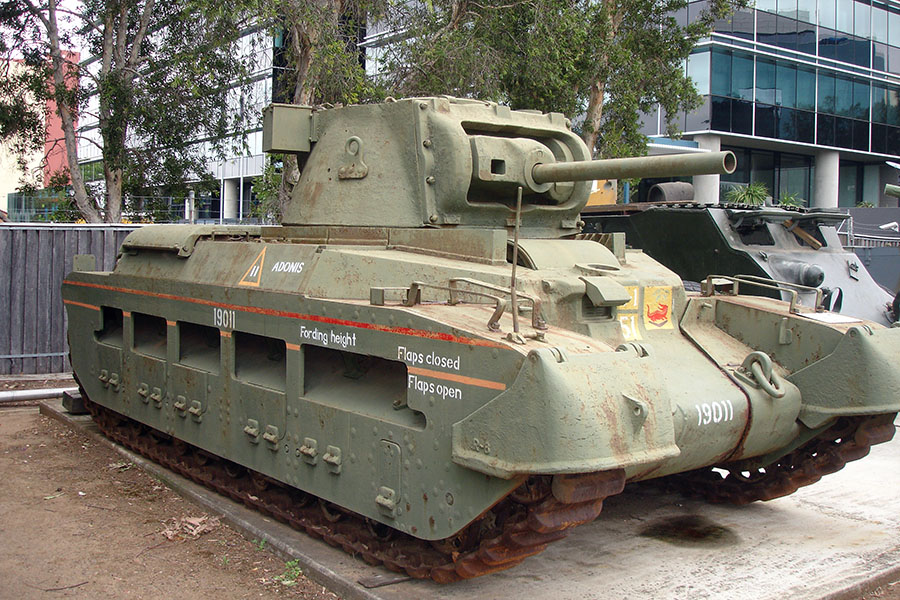
Matilda tank "Adonis"

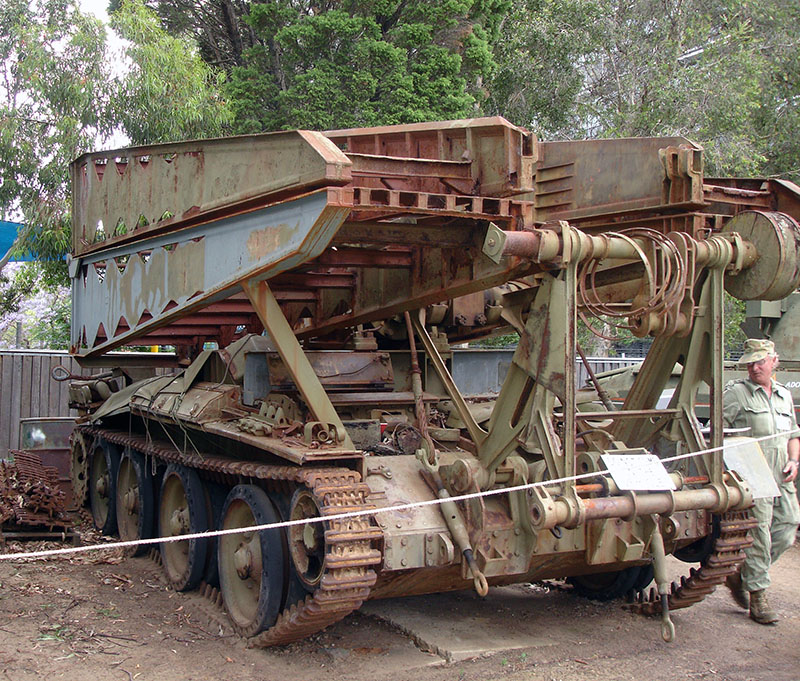
Covenanter Tank Bridgelayer in museum collection

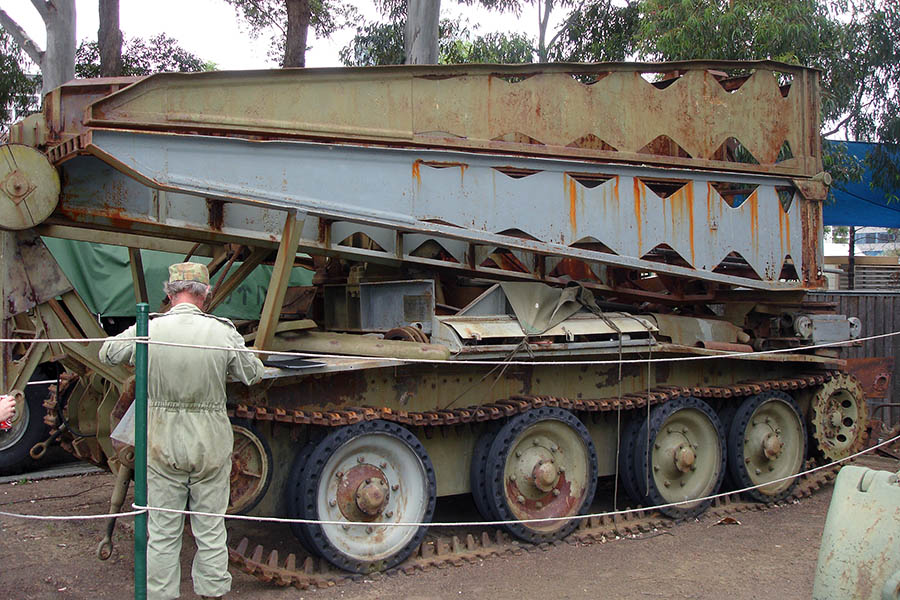
Covenanter tank bridgelayer, one of only 2 known left in existence

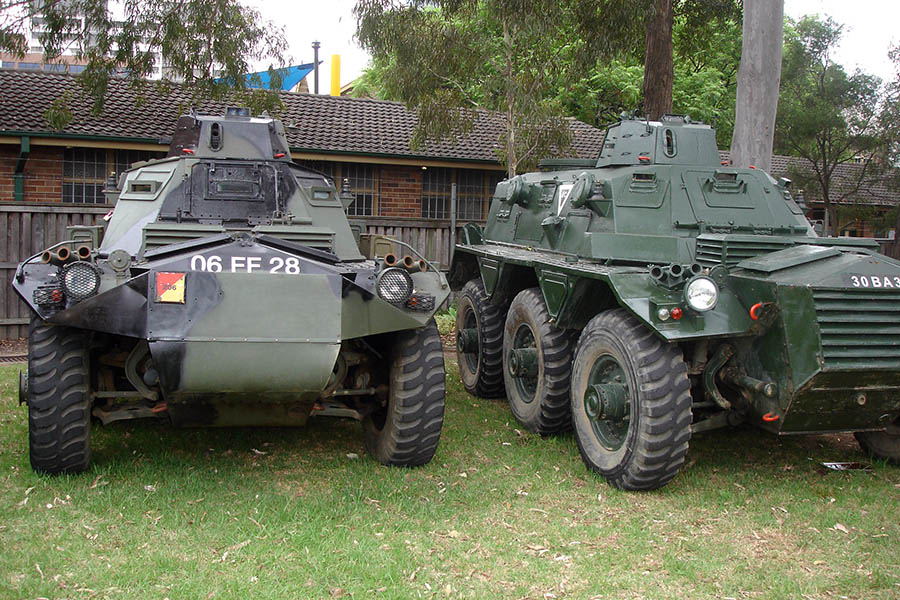
Saracen armoured cars on display

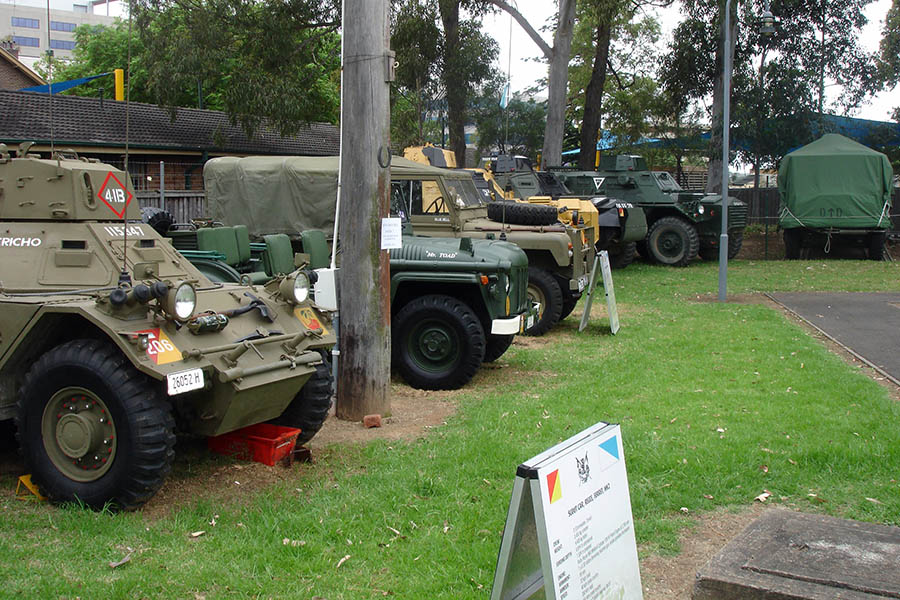
Vehicles on display at the museum

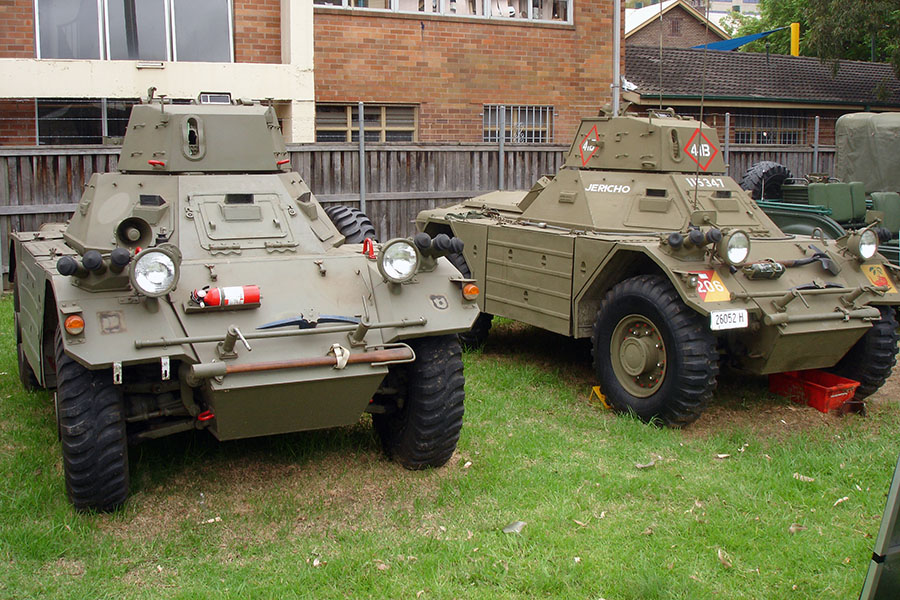
Ferret armoured cars
