= Defence Establishment Myambat =

Australian Defence Force munitions storage facility

- Myambat Ammunition Depot
- Denman, New South Wales in Australia

Site information
- Type: Munitions storage
- Owner: Department of Defence

Location
- Location in New South Wales
- Coordinates: 32°22′14″S 150°37′6″E

Site history
- In use: 1938 – present

Defence Establishment Myambat, also referred to as the Myambat Ammunition Depot, is an Australian Defence Force munitions storage facility located approximately 10 kilometres (6.2 mi) west of Denman in the Upper Hunter Valley of New South Wales, Australia.

The facility was established in 1938, and has been in use since that time. A factsheet published by the Department of Defence in 2012 stated that "the facility stores all forms of ammunition used by the Australian Defence Forces". In addition, its demolition range is used by private companies to test explosives intended for use in mines. At this time the entire site covered an area of 17 square kilometres (6.6 sq mi).

In 1991 the Parliament of Australia's Joint Standing Committee on Public Works recommended that 21 earth covered storehouses be constructed at Myambat so that particularly hazardous types of ammunition could be stored in facilities which met NATO standards; the Canberra Times reported that this recommendation meant that the works were "almost certain" to take place. 34 explosive storehouses were eventually constructed during the early 1990s by the private company Spantech. A 2014 submission to a parliamentary inquiry provided by the Department of Defence described Defence Establishment Myambat as "Australia’s largest and most comprehensive ammunition storage depot".

As of 2015, the facility was to be expanded and upgraded as part of the works being undertaken to accommodate the Royal Australian Air Force's Lockheed Martin F-35A Lightning II fighter aircraft. This will include building new earth-covered bunkers, as well as a storage facility for the F-35s' defensive countermeasures. The 2016 Defence White Paper also allocated funding to expand the facilities at Myambat and increase the stockpiles of ammunition stored there.

== See also ==
- List of Australian military bases
