= 5th Engineer Regiment (Australia) =

- Active: 1995–present
- Country: Australia
- Branch: Army
- Type: Royal Australian Engineers
- Role: Combat engineers, construction engineers
- Part of: 5th Brigade, 2nd Division
- Garrison/HQ: Holsworthy, Australia
- Motto: Ubique – Everywhere
- Anniversaries: 18 June (Waterloo Dinner)

Commanders
- Current commander: Lieutenant-Colonel Robert Tot

Insignia
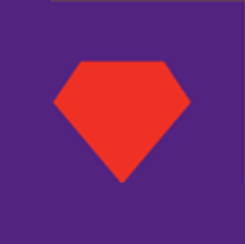
- Unit colour patch
- Abbreviation: 5 ER

5th Engineer Regiment is a Reserve unit of the Royal Australian Engineers. Originally raised as the "5th Combat Engineer Regiment" in 1995 from the 4th Field Engineer Regiment, it is based in Holsworthy, Sydney, with one of its sub-units based at the multi-user depot HMAS Harman, in Canberra and another at Orchard Hills and Dundas. Some of the unit's sub-units draw lineage from the 4th and 5th Field Companies, which were raised for service during World War I.

In late 2013, the regiment was reorganised, when two sub-units – 101st Construction Squadron and the Littoral and Riverine Survey Squadron – were transferred from the 21st Construction Regiment, following the decision to disband that unit. The regiment subsequently assumed the designation of the "5th Engineer Regiment". The LRSS was transferred to the School of Military Engineering in January 2016, and as of 2017 was being utilised to evaluate several new capabilities as well as running several courses and camps.

In November 2017, the regiment subsumed the disbanded 8th Engineer Regiment. This resulted in the transfer of the 6th and 14th Combat Engineer Squadrons, and the 102 Construction Squadron to 5 ER. As a part of this amalgamation, the 14th Combat Engineer Squadron was transferred from 8 ER intact, to be based at Adamstown, while the 6th Combat Engineer Squadron was reduced to a troop at Dundas, and the 102nd Construction Squadron also became a troop, subordinate to the 101st Construction Squadron.

== Structure ==
- Regimental HQ
  - 4 Combat Engineer Squadron
    - 4 Troop (Canberra)
    - 5 Troop (Canberra)
    - 7 Troop (Canberra)
  - 5 Combat Engineer Squadron
    - 1 Troop (Orchard Hills)
    - 2 Troop (Holsworthy)
  - 14 Combat Engineer Squadron
    - 3 Troop (Adamstown)
    - 6 Troop (Dundas)
    - 9 Troop (Adamstown)
  - 101 Construction Squadron
    - Plant Troop (Holsworthy)
    - Construction Troop (Holsworthy)
    - Resources Troop (Holsworthy)

The regiment's primary role is to provide engineer support to the 5th Brigade, including contributing to the brigade's generation of Battle Group Waratah in support of the 7th Brigade under Plan Beersheba.
