= Kokoda Barracks, Tasmania =

Coordinates: 41°10′1.7″S 146°21′24.6″E

Kokoda Barracks is an army barracks in Devonport on the northwest coast of Tasmania. The Barracks is the home of the 160 Transport Troop, 44th Transport Squadron which is a sub-unit of the 2nd Force Support Battalion. Kokoda is also home to the Army and Australian Air Force Cadets living in the area.
