= 8th Brigade (Australia) =

Formation of the Australian Army

- Active: 1912–present
- Country: Australia
- Branch: Australian Army
- Type: Training
- Size: 6 university regiments
- Part of: Forces Command
- Headquarters: Timor Barracks, Sydney
- Engagements: World War I: Western Front; World War II: Huon Peninsula campaign

Commanders
- Notable commanders: Edwin Tivey; Claude Cameron; Maurice Fergusson

Insignia
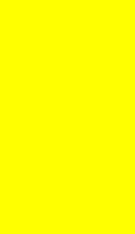
- Unit colour patch 1912–1944

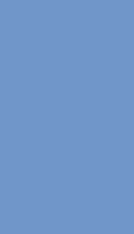
- 1944–1945

8th Brigade is an Australian Army Reserve training formation. It is headquartered in Sydney, and has subordinate units in various locations around New South Wales and the rest of Australia. These units are tasked with delivering basic and initial employment training to Reserve soldiers.

The brigade was first formed in 1912, before being re-raised in Egypt as part of the First Australian Imperial Force in early 1916, for service during World War I. As part of the 5th Division, the brigade subsequently fought in numerous battles on the Western Front in France and Belgium between 1916 and 1918. During the interwar years, the brigade was re-raised within the part-time Militia, headquartered in Sydney. Later, during World War II, the brigade undertook garrison duties in Australia during 1942–1944, before taking part in the Huon Peninsula campaign, during which they helped to capture Madang.

In the post-war period, the brigade was re-formed as a combined arms formation as part of the 2nd Division until it was converted into a training brigade in 2017–2018.

In 2024, the brigade was transferred to Forces Command as a result of wider Army Force Structure reorganisation following the release of the Defence Strategic Review.

== History ==
The 8th Brigade traces its origins to 1912, when it was formed as a Militia brigade as part of the introduction of the compulsory training scheme, assigned to the 2nd Military District. At this time, the brigade's constituent units were located around Glebe, Forest Lodge, East Balmain, Rozelle, Annandale, Leichhardt, Haberfield and Drummoyne. Just prior to the outbreak of the war, the brigade consisted of the 25th, 26th, 29th and 31st Infantry Battalions.

During World War I, the brigade was re-raised in 1916 as part of the First Australian Imperial Force, when the AIF was being expanded in Egypt following the Gallipoli Campaign and prior to its deployment to the Western Front. Assigned to the 5th Division, the brigade comprised newly formed battalions that had recently arrived in Egypt. During this time, the brigade consisted of four infantry battalions: the 29th, 30th, 31st and 32nd. It was an all-states brigade with the 29th being recruited mainly from Victoria, the 30th being drawn from New South Wales, the 31st from Queensland and 32nd from South Australia and Western Australia. Fire support was provided by the 8th Machine Gun Company (which later formed part of the 5th Machine Gun Battalion), the 8th Light Trench Mortar Battery, and the 8th Field Ambulance.

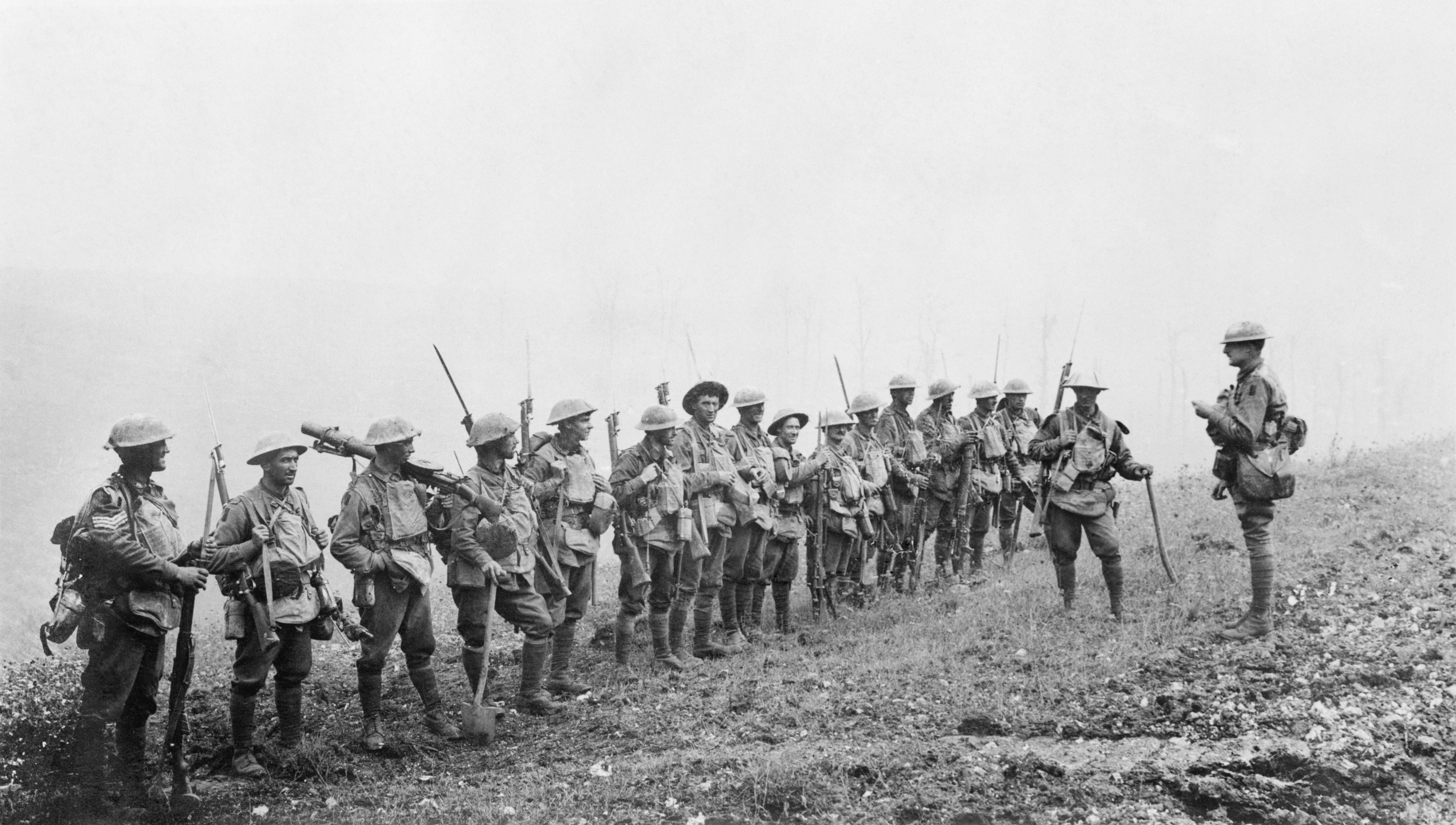
A platoon commander from the 29th Battalion addresses his troops, 8 August 1918

Under the command of Brigadier General Edwin Tivey for most of the war, the brigade took part in numerous battles including: the Battle of Fromelles, the First Battle of Bullecourt, the Third Battle of Ypres, the German spring offensive, the Battle of Amiens and the Hundred Days Offensive. In the final stages of the war, due to heavy casualties, one of the brigade's infantry battalions – the 29th – was disbanded to provide reinforcements for the other three infantry battalions. Following the conclusion of hostilities, the brigade's constituent units were demobilised in early 1919 and the soldiers repatriated to Australia, although the AIF would not be formally disbanded until 1921.

During the interwar years, the brigade was re-raised as Militia formation in 1921, headquartered in North Sydney and assigned to the 1st Division. The brigade's role at this time was to defend the Newcastle area. In 1922, the brigade consisted of five infantry battalions: the 2nd, 17th, 18th, 30th, and 51st. By 1928, the 51st Battalion had been removed from the brigade's order of battle. The Sydney Scouts (later Sydney University Regiment) was also assigned to the brigade around this time.

In World War II, the 8th Brigade was employed in defence of the Australian mainland for the majority of the war. After being called up for full time service in December 1941, the brigade concentrated at Wallgrove and began training. In March 1942, the 8th Brigade relieved the 9th Brigade, which was defending the northern beaches area around Sydney. In July 1942, however, the brigade was transferred to Western Australia. Initially, the 8th Brigade was based around Gingin, to defend the coastline between Lancelin and Trigg, but later they were redeployed to Geraldton. Throughout 1943, the brigade moved several times, firstly to Moora and then Dandaragan and then to Mingenew. Jungle training was undertaken a Collie, before the brigade returned to Wallgrove in September 1943. In October 1942, the brigade took part in the largest anti-invasion exercise undertaken by the Army during the war, playing the role of a Japanese division that landed around Dongara, in Western Australia. A period of leave followed, after which the brigade concentrated on the Atherton Tablelands prior to its assignment to the 3rd Division with which it would be committed to the fighting in the New Guinea in January 1944.

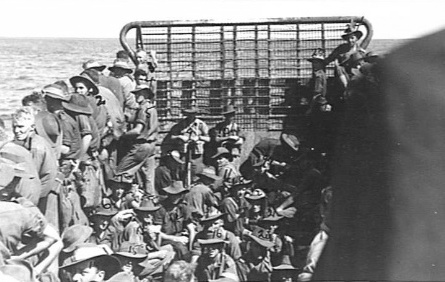
Troops from the 8th Brigade being ferried to Sio, New Guinea in 1944

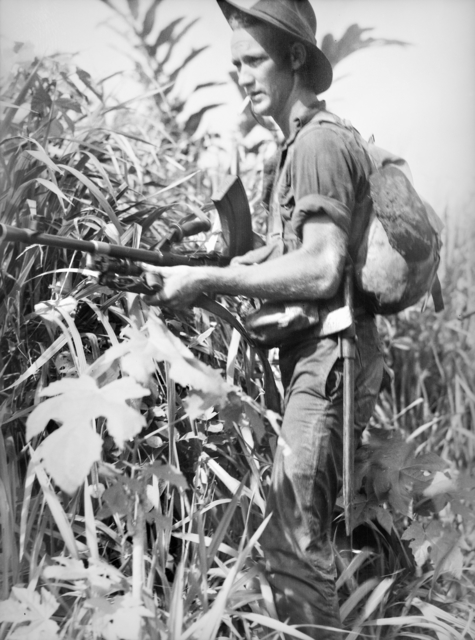
A soldier from the 35th Battalion on patrol around Alexishafen, May 1944

Under the command of Brigadier Claude Cameron, the brigade landed at Finschhafen and then helped to secure the Huon Peninsula, during which time it was involved in the Battle of Sio and the capture Madang in 1944–1945. During this time, the brigade contained three infantry battalions: the 4th, 30th and 35th, all from New South Wales. Following the capture of Madang, the 8th Brigade carried out patrolling operations from there out to Sepik, including the Watam – Hansa Bay – Ramu River area in support of the 6th Division, which was operating around Aitape–Wewak. In June, the brigade moved to Wewak, and the following month relieved the 19th Brigade in the Wirui Creek – Mandi area. They carried out patrols in this area until the end of the war. Throughout the war, the brigade was assigned to a number of different divisions including the 1st, 4th, 2nd, 5th and finally, the 6th. In the brigade's final campaign it was commanded by Brigadier Maurice Fergusson, who assumed command in August 1944.

Following the war, the wartime military was demobilised and the part-time Citizens Military Force was formed in 1948. Around this time, the brigade was re-raised and assigned to the 2nd Division as part of Eastern Command, and consisting of several New South Wales-based infantry battalions. Throughout the post war period, the brigade was reorganised several times with the introduction of national service in the 1950s and 60s, and was briefly designated as the 8th Task Force, before returning to its old designation in 1981. Following the reorganisation of the Army Reserve in 1987, the brigade became a combined arms formation with units and personnel from various corps providing support to two infantry battalions. In 1991, the brigade consisted of the 2nd/17th Battalion, Royal New South Wales Regiment and 41st Battalion, Royal New South Wales Regiment, and was supported by the 7th Field Regiment and the 14th Field Squadron. The 8th Combat Engineer Regiment was raised as part of the brigade in 1995.

A 2000 parliamentary inquiry noted that the brigade was at 32 percent of its operational strength. This placed it in a similar position to the 2nd Division's other brigades, all of which were well below 50 percent of operational staffing. Historian Ian Kuring has also written that in 2000, it was assessed that the brigade was at around 40 per cent authorised strength. In 2013, the brigade's engineer support was reorganised as the 8th Engineer Regiment, and was expanded to include two combat engineer squadrons, the 6th and 14th, and a construction squadron, the 102nd. Under Plan Beersheba, from mid-2015, the 8th Brigade was tasked with generating a battalion-sized combined arms battle group in support of the Regular Army's 7th Brigade as part of the Army's force generation cycle. This battle group was designated Battle Group Waratah.

Following its conversion into a training brigade in 2017–2018, the 8th Brigade – with its headquarters at Dundas, New South Wales – transferred its combat and combat support units, such as engineers, to other formations with the majority being transferred the 5th Brigade. The 8th Brigade then became responsible for the management of training delivered to Reserve soldiers through six different university regiments. This includes basic recruit training, officer cadet courses, and initial employment training (IET) courses for a variety of corps including infantry, armoured, engineers, artillery and transport.

On June 30 2024 in a ceremony at Randwick Barracks, the 8th Brigade transferred from the 2nd Division to Forces Command. The change was the result of the wider Army Force Structure reorganisation following the release of the Defence Strategic Review. The change means Forces Command is now responsible for individual and collective training across the Army, including Army Reserve training.

== Organisation ==
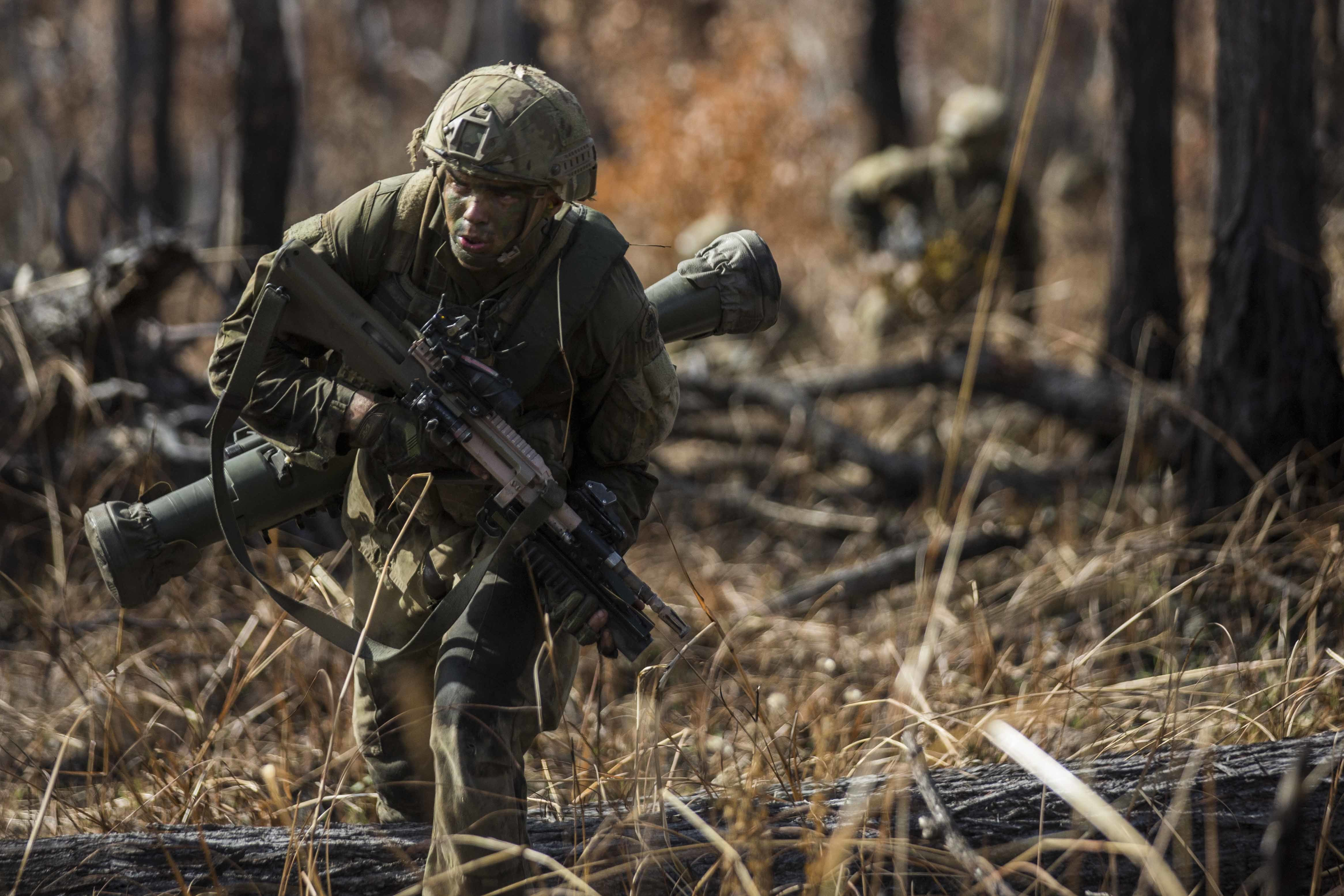
An 8th Brigade soldier during Exercise Southern Jackaroo in 2016

As of 2023 the 8th Brigade consists of:

- Headquarters 8th Brigade. Located in Dundas (Sydney).
- Adelaide Universities Regiment (South Australia)
- Melbourne University Regiment (Victoria)
- Queensland University Regiment (Queensland)
- Sydney University Regiment (New South Wales)
- University of New South Wales Regiment (New South Wales)
- Western Australia University Regiment (Western Australia)

== Bibliography ==
- Austin, Ron (1997). Black and Gold: The History of the 29th Battalion, 1915–1918. McCrae, Victoria: Slouch Hat Publications. ISBN 0-646-31650-8.
- Australian Military Forces (1912). The Military Forces List of the Commonwealth of Australia, 1 January 1912. Melbourne, Victoria: Government Printer. OCLC 221429471.
- Australian Military Forces (1914). Staff and Regimental Lists of the Australian Military Forces, 1st January 1914. Melbourne, Victoria: Government Printer. OCLC 681165642.
- Bean, Charles (1941). The Australian Imperial Force in France, 1916. Official History of Australia in the War of 1914–1918. Vol. III (12th ed.). Canberra, Australian Capital Territory: Australian War Memorial. OCLC 220623454.
- Dean, Peter (2014). "Conclusion: 1943 and Beyond". Australia 1943: The Liberation of New Guinea. Port Melbourne, Victoria: Cambridge University Press. pp. 285–291. ISBN 978-1-107-03799-1.
- Dexter, David (1961). The New Guinea Offensives. Australia in the War of 1939–1945, Series 1—Army. Volume VI (1st ed.). Canberra: Australian War Memorial. OCLC 2028994.
- Grey, Jeffrey (2008). A Military History of Australia (3rd ed.). Melbourne: Cambridge University Press. ISBN 978-0-521-69791-0.
- Joint Standing Committee on Foreign Affairs, Defence and Trade (2000). From Phantom to Force: Towards a More Efficient and Effective Army. Canberra: Parliament of Australia. ISBN 0-642-36628-4.
- Kuring, Ian (2004). Redcoats to Cams: A History of Australian Infantry 1788–2001. Loftus, New South Wales: Australian Military History Publications. ISBN 1-876439-99-8.
- Likeman, Robert (2003). Men of the Ninth: A History of the Ninth Australian Field Ambulance 1916–1994. McCrae, New South Wales: Slouch Hat Publications. ISBN 978-0-95797-522-4.
- McKenzie-Smith, Graham (2018a). The Unit Guide: The Australian Army 1939–1945, Volume 2. Warriewood, New South Wales: Big Sky Publishing. ISBN 978-1-925675-146.
- McKenzie-Smith, Graham (2018b). "The Japanese Landing at Dongara – 24–28 October 1942". Sabretache. LIX (3 (September)): 61–63. ISSN 0048-8933.
- Mionnet, Yvonne (2004). History of the 1st Division: From Gallipoli to Brisbane, 5 August 1914 to 5 August 2004. OCLC 224412941.
- Palazzo, Albert (2001). The Australian Army: A History of its Organisation 1901–2001. Melbourne, Victoria: Oxford University Press. ISBN 978-0-19-551506-0.
