= Wivenhoe Barracks =

Australian Defence Force barracks in Tasmania

Wivenhoe Barracks is an Australian Defence Force barracks in central Burnie, Tasmania.

Wivenhoe Barracks is home to the following units:

- 64 Regional Cadet Unit, Army Cadet Unit

Until 2018 Wivenhoe Barracks was home to part of A Coy, 12th/40th Battalion, Royal Tasmania Regiment. It has since relocated to Youngtown Barracks.
