= Borneo Barracks =

- Cabarlah, Queensland

Site information
- Type: Military base
- Owner: Department of Defence
- Controlled by: Australian Army
- Open to the public: No
- Condition: Active

Location
- Coordinates: 27°26′38″S 151°59′11″E

Site history
- Built: 1941
- In use: Yes

Garrison information
- Garrison: 7th Signal Regiment; Defence Force School of Signals, Electronic Warfare Wing

Borneo Barracks is an Australian Army base located at Cabarlah in the Darling Downs region of Queensland, Australia. It is named in honour of the Borneo campaign of World War II, in which Australian forces played a pivotal role. The base is home to the Army's Electronic Warfare elements.

== History ==
There are records of military training occurring around Cabarlah as early as 1900. and during World War I. A training camp for up to 1,000 militia was established in 1941 at the current site, west of the New England Highway.

During World War II, the camp expanded significantly, becoming an important training facility for the First Australian Army, headquartered in nearby Toowoomba. In addition to the Australian staff college established in 1944, the Cabarlah camp hosted the Army's Military Tactics School, Administration School, Gas School and Transport School, as well as quarters for the Australian Women's Army Service.

Although the Chief of the General Staff, Lt. General John Northcott had compared the Staff College at Cabarlah to those of Camberley and Quetta, its removal or relocation was already being considered by 1946. After the war, the Australian Special Wireless Group (ASWG) relocated to Cabarlah to form the 101 Wireless Regiment, which was renamed as the 7th Signal Regiment in 1964. The base was key in developing Australia's signals intelligence, and later Electronic Warfare capabilities.

Despite continuous operation as a hub for these capabilities, the base's small size, maintenance cost and relative isolation have been considered as reasons for its closure in several Defence reviews since 2006. These reviews have resulted in debate, opposition to its closure and lobbying by the local community. As of 2026, there are no confirmed plans to dispose of Borneo Barracks.

In 2020 the Department of Defence invited tenders to construct new facilities at Borneo Barracks to support an upgrade of the Army's Bushmaster Protected Mobility Vehicle fleet.

== List of units ==
1st Division

- 7th Signal Regiment

Defence Force School of Signals

- Electronic Warfare Wing

== See also ==
- List of Australian military bases
