= Oakleigh Barracks =

Coordinates: 37.913°S 145.107°E

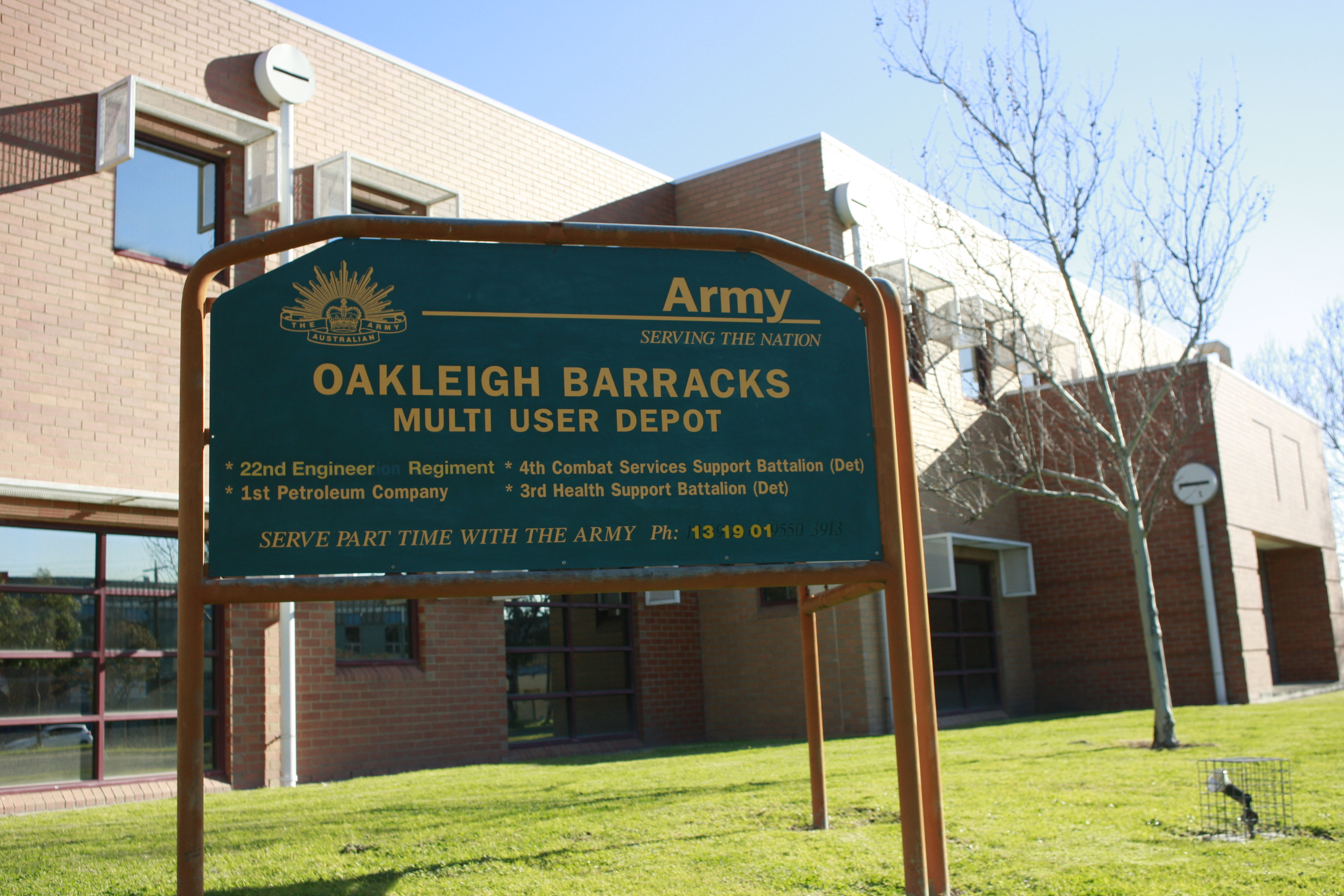
Oakleigh Barracks signage

Oakleigh Barracks is an installation of the Australian Army. It is located in the suburb of Oakleigh South. It is situated on North Road, close to Huntingdale Railway Station.

Address: 1318 North Road, Oakleigh South, Victoria, 3167.

Currently, it is host to the following Units - Sub units:

- 22nd Engineer Regiment Royal Australian Engineers (RAE)
- 17th Combat Service Support Brigade
- 3rd Health Support Battalion - 6th /10th Health Support Company Royal Australian Army Medical Corps (RAAMC), Royal Australian Army Nursing Corps (RAANC), Royal Australian Army Dental Corps (RAADC), Australian Army Psychology Corps (AA Psych), Royal Australian Army Ordnance Corps (RAAOC), Royal Australian Army Corps of Transport (RACT)
- 302nd Army Cadet Unit

The barracks also houses two heritage listed Honour Rolls of people who served in World War I.

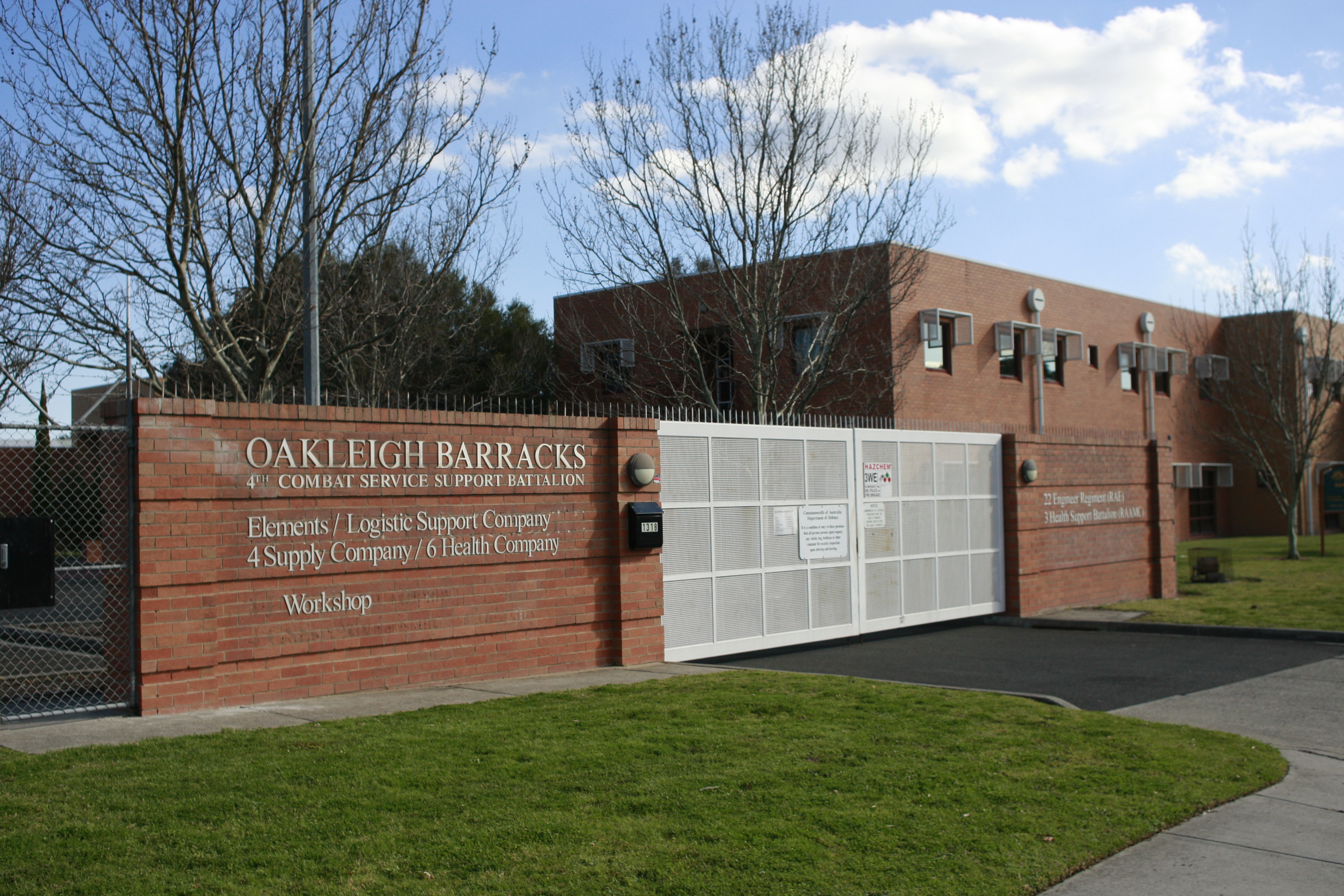
Oakleigh Barracks main entry
