= Lancer Barracks =

Military facility in Parramatta

- Sydney, Australia
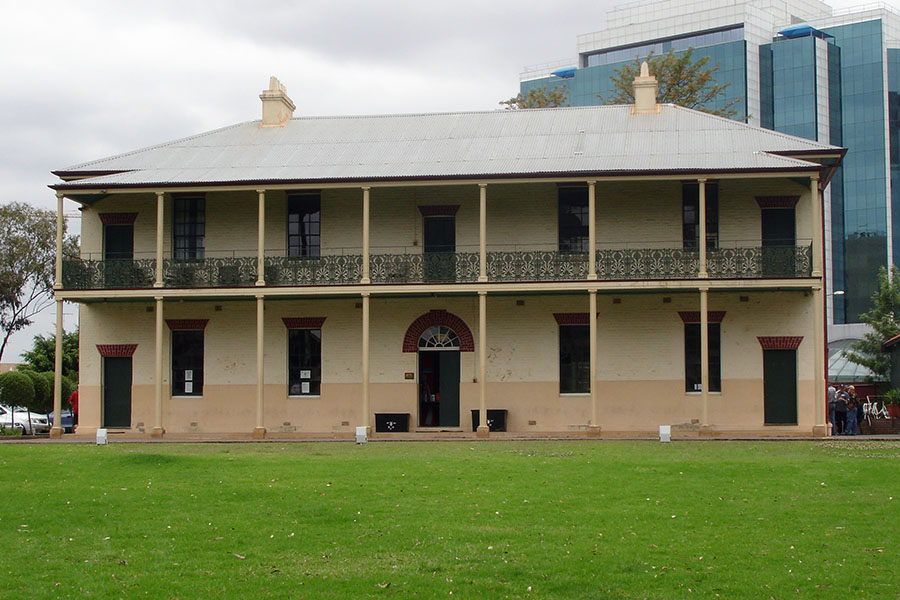
- The main barracks block

Site information
- Owner: Australian Army
- Open to the public: Yes

Location
- Coordinates: 33.817413°S 151.007445°E

Site history
- Built: 1818–1820
- Built by: LT John Watts
- In use: 1820–current
- Materials: Sandstone

Garrison information
- Garrison: 1st/15th Royal New South Wales Lancers

Lancer Barracks is a historic military facility and grounds in Parramatta, New South Wales, Australia. It is the longest continuously operational military facility in Australia since colonial settlement.

Lancer Barracks is located on Smith Street in the Parramatta CBD, opposite Parramatta railway station. It has been home to the 1st/15th Royal New South Wales Lancers, an armoured cavalry unit, since 1885.

== History ==
Construction of Lancer Barracks commenced in 1818 and was completed in 1820. It was constructed to replace earlier buildings that were in a state of disrepair.

Governor Lachlan Macquarie wrote to Earl Bathurst in 1817, stating that "a new barrack for the troops being also necessary at parramatta, the old one being almost in ruins and consequently very dangerous to be any longer inhabited by the soldiers, its purpose was to have a new barrack erected there as soon as the hospital has been completed". After construction, Lancer Barracks was home to a number of different British infantry regiments while the colony expanded.

When British troops were withdrawn in the 1850s, it was used by the police and government, until it became home to the Lancers in 1891. The barracks became a hub of the regiment and the city, being the base from which the Lancers trained to travel first to England, and then to fight in the Boer War.

Slowly, the barracks was modernised and preserved as a distinctive part of the area's colonial and military heritage. A number of memorials have been consecrated on the site to remember those who served at Lancer Barracks and were killed in conflicts.

The buildings were heritage listed as protected against demolition in 1977. A heritage management plan is place to preserve the barracks.

== Buildings ==
The Barracks, in its current form, consists of a number of operational buildings and workspaces. Of note, these include:

- The Two-Storey Building, or '100-Man Block'
- Bob's Hall, a single-story colonial building
- Linden House, home to the Regiment's Museum and Association
- Regimental Headquarters (Vernon House)
- The Drill Hall & Frank Tattersall Stables (the Other Ranks bar)
- The Officer's Mess Building
- The Sergeant's Mess Building
- Parade Ground
- The Lancer Band Rehearsal Studio

== Museum ==
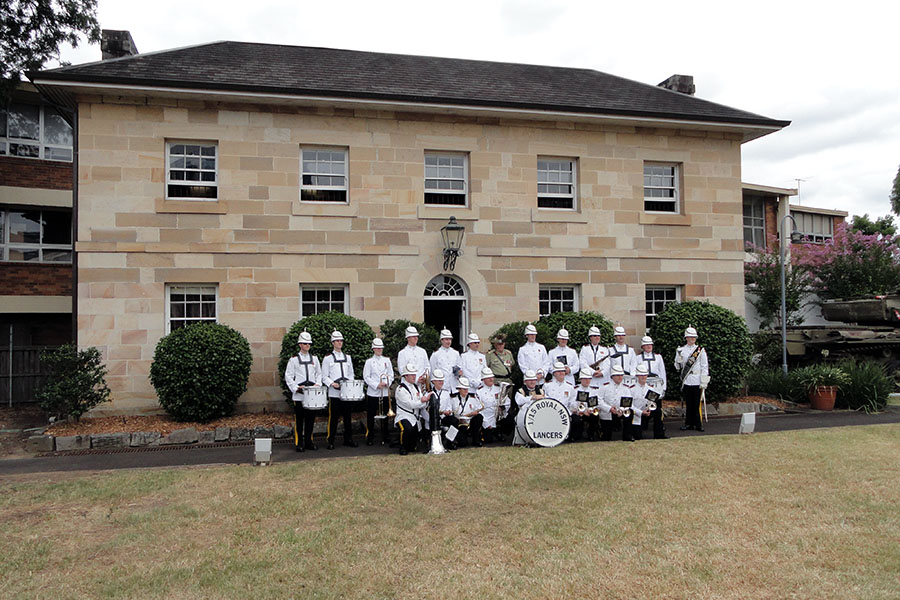
Linden House Museum

The Barracks is home to the Lancer Association Museum, in historic Linden House. It is open to the public on Sundays, and is run by the Lancer Association. A group of volunteers help to maintain and preserve the historic documents, artefacts, and armoured vehicles. The Museum Building was commemorated in 1981 as a memorial to all those who served with the Lancers.
