= Wadsworth Barracks =

Australian Army base in Victoria

- Bandiana, Victoria

Site information
- Type: Army barracks
- Controlled by: Australian Army

Wadsworth Barracks is an Australian Army base in the suburb of Bandiana, located about 5 km (3.1 mi) to the east of Wodonga, Victoria.
