= Lone Pine Barracks =

Army barracks in New South Wales, Australia

Coordinates: 32°37′8″S 151°10′15″E

Lone Pine Barracks is an Australian Army base established in 1940 located in the Hunter Valley, New South Wales, 8 kilometres (5.0 mi) south of Singleton.

The barracks is home to the Australian Army School of Infantry, Defence Support Group Singleton and other regular support services. The Royal Australian Infantry Corps Museum is also located within the barracks.

== See also ==
- List of Australian military bases
