= Warrane Barracks =

Australian Army barracks in Mornington

Coordinates: 42.864°S 147.377°E

Warrane Barracks is an Australian Army barracks in the Hobart suburb of Mornington. It is the home of several units including:

- Former home to B Coy, 12th/40th Battalion Royal Tasmania Regiment, prior to their move to Derwent Barracks in 2018.
- Former home to 60 Army Cadet Unit, Australian Army Cadets
