= Gaza Ridge Barracks =

- Bandiana, Victoria, Australia

Site information
- Type: Army barracks
- Controlled by: Australian Army

Location
- Coordinates: 36.146°S 146.924°E

Gaza Ridge Barracks is an Australian Army base in Bandiana, located about 5 km (3.1 mi) to the east of Wodonga. Part of the Army Logistic Training Centre is based there. It is also home to the Army Museum Bandiana, a large and diversified military museum that hosts a number of collections focussing on the history of the Army's logistic corps. Gaza Ridge Barracks is also the home to the 37th Australian Army Cadet Unit (37 ACU).
