= 2nd Force Support Battalion =

Australian Army unit

- Active: 1998 – 2024
- Country: Australia
- Branch: Australian Army
- Type: Logistics
- Size: One battalion
- Part of: 17 Sustainment Brigade
- Garrison/HQ: HQ at Derwent Barracks, Hobart

Insignia
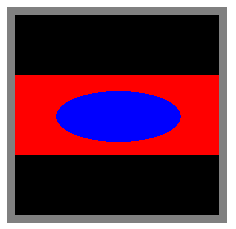
- Unit colour patch

The 2nd Force Support Battalion (2 FSB) was an Australian Army logistics battalion. Established in 1998, 2 FSB was a reserve unit headquartered in Hobart, with depot in various locations across Tasmania and Victoria. It was merged into the 8th Operational Support Unit in 2024.

== History ==
Formed on 1 August 1998 as a reserve unit, following the amalgamation of a number of supply, medical, military police, maintenance and transport units. Its headquarters was located at Derwent Barracks in Hobart, Tasmania. It also had depots in Bendigo, Devonport, Horsham and Melbourne. While forming in Tasmania, in 2011, it took over three reserve sub-units from 9 FSB in Victoria.

2 FSB formed part of the 17th Sustainment Brigade. Its role was to provide third line or 'general' support within an area of operations.

In December 2024 the 2nd Force Support Battalion was merged into the Sydney-based 8th Operational Support Unit. The merger aimed to provide the 2nd Division with a specialist logistics capability.

== Structure ==
As of 2020, 2 FSB comprised the following sub-units:

- Battalion Headquarters (Hobart)
- 6th Logistic Support Company (Hobart, Melbourne, Bendigo, Horsham & Devonport)
- 15th Force Support Squadron (Melbourne, Bendigo & Horsham)
- 44th Transport Squadron (Hobart & Devonport)

=== Previous sub-units ===
- 1st Petroleum Company
- 3rd Recovery Company
- 6th Supply Platoon
- 10th Health Company
- 15th Transport Squadron
