= Hampstead Barracks =

- Greenacres, South Australia

Site information
- Type: Army barracks
- Controlled by: Australian Army
- Open to the public: no

Location
- Coordinates: 34°52′13″S 138°37′13″E

Garrison information
- Garrison: Adelaide Universities Regiment

Hampstead Barracks is an Australian Army base in the Adelaide suburb of Greenacres, located about 6 kilometres (3.7 mi) to the north of the Adelaide central business district. Situated on the corner of Hampstead and Muller Roads, it is only a small suburban base, sitting on less than 24 acres of land. The barracks is home to the Tom Derrick VC Soldiers' Club, which is named after Tom Derrick, a South Australian Victoria Cross recipient from the Second World War.

The Adelaide Universities Regiment (AUR), an Australian Army Reserve officer training unit, is the main occupying unit, with the base hosting the Regimental Headquarters, as well as Training, Support and Beersheba Companies. The regiment's commanding officer is also the garrison commander. Other units located at Hampstead have included the Land Warfare Centre – South Australia (LWC–SA), which consists of the Warrant Officer and Non Commissioned Officer Academy South Australian Wing (WO & NCO A-SA Wing) and the Regional Education Detachment – South Australia, both of which are units of the Regular Army, although both have since moved to RAAF Edinburgh. The base is also home to a number of cadet units. These include: No. 604 Squadron, Australian Air Force Cadets, 44 Army Cadet Unit and 400, Australian Army Cadets new Drone Racing Unit.

In 2007, there was a proposal to close the base as part of the rationalisation of Army bases in Adelaide which would have seen the personnel based at Hampstead relocated to RAAF Base Edinburgh and Warradale Barracks. As of 2011, however, the base remains open.

In 2023, the Australian government was given the Defence Estate Audit which was conducted independently. This audit included the recommendation that Hampstead Barracks be completely divested.
