= Buckland Military Training Area =

Coordinates: 42°27′S 147°45′E

The Buckland Military Training Area (BMTA) is a small arms and manoeuvre range, located 76 kilometres (47 mi) from Hobart, Tasmania. The training area is the largest and most used training area in Tasmania. The range covers 23,428 hectares and has a 400-man camp and Range Complex, which includes a standard grenade range, three sneaker ranges, a snap gallery range, six tactical fire and manoeuvre training areas and a marksmanship training range.
