= Derwent Barracks =

Coordinates: 42°49′10″S 147°17′40″E

Derwent Barracks is an Australian Army barracks in the Hobart suburb of Glenorchy, near the Elwick Racecourse and Hobart Showgrounds. It is named after the nearby River Derwent. It is the home of several Army Reserve units including:

- B Coy, 12th/40th Battalion Royal Tasmania Regiment
- 6th / 13th Light Battery, 9th Regiment, Royal Australian Artillery
- 2nd Force Support Battalion
- LSE Tasmania, 9 CSSB

Other facilities:

- Joint Logistic Unit Victoria (JLUV) Hobart Detachment
- Area Clothing Store
- Anglesea Barracks Officers Mess (ABOM) Derwent Barracks Annex
- Sergeants Mess Annex
- Griffins Lair (Soldiers Club)
