= Timor Barracks =

- Dundas, New South Wales

Site information
- Type: Army barracks
- Controlled by: Australian Army

Timor Barracks is an Australian Army base in the suburb of Dundas, located about 17 km (11 mi) to the north-west of Sydney's Central Business District, New South Wales. It is named after Timor. The barracks was established in 1968 and is used as a headquarters of the 8th Brigade, Air Force cadets and Army cadets.
