= Youngtown Barracks =

Coordinates: 41.4784°S 147.1637°E

Youngtown Barracks is an Australian Defence Force barracks in central Launceston, Tasmania.

Youngtown Barracks is home to the following units:

- A Coy, 12th/40th Battalion, Royal Tasmania Regiment
- 67 Regional Cadet Unit, Army Cadet Unit
