= Australian Army Aviation Corps =

Administrative corps of the Australian Army

Australian Army Aviation
- Badge
- Founded: 1 July 1968
- Country: Australia
- Branch: Australian Army
- Type: Army aviation
- Motto: Vigilance
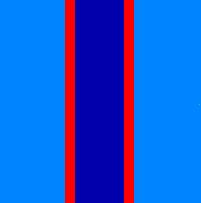
- Colors

Insignia
- Roundel

The Australian Army Aviation Corps (AAAvn) is an administrative corps of the Australian Army. It was formed on 1 July 1968. The motto of the Australian Army Aviation Corps is "Vigilance".

In August 2018, the Corps consisted of 140 aircraft, 1495 uniformed personnel and over 3000 personnel engaged in industry support.

The Royal Australian Electrical and Mechanical Engineers trains aeronautical engineers, structural fitters, technicians, life support staff and avionics technicians, while the Royal Australian Corps of Transport trains and provides air dispatchers and drivers. As with many other Army units, a wide range of qualified personnel fill roles within the regiments.

Members of the Aviation Corps are entitled to wear a sky blue beret with the Corps or Regiment badge. Members of other corps posted to AAAvn units wear the sky blue beret with their parent corps badge.

== Role ==
The Australian Army Aviation Corps provides aviation reconnaissance, firepower support, air mobility, battlefield support and surveillance, in a combined, joint or interagency environment. AAAvn primarily accomplishes this through mission-specific organisations such as task forces and battle groups where support is provided to the Army's combat brigades.

== History ==
The Corps was formed on 1 July 1968 with a strength of 106 officer pilots and one Non-Commissioned Officer, however the history of Australian military and Army aviation far predates the establishment of the Corps.

=== Years before establishment ===
The earliest known Australian military aviation flights were made by a Royal Engineer Balloon Section at the Sydney Agricultural Ground on 7–8 January 1901. In late 1910, a plan for an Australian Aviation Corps was submitted to the Military Board. Final approval to establish the Australian Flying Corps was promulgated in Military Order No.570 on 22 October 1912, with orders placed for two B.E.2a, two Deperdussin and a Bristol Boxkite to equip the new air arm.

==== Australian Flying Corps (1912–1920) ====
Australian Army Aviation traces its origins back to the Australian Flying Corps (AFC). The Australian Flying Corps was a branch of the Australian Army (then Australian Imperial Force). It was established as a result of the British Empire's call for aviation to be developed in the Empire's armed forces.

In 1914, the Central Flying School was established at Point Cook. Initially, the school consisted of two instructors and five aircraft. From this, Australia became the only British dominion to establish a flying corps for service during World War I. The four line squadrons served under the Royal Flying Corps.

The Australian Flying Corps saw action in Mesopotamia, Sinai, Palestine and on the Western Front. By the end of the war, operations were regular on the Western Front, with pilots providing direct support to the ground battle. For example, on 21 September 1918 a combined air patrol consisting of No. 1 Squadron (AFC) and British bombers discovered the main Turkish advance and inflicted heavy losses.

The Australian Flying Corps remained operational until 1919, when it was disbanded along with the First Australian Imperial Force. Although the Central Flying School continued to operate at Point Cook, military flying virtually ceased until 1920, when the Australian Air Corps (AAC) was formed. The Royal Australian Air Force (RAAF) was formed on 31 March 1921.

==== Post AFC years ====
After the RAAF was formed, military aviation was no longer a function of the Australian Imperial Force.

=== Establishment ===
Forties and Fifties. The early history of Australian Army aviation has traditional links with the Australian Flying Corps (AFC), Royal Australian Artillery (RAA), and the Royal Australian Air Force (RAAF). From the formation of modern Army aviation in the late 1950s and early 1960s aircrew were drawn from arms and services across the Army, supplemented by the RAAF in key positions.

No. 16 Army Light Aircraft Squadron was formed on 1 December 1960 as a joint Australian Army and Royal Australian Air Force unit at RAAF Base Amberley in Queensland. The Squadron was established to support Army activities and train Army pilots. It consisted of Cessna 180 aircraft and Bell 47G3B-1 helicopters.

==== Vietnam War ====
In June 1965, 161 Reconnaissance Flight (161 Recce Flight) was also raised at Amberley. On 13 September 1965, the Flight deployed with the 1st Battalion, Royal Australian Regiment (1 RAR) into Vung Tau. The Flight deployed initially with two Cessna 180s and two Sioux. The combined force was called the 1 RAR Group and was under operational control of the United States' 3rd Artillery Battalion of the 319th Artillery. The Flight moved to the newly established Luscombe Army Airfield at Nui Dat on 22 Mar 1967. Later, the flight was strengthened to four Cessna 180s and six Sioux.

16 Army Light Aircraft Squadron became the 1st Divisional Army Aviation Regiment on 26 April 1966 and was re-designated the 1st Aviation Regiment on 31 March 1967.

On 1 July 1968, the Corps was formed.

On 29 November 1969, Three Pilatus Porters were added to the Flight which was still on service in South Vietnam. In 1971, pilot training was commenced at Vung Tau by the 5th Aviation Detachment, US Army onto the OH58A Kiowa. Eight Kiowa were later delivered on 24 July 1971. 161 Recce Flight departed Vietnam on 7 March 1972 and was the last 1st Australian Task Force unit to leave Vietnam.

=== Years post-establishment ===
The Corps has seen service on a variety of operations since its creation:

- East Timor (INTERFET 1999, Operation Astute 2008)
- Iraq (Operation Falconer 2003)
- Pakistan (Kashmir Earthquake 2005)
- Papua New Guinea (Operation Papua New Guinea Assist 2007)
- Afghanistan (Operation Slipper 2008)
- Vanuatu 2015 173 Special Operations Aviation Squadron deployed to Vanuatu in 2015 – the first operational deployment of 6th Aviation Regiment

== Structure ==
The Corps consists of three operational regiments under the command of the 16th Aviation Brigade. The Brigade currently consists of:

- 16th Aviation Brigade headquarters (Enoggera Barracks, Brisbane, Queensland)
  - 1st Aviation Regiment (armed reconnaissance helicopter, Robertson Barracks, Darwin, Northern Territory)
    - 161st Reconnaissance Squadron
    - 162nd Reconnaissance Squadron
    - Logistic Support Squadron
    - Technical Support Squadron
  - 5th Aviation Regiment (transport helicopter, RAAF Base Townsville, Townsville, Queensland)
    - A Squadron
    - B Squadron
    - C Squadron
    - Logistic Support Squadron
    - Technical Support Squadron
  - 6th Aviation Regiment (special forces transport helicopter, Holsworthy Barracks, Sydney)
    - 171st Special Operations Aviation Squadron
    - 173rd Special Operations Aviation Squadron
    - Support Squadron

The Corps manages four primary employment streams:

- Pilot
- Aircrewman
- Groundcrew Mission Support
- Groundcrew Aircraft Support

== Colours ==
The design of the colour patch of the Australian Army Aviation Corps is based on the patch of the original Australian Army Flying Corps, from which the Aviation Corps was born. The three Aviation regiments have individual colour patches utilising the Corps patch. 1st Aviation Regiment's patch features a black rectangle in the centre of the Corps patch, 5th Aviation Regiment's patch features a black diamond in the centre, and 6th Aviation Regiment's patch includes a black oval.

== Equipment ==
Since November 2009 the Army's air assets are composed exclusively of rotary-wing aircraft (helicopters), the Royal Australian Air Force (RAAF) operating Australian Defence Force's fixed-wing fleet. A limited number of fixed-wing aircraft were used by Aviation Corps, mostly in a surveillance role. A ceremony was held at RAAF Base Townsville on 20 November 2009 to transfer the last three fixed-wing aircraft from the Army to the RAAF.

=== Current equipment ===
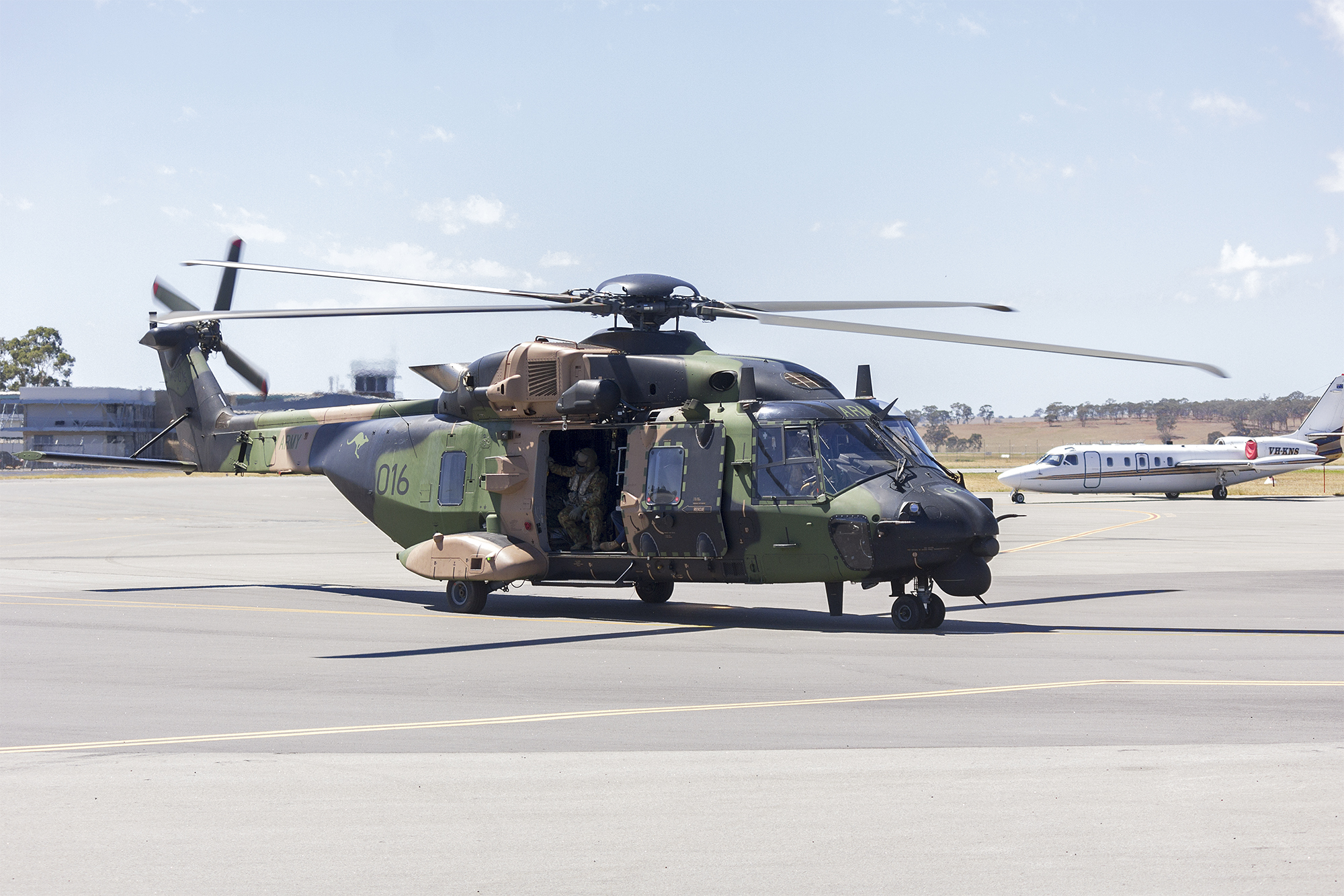
An Australian Army NHI MRH-90

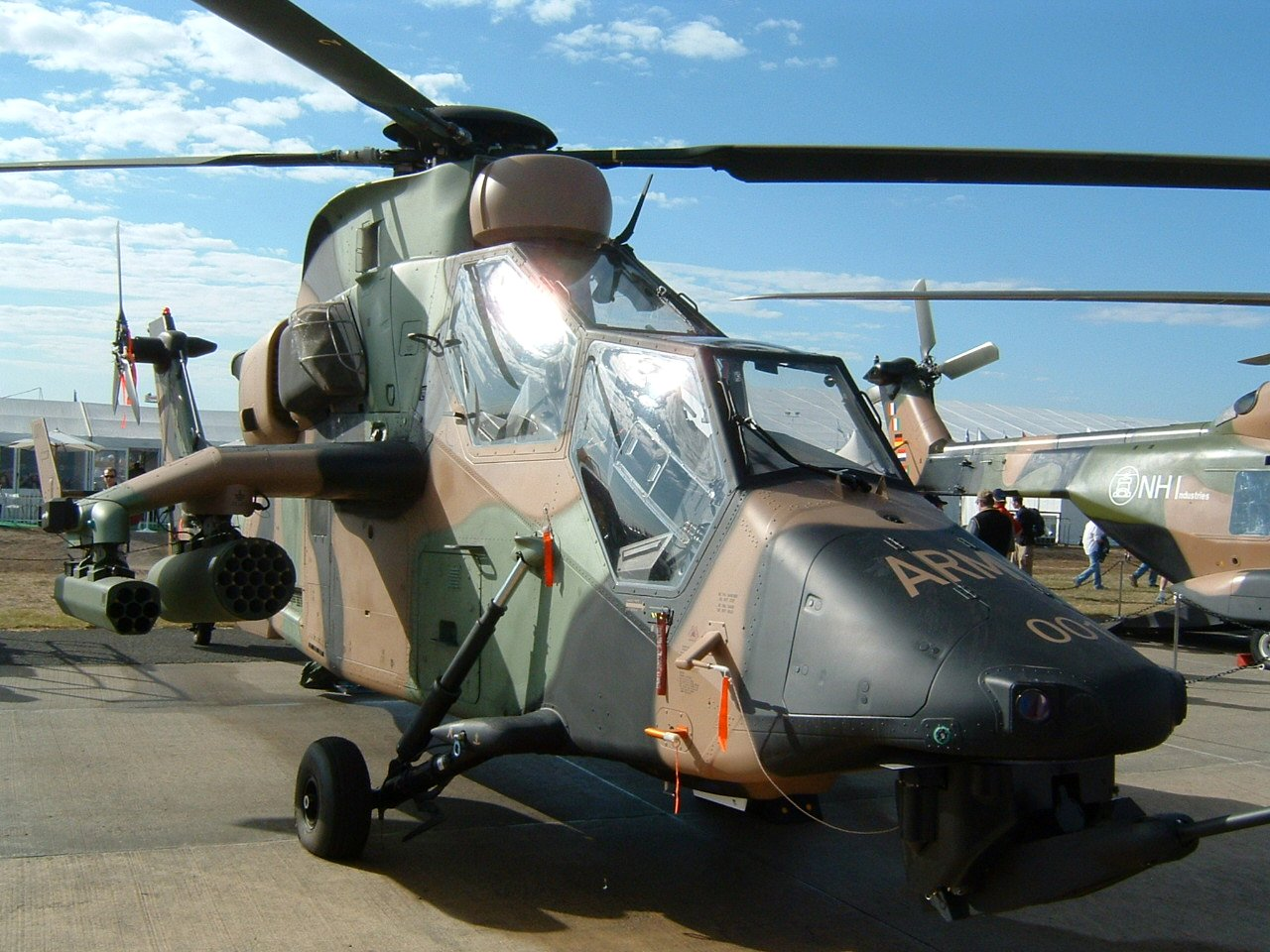
An Australian Army Tiger helicopter

The MRH 90 Taipan (Multi Role Helicopter 90, an Australian variant of the NHI NH90). The aircraft are designed for use in a troop-lift role. The first test flight of an MRH-90 was conducted at Eurocopter's flight test centre in Marignane, France on 28 March 2007. The first 13 of the total of 47 helicopters were delivered when the remaining aircraft were suspended until issues had been resolved. The MRH-90 was listed as a Project of Concern by the Australian Government on 28 November 2011 due to operational capability concerns. The first four were built in the main plant in France, the remainder built in Brisbane by Australian Aerospace. The MRH-90 was chosen ahead of the UH-60M Black Hawk. This decision was primarily made due to the ADF preferring the Black Hawk, but indicating both airframes could accomplish the missions required. The Government of the time therefore saw both aircraft as capable, but Airbus offered jobs and industrial knowledge by offering a production line in SW Queensland which Sikorsky did not. The MRH 90 Taipan is in service with the 5th and 6th Aviation Regiment. There are, however, significant difficulties with the MRH 90 Taipan in the Special Operations role, which is the remit of 6th Aviation Regiment. This includes an inability to provide covering fire to deployed troops while roping or rappelling from the airframe. In December 2021, the government announced that they would be replacing the Taipan.

The S-70A-9 Black Hawk was operated by the 171st Aviation Squadron in the 6th Aviation Regiment. Its role is to provide support to Special Operations Command. The Black Hawks were manufactured in Australia by Hawker de Havilland, under licence from Sikorsky. As of 2015, 34 are in service.

The CH-47D Chinook is operated by C Squadron, 5 Aviation Regiment. C Squadron was raised on the Army order of battle in June 1995, on the return of the Chinooks to Australia after re-manufacture by Boeing USA. The Chinooks' primary role is logistic and battlefield support. They can also be used in the troop-lift role. The then current fleet of seven CH-47Ds have been replaced by 14 new CH-47Fs, the first of which was delivered in May 2015.

The EC135 T2+ is operated by the Royal Australian Navy (RAN) and Boeing Defence Australia at 723 Squadron, HMAS Albatross. The EC135 is a twin-engine light utility helicopter used primarily for aircrew training but has been deployed on operations. All new Army Aviation aircrew are trained on the EC135.

=== Historical equipment ===
==== Fixed wing ====
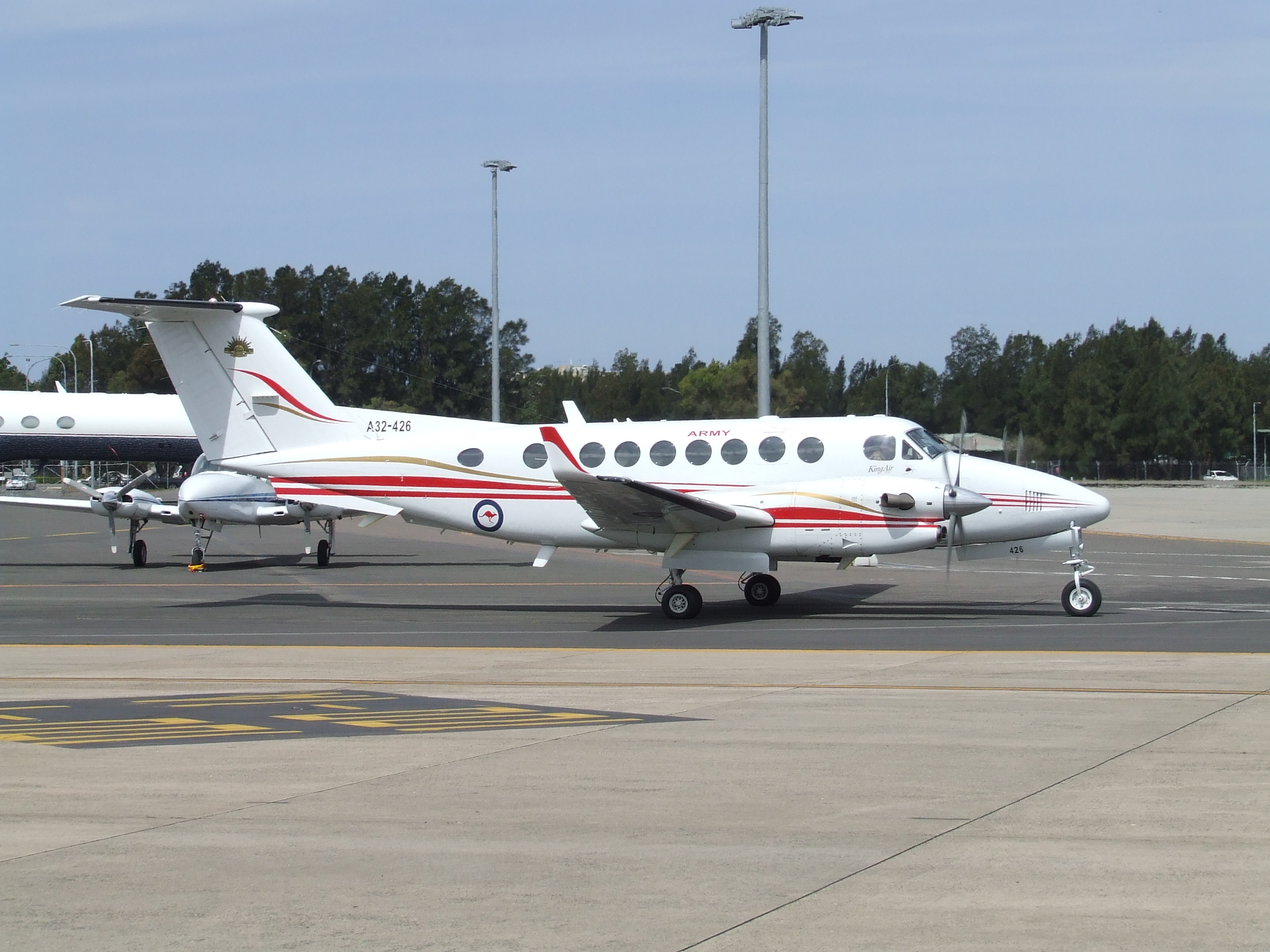
One of three Beechcraft King Air 350s to serve with Army Aviation

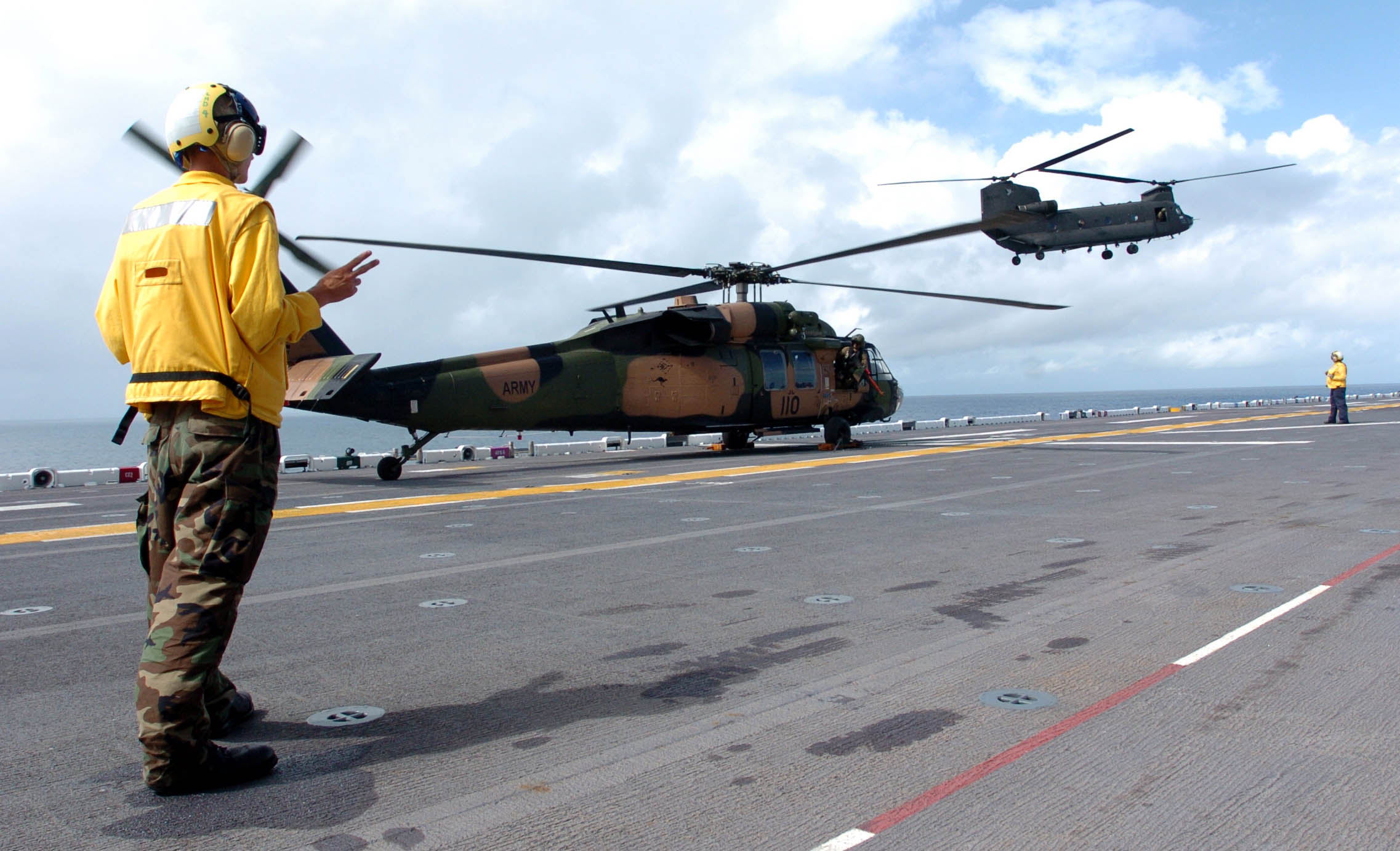
A S-70 Black Hawk (left) and CH-47 Chinook (right)

Army Aviation operated fixed-wing aircraft for a period of almost 50 years, from taking delivery of Cessna 180s in 1961 until 20 November 2009. 173rd Surveillance Squadron, based at Oakey, was the last operator of fixed-wing aircraft, using three Beechcraft B300 King Air 350s in Command and Control, Surveillance, and Transport roles. Other aircraft types operated were the Pilatus Porter, the GAF Nomad and the de Havilland Canada DHC-6 Twin Otter.

==== Rotary wing ====
The Bell 206B-1 Kiowa (1972–2019) was primarily employed for airborne observation and flying training. It was also used for the command and control of tactical aircraft, such as the F/A-18 and F-111. They often worked closely with artillery and armoured cavalry units. The Kiowa was replaced in 2018 by the Eurocopter EC135 under HATS.

The Tiger ARH (Armed Reconnaissance Helicopter) was designed to provide significant reconnaissance and fire support in a combined arms team and is equipped with Hellfire missiles, 70 mm rockets and cannons. 22 Tigers were be delivered to the Army under the AIR 87 Project, built at the Australian Aerospace Brisbane facility. The Tiger ARH achieved Final Operational Capability on 14 April 2016 originally planned for June 2009 and was in service with the 1st Aviation Regiment. The Tiger ARH was retired in September 2026, and is being replaced by 29 Boeing AH-64E Apache Guardian.

== Training ==
=== Aircrew training ===
Aircrew within Australian Army Aviation consist of officers and soldiers filling the roles of pilots and load-masters respectively. Load-masters are known as aircrewmen within the Army. Aircrew are selected via a screening process. For pilots, screening begins either prior to entry to the Australian Defence Force Academy, or during initial training at the Royal Military College – Duntroon (RMC-D). Pilots are occasionally selected from other Corps of the Army through the same selection process.

Historically, pilots were able to enter under the Specialist Service Officer scheme (SSO) where the Army rapidly trains and employs specialist officers. In 2018, this scheme was closed to pilots.

For aircrewmen, selection is restricted to in-service candidates who meet the selection criteria.

==== Pilot training ====
Pilots begin their employment training at the No.1 Flying Training School on the Pilatus PC-21. After successful completion, pilots are transitioned to rotary wing training at 723 Squadron, HMAS Albatross on the EC135. Pilots attain their category ("wings") and are then streamed for their respective operational conversion courses. These are typically run at the Army Aviation Training Centre. Once complete, pilots complete their Regimental Officer's Basic Course. The entire training continuum is designed to be completed in under two years.

==== Aircrewman training ====
Aircrewmen must be selected from within Army and are drawn from a wide range of Corps. Aircrewmen are trained initially at the Army Aviation Training Centre before attending their basic course at 723 Squadron, HMAS Albatross. Aircrewmen then complete an operational type conversion course.

=== Trade training ===
There are two non-aircrew trades in the Corps, Groundcrewman Aircraft Support and Groundcrewman Mission Support. Training for both is in addition to 80 days of basic training, undertaken at the Army Recruit Training Centre, Kapooka.

==== Groundcrewman aircraft support (GCAS) ====
Basic GCAS training consists of three individual courses covering driving, refuelling and forward arming. They are held at Army units throughout Australia. GCAS soldiers are primarily employed to conduct forward arming and refuelling of aircraft, in tactical or non-tactical environments.

==== Groundcrewman mission support (GCMS) ====
Training for groundcrewman mission support also consists of three courses covering driving, communications and command post operations. GCMS soldiers are employed to manage flight following, mission planning and other operational activities for aircraft missions.

== Order of precedence ==
Preceded by Royal Australian Infantry Corps	Australian Army Order of Precedence	Succeeded by Australian Army Intelligence Corps

== See also ==
- List of Australian Army aircraft
- List of Australian Army aviation units
- Oakey Army Aviation Centre
- Army aviation
- Boeing CH-47 Chinook in Australian service
