= 6th Aviation Regiment (Australia) =

Australian Army unit

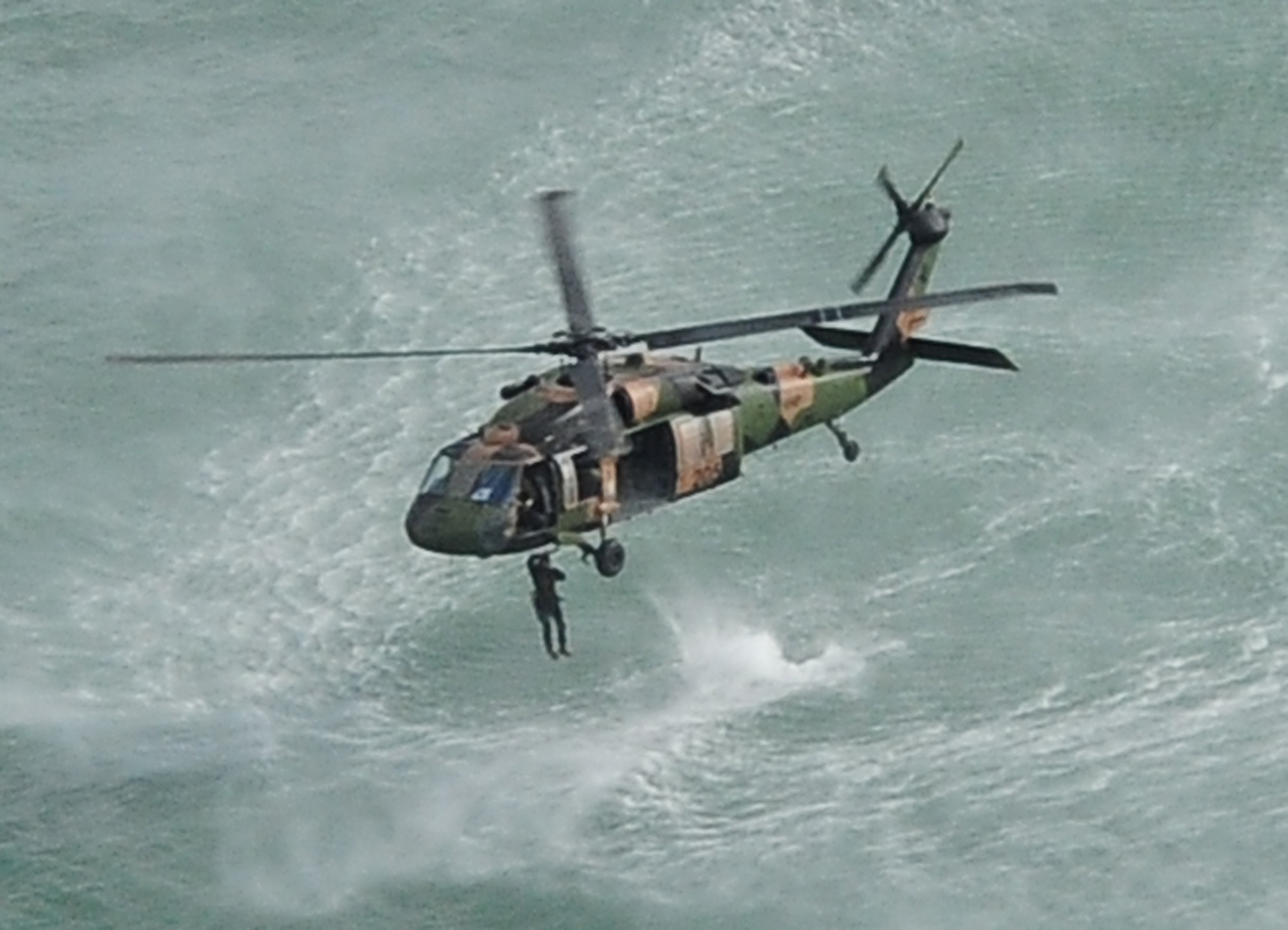
- A 1st Commando Regiment soldier jumping from a Black Hawk helicopter in 2013
- Active: 2008–current
- Country: Australia
- Branch: Australian Army
- Type: Special operations aviation
- Part of: 16th Aviation Brigade
- Headquarters: Holsworthy Barracks
- Motto: Valour

Insignia
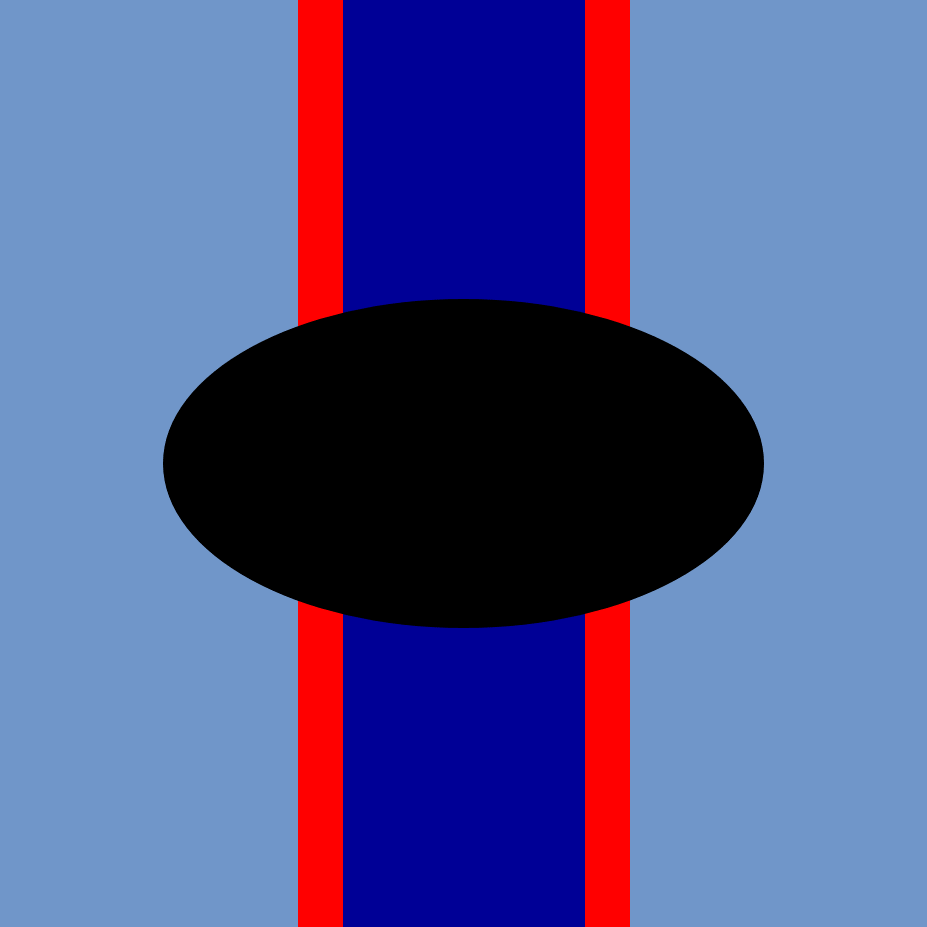
- Unit colour patch

Aircraft flown
- Multirole helicopter: UH-60M Black Hawk (Note: The Army received the first three UH-60Ms in August 2023 from an order of 40 UH-60Ms.)

The 6th Aviation Regiment is one of the Australian Army's three Army Aviation regiments and was raised on 1 March 2008 to provide air mobility for the Australian Army Special Operations Command (SOCOMD).

The 6th Aviation Regiment is being equipped with UH-60M Black Hawk helicopters. The regiment forms part of the 16th Aviation Brigade. The regiment is headquartered at Luscombe Army Airfield, Holsworthy Barracks, Sydney which was vacated by 161st Reconnaissance Squadron of the 1st Aviation Regiment in 1995. The regiment is under the operational command of SOCOMD for "directed special operations tasking".

== History ==
In November 2004, 'A' Squadron of the 5th Aviation Regiment based at RAAF Base Townsville swapped designations with the 171st Operational Support Squadron. The squadron separated from the 1st Aviation Regiment and was placed under the command of the 16th Aviation Brigade as an independent squadron and was renamed the "171st Aviation Squadron" to provide support to Special Operations Command. From December 2006, the squadron commenced relocating to Luscombe Airfield.

In March 2008, the 6th Aviation Regiment was raised following the implementation of a recommendation from the Board of Inquiry into the Crash of Black Hawk 221 and incorporated the 171st Aviation Squadron.

In November 2009, the army transferred the fixed wing Beechcraft King Air B 350s from the 173rd Surveillance Squadron to the Royal Australian Air Force. In 2010, the squadron was re-equipped with the Kiowa Light Utility Helicopter and re-roled as a training squadron for future MRH90 Taipan pilots and was renamed the "173rd Aviation Squadron" based at Luscombe Airfield. In 2013, the squadron converted to S70A-9 Black Hawk helicopters.

== Structure ==
The regiment comprises:

- Regiment Headquarters (Holsworthy Barracks, Sydney, New South Wales)
- 171st Special Operations Aviation Squadron
- 173rd Special Operations Aviation Squadron
- Support Squadron

The 171st Special Operations Aviation Squadron is the regiment's operational squadron and 173rd Special Operations Aviation Squadron is the regiment's training squadron.

== Operations ==
Notable operations include:

- Operation Queensland Flood Assist (2011 disaster assistance in South East Queensland)
- 2012 support to PNG elections

== Current aircraft ==
The regiment is being equipped with the UH-60M Black Hawk. The regiment previously operated a bespoke special operations MRH-90 Taipan. The MRH-90 was equipped with the Taipan Gun Mount that was specially designed for the special operations role. The gun mount could fit either a M134D minigun or a MAG 58 machine gun and when not in use could be moved into an outward stowed position to provide clearance to enable fast roping and rappelling.

The regiment was planned to transition to the MRH-90, an Australian variant of the NHI NH90, by December 2013 when the S70A-9 Black Hawk was to have been withdrawn from service. However, the MRH-90 program encountered significant problems, and in particular, the NH90 had not been operated in a dedicated special operations role, delaying the withdrawal with the Chief of Army extending the service of twenty Black Hawks to 2021 to develop a special operations role capable MRH90. This required developing a Fast Roping and Rappelling Extraction System (FRRES) and the gun mount for the cabin door.

In February 2019, the first two of twelve MRH90 helicopters were delivered to the regiment. In December 2021, on the same day the S70A-9 Black Hawk was withdrawn from service, the Australian government announced that it would replace the MRH-90s with new UH-60M Black Hawks.

In September 2023, the MRH90 fleet was retired earlier than planned following the fatal crash of a 173rd Special Operations Aviation Squadron MRH90 during exercise Talisman Sabre in July 2023. In August 2023, the Army began receiving deliveries of UH-60Ms.

=== Cancelled light helicopter project ===
In 2016, the government in the Defence White Paper 2016 announced their plan to acquire light helicopters for the regiment that would fulfil roles that the MRH90 Taipan was unable to perform. In March 2023, Australian Defence Magazine reported that the light helicopter project had been cancelled as the UH-60M Black Hawk the Army was acquiring would fulfil this role.

Up to sixteen four tonne class twin-engine helicopters were to be acquired under Project Land 2097 Phase 4 that were to be "optimised for operations in dense urban environments", capable of transporting six soldiers, fast-roping capable, were to have a sniping position and to be fitted with a Forward-looking infrared (FLIR), and able to be armed with a machine gun. The project required that a single Boeing C-17 Globemaster was to be capable of rapidly transporting four of the helicopters. Requests for tender closed in July 2020 with three bids received. Airbus Helicopters partnered with Australian companies to form Team Nightjar to offer the H145M. Babcock Australasia partnered with Bell to offer the Bell 429. Hawker Pacific partnered with Bell to also offer the Bell 429. Boeing decided not to offer the AH-6. The delivery of the light helicopter was expected to commence in 2022–2023.

== See also ==
- British Joint Special Forces Aviation Wing
- Canadian 427 Special Operations Aviation Squadron
- French 4th Special Forces Helicopter Regiment
- Italian 3rd Special Operations Helicopter Regiment
- U.S. 160th Special Operations Aviation Regiment – Night Stalkers
