= 171st Special Operations Aviation Squadron =

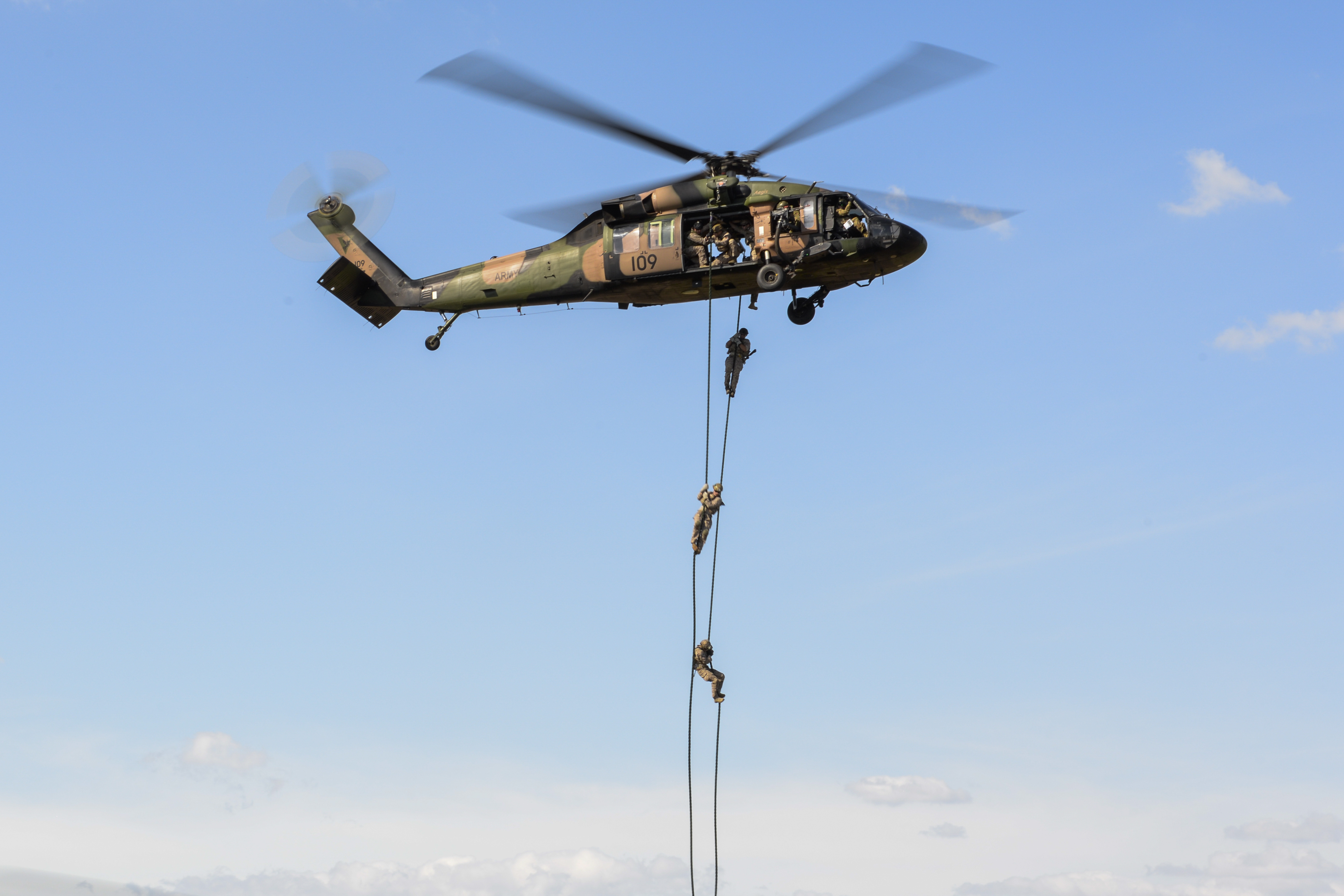
- Commandos from the 2nd Commando Regiment fast rope from a Black Hawk during Exercise Talisman Sabre 2015
- Active: 2004–present
- Country: Australia
- Branch: Australian Army
- Role: Special operations aviation
- Part of: 6th Aviation Regiment
- Garrison/HQ: Holsworthy Barracks

Aircraft flown
- Helicopter: UH-60M Black Hawk (Note: The Army received the first three UH-60Ms in August 2023 from an order of 40 UH-60Ms.)

The 171st Special Operations Aviation Squadron (171 SOAS) is an Australian Army helicopter squadron that provides aviation support to the Special Operations Command. The squadron is being equipped with the UH-60M Black Hawk helicopter. The squadron is based at Luscombe Airfield, Holsworthy Barracks, Sydney and forms part of the 6th Aviation Regiment as the regiment's sole operational squadron.

== Overview ==
The squadron primarily supports the Tactical Assault Group, troop lift support is also provided to other Special Forces based at Holsworthy and Perth, and to other east coast and southern Australian based units.

In March 1997, the Board of Inquiry into the Black Hawk Training Accident in June 1996 recommended that dedicated Army aviation assets be allocated in support of the counter terrorist and special operations capability and that the units be collocated during training, planning and the conduct of operations.

== History ==
The 171st Special Operations Aviation Squadron traces its lineage back to the 161st Reconnaissance Flight which was formed in June 1965 based at RAAF Base Amberley. The Flight was part of the 16th Army Light Aircraft Squadron which in 1967 became the 1st Aviation Regiment. The Flight served in Vietnam from 1965 to 1971 and during this period was renamed the 161st (Independent) Reconnaissance Flight. On return from Vietnam, the Flight was based at Oakey. On 31 January 1974, the Flight was re-designated as the "171st Operational Support Squadron" following a restructure of the 1st Aviation Regiment using the number from the disbanded 171st Air Cavalry Flight.

On 19 December 2002, the Prime Minister announced the creation of the Special Operations Command and that the government would accelerate the purchase of the MRH90 Taipan helicopters to enable a squadron of helicopters to be based in Sydney as a potent addition to the Tactical Assault Group East.

On 28 November 2004, 'A' Squadron of the 5th Aviation Regiment based at RAAF Base Townsville swapped designations with the 171st Operational Support Squadron. The squadron was equipped with the Sikorsky S-70A Black Hawk with the role of providing support to the Special Operations Command.

The squadron separated from the 1st Aviation Regiment and was placed under the command of the 16th Aviation Brigade as an independent squadron and was re-designated as the "171st Aviation Squadron". The squadron was commanded by a lieutenant colonel in addition to the conventional squadron commander of Major rank.

In July 2005, Holsworthy Barracks was selected as the location in Sydney to relocate the squadron. In December 2006, the squadron relocated to temporary facilities at Luscombe Airfield with the redevelopment of the airfield expected to be completed by late 2008.

The squadron was involved in operations in East Timor as part of Operation Astute. On 29 November 2006, a Squadron Black Hawk helicopter crashed during Operation Quickstep while attached to HMAS Kanimbla off the coast of Fiji. The helicopter's pilot, Captain Mark Bingley, and Trooper Joshua Porter from the Special Air Service Regiment were killed in the crash.

In March 2008, the squadron became part of the newly raised 6th Aviation Regiment following implementation of a recommendation from the Board of Inquiry into the Crash of Black Hawk 221 to raise a regiment.

The squadron has been renamed the "171st Special Operations Aviation Squadron"; it has had a new name from at least January 2020.

== Aircraft ==
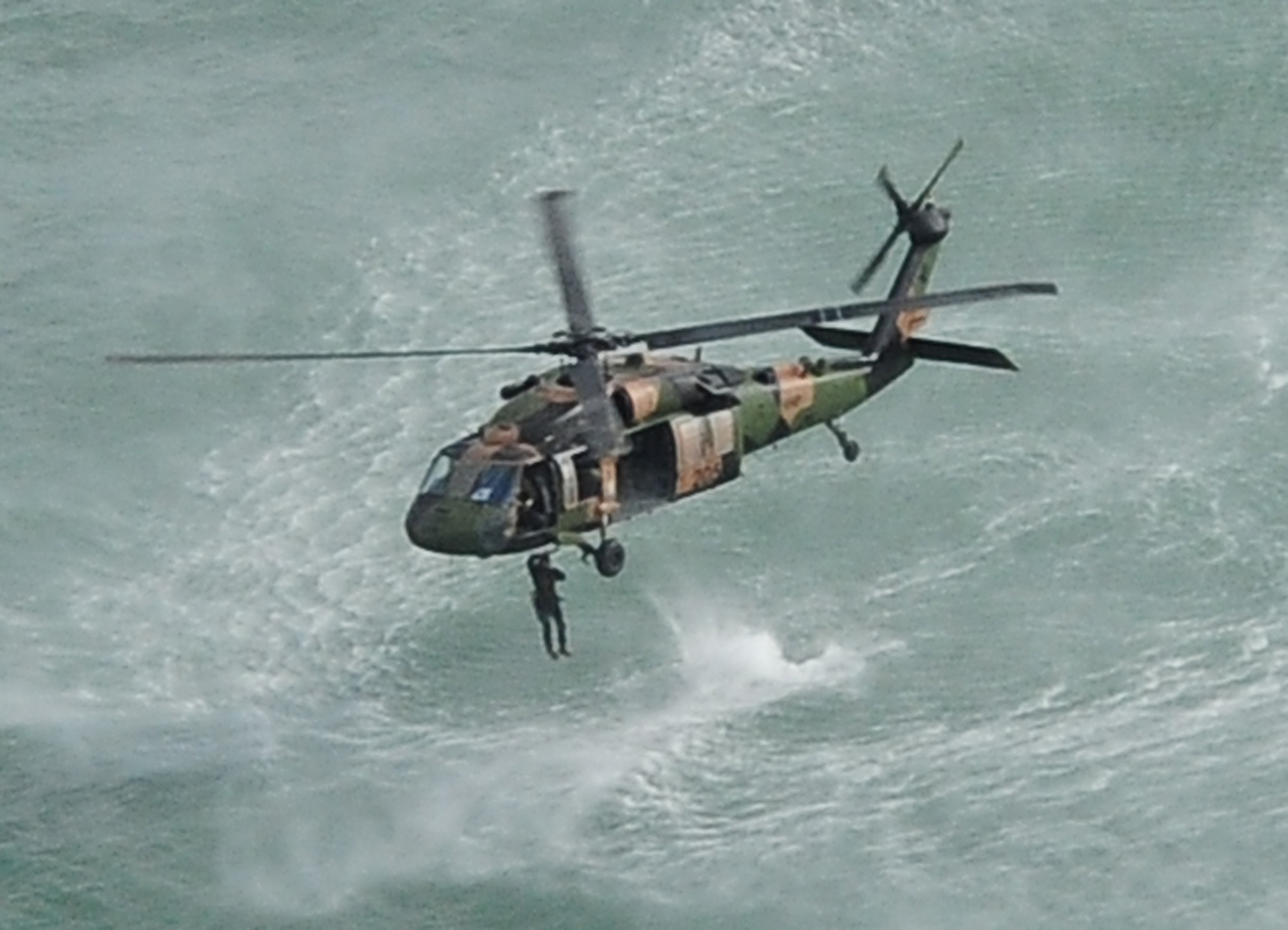
A Commando from 1st Commando Regiment jumping from a Black Hawk in 2013

The squadron is being equipped with the UH-60M Black Hawk. The squadron was equipped with the MRH90 Taipan an Australian variant of the NHI NH90. The 6th Aviation Regiment completed the transition from the S-70A-9 Black Hawk to the MRH90 in December 2021. The regiment was originally planned to have made the transition from the S-70A-9 Black Hawk to the MRH90 by December 2013 when the Black Hawk was scheduled to be retired from service.

The MRH90 program encountered significant problems, and in particular, the NH90 had not been operated in a dedicated special operations role. In December 2015, Jane's Defence Weekly reported that the Chief of Army had delayed the retirement of the Black Hawk until the end of 2021. Twenty Black Hawks were retained with eighteen based at Holsworthy and two at the Oakey Army Aviation Centre in Oakey in order to develop a special operations capable MRH90. This required developing a Fast Roping and Rappelling Extraction System (FRRES) and a gun mount for the cabin door. The Taipan Gun Mount can fit either a M134D minigun or MAG 58 machine gun and when not in use can be moved into a outward stowed position to provide clearance to enable fast roping and rappelling. In February 2019, the first two of twelve MRH90s were delivered to the regiment.

In 2016, the Australian government in the Defence White Paper 2016 announced a plan to acquire light helicopters for the regiment under Project Land 2097 Phase 4 that would fulfil roles that the MRH90 was unable to perform. In March 2023, Australian Defence Magazine reported that the light helicopter project had been cancelled as the UH-60M Black Hawk the Army was acquiring would fulfil this role. In December 2021, on the same day the S70A-9 Black Hawk was retired, the government announced that it would replace the MRH90s with new UH-60M Black Hawks.

In September 2023, the MRH90 fleet was retired earlier than planned following the fatal crash of a 173rd Special Operations Aviation Squadron MRH90 during exercise Talisman Sabre in July 2023. In August 2023, the Army began receiving deliveries of UH-60Ms.

== See also ==
- British Joint Special Forces Aviation Wing
- Canadian 427 Special Operations Aviation Squadron
- French 4th Special Forces Helicopter Regiment
- Italian 3rd Special Operations Helicopter Regiment
- U.S. 160th Special Operations Aviation Regiment – Night Stalkers
