= 161st Independent Reconnaissance Flight (Australia) =

161 (Independent) Reconnaissance Flight
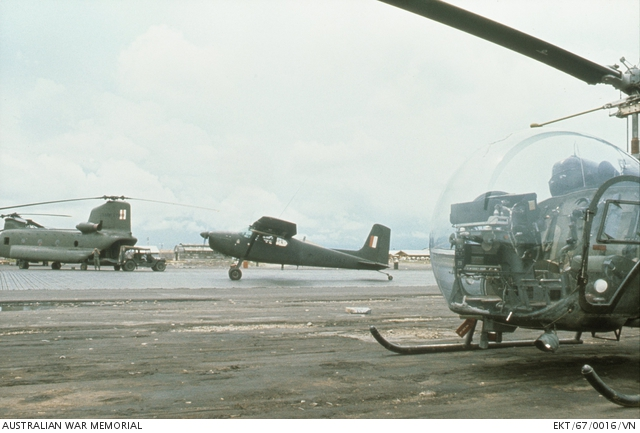
- U.S. CH-47 and 161st (Independent) Reconnaissance Flight Cessna 180 and Sioux helicopter at Vung Tau Air Base in March 1967
- Active: 1965–74
- Disbanded: 1974
- Country: Australia
- Branch: Australian Army
- Role: Reconnaissance / Observation
- Part of: 1st Australian Task Force
- Garrison/HQ: Vung Tau, Nui Dat and Bien Hoa

Aircraft flown
- Observation helicopter: Bell H-13 Sioux, Bell OH-58 Kiowa
- Reconnaissance: Cessna O-1 Bird Dog
- Transport: Cessna 180, PC-6 Turbo Porter

The 161 (Independent) Reconnaissance Flight was an Australian Army aviation unit of fixed-wing and rotary aircraft.

In June 1965, the 161 Reconnaissance Flight was raised part of the No. 16 Army Light Aircraft Squadron based at RAAF Base Amberley for deployment to the Vietnam War. In September that year the flight deployed to South Vietnam with two Cessna 180 planes and two Sioux light observation helicopters in order to support the 1st Battalion, Royal Australian Regiment based at Bien Hoa Air Base. The unit moved to Vung Tau Air Base on 13 May 1966. The Flight was re-designated the 161 (Independent) Reconnaissance Flight. when unit strength was increased, so making it an independent unit (and able to draw its own rations and rations). Following the expansion of the Australian commitment, the Flight continued to serve in this role as part of the 1st Australian Task Force, with an enlarged, established and expanded responsibilities, operating out of Vung Tau and Nui Dat until the end of 1971 when it was withdrawn to Australia.

On return from Vietnam, the Flight was located at Oakey, Queensland, from January 1971 until January 1974. On 31 January 1974, 1st Aviation Regiment was reorganised with 171 Air Cavalry Flight based at Holsworthy re-designated as 161 Reconnaissance Squadron. 161 Reconnaissance Flight based at Oakey was re-designated as 171 Operational Support Squadron.
