= 16th Aviation Brigade (Australia) =

Formation of the Australian Army

- Active: 2002–present
- Country: Australia
- Branch: Army
- Type: Aviation
- Size: 1,150 (active); 150 (reserve)
- Part of: Army Aviation Command
- Garrison/HQ: Enoggera, Queensland

Commanders
- Current commander: BRIG Fern Thompson
- Deputy commander: COL Charlie Barton

Insignia
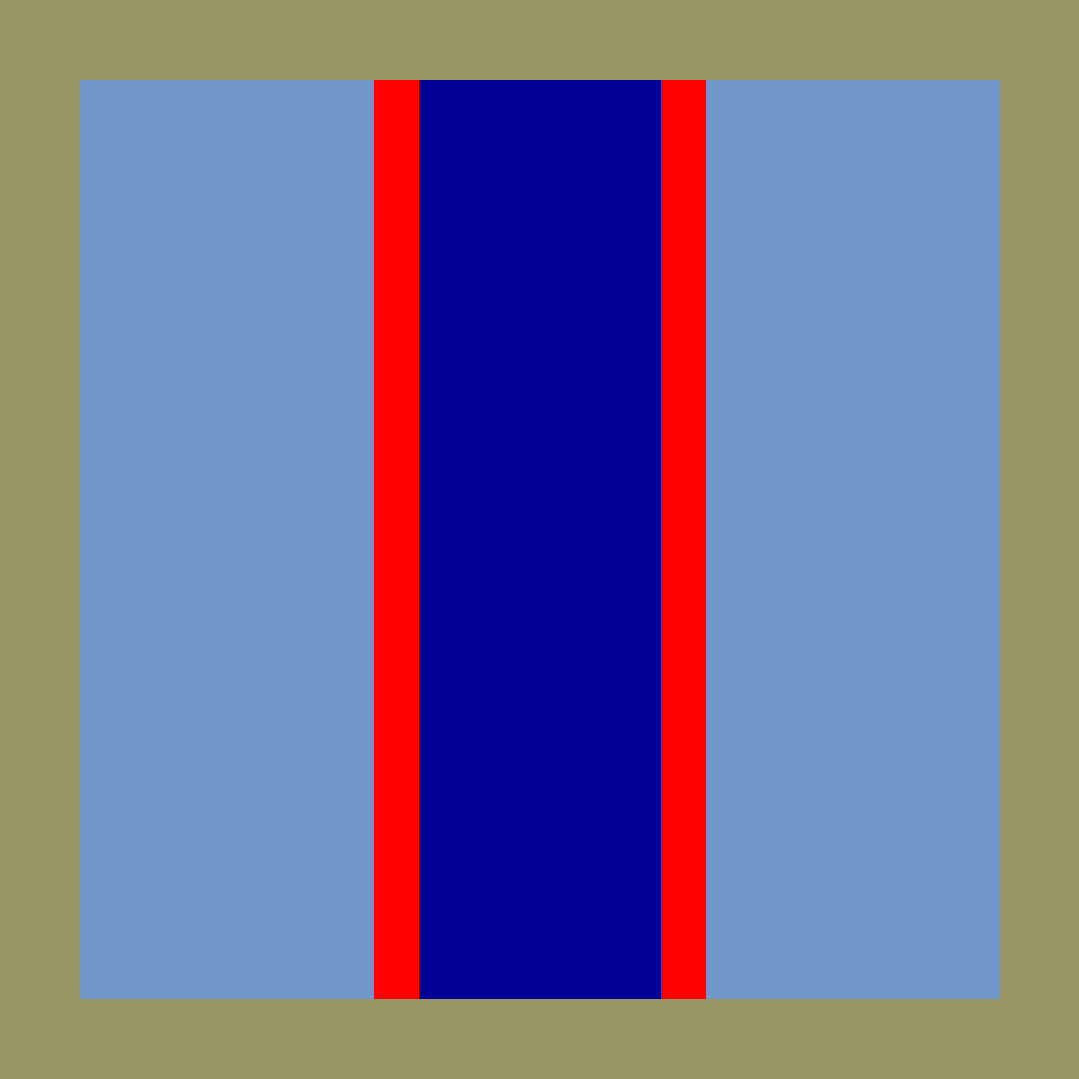
- Unit colour patch

The 16th Aviation Brigade (16 Avn Bde) commands all the Australian Army aviation units and has technical control of the Army Aviation Training Centre reporting to Army Aviation Command. The Brigade was formed on 2 April 2002 by combining Headquarters Divisional Aviation (Operational Command) and Headquarters Aviation Support Group (Technical Command) and is headquartered in Enoggera Barracks, Queensland. It was originally named Headquarters 16th Brigade (Aviation) and was renamed to the 16th Aviation Brigade.

The Army Aviation Training Centre (AAvnTC) based at Oakey is responsible for training and maintains a training fleet reporting separately to Army Aviation Command.

== Organisation ==
As of 2025 the 16th Aviation Brigade consists of:

- 16th Aviation Brigade headquarters (Enoggera Barracks, Brisbane, Queensland)
  - 1st Aviation Regiment (armed reconnaissance helicopter, Robertson Barracks, Darwin, Northern Territory)
    - 161st Reconnaissance Squadron
    - 162nd Reconnaissance Squadron
    - Logistic Support Squadron
    - Technical Support Squadron
  - 5th Aviation Regiment (transport helicopter, RAAF Base Townsville, Townsville, Queensland)
    - A Squadron
    - B Squadron
    - C Squadron
    - Logistic Support Squadron
    - Technical Support Squadron
  - 6th Aviation Regiment (special forces transport helicopter, Holsworthy Barracks, Sydney)
    - 171st Special Operations Aviation Squadron
    - 173rd Special Operations Aviation Squadron
    - Support Squadron
  - 20th Regiment, Royal Australian Artillery (Unmanned Aerial Systems, Gallipoli Barracks, Enoggera)
    - 131st Battery
    - 132nd Battery
    - 133rd Battery (forming 2024)
    - Operational Support Battery
    - Combat Service Support Battery
  - 16th Aviation Support Battalion

== Equipment ==
Aircraft	Origin	Type	Versions	In service
Boeing CH-47 Chinook	United States	Heavy-lift transport helicopter	CH-47F	14
Eurocopter Tiger	Europe	Attack and Reconnaissance helicopter	Tiger ARH	22
Sikorsky UH-60M Black Hawk	United States	Multi-role transport helicopter	UH-60M	12, 40 to be delivered by 2030
AH-64E Apache	United States	Attack helicopter	AH-64E	0 (29 ordered to replace the Tiger ARH)
Airbus H135 Juno	Europe	Light utility and training helicopter	H135 T3+ Juno	5
