= List of Australian Army aircraft =

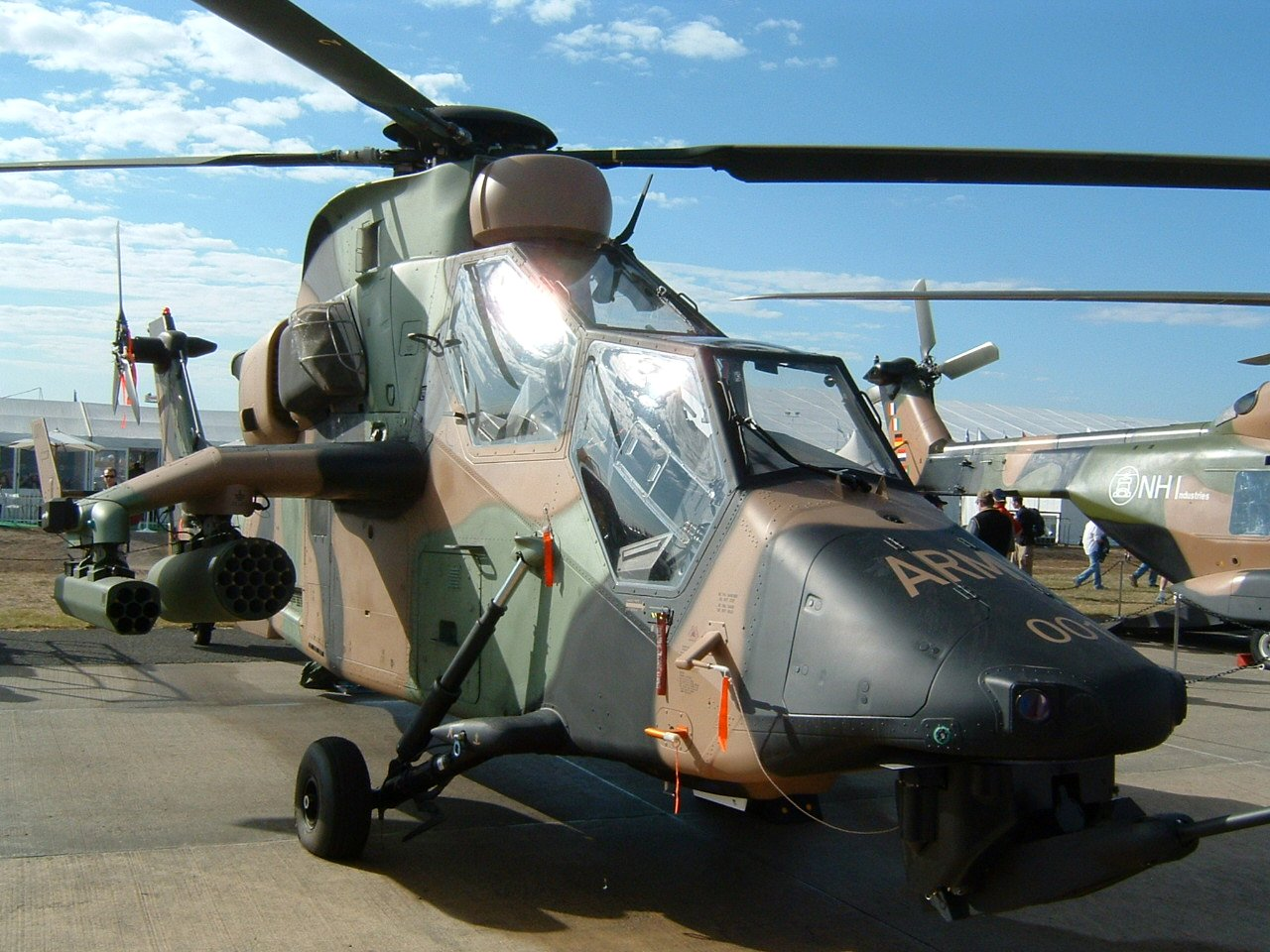
A Tiger helicopter

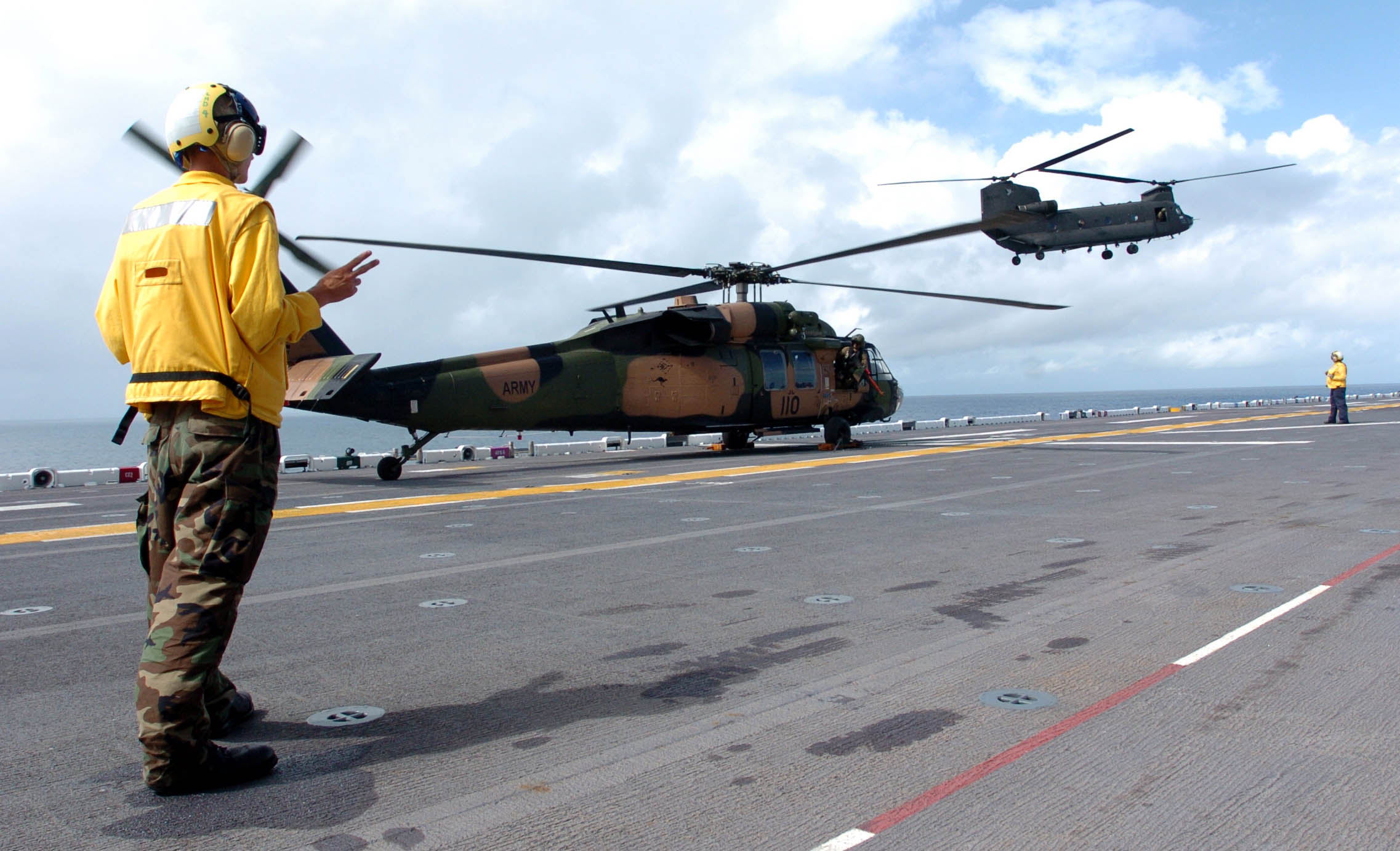
A S-70 Blackhawk (left) and CH-47 Chinook (right)

List of Australian Army aircraft is a list of all aircraft operated by the Australian Army since its formation. The Army flies helicopters, fixed-wing aircraft, and also unmanned aerial vehicles of various types. The Army has a diverse portfolio of lift assets including fleet of latest Chinook helicopters, 22 Tiger attack helicopters, 15 EC135 (which it shares with Navy for training), and increasing numbers UH-60. A few other types, such as leased AW139 and Bell 412 are also used. The MRH-90 fleet which was a major asset for over a dozen years was fully retired in 2023 and are in storage, and the last of the S-70 were retired in 2021. Additional UH-60 and EC135 are being acquired in the 2020s.

The MRH-90 retirement is handled in several ways, prior to retirement additional Chinooks were acquired, and prior to and after additional AW139, Bell 412, UH-60, and EC135 were ordered or leased. The Navy and Air Force have their own aircraft, and the Navy uses SH-60 Sea Hawk and ordered more.

== Current ==
Aircraft	Origin	Role	Versions	Year introduced	No. in service	Notes
Boeing AH-64E Apache	United States	Attack helicopter	AH-64E Guardian	2025	2 (+ 27 on order)	29 Boeing AH-64E Apache Guardians were ordered for the Army in 2021 to replace the Tiger ARH. As of September 2025, 2 Apache Guardians have been delivered. The Army is expected to receive all Apache aircraft by 2029.
Boeing CH-47 Chinook	United States	Transport helicopter	CH-47F		14	Main article: Boeing CH-47 Chinook in Australian service One CH-47D was destroyed during operations in Afghanistan on 30 May 2011. Two additional CH-47Ds ordered in December 2011 as attrition replacement and to boost heavy lift capability. The last of 7 new CH-47Fs was delivered in September 2015 and the D models subsequently retired.
Sikorsky UH-60M Blackhawk	United States	Utility helicopter	UH-60M Blackhawk	2023	10 (+ 30 on order)	After reliability issues with the MRH90, in 2021 the ADF announced they would replace the MRH90 fleet with 40 UH-60M Blackhawk helicopters, announced the same year as the previous S-70A-9 Blackhawks were retired from service. The first 3 were delivered in 2023 after the grounding and subsequent retirement of the MRH90 fleet. The US announced an accelerated delivery timeline on the remaining 37 Blackhawks to help Australia replace the MRH90 fleet.

- 5 AW139 leased to the Army.
- 2 Bell 412 under lease at Army Aviation Training Center.
- 15 EC135 are shared with the Navy for training, but also intended for disaster relief in emergency.

=== Unmanned Aerial Vehicles ===
Aircraft	Origin	Role	Versions	Year introduced	No. In service	Notes
AeroVironment Wasp AE	United States	SUAS – Reconnaissance and battlefield surveillance	Wasp EA	2018	undisclosed	Wasp entered service in 2014 for test and evaluation. the Wasp AE entered service with the Australian Army in 2018.
Black Hornet Nano	Norway	MicroUAS Squad Level Reconnaissance and surveillance	PD-1000 Black Hornet	2014	undisclosed	The Black Hornet entered service in 2014 for test and evaluation.
AAI RQ-7 Shadow	United States	Tactical UAS Reconnaissance and battlefield surveillance	RQ-7B Shadow 2000 UAV	2012	18	18 aircraft. The Shadow 200 entered service in 2012 replacing the ScanEagle. Operated by the 20th Surveillance and Target Acquisition Regiment, Royal Australian Artillery

== Historic & Current ==
=== Unmanned Aerial Vehicles ===
Aircraft type	Origin	Variant	Role	Years In service	Notes
A50 AAI Aerosonde	Australia	Aerosonde Mk 2	Surveillance	2003	Four aircraft. Deployed to the Solomon Islands during Operation Anode in 2003. Operated by the 131st surveillance and Target Acquisition Battery.
Boeing Insitu ScanEagle	United States		Reconnaissance and battlefield surveillance	– 2012	Obsolete, No longer operated by the Australian Army. Operated by the 20th Surveillance and Target Acquisition Regiment, Royal Australian Artillery
Elbit Systems Skylark	Israel	Skylark I	Reconnaissance and battlefield surveillance		Obsolete, no longer in service with the Australian Army. Replaced by the Wasp EA.
Phantom (unmanned aerial vehicle series)	China	Phantom 4	Reconnaissance and battlefield surveillance	2017–	350 aircraft

=== Fixed Wing Aircraft ===
Aircraft type	Origin	Variant	Role	Service period	Notes
A11 Auster Mark III	United Kingdom	Mk III; MK V AOP.6	Two-seat air observation post aircraft	1944–1959	58 aircraft. Operated by the RAAF in support of the Australian Army.
A98 Cessna 180	United States	Model 180A; Model 180D; Model 180E	Two to four seat liaison, observation aircraft	1959–1975	19 aircraft
A14 Pilatus PC-6B Turbo-Porter	Switzerland	PC-6B Turbo Porter	Eight-seat reconnaissance, light transport aircraft	1968–1992	19 aircraft
Cessna L-19 Bird Dog	United States	O-1 Bird Dog	One or two-seat liaison, observation aircraft	1967–1968	Three aircraft on loan from the US Army. Operated by the 161st Independent Reconnaissance Flight (Australia)
Beechcraft Queen Air	United States	A65 Queen Air; B70 Queen Air		1971–19??	Four aircraft. Operated by the Australian Army Survey corps
A18 GAF Nomad	Australia	Nomad N22B; Nomad N24A	Two-crew twin-engine utility transport, reconnaissance aircraft, capable of carrying 11 passengers	1975–1995	22 aircraft
A32 Beechcraft Super King Air	United States	King Air B350	Twin-engine utility transport aircraft	1997-2009	24 aircraft. Including leased civilian aircraft. 4 owned aircraft given to the RAAF in 2009.
Embraer EMB 110 Bandeirante	Brazil	EMB 100P1 Bandeirante		1995 only	Four aircraft were leased from Flight West. Operated by the 173rd Aviation Squadron (Australia)
De Havilland Canada DHC-6 Twin Otter	Canada	DHC-6-320 Twin Otter		1996–2004	Three aircraft were leased from Hawker Pacific 1996. Operated by the 173rd Aviation Squadron (Australia)
CASA C-212 Aviocar	Spain	C-212-400		2007-current	Two aircraft leased from Skytraders since 2013 with two 212-200 formerly leased from Military Support Services. Operated by the Australian Defence Force Parachuting School.

=== Helicopters ===
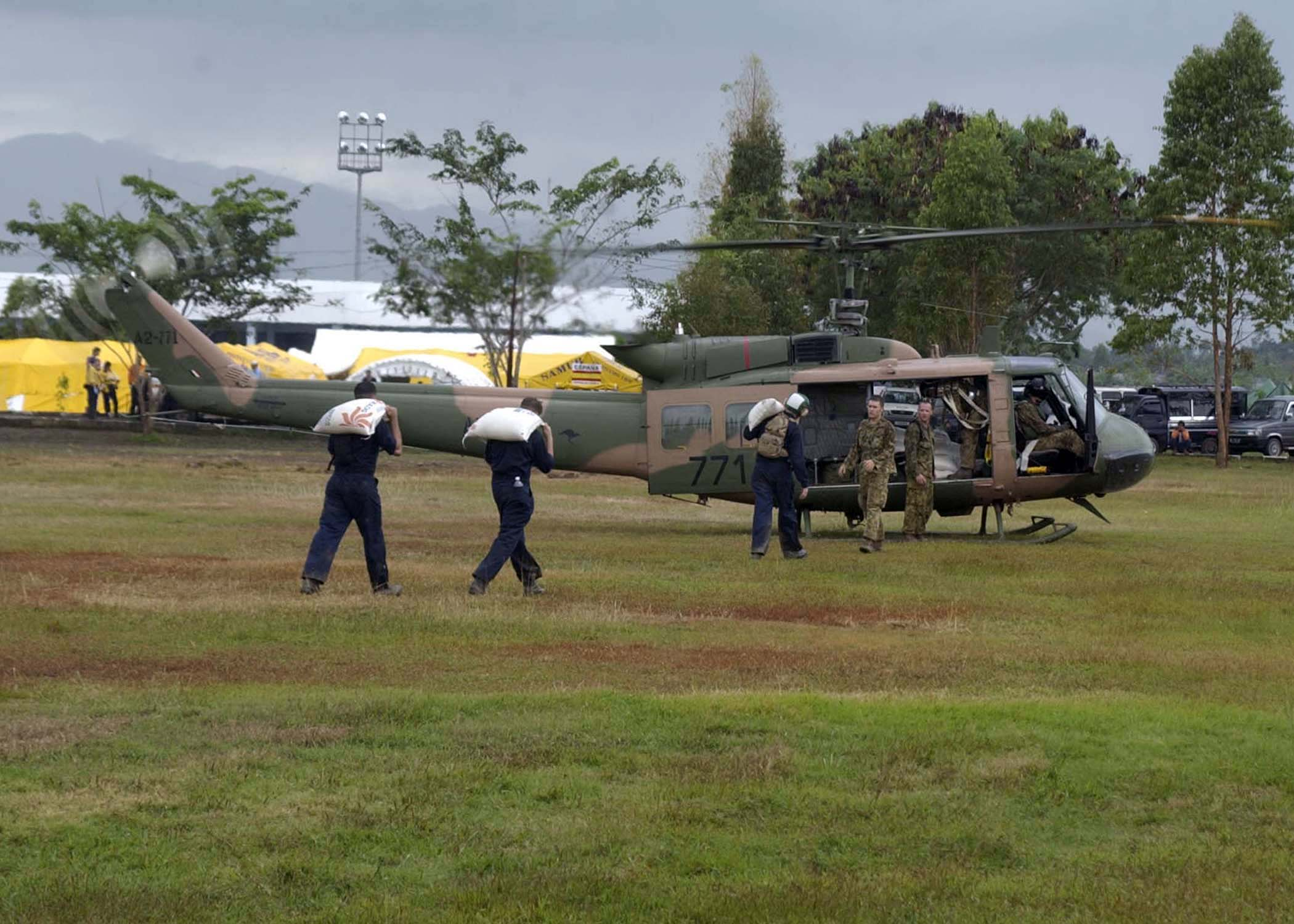
An Australian Army UH-1 Iroquois helicopter on the island of Sumatra, Indonesia after the 2004 Indian Ocean earthquake and tsunami.

Historic and also current for context

Aircraft type	Origin	Variant	Role	Service period	Notes
A22 Aerospatiale AS.350B Squirrel	France	AS.350B Squirrel	Two-crew light utility, training helicopter	1990–1998	18 helicopters. Operated by the Australian Defence Force Helicopter School
A1 Bell 47 Sioux	United States	Model 47G-2 Sioux; Model 47G-2A Sioux; Model 47G-3B1 Sioux	Three-seat light utility, training helicopter	1960–1977	47 helicopters
A17 Bell / CAC CA-32, OH-58A Kiowa	United States; Australia	CAC CA-32, OH-58A Kiowa; Model 206B-1 Kiowa	Light observation, reconnaissance helicopter	1971–2018	64 helicopters. Including eight US built helicopters, which were leased to the Australian Army.
A2 Bell UH-1 Iroquois	United States	UH-1H Iroquois	Multi-role utility transport helicopter	1990–2007	25 helicopters. Transferred from the RAAF to the Australian Army in 1990
A17 Boeing CH-47 Chinook	United States	CH-47D Chinook; CH-47F Chinook	Twin-rotor medium-lift transport helicopter	1995-current	18 helicopters
A25 Sikorsky S-70 Blackhawk	United States	S-70A-9 Black Hawk	Four-crew multi-role battlefield support helicopter, capable of carrying 10 troops	1990-2021	39 helicopters. Transferred from the RAAF to the Australian Army.
A38 Eurocopter Tiger	Europe	Tiger ARH	Armed reconnaissance, attack helicopter	2004-2026	22 helicopters
A40 NHIndustries NH90	Europe	TTH: Tactical Transport Helicopter	Utility transport helicopter	2007-2023	40 helicopters
Bell 412	United States; Canada	Bell 412		2007-current	Two helicopters. Operated by the Army Aviation Training Centre
NHIndustries NH90	Europe	Utility helicopter	MRH90 – TTH: Tactical Transport Helicopter	2007-2023	39 (40 original. 1 destroyed in crash) The MRH-90 Taipan fleet was prematurely retired in September 2023, after a fatal crash of an MRH90 in Northern Queensland Pacific Ocean killing 4 servicemembers. Previously in March 2023 an engine failure lead to an MRH90 ditching in the ocean off Jervis Bay. Currently being dismantled for parts (Circa 2024)

== See also ==
- List of equipment of the Australian Army
- List of Australian military equipment of World War II
- Historical weaponry of the Australian Army
- List of aircraft of the Royal Australian Air Force
- List of aircraft of the Royal Australian Navy
