= Army Aviation Command (Australia) =

Aviation command of the Australian Army

- Active: November 2024 – present
- Country: Australia
- Branch: Australian Army
- Part of: Chief of Army
- Garrison/HQ: Canberra

Commanders
- Current commander: Major General David Hafner

Insignia
- Patch: Light blue and navy with red kangaroo

Aircraft flown
- Helicopter: UH-60M Black Hawk; CH-47F Chinook
- Attack helicopter: ARH Tiger

The Army Aviation Command is the aviation command within the Australian Army responsible for the management and coordination of all army aircraft, as well as the development of future army aviation technology.

== Structure ==
- 16th Aviation Brigade
- Army Aviation Training Centre

== Commander Aviation Command ==
Rank	Name	Postnominals	Term began	Term ended
Major General	Stephen Jobson	AM	2 December 2021	November 2024
Major General	David Hafner	AM, CSC	November 2024	Incumbent

== See also ==
- Australian Army Aviation
- United Kingdom Joint Helicopter Command
- Current senior Australian Defence Organisation personnel
