= 5th Aviation Regiment (Australia) =

Australian Army unit

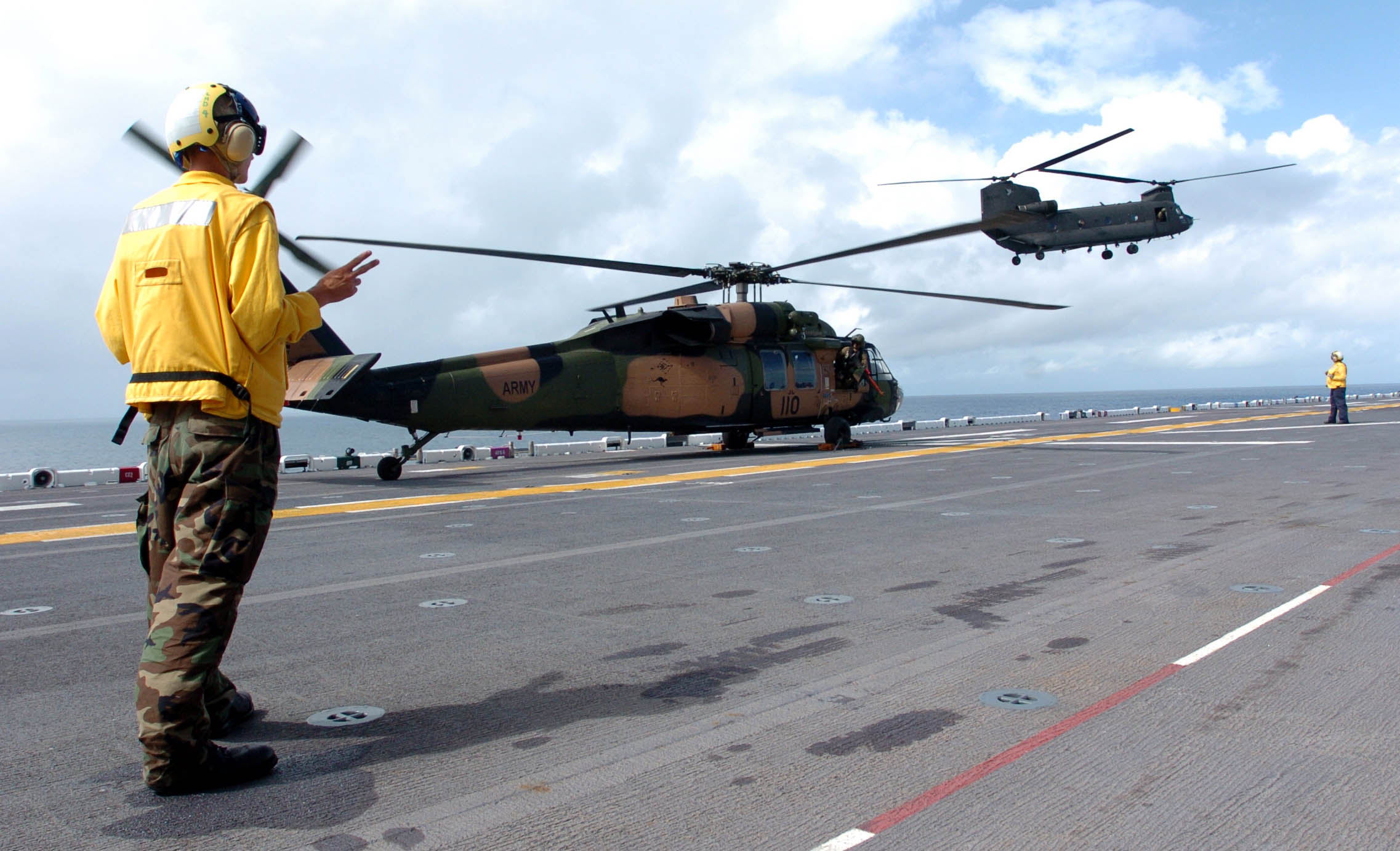
- A S-70A Black Hawk and a CH-47D Chinook from the 5th Aviation Regiment, operating on US Navy amphibious assault ship USS Boxer (LHD-4) during Exercise Talisman Saber, 2005.
- Active: 1987 – present
- Country: Australia
- Branch: Australian Army
- Type: Aviation
- Role: Transport
- Part of: 16th Aviation Brigade
- Garrison/HQ: RAAF Base Townsville, Townsville
- Engagements: Cambodia; East Timor; Iraq; Afghanistan
- Decorations: Meritorious Unit Citation

Commanders
- Notable commanders: Angus Houston

Insignia
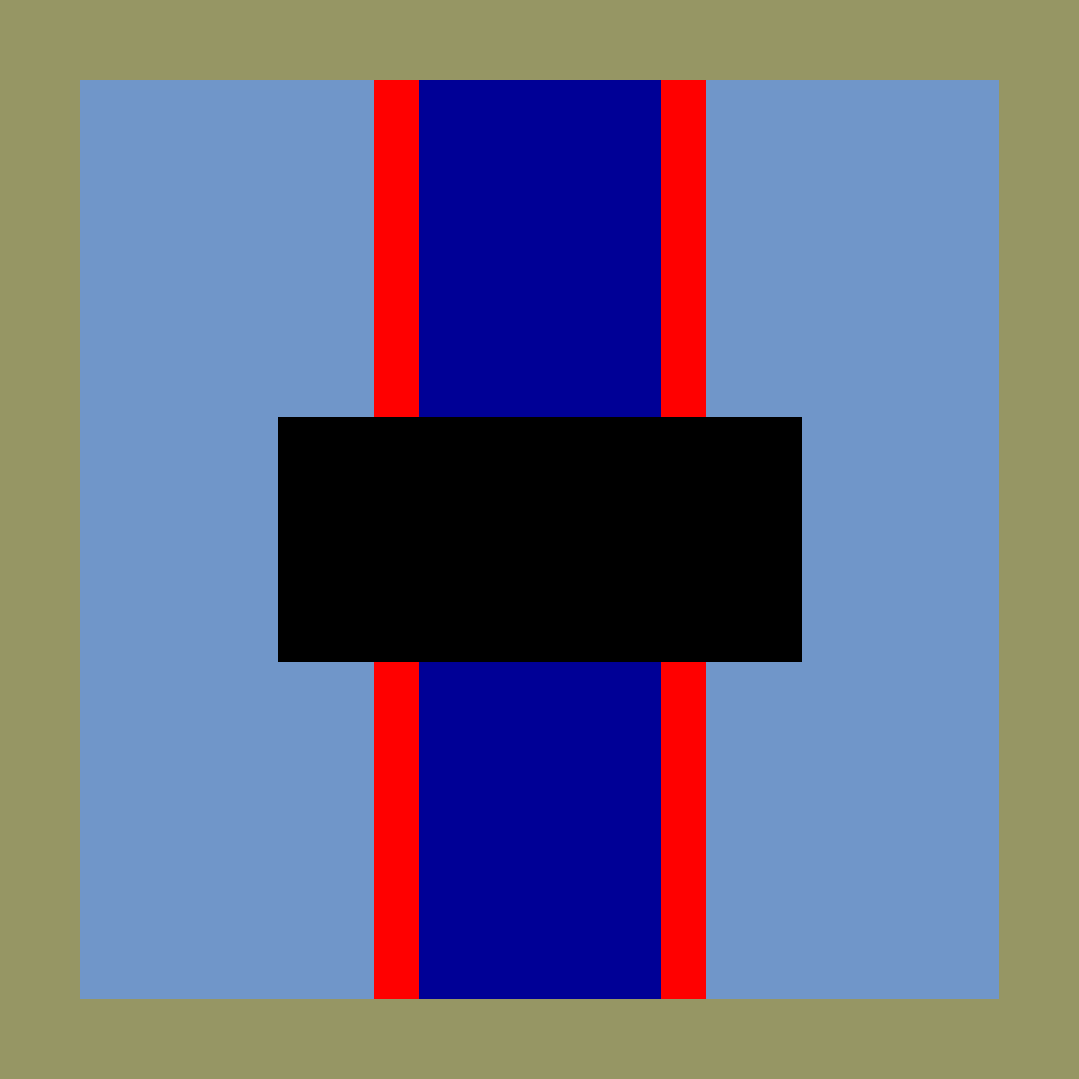
- Unit colour patch

Aircraft flown
- Helicopter: CH-47F Chinook; UH-60M Black Hawk; H135T3

The 5th Aviation Regiment (5 Avn Regt) is an Australian Army aviation unit. Formed in 1987 after the Army took over responsibility for operating helicopters from the Royal Australian Air Force, the regiment is based at RAAF Base Townsville, Queensland. It currently forms part of the 16th Aviation Brigade and it operates the majority of the Army's transport helicopters. Throughout its existence, the regiment has been deployed overseas numerous times, supporting both peacekeeping and warlike operations. Since its formation, elements of the regiment have made operational deployments to Cambodia, Papua New Guinea, East Timor, Iraq, Indonesia and Pakistan.

== History ==
The Regiment was formed in 1987 at RAAF Base Townsville, North Queensland.

=== Cambodia ===
In May 1993, six Black Hawks and 109 personnel from 'B' Squadron were deployed to Battambang airport in north-west Cambodia, forming the Army Aviation Group deployed in support of the United Nations peacekeeping mission in that country. The aircraft were painted in UN white and fitted with armour plating and door mounted machine guns for the operation due to the threat of ground fire. They were subsequently used to resupply UN positions along the Thai-Laos border, as well as the transportation of electoral officials and ballot boxes, and for aeromedical evacuation. The helicopters were fired on at least three times, with one receiving minor damage from small arms fire. They returned to Townsville in July 1993.

=== Black Hawk crash ===
On the evening of 12 June 1996, two Black Hawk helicopters from the regiment carrying soldiers from the Special Air Service Regiment (SASR) collided during an exercise at the High Range Training Area near Townsville. The activity took place sometime after 18:30, requiring the pilots to use night vision goggles. Six aircraft had been approaching the target area, when 30 seconds from the landing zone, one of the helicopters veered to the right, clipping the tail rotor of another helicopter. One Black Hawk crashed immediately, while the other was able to make a crash landing but burst into flames. Fifteen members of the SASR and three from the 5th Aviation Regiment lost their lives in the accident.

=== International Force East Timor ===
In September 1999, the regiment deployed 12 Black Hawks as part of the Australian-led International Force East Timor (INTERFET), flying directly into Dili from Darwin on the second day of the operation to provide airlift and limited aerial fire support to the force on the ground. The detachment was initially based at the Dili Heliport, but was redeployed to Balibo in July 2000 following the transition to the UN mission. In April 2002 it moved again, this time to Moleana. By 2004, the regiment provided a 24-hour aeromedical evacuation capability in support of the Australian infantry battalion deployed along the East Timor-Indonesian border, as well as the insertion and extraction of reaction forces. Two years after being withdrawn, eight Black Hawks were deployed to East Timor in May 2006 as part of Operation Astute as a result of the deteriorating situation in the country.

=== Global war on terror ===
Between March and May 2003, a detachment from 'C' Squadron of three CH-47 Chinooks supported the Special Forces Task Group provided airlift to other coalition forces as part of the Australian force deployed during the 2003 invasion of Iraq. In late 2003, 'A' Squadron and the UH-1 equipped 171st Squadron swapped designations, with the former 'A' Squadron becoming an independent squadron supporting Special Operations Command. The 'new' (UH-1 equipped) 'A' Squadron was subsequently re-equipped with 12 MRH-90 medium helicopters, while it was planned that 'B' Squadron would also be equipped with these aircraft by 2015.

Later, a detachment of two CH-47 Chinook helicopters from the regiment was deployed to Afghanistan between late March 2006 and April 2007. In early 2008, two Chinooks were deployed with Rotary Wing Group 1 (RWG 1) and then again with Rotary Wing Group 2 (RWG 2) in June 2008 as part of Operation Slipper where they took part in combat operations. These operations continued in 2009 and 2010.

On 30 May 2011, a Chinook from C Squadron crashed while operating in Afghanistan. The aircraft was conducting a re-supply mission in company with a US Army Chinook in Zabul Province when it crashed, injuring six personnel on board. The most seriously wounded, passenger Lieutenant Marcus Case, was evacuated by the accompanying US Army helicopter but later died of his injuries. He was an Australian Army pilot deployed with No. 5 Flight RAAF at Kandahar. The other five injured survived the crash and were evacuated to Kandahar. The helicopter, a CH-47D (ADF serial A15-102) attached to the US Army 159th Combat Aviation Brigade at Kandahar, was assessed as being unrecoverable and was subsequently destroyed at the site of the crash. There was no insurgent activity at the time of the crash, and enemy fire was ruled out as a contributing cause. The eleventh, and final, deployment of Chinooks to Afghanistan was completed on 14 September 2013. In June 2014, all six of the regiment's Chinooks flew together for the first time in 19 years.

=== Humanitarian assistance ===
Following the 2005 Kashmir earthquake, a detachment of Black Hawks were sent to Pakistan to assist the ADF medical team deployed there and provide humanitarian assistance to remote villages.

Three Black Hawks helped distribute aid to victims of flooding in Oro Province, Papua New Guinea in late 2007 as part of Operation Papua New Guinea Assist.

In 2016, MRH-90s from A Squadron deployed on HMAS Canberra to Fiji to provide disaster relief following Tropical Cyclone Winston. That year, the regiment reached a total of ten CH-47F models to replace the old D models, the first seven having arrived the previous year to replace six D models.

In 2018, A Squadron deployed on HMAS Adelaide to Papua New Guinea for the APEC Papua New Guinea 2018 international conference to help with security for international delegates.

In January 2019, 5th Aviation Regiment was activated to assist with the 2019 Townsville flood and also flooding in the wider North Queensland region. Then in March, B Squadron deployed in support of the 2019 Solomon Islands general election, providing security assistance to local police and election officials.

In late 2019 and the beginning of 2020, 5th Aviation Regiment deployed throughout Eastern Australia to assist the civil authority in response to the 2019–20 Australian bushfire season. Both MRH-90 and Chinook operated in support of civil organisations such as the New South Wales Rural Fire Service. One of the regiment's helicopters started what developed into a major bushfire near Canberra when its landing light ignited dry grass. The helicopter was damaged, and its crew did not report the location of the fire during their 45 minute flight to Canberra Airport.

In early 2021, A Squadron MRH-90s returned to Fiji in the wake of Cyclone Yasa and 'flew more than 166 hours, delivering 71,475kg of aid through 62 vertical replenishments, as well as troops, to communities across Vanua Levu and outlying islands'.

=== Changes to equipment ===
From 1987, the Regiment operated the S-70A-9 Black Hawk and UH-1 Iroquois helicopters which had previously been operated by the Royal Australian Air Force (RAAF) following the decision to transfer these assets to the Australian Army. In 1989, No. 9 Squadron RAAF (S-70A) became the regiment's 'A' Squadron and No. 35 Squadron RAAF (UH-1) became 'B' Squadron. 'B' Squadron was later re-equipped with Black Hawks. The regiment was subsequently expanded in 1995 when 'C' Squadron was formed to operate CH-47 Chinook and UH-1 Iroquois helicopters (the later in the aerial fire support role). The Iroquois helicopters were transferred to the 1st Aviation Regiment in 1998. In August 2014, the regiment transferred the last of its Black Hawk helicopters to the 6th Aviation Regiment based at Holsworthy in Sydney. First A Squadron, and then B Squadron, re-equipped with the NHIndustries MRH-90 Taipan.

Throughout 2020, a solution was sought by 5th Aviation Regiment to address aircrew flying currency. An interim helicopter was sought to supplement the Regiment's fleet. The AgustaWestland AW139 was selected for this role, the first of which was delivered in May 2021.

In July 2021, the first two Chinooks of an additional four that were purchased were delivered from the United States in a C-5 Galaxy 'as part of a half-billion-dollar boost to its fleet of heavy-lift helicopters'.

In December 2021, the Australian Government announced that the army's entire MRH-90 Taipan fleet would be replaced buy up to 40 Black Hawks. Defence Minister Peter Dutton noted that the fleet of Taipan MRH-90 helicopters had not performed to contractual standards and were not performing as hoped. The helicopters have been riddled with performance issues, including several fleet-wide groundings due to technical issues.

In January 2023, the Australian Government ordered 40 UH-60M Black Hawks. These helicopters will be based at Oakey, Queensland and Holsworthy, New South Wales, with the 5th Aviation Regiment's two previously Taipan-equipped squadrons relocating from Townsville. The first UH-60Ms were delivered to the army in July 2023.

In 2024, the Australian Government announced that it would lease 5 Airbus H135T3 helicopters from the United Kingdom Ministry of Defence for five years to maintain "essential training requirements" for army pilots. The helicopters are designated Juno HT.1s in the UK. In December 2024, the army commenced operating the H135s which replaced 3 AW139s leased from Toll in Quarter 2, 2025.

== Current structure ==
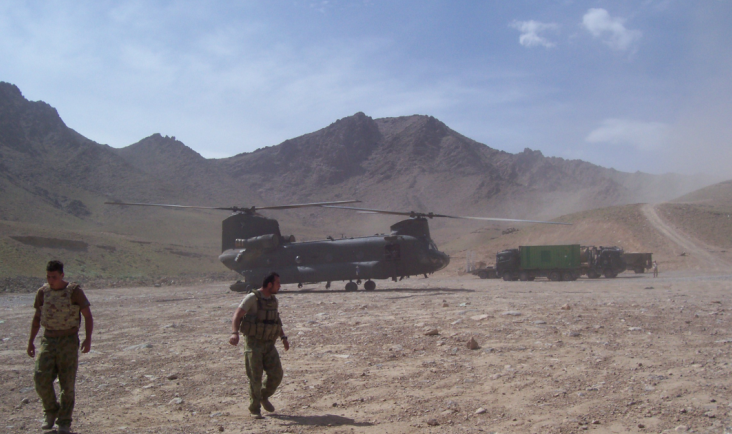
C Sqn, 5th Aviation Regiment CH-47D landing at an Australian patrol base in the Chora Valley, Afghanistan April 2010.

The 5th Aviation Regiment currently consists of:

- Headquarters Squadron
- A Squadron
- B Squadron (UH-60M)
- C Squadron (CH-47F Chinook)
- Technical Support Squadron
- Logistic Support Squadron

== See also ==
- Boeing CH-47 Chinook in Australian service
