= Operation Papua New Guinea Assist =

Australian humanitarian effort in 2007

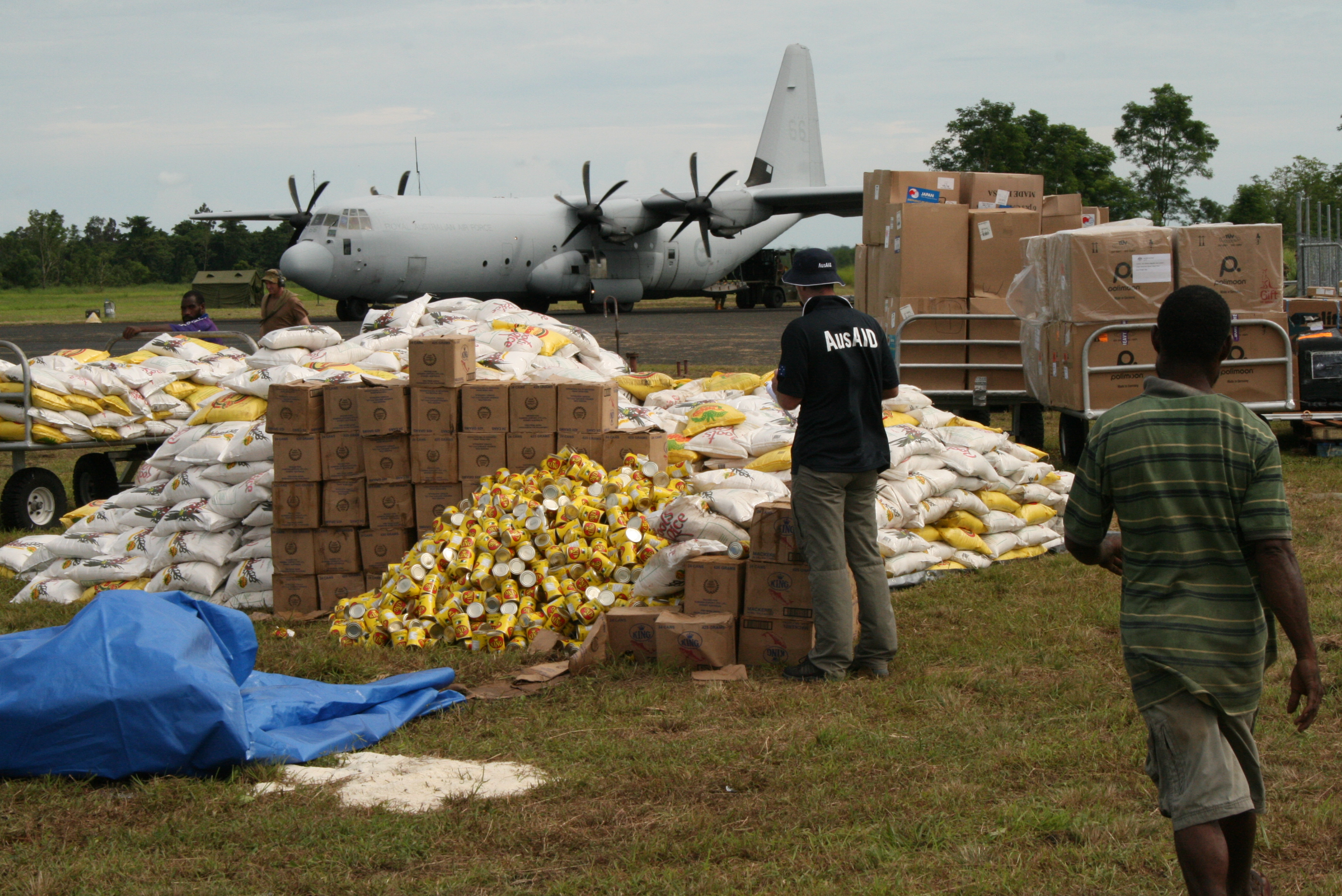

Operation Papua New Guinea Assist was the Australian Defence Force's contribution to the Australian humanitarian effort in Oro Province, Papua New Guinea following heavy flooding caused by Cyclone Guba in November 2007. The humanitarian effort was being led by AusAID and the ADF provided logistical support. The first ADF units involved in this operation deployed to Papua New Guinea on 21 November 2007 following a request from the PNG government. The operation was completed early December 2007.

The ADF force was designated Joint Task Force 636 and was led by Group Captain Tim Innes. The force had a strength of about 170 personnel and involved the following ADF units:

- A small ADF support and command element
- Two C-130 Hercules from No. 37 Squadron RAAF
- One C-17 Globemaster III from No. 36 Squadron RAAF
- Three DHC-4 Caribou from No. 38 Squadron RAAF
- HMAS Wewak
- One Beechcraft Super King Air from the 173rd Surveillance Squadron
- Three S-70A Blackhawks from B Squadron, 5th Aviation Regiment
- Navy clearance divers
- A health assessment team from 1st Health Support Battalion
- An engineering team
