= 427 Special Operations Aviation Squadron =

Canadian military flying unit

- 427^{e} Escadron d'opérations spéciales d'aviation (French)
- Active: 1944–1946; 1952–1970; 1971–present
- Country: Canada
- Type: Special operations helicopter squadron
- Part of: Canadian Special Operations Forces Command
- Garrison/HQ: Garrison Petawawa
- Nickname: Lion Squadron
- Motto: Ferte manus certas (Latin for 'Strike with a sure hand')
- Engagements: World War II; Operation Deliverance; War in Afghanistan; Operation Impact
- Decorations: Distinguished Service Order; Conspicuous Gallantry Medal; Distinguished Flying Medal; Distinguished Flying Cross
- Battle honours: See § Battle honours
- Website: www.canada.ca/en/special-operations-forces-command/corporate/organizational-structure/427-so-aviation-squadron.html

427 Special Operations Aviation Squadron (427 SOAS) (French: 427^{e} Escadron d'opérations spéciales d'aviation, 427 EOSA) is a tactical helicopter unit that provides aviation support to Canadian Special Operations Forces Command. The squadron is based at Garrison Petawawa (CFB Petawawa), Ontario with a fleet of Bell CH-146 Griffon helicopters. It was founded during the Second World War as No. 427 Squadron RCAF.

== History ==
427 Squadron started as a Royal Canadian Air Force (RCAF) bomber squadron formed at Croft, England on 7 November 1942 and spent its wartime entirely in England as a part of No. 6 Group RCAF, part of the Royal Air Force (RAF) Bomber Command. 427 flew Vickers Wellingtons, the Mk IIIs and Mk Xs, from its first operational mission on 14 December 1942, a minelaying sortie to the Frisian Islands, until May 1943 when it was relocated to Leeming, North Yorkshire. Re-equipped with Handley Page Halifax Mk V aircraft, the squadron flew intensely until early 1944 when it replaced its inventory with Halifax Mk III aircraft. This fleet saw the greatest number of missions and in slightly more than a year's time they were then replaced by Avro Lancaster bombers prior to the end of the Second World War. The Lancasters were used for prisoner of war repatriation until the end of May 1946. 427 Squadron was stood down on 1 June 1946.

The squadron was reformed on 1 August 1952 at RCAF Station St. Hubert (Saint-Hubert is a borough in the city of Longueuil, Quebec) as 427 Fighter Squadron, flying Canadair Sabres, and was transferred to No. 3 (Fighter) Wing at Zweibrücken in March 1953. Selected as the first European RCAF squadron to receive the Canadair CF-104 Starfighter for the nuclear strike role, the squadron was stood down from its day-fighter role on 15 December 1962 and reformed as 427 (Strike-Attack) Squadron two days later.

On 1 February 1968, unification of the Canadian Armed Forces integrated 427 Squadron into the new Canadian Armed Forces. The squadron was again disbanded on 1 July 1970.

427 Squadron came back into existence as 427 Tactical Helicopter Squadron at Garrison Petawawa, where it remains today.

The squadron has also taken an active role in humanitarian efforts such as the January 1998 ice storm in eastern Canada, where the squadron deployed eight aircraft to Ottawa and Kingston, and the November 1998 mission to help the victims of Hurricane Mitch. With only 24 hours' notice, four 427 Squadron Bell CH-146 Griffons deployed to La Ceiba, Honduras. Once in the country, Griffon crews airlifted medical teams into communities cut off by the hurricane. For the next six weeks, the squadron ferried supplies and aid workers to many isolated towns and villages.

On 1 February 2006, command of 427 Squadron was transferred to Canadian Special Operations Forces Command, as it took on a full-time role of special operations aviation support. Shortly thereafter, it was renamed 427 Special Operations Aviation Squadron (427 SOAS). Qualified tactical aviators selected by 427 SOAS must complete SOTAC (Special Operation Tactical Aviation Course), which runs for approximately four months.

The squadron has a dedicated concrete helipad, measuring 150 ft × 150 ft (46 m × 46 m), at Petawawa Heliport.

== Aircraft flown by 427 Squadron ==
=== Historic aircraft ===
Historical fleet
| Aircraft | Variants | Operational period | Notes |
|---|---|---|---|
| Vickers Wellington | Mk.III | November 1942 – March 1943 | |
| Vickers Wellington | Mk Xs | February 1942 – May 1943 | |
| Handley Page Halifax | Mk.V | May 1943 – February 1944 | |
| Handley Page Halifax | Halifax Mk III | January 1944 – March 1945 | |
| Avro Lancaster | Mk.I, Mk.III | March 1945 – May 1946 | |
| Canadair Sabre | Mk.2 | September 1952 – June 1953 | |
| Canadair Sabre | Mk.5 | May 1953 – September 1955 | |
| Canadair Sabre | Mk.6 | September 1955 – December 1962 | |
| Canadair CF-104 Starfighter | | December 1962 – 1970 | |
| Cessna L-19 Bird Dog | | January 1971 – | |
| Bell Twin Huey | CH-135 Twin Huey | 1992 – July 1997 | |
| Bell Kiowa | CH-136 Kiowa | | |
| Mil Mi-17 | Mil CH-178 | 2010 – 2011 | (Note: Mi-17V-5s leased from Russia for use in Afghanistan.) |

=== Current aircraft ===
Current fleet
| Aircraft | Variants | Operational period | Notes |
|---|---|---|---|
| Bell CH-146 Griffon | | December 1996 – present | |
| Beechcraft Super King Air | CE-145C Vigilance (350ER) | April 2024 – present | |

== Battle honours ==
Battle honours in small capitals are for large operations and campaigns and those in lowercase are for more specific battles. 427 Squadron was awarded the following battle honours, which are carried on their standard:

- English Channel and North Sea, 1943–1945
- Baltic, 1944–1945
- Fortress Europe, 1943–1944
- France and Germany, 1944–1945
- Biscay Ports, 1943–1944
- Ruhr, 1943–1945
- Berlin, 1943–1944
- German Ports, 1943–1945
- Normandy, 1944
- Rhine
- Biscay, 1944
- Afghanistan

== See also ==
- Canadian Special Operations Regiment
- Joint Task Force 2
- List of Royal Canadian Air Force squadrons

Similar units in other armed forces

- 4th Special Forces Helicopter Regiment (French)
- 3rd Special Operations Helicopter Regiment "Aldebaran" (Italian)
- 160th Special Operations Aviation Regiment (Airborne) (American)
- 171st Special Operations Aviation Squadron (Australian)
- Joint Special Forces Aviation Wing (British)
