= 4th Special Forces Helicopter Regiment =

- 4^{e} Régiment d'Hélicoptères des Forces Spéciales
- Logo of 4th Special Forces Helicopter Regiment
- Founded: 1993 – present
- Country: France
- Branch: French Army
- Type: Special operations
- Size: 455 authorized personnel
- Part of: French Army Special Forces Command
- Headquarters: Pau

Commanders
- Current commander: Colonel Hoff

The 4^{e} Régiment d'Hélicoptères des Forces Spéciales (English: 4th Special Forces Helicopter Regiment) or 4^{e} RHFS is the special operations unit of the French Army Light Aviation. It is part of the French Army Special Forces Command, therefore of the Special Operations Command. It is based in Pau.

Created in 1997, the 4^{e} RHFS' mission is to transport and provide air support to the other special forces units anywhere in the world.

== Organization ==
The regiment is divided into Special Forces Flights (Escadrilles des Operations Speciales):

- EOS 1 – Puma and Cougar
- EOS 2 – Gazelle
- EOS 3 – Caracals
- EOS 4/GIH – Pumas
- EOS 6 – Tigre
- EOS 7 – Support Flight
- EOS 8 – Helicopter Maintenance Flight

The regiment employs the following helicopters in 2016:

- 10 Eurcopter AS532 UL/AL Cougar
- 12 Aérospatiale Gazelle
- 7 Eurocopter AS332 Super Puma and Aérospatiale SA 330 Puma
- 6 Eurocopter Tigre HAD
- ? Eurocopter EC725 Caracal

== See also ==
- Italian 3rd Special Operations Helicopter Regiment
- U.S. 160th Special Operations Aviation Regiment - Night Stalkers
- Australian 171st Special Operations Aviation Squadron
- British Joint Special Forces Aviation Wing
- Canadian 427 Special Operations Aviation Squadron
