= No. 16 Army Light Aircraft Squadron (Australia) =

- Active: 1960–66
- Country: Australia
- Branch: Australian Army
- Role: Army support

Aircraft flown
- Helicopter: Bell Sioux
- Reconnaissance: Cessna 180

No. 16 Army Light Aircraft Squadron was formed on 1 December 1960 as a joint Australian Army and Royal Australian Air Force unit at RAAF Base Amberley in Queensland. Tasked with the provision of light aircraft support to Army formations, the squadron was equipped with Cessna 180 light aircraft and Bell Sioux helicopters. A detachment of two float-equipped helicopters from the squadron was deployed to West New Guinea in November 1962 in support of the United Nations Temporary Executive Authority (UNTEA), following an outbreak of cholera there. Although one helicopter was lost in an accident, the detachment’s tasks were successfully completed and it returned to Australia in late December. In April 1966 the squadron was expanded to become the Army's 1st Aviation Regiment.
