= Luscombe Airfield =

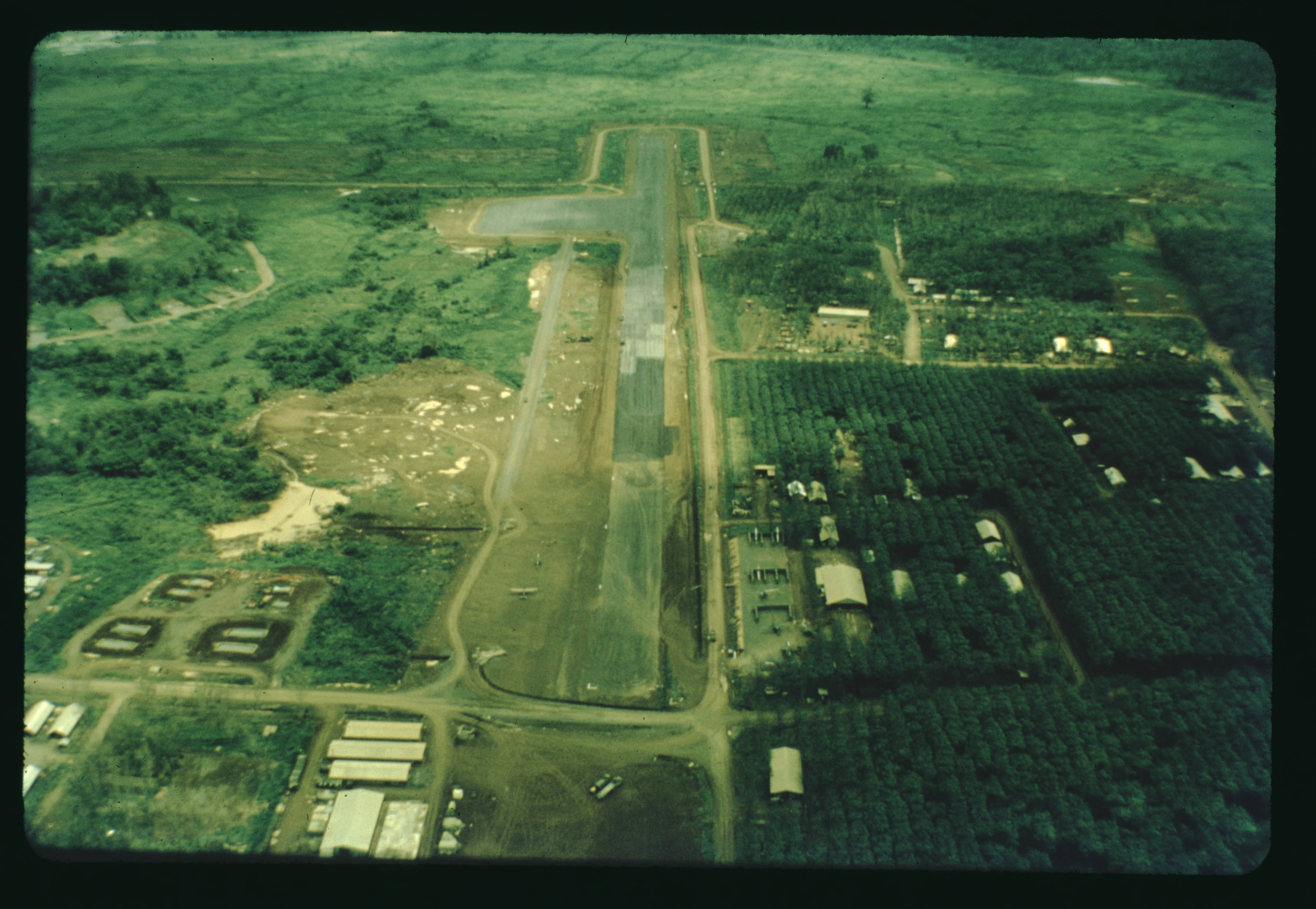
Luscombe Airfield, 26 July 1968

Luscombe Airfield or Nui Dat Camp was an airfield at Nui Dat, Phước Tuy province, South Vietnam (now in Bà Rịa–Vũng Tàu province, Vietnam). The airfield was built by 1 Field Squadron, Royal Australian Engineers for the 1st Australian Task Force at Nui Dat. The airfield was opened on 5 December 1966 and named in honour of Captain Bryan Luscombe, who had been killed in action during the Korean War on 5 June 1952.

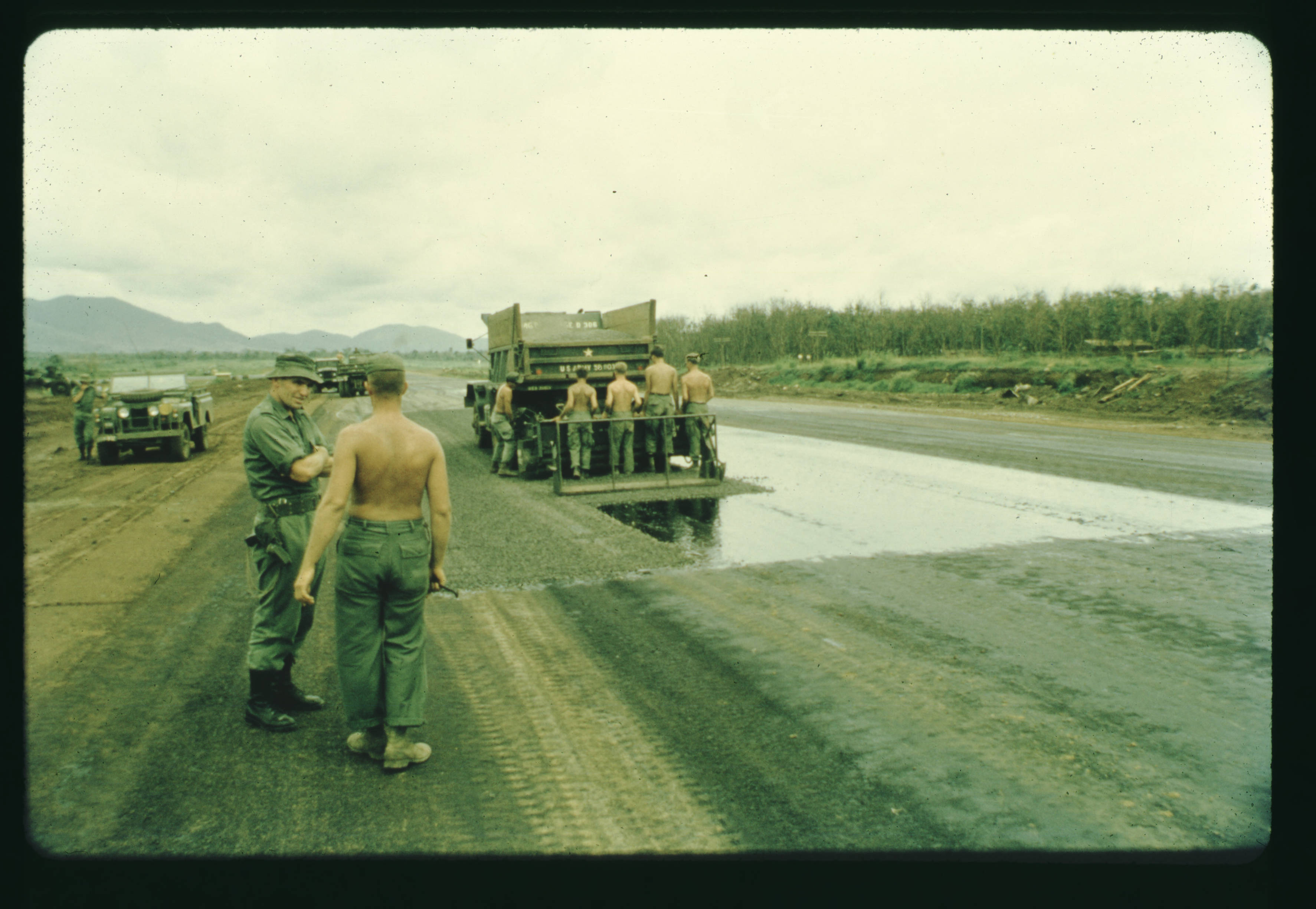
Airfield resurfacing, 26 July 1968
