= Robertson Barracks =

Australian Army base in Holtze

- Knuckey Lagoon; Municipality of Litchfield; Northern Territory
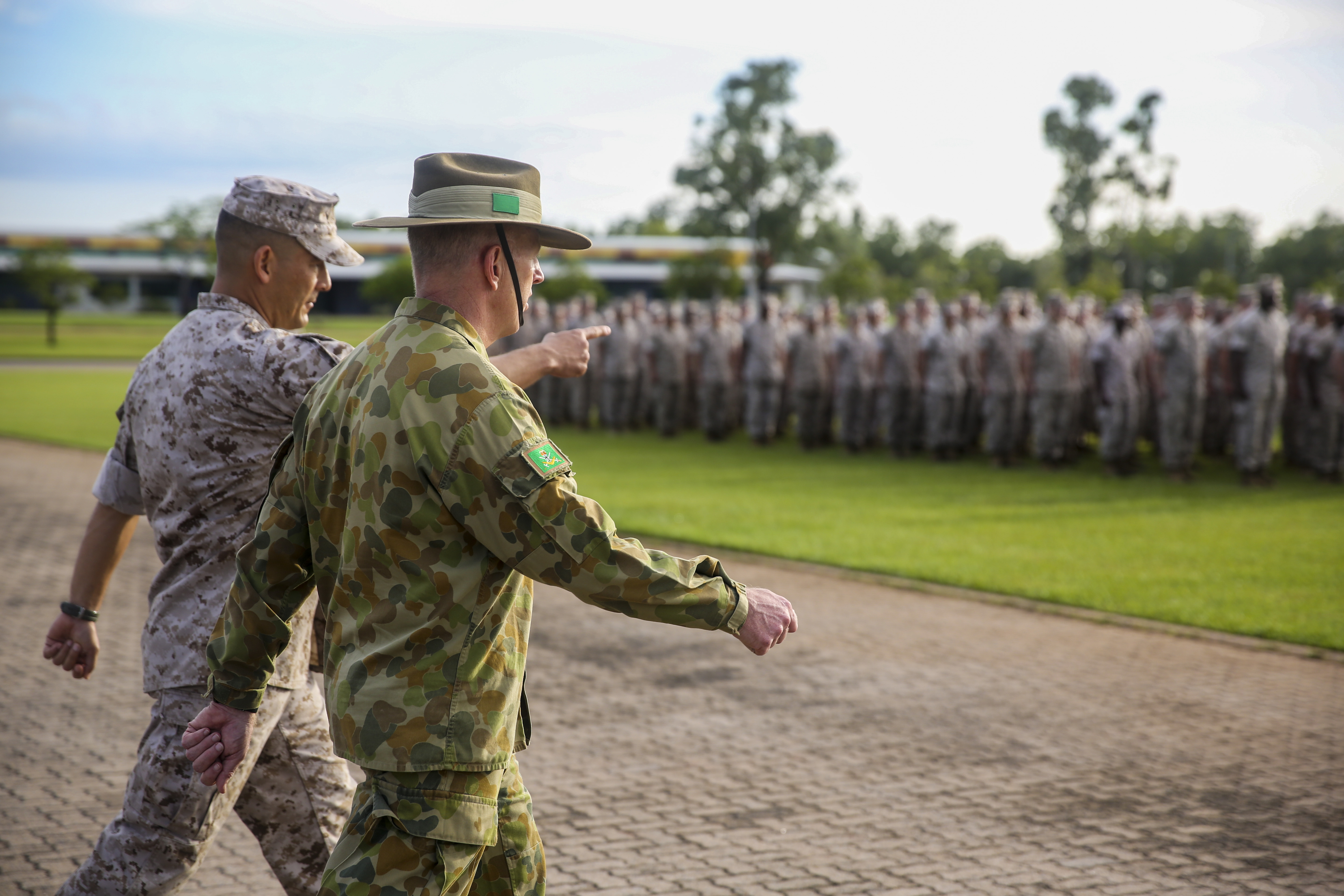
- Brigadier John Frewen inspects MRF-D personnel, 2014

Site information
- Type: Australian Army base
- Owner: Australia
- Controlled by: Australia

Location
- Coordinates: 12°26′42″S 130°58′28″E

Site history
- Built: 1989–2001

Garrison information
- Garrison: (Australia) 1st Brigade (Australia) 1st Aviation Regiment (Australia) B Coy, 1st Military Police Battalion (Australia) Joint Movements Control Office – Darwin (Australia) Joint Logistics Unit (North); United States Pacific Command; Marine air-ground combined arms force

Airfield information
- Identifiers: ICAO: YRBK
- Elevation: 32 m (105 ft) AMSL

Robertson Barracks is a major Australian Army base located in Holtze, an outer suburb of Darwin, Northern Territory, around 15 km (9.3 mi) east of the Darwin city centre.

== History ==
Robertson Barracks was built between 1989 and 2001.

The barracks was named after Lieutenant General Sir Horace Robertson, commander of the 1st Armoured Division and 6th Division during the Second World War, and later Commander in Chief British Commonwealth Occupation Force in Japan.

The "Atomic Tank" was a Centurion tank which was placed 500 m (1,600 ft) from ground zero of a 10Kt atomic bomb test at Woomera in 1953. It was damaged but still driveable, was repaired and served in Vietnam, before being used as a "gate guardian" at Robertson Barracks.

In 2021, prime minister Scott Morrison visited Robertson Barracks, where he announced expenditure of A$747 million to upgrade the Robertson Barracks Close Training Area, Kangaroo Flats Training Area, Mount Bundey Training Area and Bradshaw Field Training Area. This was part of a total of A$8 billion allocated for spending on defence installations in the Northern Territory.

== Description ==
Robertson Barracks is a major Australian Army base in Holtze, a suburb of Darwin in the Municipality of Litchfield, about 15 km (9.3 mi) east of the Darwin city centre.

Robertson Barracks are home to the 1st Brigade and the 1st Aviation Regiment. It has a helicopter airfield, similar to Holsworthy Barracks.

== Units ==
The units currently located on Robertson Barracks are:

=== 1 Brigade units ===
- 1st Combat Service Support Battalion
- 1st Combat Signals Regiment
- 1st Combat Engineer Regiment
- 5th/7th Battalion, Royal Australian Regiment
- 8th/12th Regiment, Royal Australian Artillery

=== External units ===
- 1st Aviation Regiment
- B Coy, 1st Military Police Battalion
- Joint Movements Control Office – Darwin
- Joint Logistics Unit (North)
- 1st Close Health Battalion (Headquarters)
  - 8th Close Health Company

== US Marines ==
In 2011 as part of the Obama administration's "pivot to Asia" it was announced that US Marines would be based in Darwin at the Robertson Barracks. In November 2011 it was announced that up to 2,500 US Marines would be based in Australia for training, starting from 200 to 250 in 2012, to 2500 over the following five years. The Marine groups were to stay for six months at a time.

Robertson Barracks is reported to be a future site of a United States Pacific Command, Marine Rotational Force-Darwin (MRF-D), and its current capacity of 4,500 troops will be upgraded in the near future. Currently, the size and the accessibility of key facilities in Darwin follows closely with other US deployment sites around the globe.

In 2016, 1,250 US Marines deployed to Robertson Barracks, along with four UH-1Y Venom helicopters.

Drawn-out negotiations over cost-sharing and other issues meant that the original number of 2,500 Marines per deployment would not be reached until at least 2020.

As of February 2024, it was reported that up to 2,500 Marines had been stationed at Darwin each year.
