= 173rd Special Operations Aviation Squadron =

- Active: 1974–present
- Country: Australia
- Branch: Australian Army
- Type: Training
- Role: Special operations aviation
- Size: One squadron
- Part of: 6th Aviation Regiment
- Garrison/HQ: Holsworthy Barracks

Aircraft flown
- Helicopter: UH-60M Black Hawk (Note: The Army received the first three UH-60Ms in August 2023 from an order of 40 UH-60Ms.)

The 173rd Special Operations Aviation Squadron (173 SOAS) is an Australian Army helicopter training squadron that provides support to the Special Operations Command. The squadron is being equipped with UH-60M Black Hawk helicopters. The squadron is based at Luscombe Airfield, Holsworthy Barracks, Sydney and forms part of the 6th Aviation Regiment.

The squadron originally operated fixed-wing aircraft designated as the 173rd General Support Squadron and was later renamed the 173rd Surveillance Squadron. In 2010, the squadron was renamed the 173rd Aviation Squadron when it transitioned to rotary aircraft and was later renamed the 173rd Special Operations Aviation Squadron.

== History ==
On 17 February 1974, the 173rd General Support Squadron was formed as part of the 1st Aviation Regiment based at Oakey and initially operated 6 Pilatus PC-6 Porters. In 1978, the squadron also received 11 GAF Nomad aircraft. During this time, the squadron undertook a variety of Army co-operation roles utilising the short take-off and landing characteristics of its aircraft. These included: artillery spotting, troop transport, field resupply, medevac, ground-air liaison. It was also used for survey work in the South Pacific and flood relief in Australia. In 1978, the squadron was involved in Operation Cenderawasih a mapping program in Irian Jaya in Indonesia with the Indonesian Army.

With the retirement of the Porters in October 1992, the following year the squadron adopted the title of "173rd Surveillance Squadron" under this guise it undertook the aerial surveillance and survey roles and was also used as a vehicle to deliver parachute troops. In 1993, it acquired 12 more Nomads, mainly unsold civilian variants which had been kept in storage, to replace the Porters.

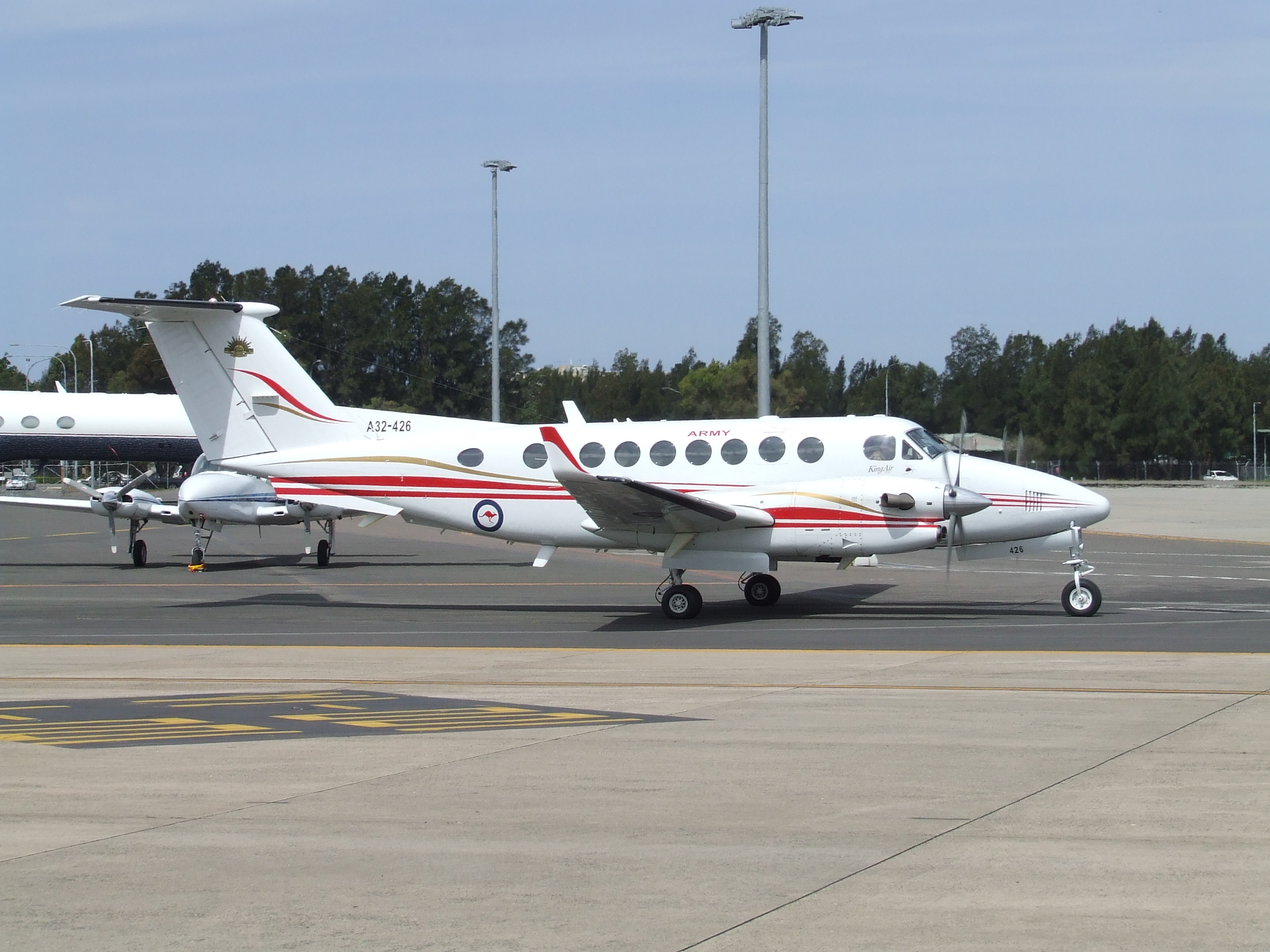
A King Air B350 at Kingsford Smith International Airport in 2006

In August 1995, following the fatal crashes involving Nomads from the Royal Australian Air Force (RAAF) and the School of Army Aviation, the aircraft were withdrawn from service. Most of the Nomad fleet was sold to the Indonesian Navy but two were retained as unflyable training aids.

As a consequence, the squadron operated 4 Embraer EMB 110P1 Bandeirante aircraft leased from Flight West temporarily while a replacement for the Nomad was found. From 1996, these aircraft were replaced with 3 Beechcraft King Air B200 aircraft leased from Hawker Pacific to be based at Oakley and 3 de Havilland Canada DHC-6 Twin Otter 320 aircraft leased from Hawker Pacific to be based in Darwin. On 9 November 1997, Twin Otter VH-HPY was lost in a tropical mountainous training accident in Papua New Guinea, resulting in serious injuries to the three trainees and instructor onboard.

The squadron served in several East Timor operations including INTERFET, UNTAET, UNMISET and Operation Astute. A squadron King Air was the first ADF aircraft to land in Dili ahead of the INTERFET peace-keeping taskforce in 1999.

By 2004, the remaining Twin Otter aircraft based in Darwin had been withdrawn from service, while the King Air B200 was replaced by the more modern King Air B350 variant leased from Hawker Pacific. Restructuring of Army's aviation capability saw the squadron separated from 1st Aviation Regiment and placed under the command of 16th Aviation Brigade as an independent unit.

By 2007, further re-organisation assigned all fixed-wing military aircraft to the RAAF and the squadron was to relocate to Sydney as a helicopter training and surveillance squadron under the newly raised 6th Aviation Regiment. In March 2008, the squadron became part of the 6th Aviation Regiment. On 20 November 2009, the squadron handed the King Air over to the RAAF.

On 11 February 2010, the squadron was renamed as the "173rd Aviation Squadron" and converted to rotary aircraft operating a fleet of Bell 206B-1 Kiowa helicopters. The squadron moved to the recently redeveloped Luscombe Army Airfield where 171st Aviation Squadron was based. The Kiowas were operated to provide training for graduate pilots unable to undertake operational conversions to the delayed MRH 90 Taipan and Tiger ARH helicopters. The Kiowa had been retired on 26 October 2009 from the 1st Aviation Regiment.

In 2013, the squadron transitioned to the S-70A-9 Black Hawk helicopter with the role of providing support to the Special Operations Command and returned the Kiowa to the Army Aviation Training Centre at Oakey.

The squadron has been renamed the "173rd Special Operations Aviation Squadron"; it has had a new name from at least 2017.

In February 2019, the squadron commenced transitioning from the retiring S-70A-9 Black Hawk helicopters to the MRH90 Taipan helicopters with the transition completed in December 2021. In January 2023, the Army announced the MRH90 would be replaced by the UH-60M Black Hawk. In July 2023, a MRH90 fatally crashed while the squadron was participating in exercise Talisman Sabre near Lindeman Island. In September 2023, the MRH90 fleet was retired earlier than planned following the fatal crash. In August 2023, the Army began receiving deliveries of UH-60Ms.

== Bibliography ==
- Eather, Steve (1995). Flying Squadrons of the Australian Defence Force. Weston Creek, Australian Capital Territory: Aerospace Publications. ISBN 1-875671-15-3.
