= 1st Aviation Regiment (Australia) =

Australian Army unit

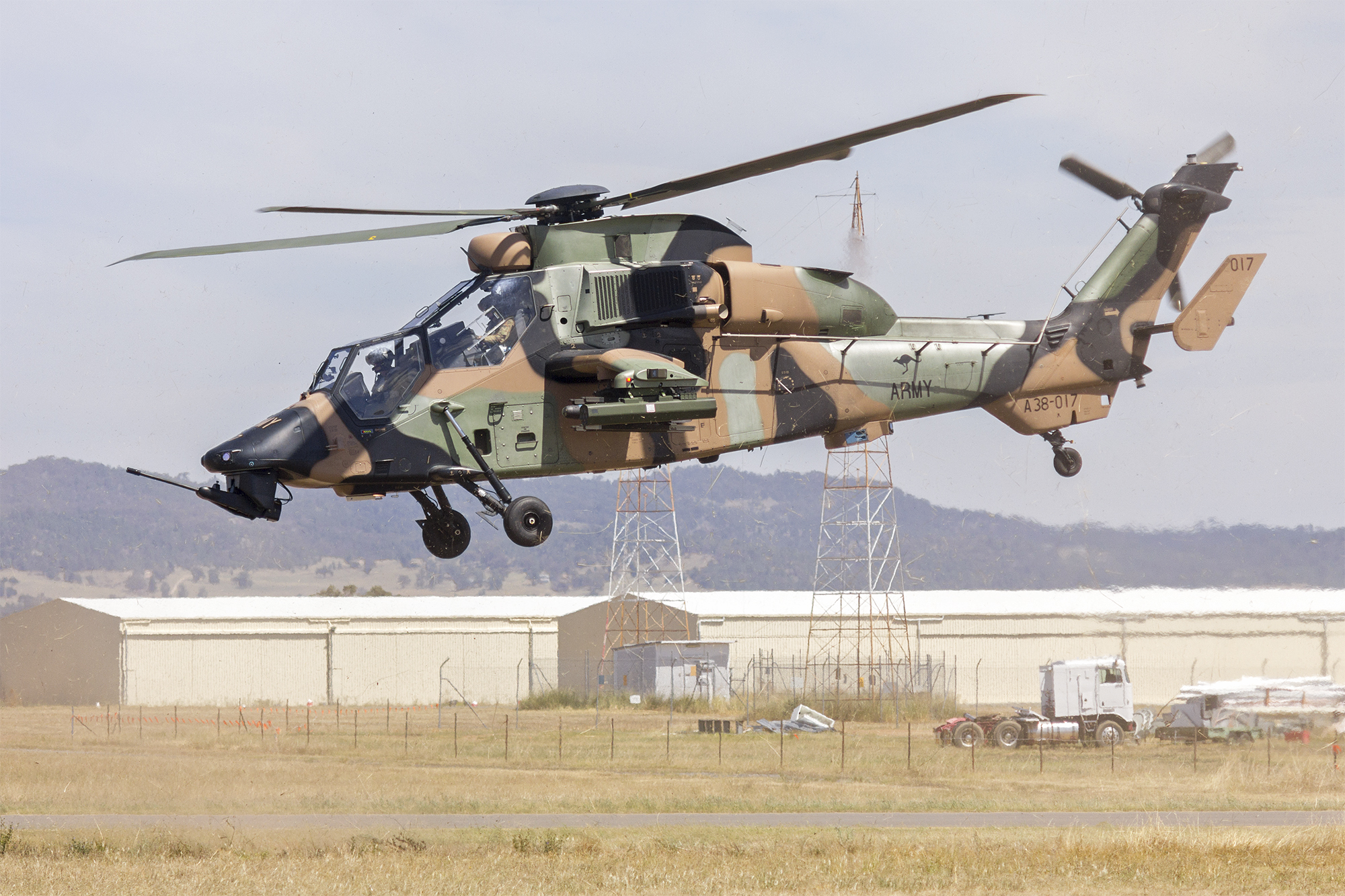
- An Australian Army Tiger ARH
- Active: 1966 – present
- Country: Australia
- Branch: Army
- Type: Aviation
- Role: Attack and reconnaissance
- Size: Regiment
- Part of: 16th Aviation Brigade
- Garrison/HQ: Robertson Barracks, Darwin; RAAF Base Townsville
- Motto: Alert
- Mascots: Sergeant Penny Alert (a peregrine falcon)

Insignia
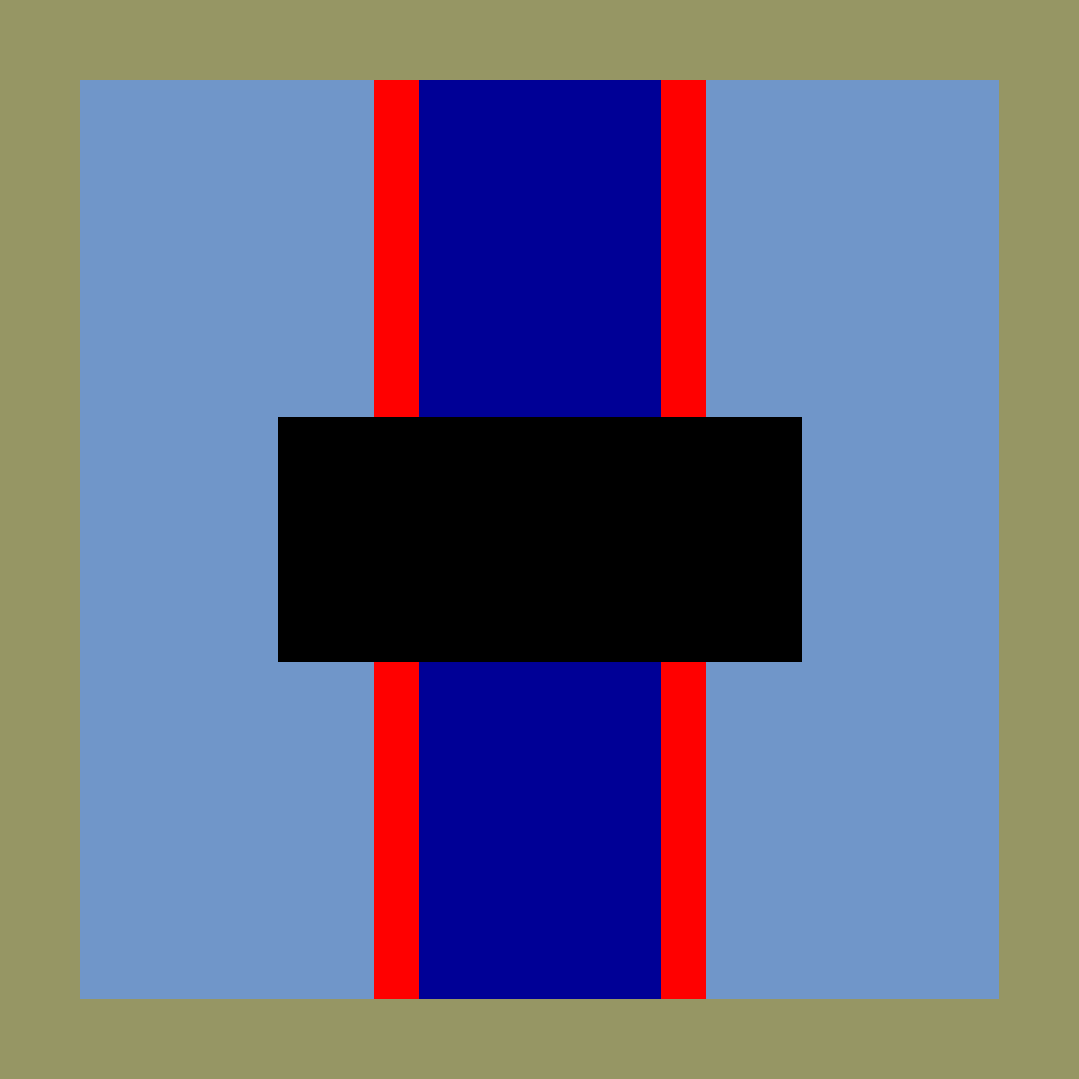
- Unit colour patch

Aircraft flown
- Attack helicopter: Boeing AH-64E Apache Guardian

The 1st Aviation Regiment is one of the Australian Army's three Army Aviation regiments and provides aerial reconnaissance and fire support to the Australian Army. The 1st Aviation Regiment, equipped with Boeing AH-64E Apache Guardian attack helicopters, forms part of the 16th Aviation Brigade and is based at Gaza Lines, Robertson Barracks, Darwin.

== History ==
The Regiment was formed on 26 April 1966 as the 1st Division Army Aviation Regiment and was re-designated the 1st Aviation Regiment on 31 March 1967. The regiment had historically operated a mix of fixed-wing and rotary aircraft. In late 2004, the regiment was re-organised for its new role to operate the Tiger Armed Reconnaissance Helicopter (ARH).

As part of this restructure, 171st Operational Support Squadron and 173rd Surveillance Squadron were placed as direct command units of the 16th Aviation Brigade.

During 2005 and 2006, the regiment consolidated all of the remaining squadrons into one location for the first time, at Gaza Lines, in Darwin's Robertson Barracks.

The Tiger ARH reached its full operational capability on 18 April 2016 with minor caveats. This process took much longer than expected, due in part to the complexity of the helicopters and shortages of spare parts. The 2016 Defence White Paper stated that the Tigers would be retired early, and be replaced with different aircraft during the mid-2020s.

On 15 January 2021, Minister for Defence Linda Reynolds announced that the Boeing AH-64E Apache Guardian had been selected for Project Land 4503 to replace the Tiger ARH. A fleet of 29 Apaches will be acquired with a planned initial operational capability of 12 helicopters in 2026 and full operational capability in 2028. The Defence Strategic Review in April 2023 stated that coinciding with the introduction of the new Apache fleet, the regiment would be relocating to RAAF Base Townsville, where it would be based alongside C Squadron of the 5th Aviation Regiment who operate the CH-47F Chinook.

The regimental headquarters and 161 Reconnaissance Squadron relocated to Townsville in 2025. 162 Reconnaissance Squadron will remain in Darwin until the Tiger helicopters are retired. As of May 2026, 6 Apaches had been delivered. On 30 September 2026, the Tiger ARH fleet was retired from service. All Apaches are expected to be delivered by 2029.

== Current organisation ==
The regiment is currently organised as follows:

- Regimental Headquarters
- 161 Reconnaissance Squadron
- 162 Reconnaissance Squadron
- Operational Support Squadron

== Civil assistance and operations ==
- INTERFET,
- Operations Stabilise/Warden,
- UNTAET & Operation Tanager,
- NSW Flood Assistance,
- Operation Gold (Sydney Olympics),
- UNMISET & Operation Citadel,
- Operation Anode,
- Operation Guardian II,
- Operation Astute.

== Commanding Officers ==
- LTCOL WJ Slocombe - April 1966 - February 1968
- LTCOL RR Harding - February 1986 - September 1969
- LTCOL BH Cooper - November 1972 - December 1975
- LTCOL G Hill-Smith, DFC - December 1975 - October 1978
- LTCOL CT Barnett - December 1980 - December 1983
- LTCOL AJ Fritsch - December 1983 - December 1985
- LTCOL HR Pronk - December 198 - December 1991
- LTCOL BW Millen - January 1992 - October 1993
- LTCOL PJ Neuhaus - November 1993 - December 1994
- LTCOL NJ Crowther - January 1995 - December 1996
- LTCOL AR MacDonald - December 1996 - December 1998
- LTCOL CI Evans - December 1998 - January 2001
- LTCOL PS Smith - January 2001 - December 2002
- LTCOL NA Turton - January 2003 - January 2005
- LTCOL A Jones - January 2006 - January 2007
- LTCOL B Dwyer - August 2007 - December 2009
- LTCOL Fenwick - September 2009 - December 2011
- LTCOL GA Moten - November 2011 - December 2013
- LTCOL D Thompson - January 2014 - January 2016
- LTCOL Hayden Archibald - December 2015 - December 2017
- LTCOL Daniel Bartle - December 2017 - December 2019
- LTCOL Steve Hicks - January 2020 - December 2021
- LTCOL Joel Domigan - January 2022 - December 2023
- LTCOL MN Sherry - January 2024 - December 2025

== Regimental Sergeant Majors ==
- WO1 CC Mils - April 1966 - December 1967
- WO1 GA Way - March 1968 - June 1968
- WO1 RAF Bassett - June 1968 - July 1969
- WO1 WJ Bryson - February 1972 - September 1972
- WO1 J Gordon May 1974 - May 1978
- WO1 RS Hannah - May 1978 - July 1980
- WO1 AP Flanagan - July 1980 - January 1981
- WO1 FV McLean - January 1981 - December 1981
- WO1 RE Smith, OAM - December 1981 - December 1983
- WO1 GA Crowley - December 1983 - December 1985
- WO1 HA King, OAM - December 1985 - December 1986
- WO1 Porter - December 1986 - December 1988
- WO1 GR Neumann - December 1988 - December 1990
- WO1 John. A Lavery - December 1990 - December 1992
- WO1 PC Little - December 1992 - August 1994
- WO1 SJ Fairbrass - September 1994 - December 1996
- WO1 DA Stephens - December 1996 - December 1999
- WO1 JA Merrick - January 2000 - December 2001
- WO1 DJ English - January 2002 - November 2003
- WO1 Kieth R Coggins - December 2003 - December 2005
- WO1 WG Marks - December 2005 - December 2006
- WO1 Paul Richardson - December 2006 - December 2007
- WO1 Wayne Fletcher - January 2008 - December 2009
- WO1 MA Phillips - November 2010 - December 2013
- WO1 LJ Stein - January 2014 - January 2016
- WO1 Shane Gluyas - January 2016 - December 2017
- WO1 N Edwards - January 2017 - December 2019
- WO1 JS Wright - December 2019 - December 2021
- WO1 T Thompson - January 2022 - December 2024
- WO1 BP Read - January 2025 - November 2025
