= Structure of the Australian Army =

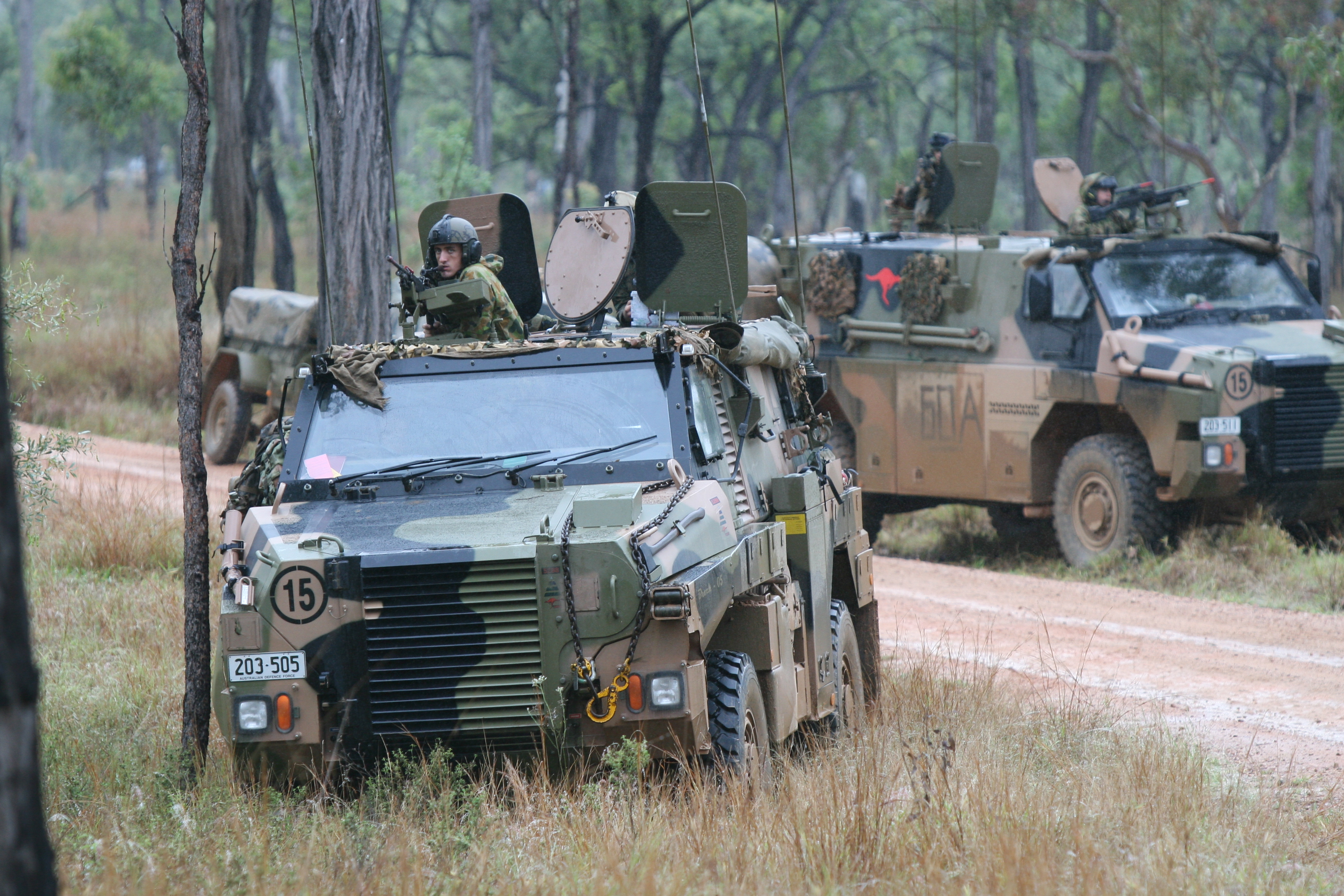
Two Bushmasters operated by the 2nd Battalion, Royal Australian Regiment during an exercise in 2010

This article describes the current structure of the Australian Army. It includes the army's order of battle and the headquarters locations of major units. Members of the Australian Army also serve within joint units of the Australian Defence Force which fall outside the direct command of the Australian Army.

== Overview ==
The Australian Army is organised into three main elements which report to the Chief of Army, the Headquarters of the 1st Division, Special Operations Command and Forces Command. Headquarters 1st Division is responsible for high-level training activities and is capable of being deployed to command large scale ground operations. It does not have any combat units permanently assigned to it, though it commands units during training activities and the Land Combat Readiness Centre reports to the divisional headquarters.

== Organisation ==
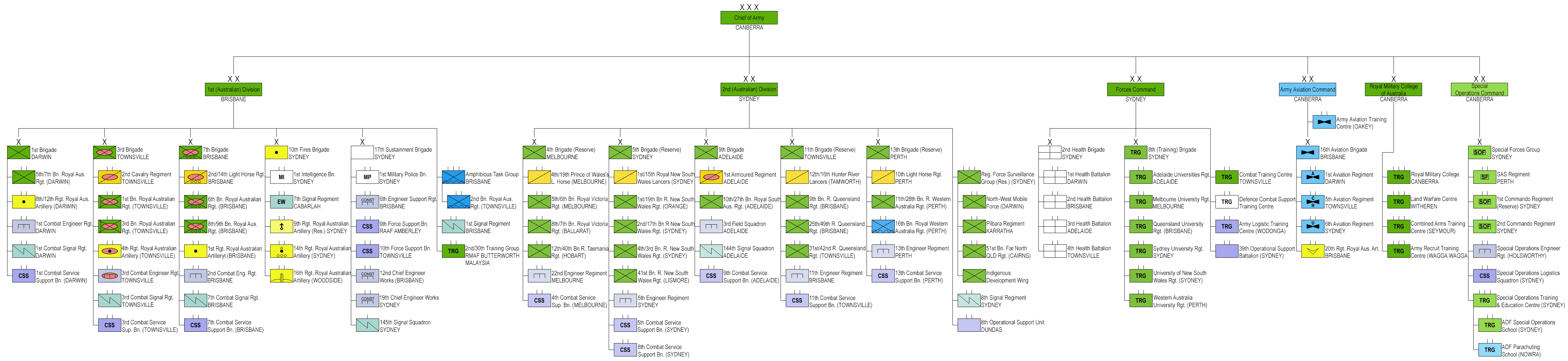
Australian Army organisation 2026

The following order of battle describes the Army's organisational structure at the battalion and independent company/squadron level. It does not take into account changes to units' structure and command arrangements associated with operational deployments.

=== Chief of Army ===
- 1st Division
- 2nd Division
- Forces Command
- Special Operations Command
- Army Aviation Command

=== 1st (Australian) Division ===
- 1st (Australian) Division
  - Headquarters, 1st Division (Gallipoli Barracks)
  - Amphibious Task Group (Brisbane)
    - 2nd Battalion, Royal Australian Regiment (Amphibious infantry) (Lavarack Barracks)
  - 1st Signal Regiment (Enoggera)
  - 2/30th Training Group (RMAF Butterworth, Malaysia)
  - 1st Intelligence Battalion (Victoria Barracks, NSW) — Will move to 10th Brigade
  - 7th Signal Regiment (Electronic Warfare) (Borneo Barracks, Qld) — Will move to 10th Brigade

==== 1st Brigade ====
- 1st Brigade
  - Headquarters, 1st Brigade (Robertson Barracks, Northern Territory)
  - 5th/7th Battalion, Royal Australian Regiment (Littoral infantry with Bushmaster Protected Mobility Vehicles and Hawkei vehicles) (Robertson Barracks, NT)
  - 8th/12th Regiment, Royal Australian Artillery (M777A2 towed howitzers) (Robertson Barracks, NT)
  - 1st Combat Engineer Regiment (Robertson Barracks, NT)
  - 1st Combat Signal Regiment (Robertson Barracks, NT)
  - 1st Combat Service Support Battalion (Robertson Barracks, NT)

==== 3rd Brigade ====
- 3rd Brigade
  - Headquarters, 3rd Brigade (Lavarack Barracks, Queensland)
  - 2nd Cavalry Regiment (Armoured cavalry regiment with ASLAV combat reconnaissance vehicles and M1A2 SEPv3 Abrams main battle tanks) (Lavarack Barracks, Qld)
  - 1st Battalion, Royal Australian Regiment (Mechanized infantry) (Lavarack Barracks, Qld)
  - 3rd Battalion, Royal Australian Regiment (Mechanized infantry) (Lavarack Barracks, Qld)
  - 4th Regiment, Royal Australian Artillery (Lavarack Barracks, Qld)
  - 3rd Combat Engineer Regiment (M1150 Assault Breacher Vehicles and M1074 Joint Assault Bridges) (Lavarack Barracks, Qld)
  - 3rd Combat Signal Regiment (Lavarack Barracks, Qld)
  - 3rd Combat Service Support Battalion (Lavarack Barracks, Qld)

==== 7th Brigade ====
- 7th Brigade
  - Headquarters, 7th Brigade (Gallipoli Barracks, Qld)
  - 2nd/14th Light Horse Regiment (Queensland Mounted Infantry) (Boxer combat reconnaissance vehicles) (Gallipoli Barracks, Qld)
  - 6th Battalion, Royal Australian Regiment (Motorised infantry with Bushmaster Protected Mobility Vehicles and Hawkei vehicles) (Gallipoli Barracks, Qld)
  - 8th/9th Battalion, Royal Australian Regiment (Motorised infantry with Bushmaster Protected Mobility Vehicle and Hawkei vehicles) (Gallipoli Barracks, Qld)
  - 1st Regiment, Royal Australian Artillery (M777A2 towed howitzers) (Gallipoli Barracks, Qld)
  - 2nd Combat Engineer Regiment (Gallipoli Barracks, Qld)
  - 7th Combat Signal Regiment (Gallipoli Barracks, Qld)
  - 7th Combat Service Support Battalion (Gallipoli Barracks, Qld)

==== 10th Brigade ====
- 10th Brigade
  - Headquarters, 10th Brigade
  - 9th Regiment, Royal Australian Artillery, (M252A1 mortars) (HQ at Kogarah Barracks, NSW)
    - 2nd/10th Light Battery (HQ in Melbourne, Vic)
    - 5th/11th Light Battery (HQ at Lavarack Barracks, Qld)
    - 6th/13th Light Battery (HQ at Keswick Barracks, SA)
    - 7th Light Battery (HQ in Dee Why, NSW)
    - 23rd Light Battery (HQ at Kogarah Barracks, NSW)
  - 14th Regiment, Royal Australian Artillery (M142 HIMARS multiple rocket launchers) (located in Adelaide)
    - 54th Siege Battery (HQ at RAAF Base Edinburgh)
  - 16th Regiment, Royal Australian Artillery (NASAMS-3 air defence systems) (Woodside Barracks, SA)
    - 110th Air Land Battery
    - 111th Air Land Battery
    - 1st Air Ground Operations Battery
    - Combat Services Support Battery

==== 17th Sustainment Brigade ====
- 17th Sustainment Brigade
  - Headquarters, 17th Sustainment Brigade (Randwick Barracks, NSW)
  - 1st Military Police Battalion (HQ at Victoria Barracks, NSW)
  - 145 Signals Squadron (Holsworthy Barracks, NSW)
  - 6th Engineer Support Regiment (Gallipoli Barracks, Qld)
  - 19th Chief Engineer Works (Randwick Barracks, NSW)
  - 12th Chief Engineer Works (Gallipoli Barracks, Qld)
  - 9th Force Support Battalion (HQ at RAAF Base Amberley, Queensland)
  - 10th Force Support Battalion (HQ at Ross Island Barracks, Queensland)
  - Littoral Manoeuvre Group
    - Headquarters, Littoral Manoeuvre Group (Gallipoli Barracks, Qld)
    - 1st Landing Craft Battalion

=== 2nd (Australian) Division ===
- 2nd (Australian) Division
  - Headquarters, 2nd Division (Randwick Barracks, NSW)
  - 8th Signal Regiment (HQ at Randwick Barracks, NSW)
    - 108th Signal Squadron (HQ at Simpson Barracks, Victoria) - 4th Brigade
    - 109th Signal Squadron (HQ at Irwin Barracks, WA) - 13th Brigade
    - 141st Signal Squadron (HQ at Lavarack Barracks, Qld) - 11th Brigade
    - 142nd Signal Squadron (HQ at Holsworthy Barracks, NSW) – 5th Brigade
    - 143rd Signal Squadron (HQ at HMAS Harman Canberra) – 2nd Division + 5th Brigade
    - 144th Signal Squadron (HQ at Keswick Barracks, SA) - 9th Brigade
    - Operational Support Squadron (HQ at Randwick Barracks, NSW) - 2nd Division Sydney
  - 8th Operational Support Unit

==== 4th Brigade ====
- 4th Brigade
  - Headquarters, 4th Brigade (Simpson Barracks, Victoria)
  - 4th/19th Prince of Wales' Light Horse (HQ at Simpson Barracks, Victoria)
  - 5th/6th Battalion, Royal Victoria Regiment (HQ at Hawthorn, Victoria)
  - 8th/7th Battalion, Royal Victoria Regiment (HQ at Ballarat, Victoria)
  - 12th/40th Battalion, Royal Tasmania Regiment (HQ at Anglesea Barracks, Tasmania)
  - 22nd Engineer Regiment, Royal Australian Engineers (HQ at Ringwood East, Victoria)
  - 4th Combat Service Support Battalion (HQ at Broadmeadows, Victoria)

==== 5th Brigade ====
- 5th Brigade
  - Headquarters, 5th Brigade (Holsworthy Barracks, NSW)
  - 1st/15th Royal New South Wales Lancers (Lancer Barracks, NSW)
  - 1st/19th Battalion, Royal New South Wales Regiment (HQ at Orange, New South Wales)
  - 2nd/17th Battalion, Royal New South Wales Regiment (HQ at Pymble, New South Wales)
  - 4th/3rd Battalion, Royal New South Wales Regiment (HQ at Sutherland, New South Wales)
  - 41st Battalion, Royal New South Wales Regiment (HQ at Lismore, New South Wales)
  - 5th Engineer Regiment (HQ at Holsworthy Barracks, NSW)
  - 5th Combat Service Support Battalion (HQ at (Holsworthy Barracks, NSW)

==== 9th Brigade ====
- 9th Brigade
  - Headquarters, 9th Brigade (Keswick Barracks, SA)
  - 1st Armoured Regiment (Experimentation) (Horseshoe Lines, Edinburgh Defence Precinct, South Australia)
    - A Squadron – 3rd/9th Light Horse (South Australian Mounted Rifles) (Reserve)
  - 10th/27th Battalion, Royal South Australia Regiment (HQ at Keswick Barracks, SA)
  - 3rd Field Squadron (HQ at Warradale Barracks, SA)
  - 9th Combat Service Support Battalion (HQ at Warradale Barracks, SA)

==== 11th Brigade ====
- 11th Brigade
  - Headquarters, 11th Brigade (Lavarack Barracks, Qld)
  - 12th/16th Hunter River Lancers (Bushmaster PMV)(HQ at Tamworth, New South Wales)
  - 9th Battalion, Royal Queensland Regiment (HQ at Gallipoli Barracks, Qld)
  - 25th/49th Battalion, Royal Queensland Regiment (HQ at Gallipoli Barracks, Qld)
  - 31st/42nd Battalion, Royal Queensland Regiment (HQ at Lavarack Barracks, Qld)
  - 11th Engineer Regiment (HQ at Gallipoli Barracks, Qld)
  - 11th Combat Service Support Battalion (HQ at Lavarack Barracks, Qld)

==== 13th Brigade ====
- 13th Brigade (Irwin Barracks, Western Australia)
  - Headquarters, 13th Brigade
  - 10th Light Horse Regiment (HQ at Irwin Barracks, WA)
  - 11th/28th Battalion, Royal Western Australia Regiment (HQ at Irwin Barracks, WA)
  - 16th Battalion, Royal Western Australia Regiment (amphibious infantry) (HQ at Irwin Barracks, WA)
  - 13th Engineer Regiment (HQ at Irwin Barracks, WA)
  - 13th Combat Service Support Battalion (HQ at Irwin Barracks, WA)

==== Regional Force Surveillance Group ====
- Regional Force Surveillance Group
  - 51st Battalion, Far North Queensland Regiment (HQ at Cairns, Queensland)
  - North-West Mobile Force (HQ at Larrakeyah Barracks, NT)
  - Pilbara Regiment (HQ at Taylor Barracks, WA)
  - Indigenous Development Wing

=== Forces Command ===
- Forces Command
  - Headquarters, Forces Command (Victoria Barracks, NSW)
  - Army Logistic Training Centre
  - Defence Combat Support Training Centre
  - 39th Operational Support Battalion (Sydney)
  - Combat Training Centre (Lavarack Barracks)

==== 2nd Health Brigade ====
- 2nd Health Brigade
  - Headquarters, 2nd Health Brigade (Victoria Barracks, NSW)
  - 1st Health Battalion (Robertson Barracks, NT)
  - 2nd Health Battalion (Gallipoli Barracks, Qld)
  - 3rd Health Battalion (Keswick Barracks, SA)
  - 4th Health Battalion (Lavarack Barracks, Qld)

==== 8th Brigade ====
- 8th (Training) Brigade
  - Headquarters, 8th Brigade (Timor Barracks, NSW)
  - Adelaide Universities Regiment (HQ at Hampstead Barracks, SA)
  - Melbourne University Regiment (HQ at Carlton, Victoria)
  - Queensland University Regiment (HQ at St Lucia, Qld)
  - Sydney University Regiment (HQ at Darlington, New South Wales)
  - University of New South Wales Regiment (HQ at Kensington, New South Wales)
  - Western Australia University Regiment (HQ at Leeuwin Barracks, WA)

=== Special Operations Command ===
- Special Operations Command
  - Special Operations Command Headquarters (Headquarters Joint Operations Command, NSW)
  - Special Forces Group
    - Special Air Service Regiment (Campbell Barracks, WA)
    - 1st Commando Regiment (HQ at Randwick Barracks, NSW)
    - 2nd Commando Regiment (Holsworthy Barracks, NSW)
    - Special Operations Engineer Regiment (Holsworthy Barracks, NSW)
    - Special Operations Logistics Squadron (Banksmeadow, NSW)
    - Defence Special Operations Training and Education Centre (Holsworthy, NSW)
      - Australian Defence Force School of Special Operations (Holsworthy, NSW)
      - Australian Defence Force Parachuting School (HMAS Albatross, NSW)

=== Army Aviation Command ===
- Army Aviation Command
  - Headquarters, Army Aviation Command (Canberra)
  - Army Aviation Training Centre, (Oakey, Qld)
  - 16th Aviation Brigade
    - Headquarters, 16th Aviation Brigade (Gallipoli Barracks, Qld)
    - 1st Aviation Regiment (Boeing AH-64E Apache Guardian), (RAAF Base Townsville, Queensland)
    - 5th Aviation Regiment (Boeing CH-47F Chinook helicopters and Sikorsky UH-60M Black Hawk helicopters) (RAAF Base Townsville, Qld)
    - 6th Aviation Regiment (Sikorsky UH-60M Black Hawk helicopters) (Holsworthy Barracks, NSW)
    - 20th Regiment, Royal Australian Artillery (RQ-21 Blackjack unmanned aerial vehicles) (Gallipoli Barracks, Qld)
    - 16th Aviation Support Battalion

=== Land Combat College ===
- Royal Military College of Australia (Duntroon Garrison, ACT)
  - Royal Military College, Duntroon (Duntroon Garrison, ACT)
  - Army Recruit Training Centre (Blamey Barracks, NSW)
  - Land Warfare Centre (HQ at Kokoda Barracks, Qld)
  - Combined Arms Training Centre
    - B Squadron, 3rd/4th Cavalry Regiment

== Geographic distribution ==
Australian Army division and brigade headquarters 2020
(Army Reserve headquarters in Italic)

== Corps and Regiments ==
Corps in the Australian Army, are administrative groupings of soldiers with a common function to promote pride and esprit de corps.

== See also ==
- List of Australian Army Corps
- List of Australian Army regiments
- List of Australian military bases
