= Special forces of Australia =

Units of Australian Defence Force

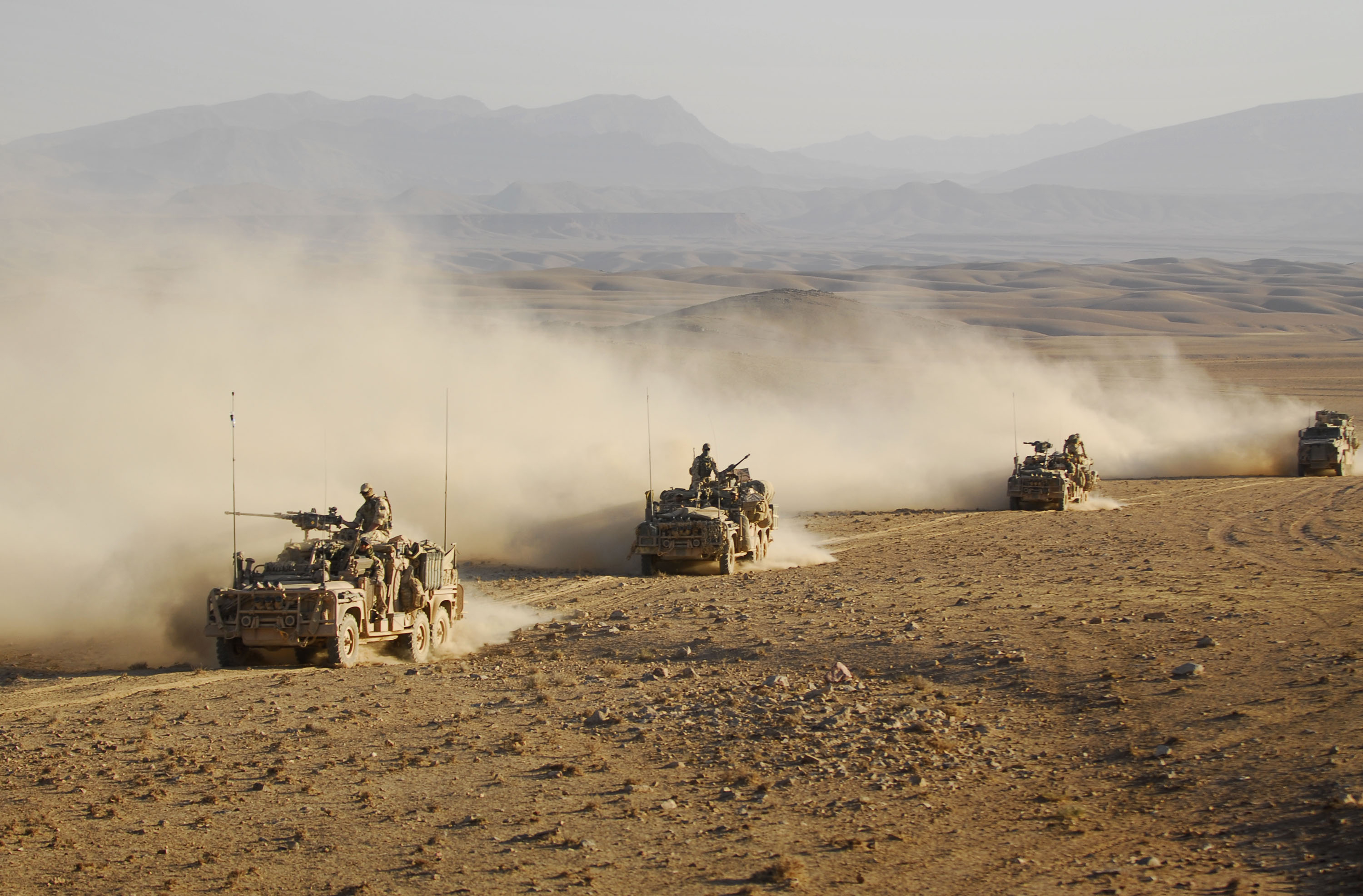
An Australian Special Operations Task Group patrol in Afghanistan during October 2009

The special forces of the Australian Defence Force are units of Special Operations Command and associated units of the Royal Australian Navy and the Royal Australian Air Force that conduct and or support special operations to advance and protect the national security of the Commonwealth of Australia. The special forces of Australia have a lineage to a variety of units raised in the Second World War such as the Independent and Commando Companies, Z Special Unit, Navy Beach Commandos, and the Coastwatchers. Australian special forces have most recently been deployed to Iraq in Operation Okra as the Special Operations Task Group, as the Special Operations Task Group in Afghanistan, in Afghanistan in support of the Australian Secret Intelligence Service and regularly for counter-terrorism pre-deploy to locations of major domestic events throughout Australia in readiness to support law enforcement such as the 2014 G20 Brisbane summit.

== History ==
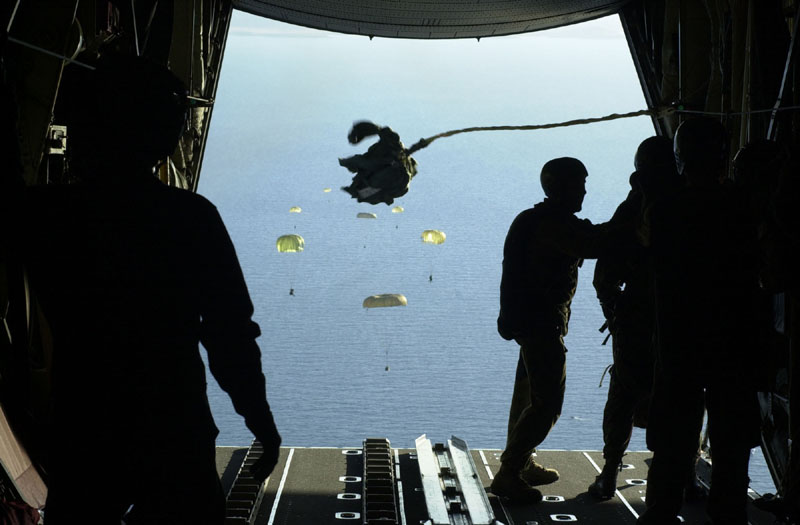
Soldiers from the 1st Commando Company parachute with their inflatable boats from an RAAF C-130H into Shoalwater Bay

The special forces of Australia trace their lineage to the commando units such as the Independent and Commando Companies and reconnaissance and intelligence gathering units such as Z Special Unit part of Special Operations Australia (code name Services Reconnaissance Department SRD) and M Special Unit part of the Allied Intelligence Bureau (AIB) raised during World War II. The 1st and 2nd Commando Regiments raised post-war are descendants of the commando companies. (Note: The 2nd Command Regiment was previously called the 4th Battalion, Royal Australian Regiment (Commando). 1st Commando Regiment is an Army Reserve regiment.)

== Command and control ==
The ultimate authority for the deployment of Australian special forces rests with the National Security Committee through consultation with the Chief of the Defence Force, the Secretary of Defence, and the Australian Intelligence Community. The Special Operations Command is the command responsible for Army special forces, including the Special Air Service Regiment, 1st Commando Regiment and 2nd Commando Regiment. The Chief of Joint Operations and joint task force commanders are responsible for the operational functions of Special Operations Command whilst the Chief of Army is responsible for "raise, train, sustain" functions. The Special Operations Commander Australia reports directly to the Chief of the Defence Force for domestic counter terrorism incidents. The Australian Army definition of special operations is "highly specialised and focused operations performed by specially selected, trained and prepared individuals and teams imbued with a creative mindset capable of producing solutions beyond conventional approaches" and that "these activities are designed to achieve tailored operational, military and national strategic effects beyond those of conventional forces."

== Functions and units ==
All the Australian Army special forces units have been grouped together under the Special Operations Command (SOCOMD) since December 2002. Clearance divers are under the command of the Navy unless seconded to SOCOMD or joint task forces of the Joint Operations Command and the Air Combat Controllers are under the command of the Air Force unless operational when they are attached to SOCOMD units or joint task forces of the Joint Operations Command.

=== Counter-terrorism and special recovery ===
A chief role of Australian special forces is conducting and supporting counter-terrorism operations and hostage rescue overseas and when called out within Australia in support state and territory police. Dedicated sub-units are established designated as a Tactical Assault Group to respond to counter-terrorist incidents. Tactical Assault Group (West) is formed by the Special Air Service Regiment and Tactical Assault Group (East) is formed by the 2nd Commando Regiment and the Clearance Diving Branch. The Tactical Assault Groups regularly conduct familiarisation exercises in capital cities, participate in National Anti Terrorism Exercises and pre-deploy to major domestic event locations in readiness to assume control from law enforcement if requested.

=== Maritime operations ===
The water operations troops in the Special Air Service Regiment are military divers trained as assault swimmers dedicated to maritime special operations and all commandos in the 1st and 2nd Commando Regiments receive amphibious operators training with Zodiac inflatable boats including parachute water insertion. The Clearance Diving Branch is the military diving unit of the Royal Australian Navy that is trained in all manner of military diving (not a dedicated special operations focus) including reconnaissance and shipping raids and sabotage.

=== Support to special operations ===
The Special Operations Engineer Regiment (SOER) (previously called the Incident Response Regiment) provides Special Operations Command with CBRNE response capabilities, combat engineering, mobility and survivability, and ordnance disposal both domestically and on operations overseas.

The Special Operations Logistics Squadron (SOLS) provides Special Operations Command with diverse logistic support both domestically and on operations overseas.

=== Aviation support ===
The 171st Special Operations Aviation Squadron of the Australian Army's 6th Aviation Regiment provides domestic and overseas rotary wing airlift and air mobility for the Special Operations Command including for Tactical Assault Groups. Aviation support to special operations can be traced back to the Royal Australian Air Force's No. 200 Flight during the Second World War.

=== Air combat control ===
The Royal Australian Air Force's No. 4 Squadron B Flight Combat Control Team (CCT) provide air traffic control and forward air control for close air support in support of special operations.

=== Special forces training ===
The Australian Defence Force School of Special Operations, formerly the Special Forces Training Centre, based in Singleton, NSW was established on 1 December 1998 to conduct selection courses for the Special Air Service Regiment, 1st Commando Regiment and 2nd Commando Regiment. The ADF Parachuting School is responsible for providing individual parachute training primarily to Special Operations Command.

=== Women in the Special forces ===
On 1 January 2014, the ADF removed the restriction on currently serving women applying for special forces combat roles and on 1 January 2016 direct entry to combat roles was opened to women. Prior to the change women had served in special forces in non-combat roles. Women have passed the selection course for the Army Reserve 1st Commando Regiment and been awarded a Green Beret. In 1981, Army Reserve signaller Kerri Hiam of 126th Signal Squadron became the first woman to attempt selection, pass selection and be awarded a Green Beret. In 1997, three Army women officers, including intelligence officer Lieutenant Fleur Froggatt, became the first women to complete the 1st Commando Regiment officer selection course with one of the officers awarded a Green Beret. The women were barred from serving in combat roles. A 2012 federal government report stated that female medics had been serving in Afghanistan on patrols with special forces units (the Special Operations Task Group) providing health clinics for local women and girls.

== Former units ==
=== Covert Action Directorate ===
In 1983, the Australian Secret Intelligence Service (ASIS), Australia's civilian national foreign intelligence agency, established a special forces unit, named the Covert Action Directorate, to develop a special recovery capability. The SASR had recently developed a domestic counter terrorism capability establishing the Tactical Assault Group. The Directorate covertly recruited civilians, who were required to maintain a 'cover', to receive part-time training, including from the ADF and the Australian Security Intelligence Organisation (ASIO), to conduct overseas counter terrorism operations. The Directorate consisted of members with either an active role or a support role and included a female operative Alexandra Smith a former Royal Australian Air Force intelligence officer. Part-time training was estimated to take two to three years to complete. Training began in March and continued through to November culminating in a three-week exercise held in Sydney and Melbourne. On 30 November 1983, the Directorate held a bungled hostage rescue training exercise at the Sheraton Hotel in Melbourne without proper approvals, including the carriage of firearms, culminating in the public exposure of the unit. The ASIS covert military function approval was subsequently revoked in June 1985, ASIS subject to a Royal Commission investigation and the special recovery role assigned to the SASR.

== See also ==
- List of special forces units
- List of military diving units (including special forces)
- United States special operations forces
- UK Special Forces
- Canadian Special Operations Forces Command
- Special Operations Command (New Zealand)

== Notes ==
Footnotes

Citations
