= Shah Wali Kot Offensive =

2010 military offensive during the War in Afghanistan

Coordinates: 31°57′1″N 65°55′0″E

- Part of the War in Afghanistan (2001–2021)
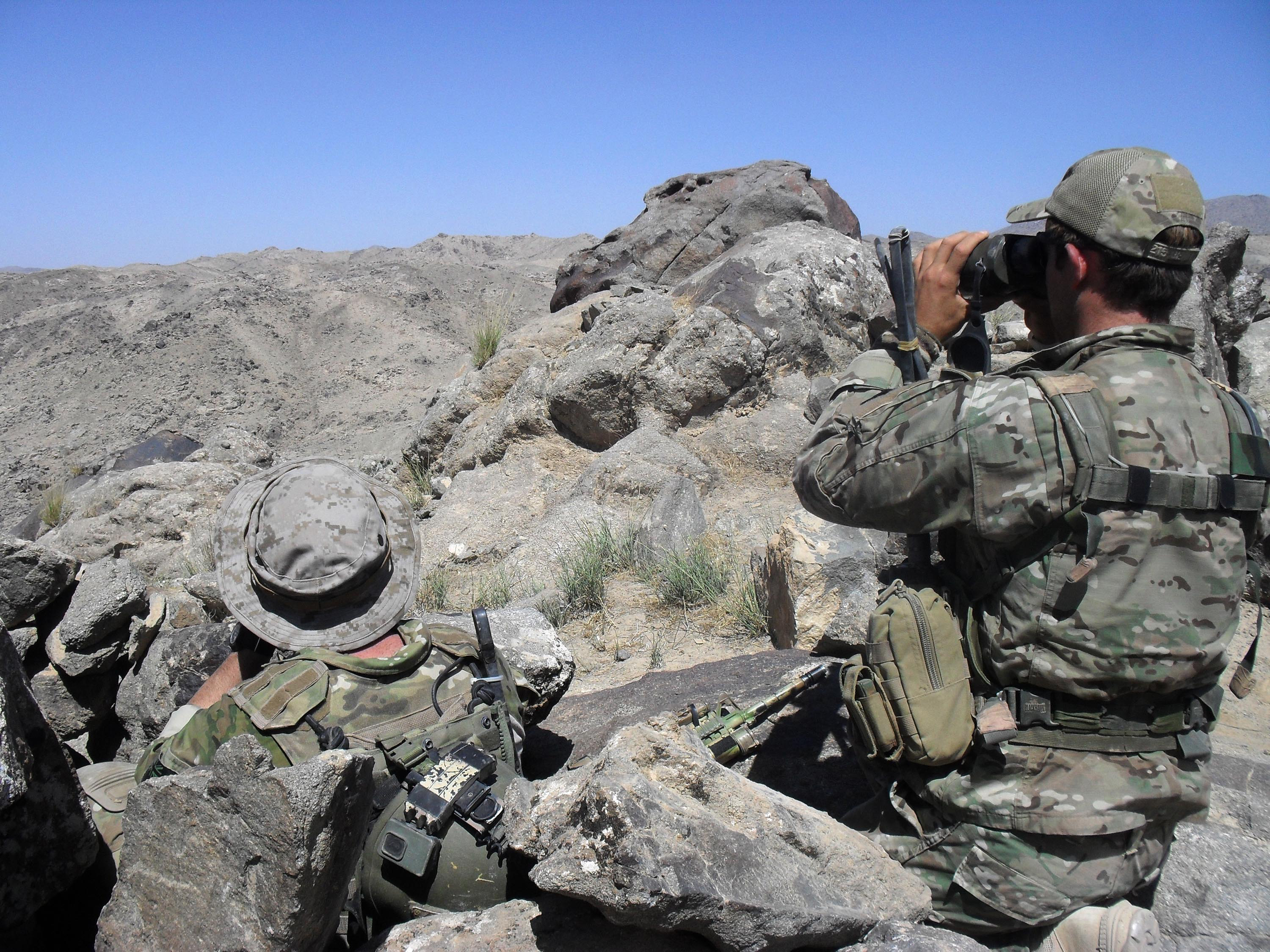
- Two Australian soldiers during the Shah Wali Kot Offensive
Date	10–14 June 2010
Location	Shah Wali Kot District, Kandahar Province, Afghanistan
Result	Coalition victory

Belligerents
Islamic Republic of Afghanistan; Australia; United States	(Afghanistan) Taliban

Strength
	~100+ insurgents

Casualties and losses
2 wounded	Around 100 believed killed

The Shah Wali Kot Offensive was a five-day joint operation during the War in Afghanistan, conducted by Australian special forces and the Afghan National Army with US air support, between 10 and 14 June 2010. The operation took place in the Shah Wali Kot District of Kandahar Province, occurring in preparation for the coalition clearance of the province and resulting in heavy insurgent casualties.

== Background ==
In June 2010 the International Security Assistance Force (ISAF) began Operation Hamkari as part of an attempt to increase security around the southern city of Kandahar, in Afghanistan. As part of the operation Australian forces were tasked with conducting a series of disruption operations in the Shah Wali Kot district of northern Kandahar province. A five-day air mobile operation subsequently began in the second week of June, targeting an insurgent stronghold which had been controlled by the Taliban since 1995. Forces involved included the Australian Special Operations Task Group and Afghan National Army units, supported by United States Army helicopters From 1st Battalion, 101st Aviation Regiment, known as Task Force No Mercy.

== Battle ==
Alpha Company Group from 2nd Commando Regiment made the initial attack on 10 June, and was later reinforced by a troop from the 2nd Squadron, Special Air Service Regiment (SASR) when it was discovered that the insurgents were preparing a counter-attack. Fighting was particularly intense on the second day of the operation when Australian and Afghan soldiers were fired upon by insurgents shortly after they disembarked from their helicopters during an assault into Tizak, with the engagement lasting for 13 hours. After five days of fighting the surviving insurgents withdrew from the area.

Following the operation the ISAF stated that an insurgent force numbering over 100 strong had been defeated. The commander of Australian forces in the Middle East, Major General John Cantwell claimed that the operation had "dealt a major blow to the insurgent forces and their commanders and made a major and direct contribution to ISAF security operations focused on Kandahar province and its nearby districts" and would also improve security in Oruzgan province. The Australian troops also captured large numbers of weapons during the operation.

== Aftermath ==
The Australian Department of Defence claimed that the operation resulted in the deaths of "'a significant number of insurgents" but did not provide a figure for the number killed. One Australian soldier and an Afghan soldier were wounded by gunfire during the operation and several helicopters were damaged. An Afghan civilian also approached the coalition troops seeking medical assistance for a wound in his hand, but the Australian Department of Defence stated that it was not clear how he had received this injury. The ISAF stated that no civilians were injured in the operation. As many as 100 insurgents were believed to have been killed.

Later, during further operations in the area on 21 June, three Australian commandos were killed when the US Army UH-60 Blackhawk helicopter they were travelling in crashed in northern Kandahar Province. One of the crew of the helicopter also died, while another seven Australians and a US crewman were seriously injured.

On 23 January 2011, Corporal Ben Roberts-Smith was awarded the Victoria Cross for Australia at Campbell Barracks in Perth, for his actions on 11 June 2010. Roberts-Smith's patrol commander, identified only as Sergeant P, was awarded the Star of Gallantry for his role in the engagement. In total 13 individual awards for bravery were made, while the Special Air Service Regiment and 2nd Commando Regiment were awarded the battle honour "Eastern Shah Wali Kot" for their actions.
