= Jeff Sengelman =

Australian army officer

- Military career
- Allegiance: Australia
- Branch: Australian Army
- Service years: 1980–2017
- Rank: Major General
- Commands: Special Operations Commander Australia (2014–17); Deputy Chief of Army (2011–12); Forces Command (2011); 6th Brigade (2010–11); 4th Battalion, Royal Australian Regiment (Commando) (2000–01)
- Conflicts: East Timor (UNTAET); Iraq War
- Awards: Distinguished Service Cross; Member of the Order of Australia; Conspicuous Service Cross; Officer of the Legion of Merit (United States)

Major General Jeffery John Sengelman, DSC, AM, CSC is a retired senior officer of the Australian Army. He joined the army via the Officer Cadet School, Portsea in 1980, was commissioned into the Royal Australian Infantry Corps and spent much of his military career in special forces. He commanded the 4th Battalion, Royal Australian Regiment (Commando) (2000–01) and the 6th Brigade (2010–11), deployed on operations to East Timor and Iraq, and served as Commander Forces Command in 2011, Deputy Chief of Army from 2011 to 2012, Head of Modernisation and Strategic Planning – Army from 2012 to 2014, and Special Operations Commander Australia from 2014 until his retirement in 2017.

== Military career ==
Sengelman entered the Officer Cadet School, Portsea, in 1980 and, on graduation, was commissioned a second lieutenant in the Royal Australian Infantry Corps on 13 June 1981. He occupied a series of regimental, staff and training appointments in infantry and special forces units during his early career, including as a Freefall and Counter Terrorist Troop Commander and unit adjutant in the Special Air Service Regiment (SASR). He was promoted to lieutenant on 13 December 1982, made an acting captain on 1 July 1984, and advanced to substantive captain from 1 February 1986.

As a major, Sengelman was Officer Commanding 2nd Sabre Squadron, SASR during the early 1990s. For his performance in the role, he was awarded the Conspicuous Service Cross in the 1995 Birthday Honours. Sengelman assumed command of the 4th Battalion, Royal Australian Regiment (Commando) (4RAR) in January 2000. 4RAR had not long come through a complete restructure to transition from a light infantry battalion to a commando special forces unit in order to supplement the capability of the SASR. Three months into Sengelman's command, however, 4RAR was tasked to deploy with the United Nations Transitional Administration in East Timor and had to be rapidly reorganised as light infantry to meet its operational requirements. Sengelman led 4RAR in East Timor from April to October 2000, working with the East Timorese to ensure local security, gather intelligence and conduct regular patrols. Sengelman relinquished command of 4RAR in Sydney in December 2001, but in recognition of his "distinguished command and leadership" on operations in East Timor he was awarded the Distinguished Service Cross in the 2002 Birthday Honours.

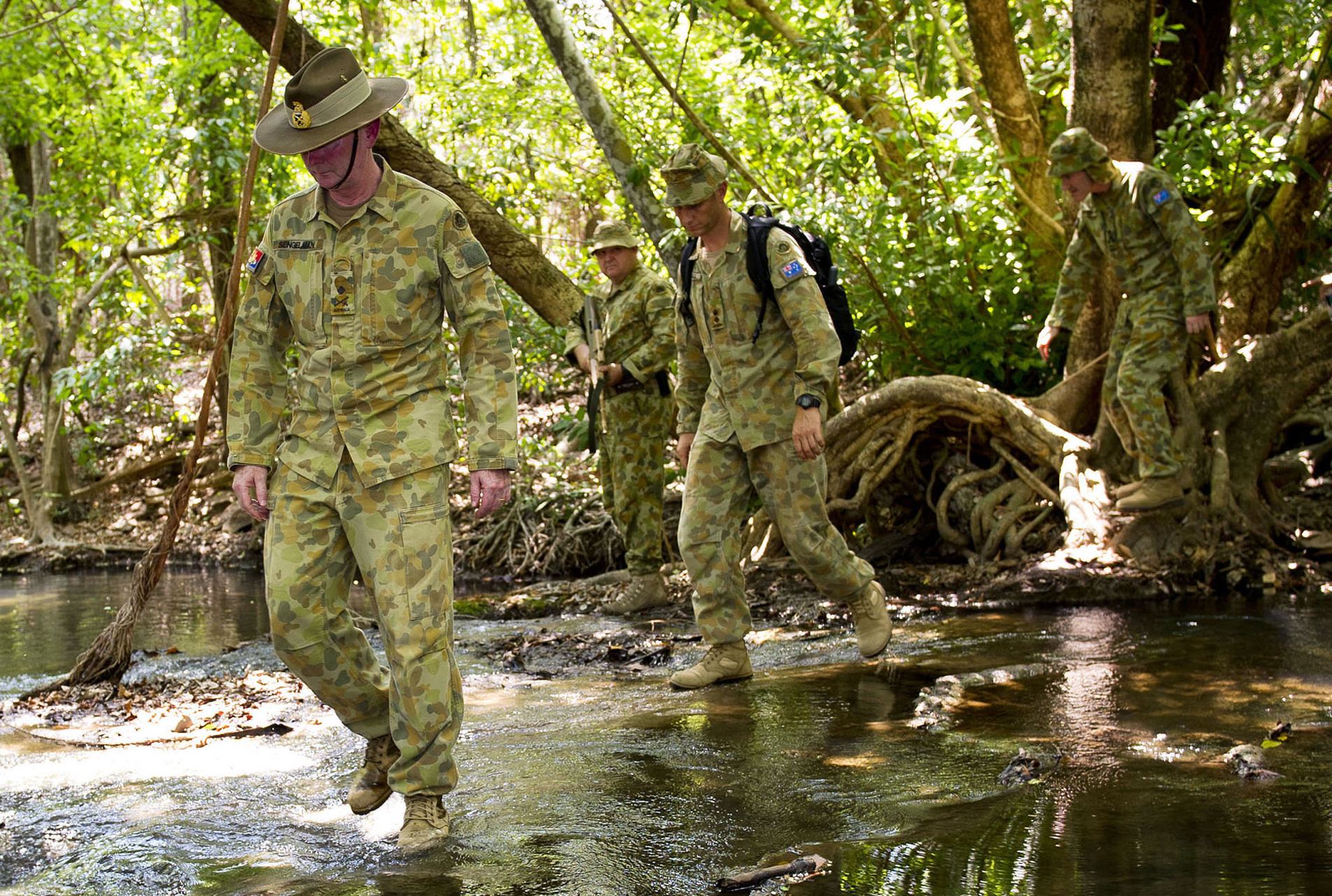
Sengelman (at left) crosses a creek in the Northern Territory during exercise Kowari in October 2014.

Sengelman was subsequently appointed Staff Officer (Policy) to the Chief of the Defence Force, was Director of Military Art at the Royal Military College, Duntroon from 2003 to 2005, and served in the Iraq War. As a brigadier, he was Deputy Special Operations Commander Australia, chief of staff to Special Operations Command, and commanded the re-raised 6th Brigade from 2010. For his "exceptional service" in these roles, he was appointed a Member of the Order of Australia in the 2011 Birthday Honours. Promoted to major general, Sengelman was made Commander Forces Command in June 2011, reposted as Deputy Chief of Army in October, and appointed as Head of Modernisation and Strategic Planning – Army in February 2012. In December 2014, Sengelman assumed his final military posting as Special Operations Commander Australia (SOCAUST). As SOCAUST, he was responsible to both the Chief of Army and Chief of Joint Operations for the training, capability development, and operations of Australia's special forces. Sengelman was succeeded as SOCAUST by Major General Adam Findlay in June 2017, and retired from the army after a career of 37 years.

Sengelman holds a Bachelor of Arts, a Master of Arts in International Relations and a Master of Arts in Strategic Studies. He is a graduate of the Australian Command and Staff College and the United States Army War College.

== Personal life and later career ==
Following his retirement from the army, Sengelman joined the board of the communications company EM Solutions in October 2017. He currently serves as Chairman of the Board for a publicly traded, multinational communications technology company, and a human performance optimisation company. Sengelman also mentors veterans with PTSD in his local community and serves as a Board Director of the Australian Capital Territory, Domestic Violence Crisis Service.

Sengelman is married to Julie, with whom he has a son and a daughter. He enjoys reading, Rugby Union, hiking and surfing.

== Bibliography ==
- Davies, Andrew; Jennings, Peter; Scheer, Benjamin (2014). A Versatile Force: The Future of Australia's Special Operations Capability (PDF). Barton, Australian Capital Territory: Australian Strategic Policy Institute. ISBN 9781921302978.
- Horner, David; Bou, Jean, eds. (2008). "Appendix C: Commanding Officers". Duty First: A History of the Royal Australian Regiment (2nd ed.). Sydney: Allen & Unwin. pp. 438–444. ISBN 9780044422273.
- Stockings, Craig (2008). "Upheaval, Uncertainty and Opportunity: UN Operations and Australia, 1990–1999". In Horner, David; Bou, Jean (eds.). Duty First: A History of the Royal Australian Regiment (2nd ed.). Sydney: Allen & Unwin. pp. 280–305. ISBN 9780044422273.

Military offices
Preceded by Brigadier Daniel McDaniel (Acting)	Special Operations Commander Australia; 2014–2017	Succeeded by Major General Adam Findlay
Preceded by Major General Paul Symon	Deputy Chief of Army; 2011–2012	Succeeded by Major General Angus Campbell
Preceded by Major General David Morrison	Commander Forces Command; 2011	Succeeded by Major General Michael Slater
