= Special Forces Group (Australia) =

Special operations formation of the Australian Army

- Active: December 2015 - present
- Country: Australia
- Branch: Australian Army
- Type: Headquarters
- Size: Brigade
- Part of: Special Operations Command

Special Forces Group (SFG) is an Australian Army formation command that forms part of the Special Operations Command (SOCOMD). The group is a brigade-level formation that commands all of the units assigned to Special Operations Command. The Special Forces Group reports to the Special Operations Command.

In October 2015, the Chief of Army's Senior Advisory Committee (CASAC) recommended as part of a review of SOCOMD that a formation command be established within SOCOMD responsible for the command and control of SOCOMD units. The Special Forces Group was subsequently established in December 2015.

Brigadier Craig Shortt was appointed Commander Special Forces Group (COMO SFG) in December 2018.

== Structure ==
As of 2020, the Special Forces Group comprised the following units:

- Headquarters, Special Forces Group
  - Special Air Service Regiment (Campbell Barracks, WA)
  - 1st Commando Regiment (HQ at Randwick Barracks, NSW)
  - 2nd Commando Regiment (Holsworthy Barracks, NSW)
  - Special Operations Engineer Regiment (Holsworthy Barracks, NSW)
  - Special Operations Logistics Squadron (Banksmeadow, NSW)
  - Defence Special Operations Training and Education Centre (Holsworthy, NSW)
    - Australian Defence Force School of Special Operations (Holsworthy, NSW)
    - Australian Defence Force Parachuting School (HMAS Albatross, NSW)

The Special Forces Group is supported by the 6th Aviation Regiment from the 16th Aviation Brigade. The 6th Aviation Regiment is under the operational command of SOCOMD for "directed special operations tasking".

== Bibliography ==
- Australian Army (November 2020). "Special Operations Command Information Booklet" (PDF). Australian Army.
- Chief of Army's Senior Advisory Committee (16 October 2015). SOCOMD Command Review and Restructure (PDF) (Report). Australian Army. Submission 05/15. Archived from the original (PDF) on 27 January 2022.
- Findlay, Special Operations Commander Australia MAJGEN Adam (1 September 2020). Report to CA: Transformation of Special Operations Command Since 2015 (PDF) (Report). Special Operations Command. BQ17309479.
- Irvine, David (31 August 2018). Review of Special Operations Command - Australian Army (PDF) (Report). Australian Army. Archived from the original (PDF) on 22 August 2022.
