= Operation Groper =

Operation Groper was an operation by Australian special forces immediately after World War II to discover the fate of missing Australian soldiers on Timor.
