= Operation Starfish (World War Two) =

Operation used by the Australians in WWII

Operation Starfish was an operation by Australian special forces in World War II on the island of Lombok.
