= Special Operations Logistics Squadron =

Specialised unit of the Australian Army

Special Operations Logistic Squadron
- Active: 2003 – present
- Country: Australia
- Branch: Australian Army
- Type: Military Logistics
- Role: Special operations support
- Size: Squadron (100 full-time personnel, 20 reservists)
- Part of: Special Forces Group
- Garrison/HQ: Holsworthy Barracks, Sydney
- Motto: "Assured Support"

Insignia
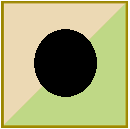
- Unit Colour Patch
- Abbreviation: SOLS

The Special Operations Logistic Squadron (SOLS) is an independent and specialised unit of the Australian Army based in Sydney which provides specialist logistical support to all units of the Special Operations Command in support of special operations. It has developed a "jack of all trades" capability across military logistics including rapid prototyping and metal fabrication.

== History ==
The Special Operations Logistics Squadron (SOLS) was originally established as the Special Operations Combat Service Support Company (SOCSSC) in July 2003, as part of the newly created Special Operations Command, to provide second and selected third line support to special forces units. The company was re-designated as the Special Operations Logistic Squadron in 2007.

== Role ==
The Special Operations Logistics Squadron is staffed by 100 full-time personnel and about 20 reservists and is the only unit responsible for providing logistical support to the Special Operations Command in all theatres of operations around the world. As such SOLS is the only independent logistic unit within the Australian Army and its personnel are trained by the Army Logistic Training Centre and come from the Royal Australian Electrical and Mechanical Engineers, Royal Australian Army Ordnance Corps, or Royal Australian Corps of Transport.

Whilst SOLS officers and logisticians are not special forces personnel, they are required to conduct their role in arduous conditions, remote locations, and in isolated and hostile settings. As such, SOLS officers and logisticians are expected to maintain a skill set wider than that normally expected of those found within the wider Australian Army. SOLS is also responsible for training its own personnel in specialist logistics support.

Alongside the Special Operations Engineer Regiment, the Special Operations Logistics Squadron provides support to the Special Air Service Regiment and the 2nd Commando Regiment of the Special Operations Command in counterterrorism operations with the Tactical Assault Groups and in operations overseas including most recently in Iraq and Afghanistan. The Special Operations Logistics Squadron has also deployed in humanitarian aid within the Asia-Pacific region.
