= Operation Acolyte =

- Operational scope: Security, ceremonial and general support
- Planned by: Australian Defence Force
- Objective: Provide security, ceremonial and general support to Commonwealth Games organisers and local authorities.
- Date: 2003-2006
- Executed by: Australian Army, Royal Australian Navy, Royal Australian Air Force

Operation Acolyte was the name given to the Australian Defence Force's (ADF) contribution to providing security, ceremonial and general support to the 2006 Commonwealth Games held in Melbourne, Australia. The ADF contributed approximately 2600 personnel to Operation Acolyte from across the three defence services (Army, Navy, Air Force), and was commanded by Brigadier Andrew Smith.

== Notable Deployments ==
As part of the operation, the Royal Australian Navy minesweeper HMAS Norman conducted patrols around the Yarra River, identifying underwater points of interest.

The Royal Australian Air Force was also deployed to provide airspace security. This included a detachment of FA/18 Hornets, a Boeing 707 air-to-air refuelling aircraft from No. 33 Squadron, and ground-based air surveillance from the No. 41 (Radio Direction Finding) Wing. The operation saw the first-ever use of the ZN/TPS-77 Tactical Air Defence Radar System by the ADF.

Furthermore, Tactical Assault Group members from the Australian Army's Special Operations Command were deployed to provide a specialist counter-terrorism and hostage-rescue capability if needed.
