= Lyn McDade =

- Born: Adelaide, South Australia
- Military career
- Allegiance: Australia
- Branch: Australian Army
- Rank: Brigadier
- Commands: Director of Military Prosecutions

Brigadier Lyn McDade is a former senior officer in the Australian Army, who held the position of Director of Military Prosecutions. In 2010 she was the centre of widespread media attention within Australia due to charges against three former members of the Special Operations Task Group deployed to Afghanistan. On 29 August 2025, the Director of Military Prosecutions, Brigadier Lyn McDade, had informed the Defence Minister that she was not able to present evidence concerning the allegations and the all charges against the individuals were withdrawn.

== Military career ==
Lyn McDade has spent 23 years in the Australian Regular Army and Australian Army Reserve. In 2006, while a Lieutenant Colonel, Lyn McDade she was appointed the Director of Military Prosecutions, the Australian Defence Force's highest ranking prosecutor. This office came with the rank of Brigadier and she was initially appointed to the office for a 5-year period.

On 27 September 2010, McDade announced that manslaughter charges were being brought against members of the 1st Commando Regiment for an incident that occurred in Afghanistan during a raid on 12 February 2009. The raid resulted in six deaths and four injuries and was subject to an investigation by the Australian Defence Force Investigative Service. Other charges brought against ADF personnel were; dangerous conduct, failing to comply with a lawful general order and prejudicial conduct. Due to the serious nature of the charges, the first of this magnitude for soldiers of this generation, the Australian media covered this story. The coverage of this story ranged from concerns about disunity within the Army to political commentary from the Prime Minister at the time Julia Gillard and Opposition Leader Tony Abbott.

== Public career ==
While an Army Reservist Lyn McDade worked for the Northern Territory government as a Civil and Police Prosecutor, Deputy Coroner and Relieving Magistrate. She has also practiced as a Barrister-at-Law.
