= Special Operations Command (Australia) =

Special operations command of the Australian Army

- Active: 2003–present
- Country: Australia
- Role: Special operations
- Size: 2,050 (active in 2014); 750 (reserve in 2014)
- Part of: Australian Defence Force
- Headquarters location: General John Baker Complex, Bungendore
- Mottos: Acies Acuta (The Cutting Edge)

Commanders
- Current commander: Major General Garth Gould

The Special Operations Command (SOCOMD) is an Australian Defence Force command that was established on 5 May 2003 to unite all of the Australian Army's special forces units and by 2008 was fully operational. Australia's Special Operations Command is of equivalent status to Australia's Fleet, Forces and Air Commands. It is modelled on the equivalent commands in the United States and British military forces, and is led by a major general as Special Operations Commander Australia (SOCAUST).

The origins of SOCOMD began in 1979 with the army creating a small Directorate Special Action Forces—Army. On 13 February 1990, Headquarters Special Forces was established, which was renamed in 1997 to Headquarters Special Operations and in 2003 to Special Operations Headquarters or SOCOMD.

Since February 2024, SOCOMD personnel have been categorised as either special forces operators, special forces integrators or special operations forces enablers.

== History ==
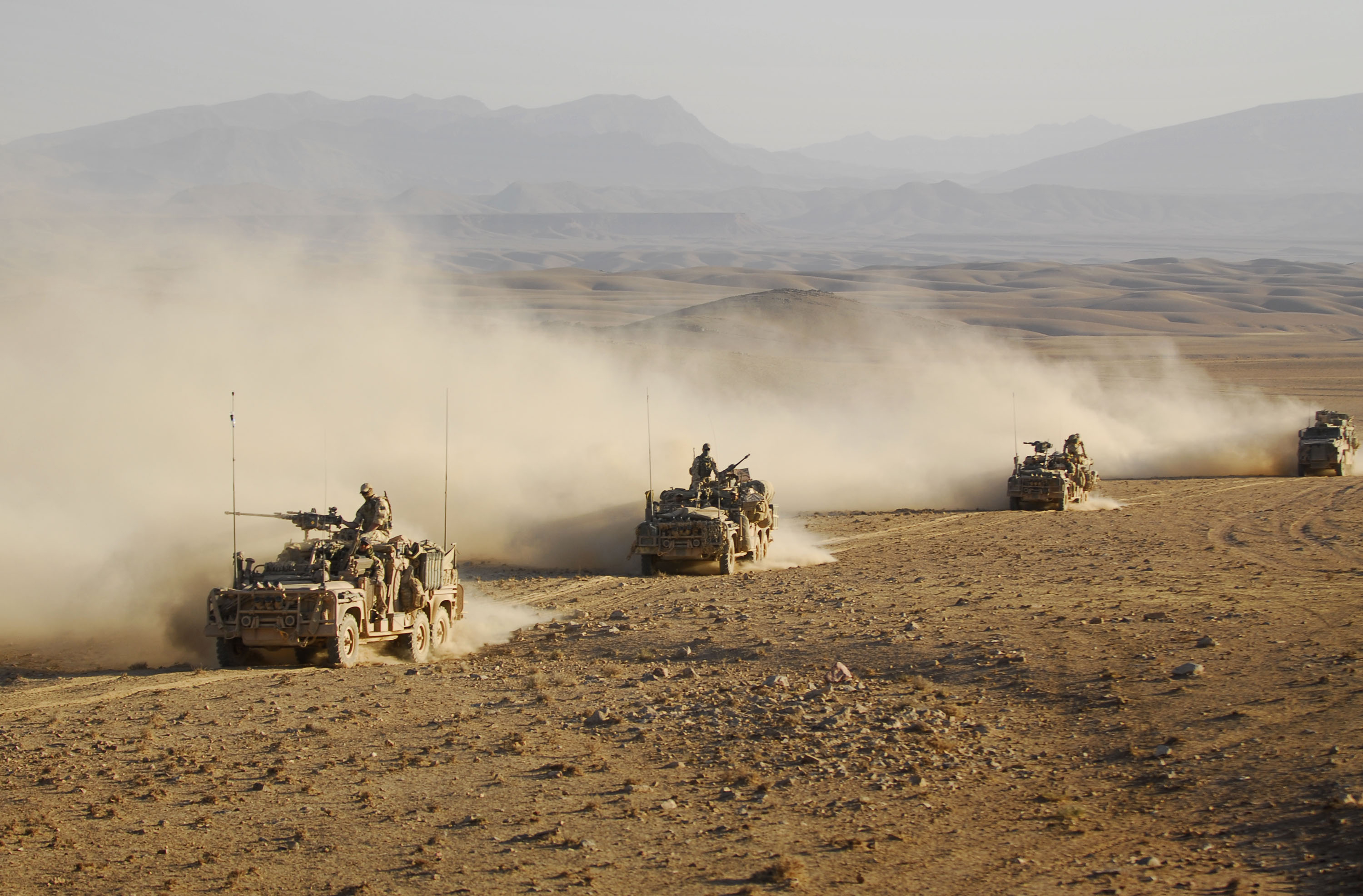
A Special Operations Task Group patrol in Afghanistan in October 2009

- East Timor (May 2006 – 2007)
- Security for the 2006 Commonwealth Games in Melbourne (March 2006)
- Afghanistan (2001–02) (2005–06) (2007–2021)
- Iraq (2003–09) (2014–)
- Security for the 2003 Rugby World Cup (October – November 2003)
- Security for President George W. Bush's visit to Canberra (October 2003)

While Special Operations Command had not formally commenced operations at the time, it appears that the headquarters may have overseen the boarding of the North Korean freighter MV Pong Su in April 2003, which involved elements of both the Special Air Service Regiment and 4th Battalion, Royal Australian Regiment (Commando) Tactical Assault Groups.

In November 2018, the 30th Asia-Pacific Economic Cooperation (APEC) meeting held in Port Moresby in Papua New Guinea had Special Operations Command involvement to enhance the Papua New Guinea Defence Force's Incident Response Group to provide security as world leaders, including Scott Morrison, Mike Pence, Xi Jinping, Dmitry Medvedev and other government and economic leaders were in attendance. The Incident Response Group had received extensive training to build its capabilities in preparation for the meeting from SOCOMD units and the New Zealand Special Operations Component Command.

== Organisation ==
Soldiers from Special Operations Command during a media demonstration in May 2003

As of 2020, the Special Operations Command comprised the following units:

- Headquarters, Special Operations Command Headquarters (SOHQ) (GJBC and Russell Offices)
  - Headquarters, Special Forces Group
    - Special Air Service Regiment (Swanbourne, WA)
      Incorporates the role of Tactical Assault Group (West).
      - 1 Squadron
      - 2 Squadron
      - 3 Squadron
      - 4 Squadron
      - 152 Signals Squadron
      - Specialist Support Squadron
      - Operational Support Squadron
    - 1st Commando Regiment a mixed Regular Army and Army Reserve Unit
      - Regimental Headquarters (Randwick Barracks, Sydney)
      - 1 Commando Company (HMAS Penguin, Sydney)
      - 2 Commando Company (Williamstown, VIC)
      - 301 Signals Squadron (Randwick Barracks, Sydney with elements in the commando companies)
    - 2nd Commando Regiment (Holsworthy, NSW)
      Incorporates the role of Tactical Assault Group (East).
      - A Company
      - B Company
      - C Company
      - D Company
      - 126 Signals Squadron
      - Operations Support Company
      - Logistics Support Company
    - Special Operations Engineer Regiment (Holsworthy, NSW)
      - A Squadron
      - B Squadron
      - Logistic Support Troop
    - Special Operations Logistics Squadron (Holsworthy, NSW)
    - Defence Special Operations Training and Education Centre (Holsworthy, NSW)
      - Australian Defence Force School of Special Operations (Holsworthy, NSW)
      - Australian Defence Force Parachuting School (HMAS Albatross, NSW)

== Special Forces operators ==
As of March 2026, Special Forces operator positions in SOCOMD include:

- Combat Controller
- Special Reconnaissance (Special Air Service Regiment)
- Special Warfare (1st Commando Regiment)
- Strike and Recovery (2nd Commando Regiment)
- Tactical Assault Group Clearance Diver
- Tactical Assault Group Mine Clearance Diver

== Special Operations Commander Australia (SOCAUST) ==
The Special Operations Commander Australia (SOCAUST) is responsible for the peacetime 'raise, train and sustain' functions of Special Operations Command reporting to the Chief of Army, while the Chief of Joint Operations is responsible for the operational functions of Special Operations Command deployments. The SOCAUST is responsible for the domestic counter-terrorism deployments of Special Operations Command reporting directly to the Chief of the Defence Force.

The following have held the position of Special Operations Commander Australia, with the ranks and honours as at the completion of their tenure:

Rank	Name	Post-nominals	Term began	Term ended	Notes
Major General	Duncan Lewis	DSC, CSC	May 2002	October 2004	
Major General	Mike Hindmarsh	AO, CSC	October 2004	February 2008	
Major General	Tim McOwan	DSC, CSM	February 2008	January 2011	
Major General	Gus Gilmore	AO, DSC	January 2011	September 2013	
Brigadier	Daniel McDaniel	DSC, DSM	September 2013	December 2014	Acting
Major General	Jeff Sengelman	DSC, AM, CSC	December 2014	June 2017	
Major General	Adam Findlay	AM	June 2017	November 2020	
Major General	Paul Kenny	DSC, AM, DSM	November 2020	12 July 2024	
Major General	Garth Gould	CSC, DSM	12 July 2024	Incumbent	

== See also ==
- Special Operations Command (New Zealand)
- United States Special Operations Command Pacific
- Canadian Special Operations Forces Command
