= 1st Commando Regiment =

Unit of the Australian Army Reserve

- 1st Commando Regiment cap badge
- Active: 24 February 1955 (as 1 and 2 Cdo Coy); 1 February 1981–present (as 1st Cdo Regt)
- Country: Australia
- Branch: Australian Army Reserve
- Type: Special forces
- Role: Special operations
- Size: One regiment: Two commando companies
- Part of: Special Forces Group
- Garrison/HQ: Sydney and Melbourne
- Motto: Strike Swiftly
- March: 1 Cdo Coy – "Sari Marais"; 2 Cdo Coy – "Cockleshell Heroes"
- Engagements: Afghanistan

Commanders
- Notable commanders: William "Mac" Grant; Phillip Bennett; Martin Hamilton-Smith; Jack H Skipper MC; Harry Smith MC

Insignia
- Unit colour patch
- Abbreviation: 1 Cdo Regt

The 1st Commando Regiment (1 Cdo Regt) is an Australian Army Reserve special forces unit and is part of Special Operations Command. The regiment has an integrated structure of regular (full-time) Australian Army soldiers and reserve (part-time) soldiers. 1st and 2nd Commando Companies were raised in 1955 and were combined with 126 Signal Squadron (SF) in 1981 to form the 1st Cdo Regt. The regiment's two commando companies are the oldest sub-units within Special Operations Command. In 2008, the regiment deployed to Afghanistan to become the first Australian Army Reserve force element on combat operations since World War II. The regiment is the Command's capability lead for Special Warfare.

== Role ==
The primary role of 1st Commando Regiment is Special Warfare. It specialises in unconventional warfare, intelligence gathering and working in small teams alongside regional partners.

In the early to mid 2020s, the regiment transitioned its primary role to special warfare following a review of Special Operations Command (SOCOMD). The regiment's primary role had been the conduct of large scale offensive operations and it had been trained and equipped to carry out commando operations up to company strength. One of its roles had always been the ability to carry out special warfare operations such as training regional partners and supporting indigenous forces.

During the period from the early 2000s to the early 2010s, combat operations and the evolution of the commando role changed the character of the regiment. The regiment revised reserve training following combat operations, to align training standards with the full-time 2nd Commando Regiment (2 Cdo Regt), and to provide a higher level of readiness for the regiment, however, this affected recruitment due to the long full-time commitment and became optional.

The regiment revised its training after its primary role changed to Special Warfare and introduced a special warfare training course for both full-time and reserve soldiers. The colour of its beret was changed to khaki to reflect its new primary role.

== History ==
=== Origins ===
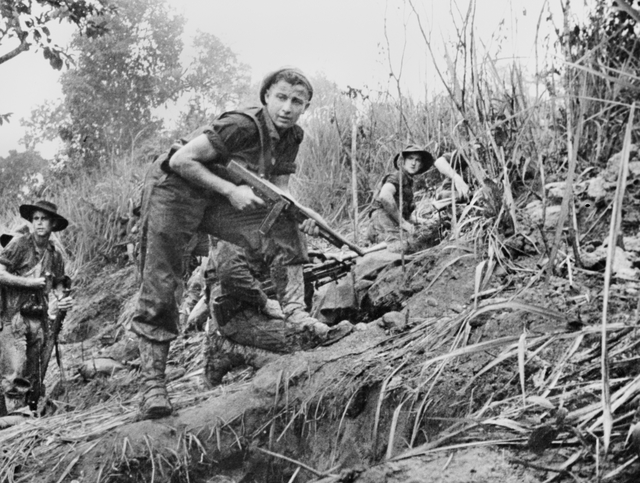
Australian commandos in New Guinea during World War II

Derived from the South African/Dutch word used by the Boers identifying their irregular sized raiding forces employed against the British during the South African Wars, the term "commando" was adopted by newly formed British raiding forces during World War II, and subsequently used by Australian special units raised to fight in the South-west Pacific and Indian Oceans. By the close of World War II, Australian special forces units included the Independent Companies (later Commando Squadrons), Z Special Unit under Special Operations Australia and M Special Unit under Allied Intelligence Bureau.

By the early 1950s, it was deemed necessary by the Army to maintain the techniques and skills that had been developed during the war. Consequently, on 16 September 1954, the Military Board issued the authority to raise two Citizen Military Force (CMF) (Note: The name of the CMF was changed to Australian Army Reserve in 1980.) commando companies: the 1 Commando Company (1 Cdo Coy) in Sydney and the 2 Commando Company (2 Cdo Coy) in Melbourne. Both would be commanded by regular army officers and regular army would form the training and administrative cadre. The companies were to be independent of each other and report to different commands.

The established strength for the companies was to be 265 all ranks, consisting of one major, five captains (three of them platoon commanders), six sergeants and 241 other ranks. This establishment was very similar to the Independent Companies of World War II, which had had an establishment of 17 officers and 256 other ranks.

1 Cdo Coy was raised at Victoria Barracks, Sydney, in New South Wales on 24 February 1955, moving to lower Georges Height's later that year; however, the officer commanding, Major William Harold (Mac) Grant decided that the official birthday would be their first parade on Friday 15 July 1955 at Victoria Barracks. Major Grant was a World War II commando veteran having served in the 2/5 Independent Company and 2/12th Commando Squadron. 2 Cdo Coy was raised in Victoria on 24 February 1955 under the command of Major Peter Seddon and first paraded on 7 July 1955. Seddon was appointed for only 12 months with his successor to be Major Jack Anderson.

In October 1955, Grant and Anderson, along with two Warrant Officers Class II Ernie Tarr and Ron Smith, travelled to the United Kingdom to train with the Royal Marines (RM). At the same time, two RM sergeants Mac McDermott and Len Holmes, the latter being Special Boat Service (SBS) trained, travelled to Australia to provide commando training with Holmes-based with 1 Cdo Coy and McDermott with 2 Cdo Coy. (Note: In 1955, McDermott and Holmes also provided commando and beach reconnaissance training on the Clearance Diving Course for the Navy's Clearance Diving Branch.) Anderson was drowned during the last week of the basic commando course and was replaced by Major John Hutcheson. In May 1956, Grant and Hutcheson returned to Australia after six months of training having been awarded the green beret by 42 Commando. Tarr and Smith undertook 12 months of training, including with the Cliff Assault Wing and the SBS, returning to Australia in November 1956 to become training instructors.

Grant has said that the defence planning staff convinced the government to form the commando companies with the role "...of conducting clandestine operations similar to those mounted by special operations also those of the Independent Companies/Commando Squadrons. It was envisaged that by raising units capable of performing such a dual role, a pool of trained manpower would be available to be "farmed off" as necessary to a special operations unit while the remainder would be used in more conventional commando operations." The Australian Secret Intelligence Service had earlier been formed in 1952 within the Department of Defence whose role included ".. plan for and conduct special operations..".

Commando courses included basic parachutist, diving, small scale raids, demolitions, climbing and roping and unarmed combat. 1 Cdo Coy held the first diving course in November/December 1957 using a pure oxygen re-breather the Swimmer Canoeist Breathing Apparatus borrowed from the Navy based on training received from the SBS.

In 1957, as the unit already had the designation "1st" within its title, the Army thought it would be a convenient framework on which to re-form the Australian Imperial Force's 1st Battalion. So on 1 December 1957 the unit was re-designated the 1st Infantry Battalion (Commando), keeping this title until 22 August 1966 when the unit was renamed the 1st Battalion, The Royal New South Wales Regiment (Commando), City of Sydney's Own Regiment. Finally in May 1973 the unit name at last changed back to the former designation of the 1 Commando Company. In 1958, the 1st Commando Company provided the initial training for the recently formed 1st Special Air Service Company, the Royal Australian Regiment.

On the evening of 17 February 1960, 74 commandos from 2 Cdo Coy set off in kayaks, amphibious DUKW (ducks) and zodiacs on a training exercise from Point Lonsdale to Point Nepean in Victoria simulating a raid on the Officer Cadet School (OCS), Portsea, which involved them crossing the infamous Rip at the entrance to Port Phillip Bay. The weather changed without warning and the watercraft were swept out to sea through the Port Phillip Heads encountering massive seas that capsized most watercraft. Nearly all commandos were rescued except three who drowned. 2nd Commando Company developed a Mountain Leader's Course in ski patrolling, as well as rock, ice and snow climbing.

In 1968, 2 Cdo Coy moved to Fort Gellibrand at Williamstown from Ripponlea. The company had originally been based at Sandringham then sometime between 1957 and 1958 moved to HMAS Cerberus before moving to Ripponlea in 1958.

=== 301st and 126th Signal Squadrons ===
The requirement for long-range communications can be traced back to WWII and units such as Coastwatchers, New Guinea Air Warning Wireless Company, the Independent Companies, and Z Special Unit. On 30 April 1958, a decision was made to raise No 1 Independent Signals Squadron to support clandestine operations and this led to the formation of 301st Signal Squadron (Home Defence) in 1960 at Lidcombe, New South Wales. This new squadron was to meet the requirement for 'special communications' and was charged with the responsibility of providing long-range communications for commando-type operations and was augmented with regular army members in 1963. In December 1964, 301st Signal Squadron was re-designated 126th Signal Squadron, later to 126th Signal Squadron (Special Forces) in January 1966 and subsequently relocated to Albert Park, Victoria and in 1972 to Simpson Barracks in Watsonia, Victoria. Women had been serving in the signals squadron since 1964 as cipher clerks and from 1968 as radio operators. In 1978, the signals squadron was provided with approval to wear the green beret with the Corps of Signals badge. In 1981, signaller Kerry Hiam became the first woman to qualify and be awarded a green beret.

=== Borneo and Vietnam ===
Prior to formation as a regiment, the sub units deployed individuals and small teams to the Borneo confrontation and the Vietnam War. During the Borneo confrontation, Sergeant Ted Blacker of 126th Signal Squadron (Special Forces) was awarded the British Empire Medal. From 1965 the Commando Companies contributed numerous instructors, including from their reserve part-time component, to the Australian Army Training Team Vietnam (AATTV). Two lost their lives with the AATTV, with Warrant Officer Class II John Durrington being killed in action, and Warrant Officer Class II Ron Scott dying of wounds. Whilst serving with the AATTV, Warrant Officer Class II Ray Simpson, formerly from both the Special Air Service Regiment (SASR) and the 1st Commando Company, was awarded the Victoria Cross for an action in the Kontum Province on 6 May 1969.

=== Formation of Regimental Headquarters ===
All sub-units operated independently, training Army Reserve commandos and special forces signalers until 1981 when it was determined a regimental headquarters was required. This headquarters would coordinate the efforts of the previously independent units and provide the east coast command element for the newly established counter-terrorist capability within the SASR. The headquarters was established on 1 February 1981 and from 1 July 1981 was based at Randwick Barracks in Randwick, New South Wales. 126 Signal Squadron (Special Forces) was renamed 126 Signal Squadron.

In 1991, a 1 Cdo Coy commando who had joined the British Army Special Air Service was in the well-known Bravo Two Zero patrol in Iraq as part of Operation Desert Storm.

In 1992, 126 Signal Squadron qualified signallers were given approval to wear the commando badge.

Commencing in February 1997, 1 Cdo Regt provided the initial training for the re-role of the 4th Battalion, Royal Australian Regiment (4RAR) from an infantry battalion into commando 4RAR (Cdo) raising the Commando Training Wing (the predecessor to the Special Forces Training Centre) commanded by Major Hans Fleer.

In July 1997, three women officers, Lieutenants Fellows, Warren-Smith and Woods, became the first women to complete the commando officer selection course. The women were barred from serving in combat roles.

In 1998, the Army dropped plans to raise a third reserve company in Queensland for the regiment due to a lack of resources.

In September 1999, 126 Signal Squadron became an independent unit providing support to 1 Cdo Regt and 4RAR Cdo reporting directly to Headquarters Special Operations. In 2000, the squadron transitioned to a Regular Army unit based at Holsworthy Barracks under the command of 4RAR Cdo. In June 2002, 301 Signal Squadron was re-raised at Randwick Barracks to provide communications and information systems and electronic warfare to facilitate the command and control of special operations conducted by the regiment.

In 2006, 1 Cdo Coy relocated from Georges Heights in Mosman to HMAS Penguin in Balmoral.

=== Recent operations ===
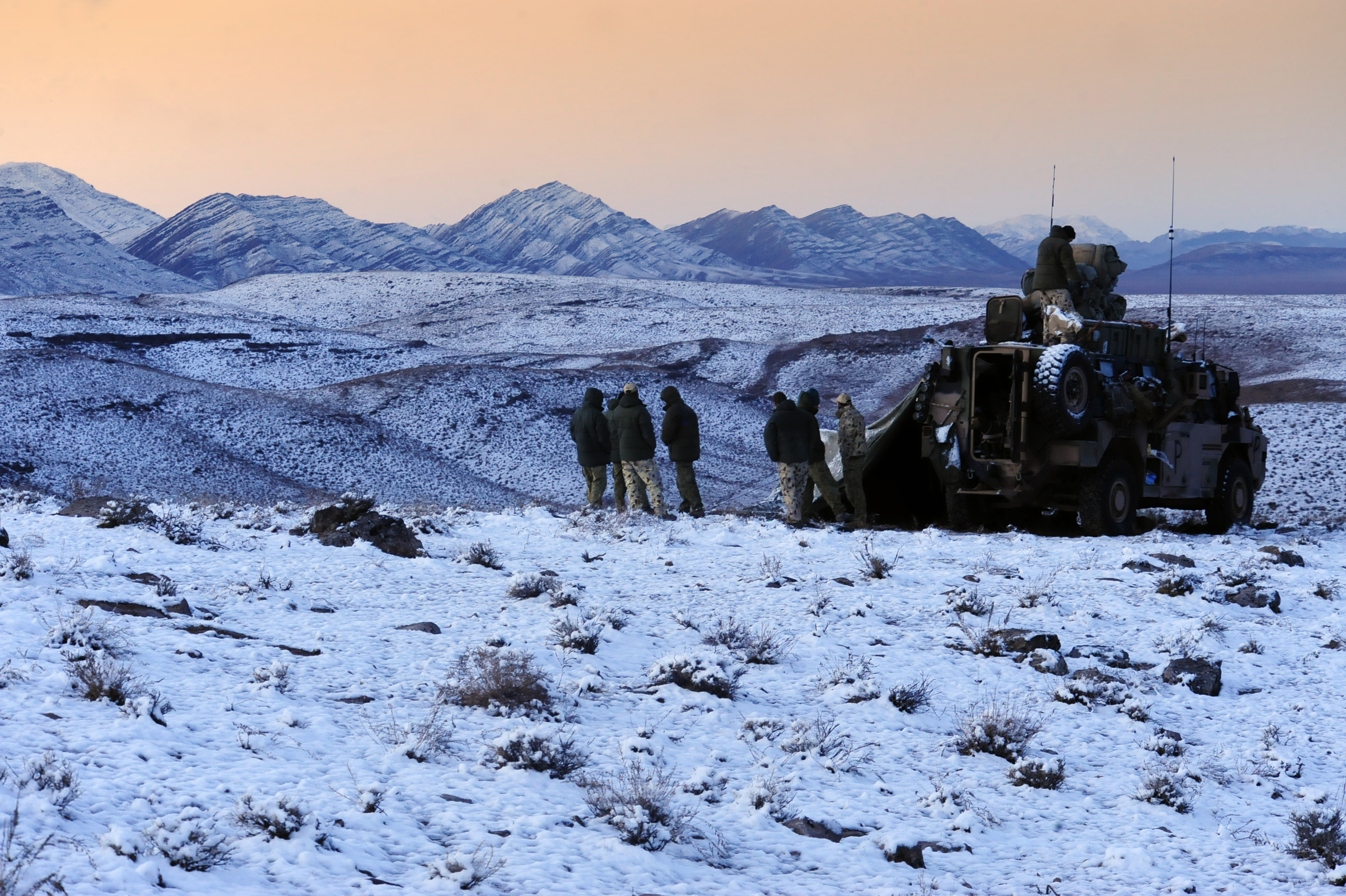
Special Operations Task Group in Afghanistan during 2009-10 winter with Bushmaster vehicle

In recent years, the regiment has provided small detachments and individuals to peacekeeping missions. Deployments in the region, include to Bougainville as part of Operation Bel-Isi, to Timor Leste (East Timor) in 2001 as part of Operation Tanager with the regiment providing a substantial reinforcement to A Company 4RAR (Cdo), which had been re-roled from commando to light infantry, of one officer and forty-one Regular Army and Army Reserve commandos, and to the Solomon Islands as part of Operation Anode.

In May 2006, following unrest in Timor Leste, a Special Forces component consisting of a commando company from 4RAR Cdo and a SASR troop deployed to Timor Leste as peacekeepers as part of Operation Astute. The Special Forces component was later reduced and supplemented by 1 Cdo Regt teams often commanded by a member of the 1 Cdo Regt. In March 2007, the Special Forces component was bolstered to form an Apprehension Task Group with the purpose of apprehending ex-Timorese Army Major and rebel leader, Alfredo Reinado, at the request of the Timor Leste government. Reinado was located in the village of Same and approval was given to assault his compound. Reinado evaded capture but four of his men were killed in the battle. For the commandos of the 1 Cdo Regt who participated in the mission the battle was the first combat seen by the unit (at greater than individual level). Over a hundred Army Reserve commandos from the regiment served in Operation Astute during this period.

In late 2008, the regiment deployed an entire Commando Company Group to the Special Operations Task Group (SOTG) in Afghanistan during the Afghan winter as part of Operation Slipper to relieve the SOTG that had up until then consisted of rotating SASR and 2 Cdo Regt elements. This constituted the first deployment of an Australian Army Reserve Force Element on combat operations since World War II. The composition of the SOTG was structured into elements with the regiment's contribution designated Force Element Charlie. Force Element Charlie provided the main SOTG element for the following winter rotations in 2009-2010 and 2010-2011 conducting population-centric operations. The regiment also contributed commandos to the 2 Cdo Regt to reinforce their element designated Force Element Bravo. The regiment served in six SOTG rotations. A rotation ranged between four and five months.

The first Afghan deployment was composed of 1 Cdo Coy personnel supplemented by 2 Cdo Coy personnel for SOTG Rotation VIII. It was commanded by the Major OC 1 Cdo Coy and arrived in November 2008 for a four-month tour of duty until February 2009. On 27 November 2008, Lieutenant Michael Fussell, a specialist Joint Terminal Attack Controller (JTAC) from 4RAR Cdo serving in the Commando Company Group, was killed in action after he stood on an IED during a night infiltration onto a target. Following Fussell's death several senior personnel asked to be relieved of their positions due to concerns over the Major and after an inquiry into the death, the Major was relieved of his command and returned to Australia. The inquiry raised issues into the Commando Company Group outside the scope of its terms that instigated the appointment of Vice Admiral (retired) Chris Ritchie to conduct a further inquiry that found that the Group had been inadequately trained and prepared for its deployment, and that concerns over the Major's leadership should have been acted on before the Group deployed.

On 4 January 2009, the regiment suffered its first combat fatality when Private Gregory Sher (2 Cdo Coy) was killed by a rocket attack into a patrol base. On 12 February 2009, the Group conducted a night compound clearance in the Sorkh Morghab region with elements of the Afghan National Army and with Afghan interpreters. Corporal W saw, through a window, a male holding an AK-47 rifle pointed at a door that his team was preparing to use to enter the room to clear and fired at him through the window with his rifle. The male returned fire and ignored calls made for him to come out. With fire continuing, and the team being unable to retreat, two grenades were thrown by Lance Corporal M to clear the room. The room was entered, whereupon soldiers found women and children present, with five fatalities (three children and two babies) having been inflicted, along with the male, Amrullah Khan, a farmer whose family claimed had no affiliation with the Taliban. The Australian Director of Military Prosecutions, Brigadier Lyn McDade, decided to charge two members of the regiment, Sergeant J, who gave the order to use grenades, and Lance Corporal M, who threw the grenades, with manslaughter as a result of an investigation into the engagement, coming to the view that they ought to have known, and during the attack then certainly have been aware that women and children were in the room. The charges against the two soldiers were dismissed pre-trial by the Judge Advocate in June 2011. Charges against Lieutenant Colonel M who, based in Kandahar, ordered the clearance of the compound, were withdrawn in August 2011 for disobeying standard operating procedures to prevent innocent Afghan nationals in their homes being wrongfully targeted.

== Customs and traditions ==
In February 2025, the Special Warfare khaki beret became the primary headdress. Prior to this, the Sherwood Green Commando beret was worn as the primary headdress, formally recognising Commando qualification. The Army sought permission from the Royal Marines to wear the green beret which was provided on 27 July 1955 by the Commandant General, Royal Marines. The first green beret awarded in Australia was presented to Captain George Cardy, then Adjutant/Quartermaster of 1st Commando Company, at Victoria Barracks, Sydney on 14 July 1956. Incidentally, Sgt Len Holmes RM, who won the coveted King's Badge on his RM qualifying course in the UK, was awarded the second green beret presented on that parade, exchanging it for the dark blue SBS beret.

The Director of Infantry advised that the Infantry Corps badge should not be worn and that the commandos should have their own badge. A regimental badge was created featuring a silver World War II-era fighting knife surmounted by a gold boomerang engraved with the regimental motto "Strike Swiftly". The motto was conceived by Major Mac Grant, the first commander of 1st Commando Company, from reading the book "Swiftly They Struck" and agreed to by Major Peter Seddon, his opposite number in the 2nd Commando Company. The badge was a combination of two proposals from a competition, one from Melbourne and one from Sydney, conceived by Grant with agreement from Seddon. Members wear a Garter Blue lanyard on the left shoulder of dress uniforms in common with the other combat units of SOCOMD. In 1991, distinctive black and green commando parachute wings were adopted and are now worn by all parachute qualified commandos.

While there is no direct lineage to the 1st Battalion, AIF, other than in the 1st Commando Company's renaming to the 1st Battalion (Commando), the regiment retains the colours of the battalion's World War I colour patch – black over green – which are highlighted on the current 1 Cdo Regt flag.

== Organisation ==
The Regiment consists of a headquarters, two commando companies and a signals squadron with a strength about 450. It is organised as follows:

- Regimental Headquarters located at Randwick Barracks in Randwick, New South Wales
- 1 Commando Company (1 Cdo Coy) located at HMAS Penguin in Balmoral, New South Wales
- 2 Commando Company (2 Cdo Coy) located in the historic Fort Gellibrand at Williamstown, Victoria
- 301 Signal Squadron (301 Sig Sqn) headquarters at Randwick Barracks and elements of the squadron are located with 1 Cdo Coy, 2 Cdo Coy, Canberra and the Special Operations Engineer Regiment

Each commando company consists of a headquarters, two commando platoons, a reconnaissance platoon, a training platoon and integral combat service support elements. Combat elements of the regiment typically operate in platoon to company sized force elements. These will be force tailored by requirement and may not fit any doctrinal size or command and control. The signal squadron has the largest full-time contingent in the regiment.

Reserve support roles include clerical, logistics, transport, medical, intelligence, linguistics and information systems.

== Equipment ==
1 Cdo Regt is equipped similar to 2 Cdo Regt with a range of weapon systems that allows it to tailor requirements based on mission needs. These include the M4A1 5.56mm carbine, which can be fitted with a M203 40 mm grenade launcher, and the Heckler & Koch USP 9mm pistol as primary weapons. Specialist weapons include the Heckler & Koch HK417 7.62mm rifle, Heckler & Koch MP5SD silenced submachine gun, Accuracy International SR98 7.62mm sniper rifle, SR-25 7.62mm sniper rifle and Barrett M82 12.7mm anti-materiel rifle. Support weapons include the Minimi 5.56mm light machine gun, Maximi 7.62mm machine gun, MAG 58 7.62mm medium machine gun, M2HB QCB 12.7mm heavy machine gun, M3 Carl Gustav 84mm anti-tank weapon, Mk 47 Striker automatic grenade launcher, Javelin anti-tank weapon, and the M72 LAW 66mm rocket launcher The primary commando watercraft is the Zodiac F470 inflatable boat.

== Recruitment ==
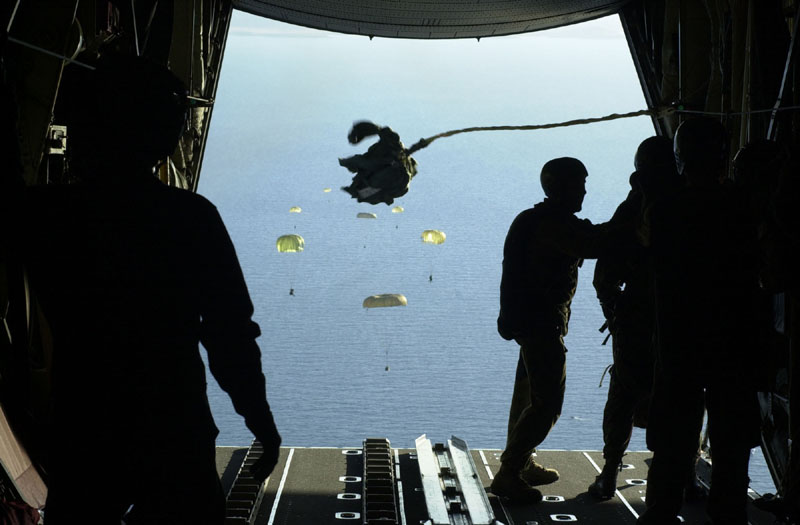
Commandos from 1st Commando Company parachute with inflatable boats from an RAAF C-130H into Shoalwater Bay during an exercise in 2001

The regiment is the only reserve SOCOMD combat unit providing reservists based in the eastern states of Australia the opportunity to serve in a commando unit. Additionally, the regiment provides discharging Regular Army SOCOMD soldiers the opportunity to continue to serve in SOCOMD in a reserve capacity on their return to civilian life. Before the raising of 2 Cdo Regt, the regiment's Regular Army cadre consisted of soldiers transferred from the SASR.

Changes introduced to reserve training after combat operations in Afghanistan, required candidates to complete the 332-day continuous full-time Commando Initial Employment Training course the same as their 2 Cdo Regt Regular Army counterparts. However, this provided reserve candidates with the opportunity to consider service in the Regular Army with 2 Cdo Regt with many candidates destined for the regiment instead choosing 2 Cdo Regt. Also, the long full-time commitment discouraged Reservists from considering joining the regiment.

In 2015, Army: the soldiers' newspaper reported the regiment had begun its biggest reserve recruitment drive in over 10 years. A training regime similar to the one prior to Afghanistan operations, was introduced with candidates after completing the selection course posted to the regiment and given a three-year term to complete training. The regiment was also re-raising training platoons in each of the commando companies to host Army Reserve aspirants training for selection.

In addition, in 2016 Australian Infantry Magazine reported that direct civilian recruiting would recommence with prospective commandos undergoing Reserve Recruit Training Course at Kapooka before parading at the regiment in the training platoon to prepare to complete the Infantry Initial Employment Training (IET) to became a qualified Infantry rifleman the same as serving Reservists in the training platoons.

== Selection and training ==
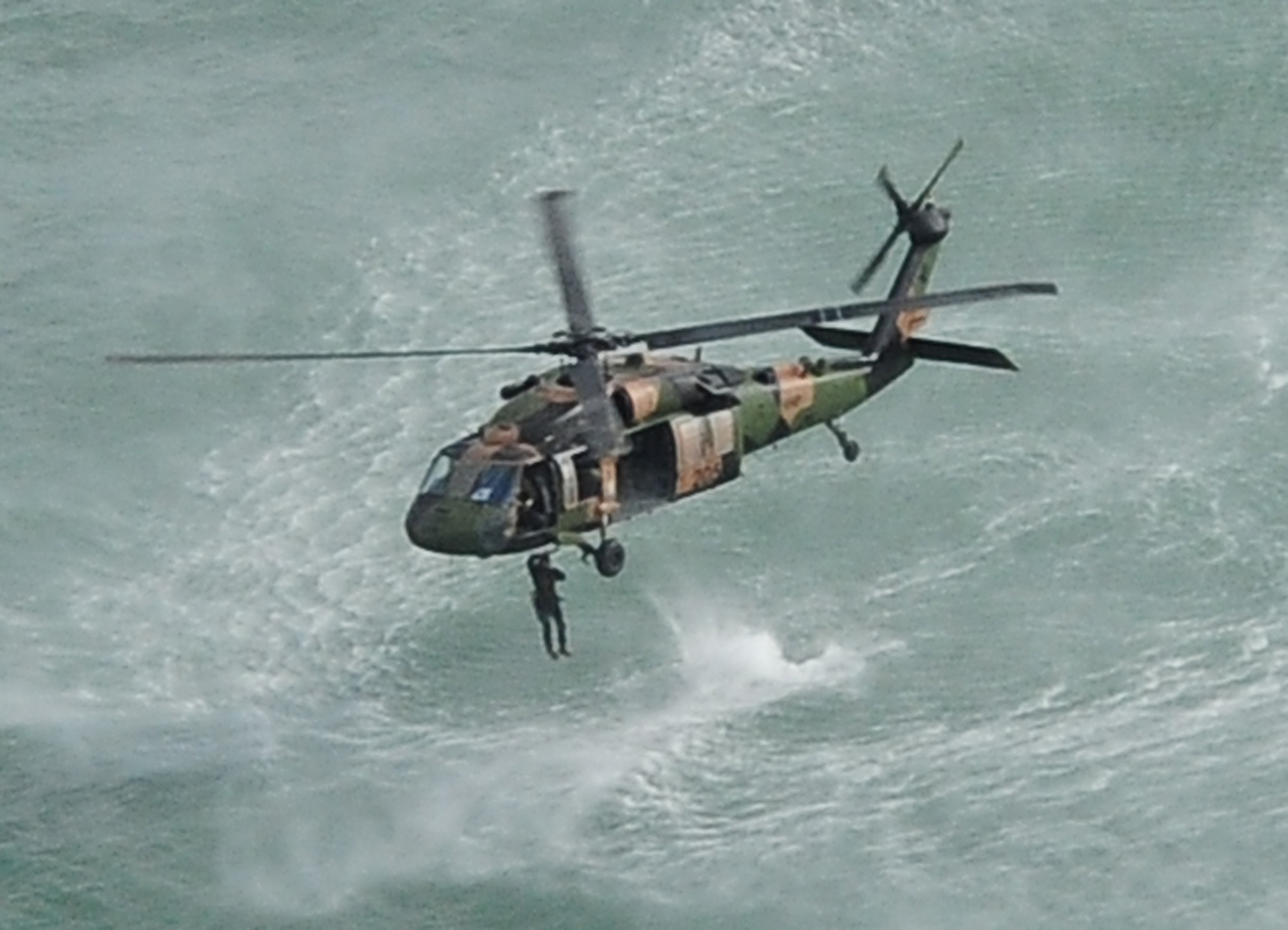
A Commando helocasting from a Black Hawk helicopter into Shoalwater Bay during Exercise Talisman Saber 2013

To prepare for selection, training platoon candidates have 12 months to complete the Special Forces Reserve Training Program, based on the 2 Cdo Regt Special Forces Direct Recruitment 12-week Special Forces Accelerated Infantry Training Program, including the 17-week Commando Physical Training Package.

The first stage of selection is to successfully pass the one-day Special Forces Entry Test. The second stage of selection is successfully completing the Commando Selection Course conducted over two weeks.

Commando Initial Employment training (also called the "reinforcement cycle") commences after successful completion of the Commando Selection Course. Candidates have three years to successfully complete the course. This cycle consists of numerous courses including: the "Special Forces Weapons Course, Advanced Close Quarter Battle Course, Commando Team Tactics Course, Commando Urban Operations Course, Close Quarter Fighting Course, Commando Demolitions and Breaching Course, Special Forces Basic Parachute Course (including water insertion training), Commando Amphibious Operators Course, Special Forces Military Roping Course, and Combat First Aid or Special Forces Signal Course". Candidates have the option of completing the reinforcement cycle over 12 months full-time training with their 2 Cdo Regt counterparts.

After the successful completion of Commando Initial Employment Training, the Green beret is awarded and reservists will report to the regiment on a frequent basis to maintain their skills. As a qualified Commando there are specialist courses available to complete, including but not limited to: advanced driving, mortars, cold weather / mountaineering, language training and free fall parachuting.

New signallers to 301st Signal Squadron have to complete the Special Forces Signaller Course (SFSC).

== Documentaries ==
- Holden, Roger (director); Montgomery, James (writer) (1985). Strike Swiftly (Television documentary). The Jaypat Studio.
- Humphrey, Sonia (producer and director) (1991). Till Something Breaks (Television documentary). Film Australia Limited.
