= Special Operations Component Command (New Zealand) =

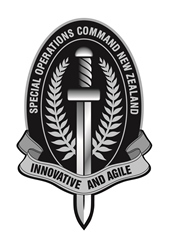
- Active: 2008 – current
- Country: New Zealand
- Part of: New Zealand Defence Force
- Mottos: Innovative and Agile

Special Operations Component Command (SOCNZ) provides command and oversight of the New Zealand Defence Force's special forces unit, the 1st New Zealand Special Air Service Regiment, and reports to the Commander Joint Forces New Zealand for operations. Led by a Colonel (Special Operations Component Commander, SOCC). It was initially established in 2008 as the Directorate of Special Operations, and had its role expanded when it was re-designated Special Operations Component Command on 1 July 2015.

== History and role ==
On 25 August 2008, the Directorate of Special Operations was established as an element of the Headquarters New Zealand Defence Force. The NZDF's website states that the role of the directorate was to "reduce the operational and strategic burden" on the commander of the New Zealand Special Air Service (NZSAS), and that the directorate provided a "strategic-level special operations headquarters".

The Directorate of Special Operations was renamed the Special Operations Component Command on 1 July 2015. This change in designation was accompanied by a significant expansion of the unit's role, with the SOCC becoming equivalent to the NZDF's Maritime, Land and Air Component Commanders. The SOCC reports to the Commander Joint Forces New Zealand for operations, and the Chief of the Defence Force and Chief of Army for other functions. The 1st New Zealand Special Air Service Regiment also reports directly to the SOCC. The SOCNZ maintains a Special Operations Liaison Element in Headquarters Joint Forces New Zealand, and is responsible for the NZDF's counter-improvised explosive device capabilities. The SOCNZ badge and motto remained the same as the Directorate's with the name amended.

== See also ==
- Special Operations Command (Australia)
- United States Special Operations Command
- United Kingdom Special Forces
- Canadian Special Operations Forces Command
