= EM Solutions =

Satellite communications component company

Coordinates: 27°31′44″S 153°0′14″E

EM Solutions Pty Ltd.
- Type: Private
- Industry: Communications, Defense
- Founded: 1998; 28 years ago
- Founders: Dr John Ness; Peter Bradley
- Headquarters: Brisbane, Queensland, Australia
- Area served: Worldwide
- Key people: Dr Rowan Gilmore (CEO); Dr John Ness (CTO); Peter Bradley (chief engineer)
- Products: SATCOM, SOTM, satellite terminals, VSAT, microwave components, BUCs and LNBs
- Number of employees: 50+

EM Solutions Pty Ltd is a satellite communications component company based in Brisbane, Queensland, Australia. Founded in 1998, it is involved in the research, design, and production of differentiated microwave and radiofrequency products and systems for satellite and broadband communications.

The firm provides components for both commercial and military customers with its subsidiary, EMClarity, specialising in the broadcast industry. It has partnered with the Defence Science and Technology Group (DSTO), the Commonwealth Scientific and Industrial Research Organisation (CSIRO), and the University of Queensland.

== History ==
EM Solutions emerged as a successor to the founders' original company, Mitec Limited, in 1998. Founded in 1984 through the commercialization of the University of Queensland’s Microwave Technology Development Centre, Mitec produced communications products still in use today at companies including Optus and Telstra.

After Mitec's acquisition by Codan Pty Ltd for $30 million in 1998, EM Solutions was founded by Peter Bradley and Dr John Ness. It was acquired by the Australian company Electro Optic Systems (EOS) in October 2019.

In January 2025, it was announced that Cohort had completed its purchase of the company.

== Products ==
EM Solutions initially began developing solid-state power amplifiers, filters, and oscillators, before producing high-speed receivers and transmitters for radios. In 2008, EM Solutions launched its initial foray into SATCOM On-The-Move (SOTM) terminals after being granted sponsorship from the Australian Defence Force to develop a land-mobile Ka-band terminal.

In 2016, subsidiary EMClarity produced the world’s lowest latency 5 Gbit/s, E-band (70 to 80Ghz) microwave radio, the E10G. Now used to connect servers from the New York Stock Exchange (NYSE) to those of Nasdaq Stock Market, this product was created in response to industry requests for lower latency communications networks to equal the speed of computer processing platforms utilized to facilitate financial trades.

EM Solutions was commissioned by a United States government agency to supply E-band radios for ship-to-shore communication. Employing the steerable gimbal systems used in the company’s SATCOM On-The-Move terminals, the radios achieve the longest range and highest data rate of any commercial wireless system at 10 Gbit/s and 20 km, respectively.

In 2015, EM Solutions partnered with leading satellite telecommunications company, Inmarsat, to produce the first dual X- and Ka-bands terminal with universal (land or sea) capability. These terminals have been installed in the Australian Border Force's and the Royal Australian Navy’s Cape Class patrol boats, providing broadband access to crews of these vessels for the first time.
