= 2nd Commando Regiment (Australia) =

Unit of the Australian Army

- Badge of the 2nd Commando Regiment
- Active: 1 February 1997 (as 4 RAR Cdo); 19 June 2009 – present (as 2nd Cdo Regt)
- Country: Australia
- Branch: Australian Army
- Type: Special forces
- Role: Special operations; Counter-terrorism
- Size: One regiment; Approx. 700 personnel
- Part of: Special Forces Group
- Garrison/HQ: Holsworthy Barracks, Sydney
- Mottos: "Foras Admonitio" (Without Warning)
- Engagements: East Timor; • INTERFET; • United Nations Transitional Administration in East Timor; • Operation Astute; War in Afghanistan; • Operation Slipper; • Shah Wali Kot Offensive; 2003 Iraq War; • Operation Falconer; • Operation Catalyst; Military intervention against ISIL; • Operation Okra
- Decorations: Unit Citation for Gallantry; Meritorious Unit Citation

Insignia
- Unit colour patch
- Abbreviation: 2 CDO REGT

The 2nd Commando Regiment (2 Cdo Regt) is a special forces unit of the Australian Army and is part of Special Operations Command. The regiment was established on 19 June 2009 when the 4th Battalion RAR (Commando) was renamed. It is based at Holsworthy, New South Wales. The 2nd Commando Regiment trains and has served with coalition special forces units. The regiment has been involved in operations in East Timor, Iraq and Afghanistan, where it was used in a direct action warfighting role. It has also been involved in domestic security operations including the 2006 Commonwealth Games and the 2014 G20 Leaders Summit. The regiment is the Command's capability lead for strike and recovery.

== Role ==
The 2nd Commando Regiment is one of three combat-capable units within Special Operations Command and operates alongside other SOCOMD elements. The role of the regiment is to conduct strategic strike, domestic counter-terrorism and overseas special recovery operations. (Note: Special recovery is an overseas operation to rescue individuals or equipment.) Army doctrine specifies that the role of commando units is to "span the gap between conventional infantry operations and unconventional operations", focusing on advanced force operations and direct action missions. Originally formed to complement the Special Air Service Regiment (SASR), according to Blaxland, and is designed to be a "self-contained flexible and rapidly deployable force" and is structured for both special operations and domestic counter-terrorism. In its domestic counter-terrorism role it provides the Tactical Assault Group (East) to respond to high-risk incidents on the eastern coast of Australia beyond the capability of state and federal police tactical groups to respond to. The regiment maintains a high readiness element which encompasses the parachute company group role that the 3rd Battalion, Royal Australian Regiment (3 RAR) had maintained before being re-roled as a light infantry battalion. In 2010, the then-Chief of Army stated that as part of the future amphibious ready group based on the Navy's new Canberra-class it will be necessary to rotate a Commando Company to support the infantry battalion.

== History ==
=== Formation ===
In 1995, as part of an expansion of the number of Australian Army infantry battalions, the 2nd/4th Battalion, Royal Australian Regiment—then operating as a standard light infantry battalion—was delinked into separate battalions which resumed their original identities as the 2nd and 4th Battalions. The decision was then taken that the 4th Battalion would become a Regular Army commando unit and on 1 February 1997 the unit was renamed to 4th Battalion, Royal Australian Regiment (Commando) (4 RAR Cdo). The unit would be structured for both conventional operations and domestic counter-terrorism, with an initial establishment of a battalion headquarters, Tactical Assault Group, two commando companies, logistic support company, operational support company and a signal squadron. Initially, both Regular and Reserve members were given the opportunity to undertake special forces training provided by the Commando Training Wing of the Reserve 1st Commando Regiment, or elect to be posted to a conventional forces unit. In 1998, General Reserve positions ceased to exist in the new structure, and reserve members discharged or posted to other reserve units. It was planned that 4 RAR (Cdo) would eventually take over the SASR counter terrorist role.

The initial years were busy with the unit creating a structure and recruiting members suitable for commando training, while conducting sub-unit and unit training activities. B Company was raised in 1997, followed by C Company in 1999, both of which took 24 months to reach full maturity. A small team from 4 RAR (Cdo) deployed to East Timor as part of the International Force for East Timor (INTERFET) in September 1999 providing close personal protection for the media and also as interpreters in the initial months. In 2000, elements were involved in the evacuation of Australian nationals from the Solomon Islands in June. While later that year, 4 RAR (Cdo) assisted with counter-terrorism at the Sydney Olympic Games as part of Joint Task Force 114, with C Company on standby as a response force such as providing a cordon around an incident site in support of the SASR. In 2000, it was decided that the counter terrorist role should remain with the SASR. A period of rapid capability development, equipment acquisition and training subsequently followed. The unit that was developed as a result is highly regarded by coalition special operation forces abroad, and has conducted operations in East Timor, Iraq and Afghanistan. It has also been awarded citations for bravery and meritorious service.

On 19 June 2009, the battalion was renamed the 2nd Commando Regiment. Regardless, the name 4 RAR remains on the Army's order of battle and its history, colours and traditions have been preserved, ready to be re-raised as a regular infantry battalion in the future if required. All awards and battle honours received during the time as 4 RAR (Cdo) were passed onto the 2nd Commando Regiment, while those awarded before the transformation to a commando battalion were retained by 4 RAR.

=== East Timor ===
The 2nd Commando Regiment, then known as 4 RAR (Cdo), was deployed as a part of the United Nations Transitional Administration in East Timor (UNTAET) in 2001. When notified to replace 1 RAR in East Timor, 4 RAR had not long previously been raised as a commando battalion, developing special forces capabilities to supplement those of the SASR. With the commitment to East Timor continuing, 4 RAR was re-roled as a light infantry battalion for deployment to East Timor as AUSBATT IV. This involved reorganising from the existing two commando-companies structure to a light infantry battalion with four companies and a growth in the unit from 220 to 670 personnel. This saw B and C Company remain commando-qualified. A Company was formed in June 2000 followed by D Company in November both filled with Regular infantry soldiers posted in to the unit. The battalion took official control over Area of Operations (AO) Matilda in the northern border region on 25 April under the command of Lieutenant Colonel Jeff Sengelman.

During its time deployed as a part of UNTAET, the battalion established a security partnership with the East Timorese, focusing strongly on languages and maintaining the relationships previous Australian battalions had established, as well as transferring new technologies to the local security forces. This "intelligence-led" but "people-focused" approach saw the battalion group conduct the majority of its operations in close proximity to the Tactical Coordination Line (TCL) on the border with Indonesian West Timor. The battalion saw few contacts while in East Timor. These included a TCL violation on 5 May 2001 which was intercepted by a section from D Company, an outbreak of violence involving a grenade attack by militia members at the Maubasa markets on 29 May which resulted in several people killed and about 50 wounded, and shallow cross-border militia raids in June, including an attack on a section patrol from A Company. The battalion was withdrawn and replaced in October 2001.

=== Expansion and domestic security ===
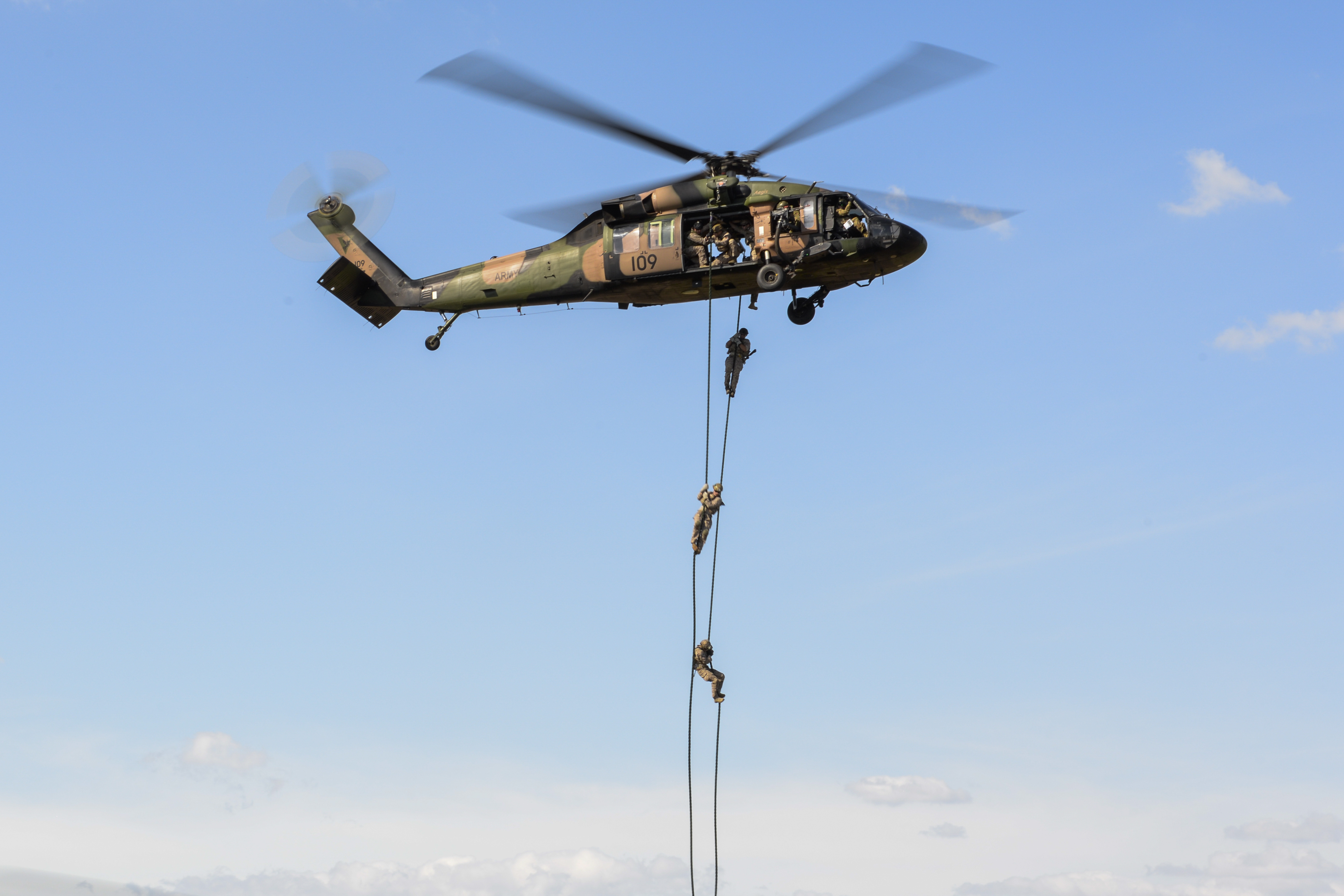
Commandos fast rope from a 171st Aviation Squadron Blackhawk helicopter during Exercise Talisman Sabre in 2015

Following the battalion's return from East Timor it was again restructured to resume its role as a two-company commando battalion. In 2001 the Australian Government directed the permanent establishment of a second TAG to be based on the east coast of Australia. The TAG is supplemented by clearance divers from the Navy Clearance Diving Branch who form the Water Troop. A Company was subsequently raised as a commando company in 2002.

Following the creation of SOCOMD in 2002 and the Bali bombings in October that year, further resources became available. The battalion was subsequently involved in security operations for the Commonwealth Heads of Government Meeting (CHOGM) in Queensland in 2002. Elements of the battalion were also involved in the boarding of a North Korean freighter, the MV Pong Su—which was suspected of drug smuggling—off Newcastle on 20 April 2003. (Note: Commanded by CO 4 RAR (Cdo), the operation involved members of TAG (West), TAG (East) and the Incident Response Regiment.) In 2005, a fourth commando company (D Company) was raised. Later, the battalion was tasked with supporting the security arrangements for the 2006 Commonwealth Games in Melbourne. In 2014, elements of the regiment were deployed to Brisbane to protect the G20 Leaders Summit held in the city on 15 and 16 November.

=== Iraq ===
The battalion provided a commando force element as part of the Australian contribution to the 2003 invasion of Iraq, known as Operation Falconer. A reinforced commando platoon formed an element of the Australian Special Forces Task Group (SFTG), which also included 1 Squadron, SASR, a troop from the Incident Response Regiment, and three CH-47 Chinook helicopters from the 5th Aviation Regiment. The commandos formed the "quick reaction" element for the task group. The SFTG operated in western Iraq where it was successful in securing its area of operations, including the huge Al Asad Air Base. After the invasion was complete, the 40-man commando element provided security to humanitarian assistance missions and other security operations, later providing close protection for Australian officials in Baghdad as part of Operation Catalyst. In 2004, claims appeared in the media that Australian special forces were involved in counter-insurgency operations inside Iraq, although this was denied by the government. The last commando element was withdrawn in 2006.

=== Timor Leste ===
Later, in May 2006 Alpha commando company was deployed to Timor Leste as part of Operation Astute, after relations between the East Timorese government and military forces broke down. The commandos operated alongside the SASR as part of the Special Forces Component and were tasked with advanced force operations in preparation for the arrival of follow-on forces, focusing on Dili Airport. In March 2007, the commandos, along with elements of the SASR, took part in the Battle of Same during which five rebels were killed during an unsuccessful attempt to apprehend the rebel leader, Alfredo Reinado. After the battle, the commandos and SASR elements were withdrawn at the request of the East Timorese government in order to start negotiations with the rebels.

=== Afghanistan ===
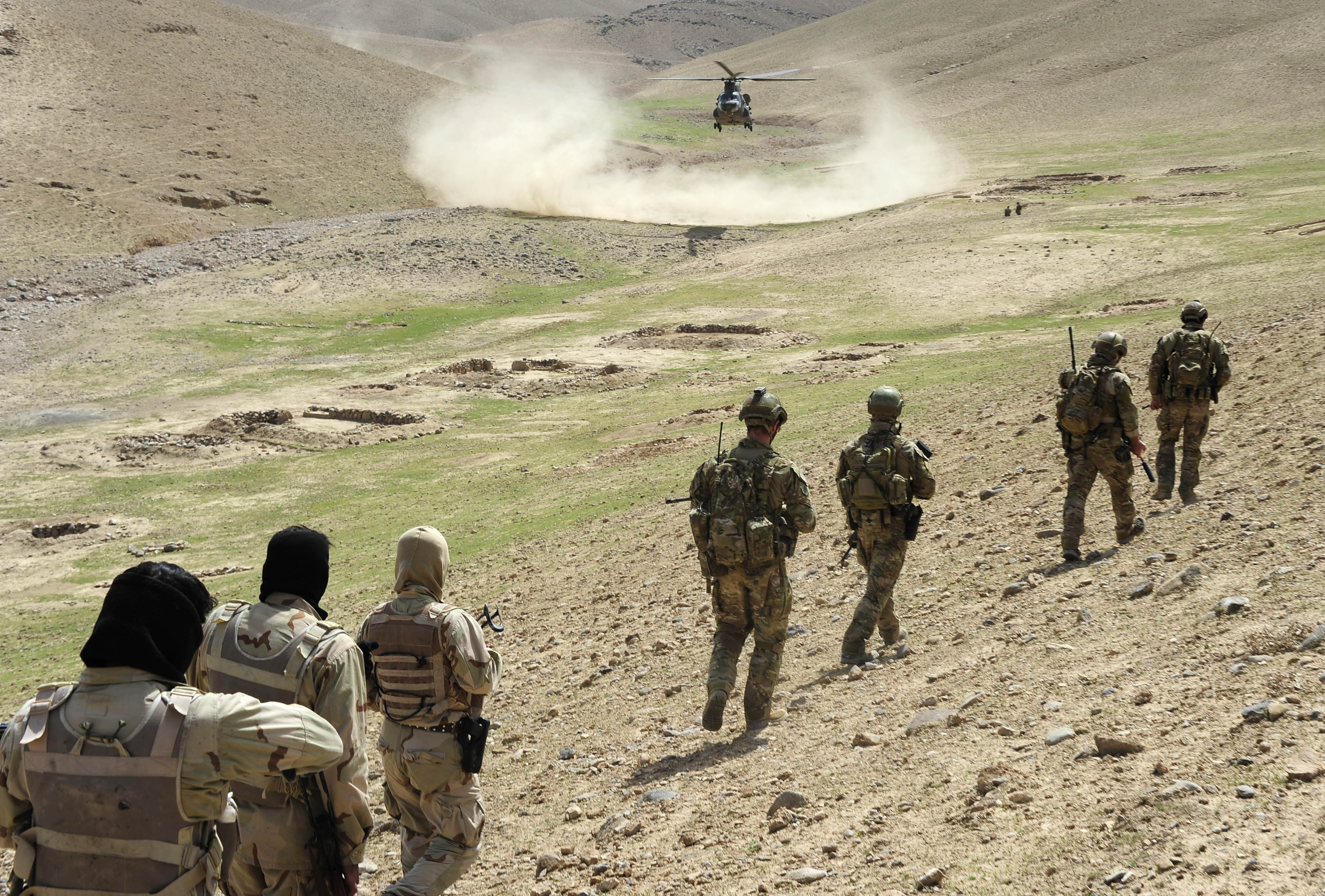
Commandos walking with Afghan National Army to a waiting U.S. Army Chinook helicopter in 2012

Meanwhile, in August 2005 an Australian Special Forces Task Group (SFTG) was deployed to Afghanistan as part of Operation Slipper, operating in the southern province of Uruzgan. The SFTG, based on similar structure deployed during Operation Falconer, was made up of elements from the SASR, Alpha commando company and a troop from the Incident Response Regiment. Two CH-47 Chinook helicopters from the 5th Aviation Regiment were deployed to Afghanistan in March 2006 to support the SFTG. A forward operating base was subsequently established at Tarin Kowt. During this deployment the Commandos were involved in Operation Perth which resulted in the death of over 150 Taliban and al-Qaeda fighters in nine days of fierce fighting in the Chora district of Uruzgan Province. The SFTG was withdrawn from Afghanistan in September 2006 and replaced by a Reconstruction Taskforce made up of engineers and conventional infantry. During this period the task group was on patrol for 306 days and involved in 139 contacts and sustained 11 soldiers wounded.

A 300-strong Special Operations Task Group (SOTG) was subsequently deployed to support the Reconstruction Taskforce in April 2007, including a commando company group, elements of the SASR, and an integral combat service support team. In the latter part of 2008 the commando company conducted a disruption operation in Helmand province as part of Operation Eagle's Summit, which was a major coalition operation conducted in support of the transport and installation of an additional turbine for the Kajaki Dam hydroelectric facility. In March and April 2009, SOTG killed 80 Taliban fighters in a major four-week operation in Helmand Province, without suffering any casualties. Further operations undertaken include the Battle of Gizab in April 2010, and the Shah Wali Kot Offensive in June 2010, which resulted in heavy insurgent casualties. The bulk of SOTG was withdrawn from Afghanistan in late 2013 as part of a drawdown of Australian forces, although some special forces remained after this date as part of the small Australian force maintained in the country. Charlie commando company was the last commando company to serve in Afghanistan and withdrew on 15 December 2013. The regiment lost 12 personnel killed while deployed to Afghanistan, along with one killed during a pre-deployment exercise.

The regiment served in 20 SOTG rotations in Afghanistan, the deployments ranging from about four to six, seven, and eight months. For its actions, the regiment was collectively awarded the Unit Citation for Gallantry and the Meritorious Unit Citation. On 26 March 2013, it was announced that Special Operations Command would receive the first battle honour awarded to an Australian Army unit for actions since the end of the Vietnam War for its performance during the Shah Wali Kot Offensive in Afghanistan from May to June 2010. The battle honour, titled "Eastern Shah Wali Kot", was awarded in recognition of the operational actions of the SASR and 2nd Commando Regiment from Australian Special Operations Task Group Rotation XII. Some of the regiment's personnel have also received individual decorations for their actions in Afghanistan. A posthumous Victoria Cross for Australia was awarded to Cameron Baird for actions in Uruzgan Province in June 2013. As of October 2010, six Distinguished Service Crosses, eleven Distinguished Service Medals, seven Medals for Gallantry and three Stars of Gallantry had been awarded to 2nd Commando Regiment personnel for service in Afghanistan.

In September 2019, The Age reported that a commando from the regiment's November platoon had confessed to the Brereton inquiry of unlawfully killing a prisoner in Afghanistan in October 2012. In September 2022, 7.30 reported that a commando was under investigation by the Office of the Special Investigator in relation to a raid in Afghanistan in October 2012.

=== Military intervention against ISIL ===
In September 2014, as part of Operation Okra the Australian Army deployed a Special Operations Task Group (SOTG) of approximately 200 personnel to the United Arab Emirates in preparation for operations to assist and advise Iraqi Security Forces following an offensive by Islamic State forces. The soldiers were expected to be deployed to Iraq when a legal framework covering their presence in the country was agreed between the Australian and Iraqi Governments. The majority of the SOTG was reported to be made up of C Company, 2nd Commando Regiment, under the command of Ian Langford. It began moving into Iraq in early November. The regiment was tasked with training the Iraq government's Counter Terrorism Service. Personnel from SOTG have also been involved in co-ordinating airstrikes remotely to assist Iraqi forces engaged in clearance operations. From September 2015, the strength of SOTG rotations were reduced to approximately 80 personnel.

== Organisation ==
The regiment consists of a headquarters, four sabre squadrons, logistics support squadron, an operational support squadron and a signals squadron. It is believed to currently be organised as follows:

- Regimental Headquarters
  - A Squadron
  - B Squadron
  - C Squadron
  - D Squadron
  - 126 Signal Squadron
  - Operations Support Squadron
  - Logistics Support Squadron

Incorporates the role of Tactical Assault Group (East) (on rotation).

In 2026, it was reported that the regiment had changed the names of its four companies to squadrons and the platoon names to troops.

== Uniform and equipment ==
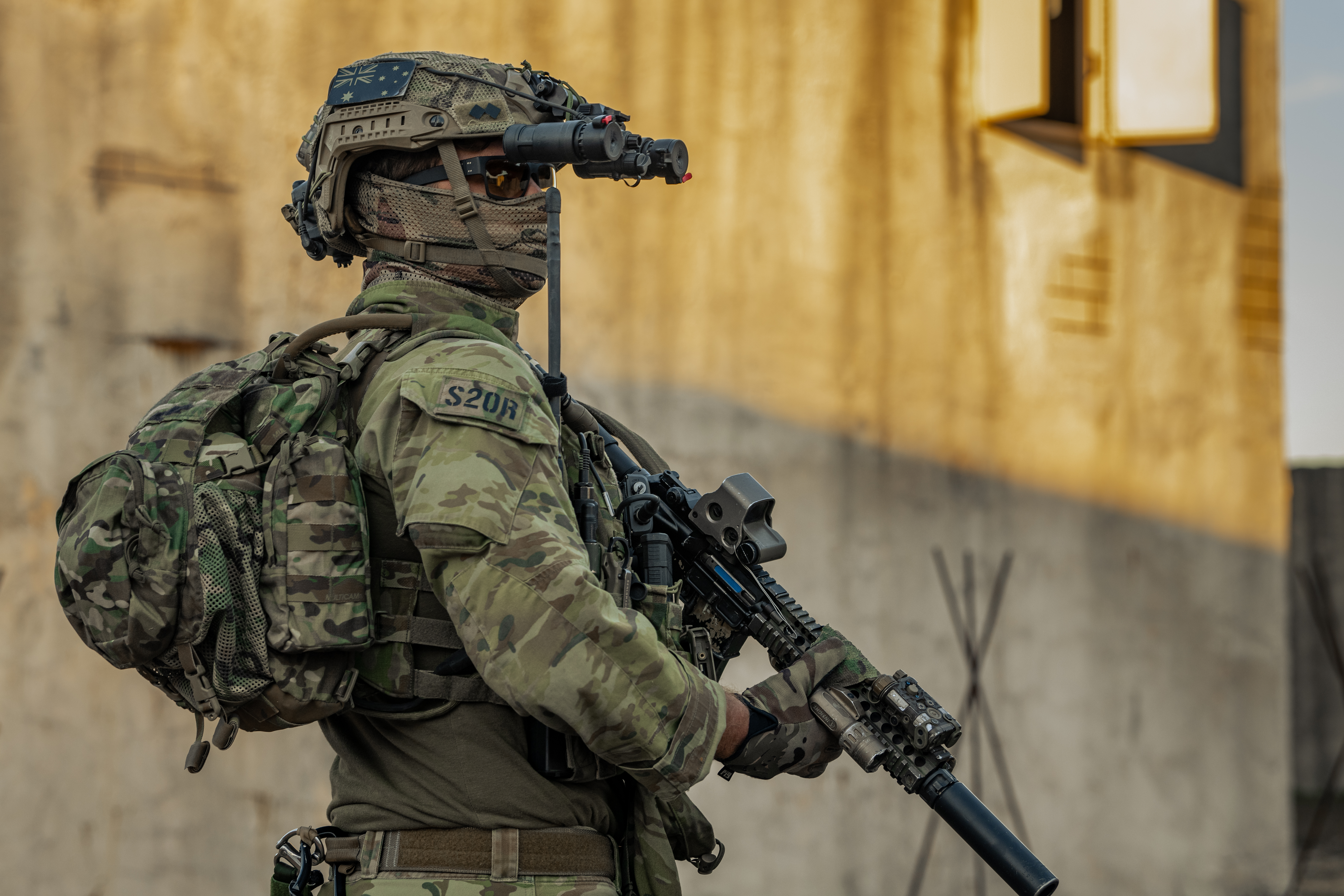
A commando during an exercise in 2023

Following the renaming of the unit, a new badge was chosen to reflect the history and traditions of the Independent Companies that served during the Second World War, by including the distinctive "double diamond" unit colour patch shape in the regimental badge, along with the traditional commando knife. The unit's motto is Foras Admonitio, which is Latin for "Without Warning". Qualified commandos are awarded the Sherwood green commando beret. Distinctive commando parachute wings are worn, depicting a parachute backed by a pair of black drooping wings on a green background. The Australian Army stiletto dagger is also worn on ceremonial occasions. A garter blue lanyard is worn.

Several weapons systems are used, including the M4A5, HK417 and KAC SR-25. Sidearms include the Browning Hi-Power and HK USP Tactical. The HK MP5 submachine gun has been replaced by the SIG MCX Rattler short-barreled rifle chambered in .300 Blackout. Sniper rifles include the Blaser Tactical 2, Accuracy International AW50F and Barrett M82A1. Support weapons include both the FN Minimi Para and FN Maximi, as well as the FN MAG58. Direct and indirect fire support weapons used include 66 mm M72 LAWs, 84 mm M3 MAAWS, FGM-148 Javelins, M2-QCB Browning .50 BMG machine guns, Mk 47 Striker grenade launchers, and 81 mm mortars. Vehicles include the Supacat designed High Mobility Transporter – Extenda (HMT-E) previously named the Special Operations Vehicle – Commando (SOV-Cdo). The HMT-E based on the MK2 Extenda can be re-configured in four configurations. The Australian produced Bale Defence Rough Terrain Vehicle (RTV 2) based on a Can-Am Commander. An undisclosed number of Polaris DAGOR vehicles worth A$22 million were ordered in September 2024. Watercraft operated include the Zodiac F470 inflatable boat and United States Marine, Inc. 11m Air Drop Rigid Hull Inflatable Boat (ADRHIB).

== Selection and training ==
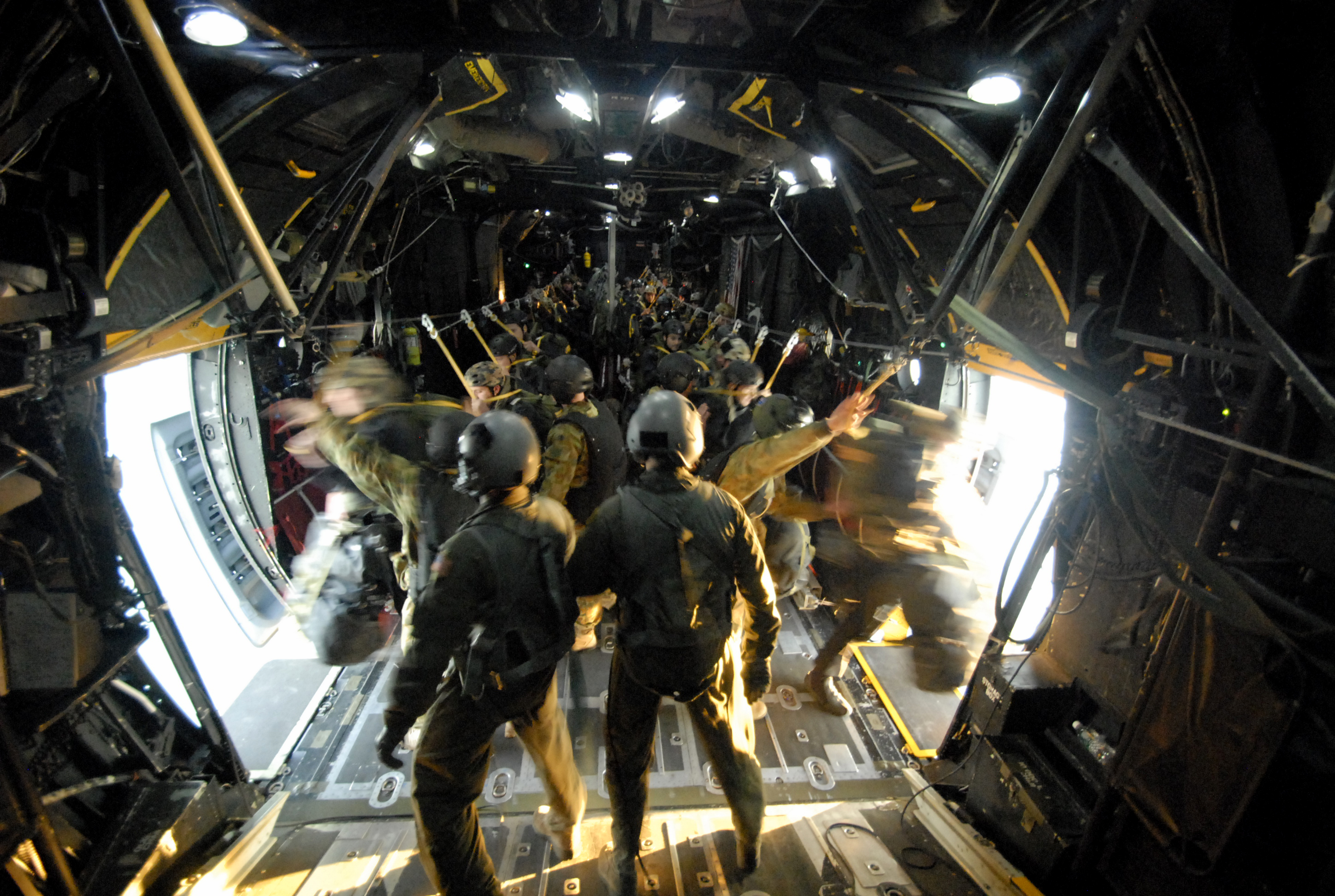
Commandos jump into Shoalwater Bay from a U.S. Air Force MC-130 transport during Exercise Talisman Saber 2011

Any member of the Australian Defence Force (ADF) may apply for entry into the 2nd Commando Regiment. Candidates may also be accepted via the Special Forces Direct Recruitment Scheme (SFDRS), where selected and screened civilians after completing Army Recruit Training and Infantry Initial Employment Training, are able to apply. Certain serving ADF candidates and all SFDRS candidates undertake an eight-week Special Forces Selection Preparation Course, and then all candidates are required to complete the Commando Physical Training Package.

A Review of Special Operations Command in June 2020 by David Irvine recommended that SOCOMD introduce a joint selection course conducted by the Defence Special Operations Training and Education Centre for the regiment and the SASR rather than the units conduct their own individual selection courses. SOCOMD conducted the first common selection course in May 2023. Previously candidates had to successfully complete the Special Forces Entry Test (SFET) followed by a three-week Commando Selection Course. Now candidates after completing the SFET have to successfully complete two common selection modules over ten and eleven days respectively. Successful candidates then commence the 12-month Commando Initial Employment Training, also known as the "Reinforcement Cycle". Upon successful completion of all courses commandos are posted into one of the commando companies where further specialist training occurs. If a candidate fails any part of the selection course they will be returned to their unit, or transferred to one of the infantry battalions of the Royal Australian Regiment if they are a SFDRS candidate. Counter terrorist training is conducted at the Special Forces Training Facility (SFTF) based at Holsworthy Barracks with an indoor range complex, aircraft mock-up, method of entry facility, urban training facility and sniper range. In 2013, a four-hour documentary Commando was produced on the selection course and reinforcement training.
