= Campbell Barracks (Western Australia) =

Military establishment in Perth, Western Australia

- Swanbourne, Western Australia
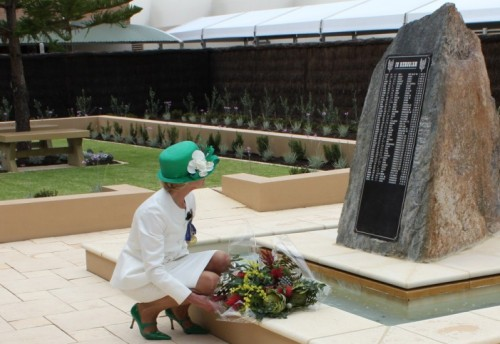
- Governor General Quentin Bryce laying a wreath at Campbell Barracks in 2011

Site information
- Type: Military Base
- Controlled by: Australian Army

Location
- Location of Campbell Barracks in Perth, Western Australia
- Coordinates: 31.971744°S 115.762836°E

Site history
- Built: 1935; 91 years ago
- In use: 1957–present

Garrison information
- Garrison: Special Air Service Regiment

Campbell Barracks is an Australian Army base located in Swanbourne, a coastal suburb of Perth, Western Australia. It is named after Lieutenant Colonel J. A. Campbell (1842–1924), former commandant of the Commonwealth Military Forces in Western Australia.

== History ==
Campbell Barracks was originally acquired in 1935, to house coastal artillery, two six-inch guns. It was to host the northernmost part of Fremantle Fortress, the Fremantle coastal defences. Improvement work was carried out under the supervision of No. 6 Heavy Battery, Royal Australian Artillery. During the Second World War it hosted both artillery and garrison infantry, and the surviving officers from Kormoran were interrogated there after their mutually destructive battle with HMAS Sydney on 19 November 1941, "housed in tents in a wired off area on the grass outside the barracks", until they were moved to Victoria.

The Special Air Service Regiment (SASR) has been based at Campbell Barracks since the regiment was first established as an independent company in 1957. Although Campbell Barracks is the home of the SASR, most of the training and selection for the regiment takes place in Bindoon, Western Australia.

The SASR is a special forces regiment of the Australian Army and is modelled on the original British SAS, while also drawing on the traditions of the Australian Z Special Force commando unit, and the Independent Companies which were active in the South Pacific during the Second World War.

The SASR's three 'sabre squadrons' rotate between the war/reconnaissance and counterterrorism/recovery roles. Two squadrons are maintained in the war/reconnaissance role with the remaining squadron filling the counterterrorism/recovery role. Rotations occur every 12 months, so each squadron fulfils the counterterrorism/recovery role and configuration every three years. Reports that the squadron filling the counterterrorism role is always designated 1 Squadron are incorrect as that practice ceased in the late 1980s.

All three sabre squadrons are garrisoned at Campbell Barracks save for certain units within each sabre squadron that can be rotated amongst bases within Australia. This usually only occurs with the current Counter Terrorist Squadron.

As stated in ex-SASR soldier Keith Fennell's book "Warrior Training", outside the headquarters for Campbell Barracks is a monument to every Australian SASR soldier who has died on active service with the regiment, be it during training or on deployment. The list currently stands at just over 40 soldiers, the majority having been killed in training accidents.
