= Randwick Barracks =

Military base in Kingsford, New South Wales, Australia

Coordinates: 33.930602°S 151.238688°E

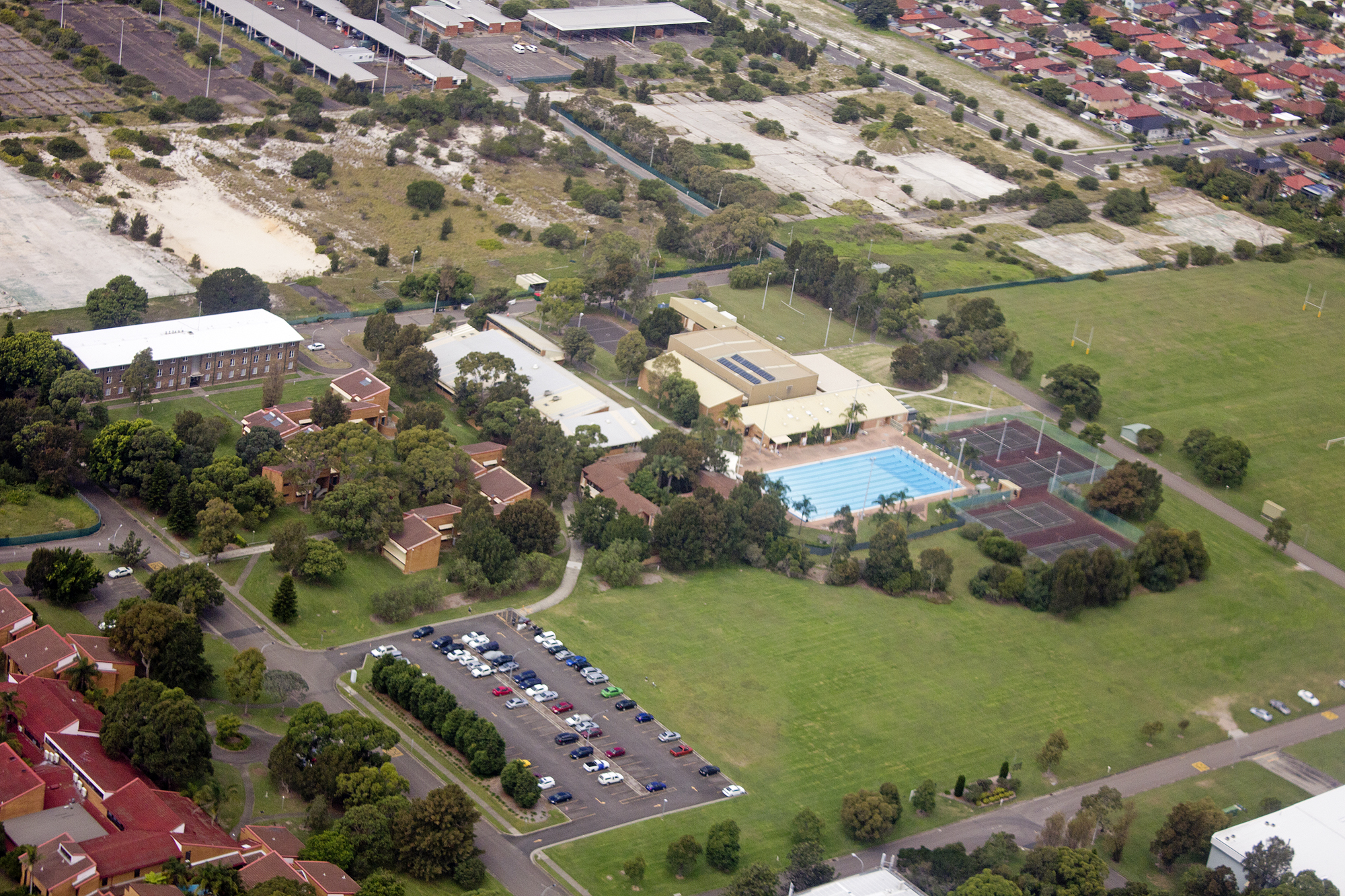
- Randwick Barracks in 2012

Site information
- Type: Military base
- Owner: Department of Defence
- Controlled by: Australian Army
- Open to the public: No
- Condition: Active

Site history
- In use: 1841–present

Garrison information
- Occupants: HQ 2nd Division

Randwick Barracks is a military base in Kingsford, New South Wales, Australia. It is the base for a number of support and Australian Army Reserve units.

== History ==
The Barracks was initially established in 1841 and by the late 19th century, the site evolved into a military training area. From 1891 to the 1920s, it served as the Randwick Rifle Range and School of Musketry, playing a crucial role in the training of Australian troops.

In 1965, the 1st Topographical Survey Troop was formally raised at the site, and a section of this troop accompanied the 1st Australian Task Force to Vietnam in 1966.

In 2010, a portion of the former military land was transferred to Randwick City Council and became the Randwick Environmental Park. This 13-hectare park, which includes bushland and wetland areas, serves as a community space and is home to diverse native flora and fauna. It was originally part of the Randwick Army Barracks and opened to the public in 2010.

== List of units ==
1st Division

- 39th Operational Support Battalion

2nd Division

- Headquarters, 2nd Division
- 8th Signal Regiment (HQ at Randwick Barracks, NSW)

6th Brigade

- 19th Chief Engineer Works

17th Sustainment Brigade

- Headquarters, 17th Sustainment Brigade
- Headquarters, 1st Psychology Unit and 1st Health Support Company (Randwick Barracks, NSW)

1st Commando Regiment (1 Cdo Regt)

- Regimental Headquarters (1 Cdo Regt)
- 301st Signal Squadron (1 Cdo Regt)
