= Australian Defence Force School of Special Operations =

Training unit of the Australian Army

- Active: 1 September 2017 – present
- Country: Australia
- Branch: Australian Army
- Type: Military training
- Role: Special operations training
- Part of: Special Forces Group
- Garrison/HQ: Holsworthy Barracks

The Australian Defence Force School of Special Operations is an Australian Army training unit part of the Defence Special Operations Training and Education Centre (DSOTEC) responsible for the recruitment, selection, training, education and trade management of all Special Operations Command (SOCOMD) personnel. It is based at Holsworthy Barracks, New South Wales. The school was established on 19 November 2019 following the renaming of the newly formed Special Operations Training and Education Centre.

== History ==
The Special Forces Training Centre was established on 1 December 1998 at the Lone Pine Barracks outside Singleton, New South Wales as a unit of the Army Training Command to support, validate and develop special forces training. The role of the SFTC grew significantly to manage a broad range of training and training support tasks on behalf of Special Operations Command.In 2004, the SFTC transferred from Training Command to Special Operations Command.

The SFTC badge featured a Commando knife and a SASR sword overlaying the flame of Gideon, representing the intense heat of the selection process, with a double diamond background representing World War II commando units.

The SFTC was responsible for the delivery of more than 30 courses per year including the conduct of all Special Forces Support Staff Tactical Integration training and the Commando Reinforcement Cycle.

On 1 September 2017, the SFTC was renamed the Special Operations Training and Education Centre (SOTEC). On 19 November 2019, the SOCOMD training units were reorganised with SOTEC renamed as the Australian Defence Force School of Special Operations and placed under the command of the newly raised Defence Special Operations Training and Education Centre (DSOTEC).

== Role ==
The School of Special Operations provides the centralised coordination of the selection and training of personnel of the Special Operations Command. The centre is planned to be fully operational by January 2021 and will include a new detachment in Perth.

The school is to be founded on four pillars of excellence, being:

- Martial and force projection skills.
- Political/strategic/foreign relations acumen.
- Military and operational excellence.
- Ethical, cultural, social and emotional intelligence acumen.

=== Special Forces Screen Test ===
Special Forces selection is open to all serving Australian Defence Force personnel and candidates must complete the Special Forces Screen Test. The Special Forces Screen Test assesses physical fitness, teamwork, mental skills and includes an interview.

=== Australian Special Operations Course ===
The first Australian Special Operations Course (ASOC) was conducted in early 2017. The 12 day course is open to all Australian Defence Force personnel and personnel from other Australian Government agencies to provide an insight into special operations with the first phase theory based and the second phase practical based.
