= Special Operations Engineer Regiment (Australia) =

Specialised unit of the Australian Army

- Cap badge of the Special Operations Engineer Regiment
- Active: May 2002 – present
- Country: Australia
- Branch: Australian Army
- Type: Special forces
- Role: Special operations support CBRN defense Counter-terrorism
- Part of: Special Forces Group
- Garrison/HQ: Holsworthy Barracks, New South Wales, Australia
- Mottos: Inter Hastas Et Hostes ("Between Spears and Enemies")
- Engagements: Iraq War; War in Afghanistan • Operation Slipper

Insignia
- Unit colour patch
- Abbreviation: SOER

The Special Operations Engineer Regiment (SOER) is a specialised unit of the Australian Army. The regiment forms part of the Special Operations Command. The unit was formed in 2002 as the Incident Response Regiment (IRR), they are deployed to respond to chemical, biological, radiological, nuclear or explosive incidents. The regiment was transferred into the newly raised Special Operations Command in 2003. In 2010 and 2011, its role changed to supporting the army's special forces units, and it was renamed accordingly.

== History ==
The Special Operations Engineer Regiment (SOER) can trace its history to a number of specialist Royal Australian Engineers organisations. The Emergency Response Squadron was initially formed in 1999 from the existing Army Fire Service in response to the 1996 Blackhawk Helicopter disaster in the Townsville High Range training area. The Chemical, Biological and Radiological Response (CBRR) Squadron was formed in 1999 by expanding the existing Chemical Radiological Response Team.

In 1999, the Joint Incident Response Unit (JIRU) was established as part of the Australian Defence Force's security arrangements for the 2000 Sydney Olympic Games. The JIRU incorporated the CBRR Squadron, an EOD Squadron and a Technical / High Risk Search Squadron. JIRU was part of Joint Task Force Gold. When the JIRU was disbanded in March 2001 the CBRR Squadron was retained as an independent squadron.

Following the 11 September terrorist attacks the Australian Government directed Defence to re-establish a JIRU. This was achieved by establishing a new Incident Response Regimental HQ to command the CBRR Squadron and the Emergency Response Squadron (ERS), though this sub-unit was disbanded in 2006. The IRU was redesignated to form the Incident Response Regiment in May 2002. A specialist Scientific and Technical Support Organisation staffed by civilian and military scientists was also formed and attached to the IRR.

On 24 February 2012, the IRR was disbanded and re-raised as the SOER. The reason for this change was to provide a more accurate name for the regiment's current role. The primary role of the regiment is no longer to respond to crisis management, but rather to provide counter-Chemical, Biological, Radiological, Nuclear or Explosive (C-CBRNE) and Mobility and Survivability capabilities to Special Operations.

Like that of the IRR, teams of SOER personnel are integrated into the Australian Army's tactical assault groups to maintain Australia's Domestic Counter Terrorism capabilities, whilst still supporting Special Operations in Afghanistan. The regiment once included an aviation emergency response capability in of support Special Operations Command. However, this has since been transferred to the 16th Aviation Regiment.

Elements of the IRR deployed on combat in Iraq and Afghanistan as part of Operation Slipper in support of the Special Operations Task Force. Later, as the SOER, elements of the unit also deployed on combat operations in Afghanistan and partner capacity building operations in Iraq.

The Special Operations Engineer Regiment is composed of A and B Squadrons and a Logistic Support Group, based at Holsworthy Barracks, approximately 25 km (16 mi) south-west of Sydney, New South Wales.

== See also ==
- Canadian Joint Incident Response Unit
- 28 Engineer Regiment
