= Specialist Response and Security =

Specialist Response and Security Team
- Active: 1978–2012
- Country: Australia
- Branch: Australian Federal Police
- Role: Law Enforcement, Domestic Counter-Terrorism and Tactical Law Enforcement
- Size: 36 full-time Officers
- Part of: Australian Federal Police
- Garrison/HQ: Canberra City ACT
- Nickname: SRS
- Engagements: Pong Su incident 2003 Canberra bushfires Operation Linnet; 1993 Jolimont Centre siege

Commanders
- Current commander: Detective Superintendent Rob Gilliland

Until July 2012 the Specialist Response and Security Team (SRS) was a Police Tactical Group of the Australian Federal Police (AFP) having responsibility for tactical and specialist operations within the Australian Capital Territory. The Operational Response Group (ORG) had responsibility for AFP National and International tactical operations. In July 2012 the SRS was merged with the ORG to create the Specialist Response Group.

== History ==
The SRS formed part of the Australian Government's National Anti-Terrorism Plan which required each State/Territory Police Force to maintain a specialist counter-terrorist and hostage rescue unit with specialist capabilities. The SRS fulfilled that role within the Australian Capital Territory, until the formation of the SRG.

In 1964 the AFP created the "Armed Offenders Squad" after officers attended a New South Wales Police Force "Emergency Squad" training course. This unit was under the control of Detectives and worked on a part-time as needed basis. As a result of SACPAV recommendations after the 1978 Sydney Hilton bombing several members of the Army's elite Special Air Service Regiment (SASR) were employed as Commonwealth Police in order to create the "Commonwealth Police Counter Terrorist Operations Section" which was dissolved in 1981 after the CHOGM meeting held in Melbourne. In 1983, the "Special Operations Team" (SOT) was formed. In 2002, following 9/11 the SOT underwent significant changes. In March 2003, the SOT was renamed to the Specialist Response and Security section.

In October 1998, the SOT participated in Operation Linnet, a land and sea operation off Port Macquarie that resulted in the seizure of 390 kg of heroin. The SOT boarded the Belize-registered freighter Uniana suspected of smuggling the heroin to Australia from south-east Asia.

Specialist Response and Security (SRS) section of ACT Policing provided a full-time tactical operations unit who also performed search and rescue and riot control duties, a K9 role and bomb squad. The unit also commanded the AFP's Police Negotiation Team, Water Police, Police Divers and Major Events Planning Team. In 2011 SRS took delivery of Lenco BearCat armoured rescue vehicle for high risk tactical operations.

== Role ==
SRS officers undertook the following duties within the ACT:

- Resolving siege and hostage situations, as well as armed offender situations;
- Providing a negotiation service in high risk and critical situations;
- Undertaking searches of premises in high risk situations;
- The arrest of armed and dangerous offenders;
- Escorting and securing dangerous prisoners in high risk situations;
- Providing support services for major operations;
- Rescue and bomb disposal operations;
- Counter-terrorism and hijacking operations;
- The escort and security of VIPs, internationally protected persons, Heads of State;
- Testing and evaluation of specialist less than lethal weapons/devices;

On occasion, SRS officers also provided support to international AFP deployments overseas prior to the formation of the Operational Response Group [previously known as the Operational Response Team (ORT)].

Their role on such operations included:

- effect high risk searches, search warrants and arrests
- support to public order policing remote rural patrols
- protection of people in high risk situations
- support to the security of members deployed to mission.

== Units ==
The section consisted of a number of units including:

- Water operations team
- Canine (K9) operations team
- Bomb response team
- Tactical Response Team (SRS-TR)

The section also provided close personal protection to important dignitaries and heads of state visiting Australia.

== Unit Closure ==
The SRS merged with Operational Response Group as part of a major restructuring process that was designed to reduce the duplication between specialist AFP and ACT Policing units and national AFP assets into one command and located in Canberra. The Specialist Response Group commenced operations on 1 July 2012.

== See also ==
- Australian Federal Police
- Specialist Response Group
- Operational Response Group
- Australian Capital Territory Police
- Tactical Assault Group
- National Anti Terrorism Exercise
