= Specialist Protective Services =

Unit of the Australian Federal Police

- Active: 1 July 2020 – present
- Country: Australia
- Agency: Australian Federal Police
- Role: Law enforcement; Counter-terrorism; Riot control; Search and Rescue
- Operations jurisdiction: National; International
- Headquarters: Canberra
- Abbreviation: SPS

Structure
- Sworn members: Approx. 200

Notables
- Significant operation(s): Pong Su incident; 2003 Canberra bushfires; 1993 Jolimont Centre siege; Tham Luang cave rescue

The Specialist Protective Services (SPS) is a highly trained police unit of the Australian Federal Police (AFP) consisting of a range of teams capable of deploying at short notice in order to undertake a variety of specialist policing tasks. SPS predominantly consist of sworn police officers, based in Canberra, Australian Capital Territory (ACT), who are capable of resolving high risk planned and emergency policing operations; both domestically and internationally.

The SPS sub-unit the Tactical Response Team (TRT) is a police tactical group. The SPS predecessor, the Specialist Response Group, commenced operations in July 2012 as a result of the merging of the Specialist Response and Security Team (SRS) (from ACT Policing) and the Operational Response Group (ORG) from AFP's International Deployment Group. The SRG became the largest centralised specialist policing capability in Australia, with almost 200 personnel.

In 2020, the AFP conducted a review of their organisational structure and operating model and subsequently established the Specialist Protection Command on 1 July 2020. The AFP reported in a 2019-20 annual report that the SRG had been renamed as Specialist Protective Services.

== History ==
AFP has had charge of local ACT Policing since 1979, and established a full-time tactical unit then known as the Special Operations Team (SOT) replacing the previous part-time group known as the Armed Offenders Squad (AOS). In 2002 SOT was reorganized and renamed as the Specialist Response and Security team (SRS). Initially, SRS had responsibility for ACT Policing only, with it soon became apparent that the wider AFP required tactical operators of their own for both national investigations and International Deployment Group operations.

In April 2005, AFP created what was then known as the Operational Response Team (ORT), a small team of specialist tactical police able to respond and assist AFP officers engaged in the International Deployment Group's response to the Regional Assistance Mission to the Solomon Islands (RAMSI), Solomon Islands.

The ORT was soon expanded to fulfil further AFP domestic and international operations and included new roles (such as public order), and was renamed the Operational Response Group (ORG) in late 2006. As part of the expansion, a forward base was opened in Brisbane, Queensland, and an Aviation Support Unit was opened in Melbourne, Victoria.

AFP conducted reviews (Leahy and Beale reviews) which recommended that SRS and ORG be merged in order to reduce duplication of efforts, and to centralise AFP tactical/specialist resources under a single command in Canberra, in order to improve efficiencies and effectiveness. Both Brisbane and Melbourne ORG offices were re-located to Canberra in preparation for the merger, with the Specialist Response Group becoming operational in Canberra on 1 July 2012. Specialist Response Group was renamed to Specialist Protective Services around 2019 or 2020.

== Role ==
The SPS provides the AFP with highly trained operational specialist teams capable of rapidly deploying either domestically or internationally in order to solve a variety of medium and high-risk planned and emergency incidents. It can deploy and provide critical assistance to regional neighbours in times of crisis, and assist with the restoration of law and order, rapid disaster response assistance, and capacity-building initiatives.

SPS provides resources to three distinct areas namely:

- International Deployment Group operations (supporting AFP's overseas operations including capacity building and regional stability operations).
- AFP National Investigations (across Australia); and
- ACT Policing (supporting community policing in the ACT).

As SPS are significantly larger than each of its predecessors (SRS and ORG), there is increased flexibility for AFP command to provide greater resources to particular operations or incidents while maintaining other core roles and permanent deployments.

The SPS is capable of conducting a variety of operations throughout Australia and overseas including:

- public order management (including restoration of law and order);
- search and rescue;
- disaster response;
- tactical intelligence;
- police negotiation;
- police canine;
- bomb response;
- bomb appraisal;
- water operations;
- tactical operations; and
- capacity building, restoring stability and force protection operations.

SPS provides the only full-time local tactical and public order specialist policing for Australian Capital Territory (i.e. ACT Policing) and SPS can also provide specialist support to other state and territory police jurisdictions when required.

== Organisation and structure ==
Although a sub-unit of AFP's International Deployment Group, SPS report to a committee consisting of both IDG and ACT Policing executive. Although all SPS operators are sworn police officers, there are a number of unsworn support and training personnel within the organisation who play critical roles.

The primary operational components of SPS are Specialist Response, Tactical Response and Targeted Operations, and they are supported by Specialist Policing Command and Coordination.

=== Specialist response ===
- Police Negotiators (PNT or 'Negs') aim to achieve non-violent resolution to life-threatening situations through effective crisis communications. The team supports SPS operations domestically and can respond to international incidents when negotiator skills are required.
- Tactical Intelligence (TI) engage in the collection, collation, analysis, production and dissemination of intelligence product in support of SPS.
- Tactical Canine (Dog) provide a general purpose police canine response which can be utilised for tasks including search for offenders, missing persons and physical evidence. They also support crowd control and critical incident operations. An intensive selection and training course is conducted for handlers.
- Bomb Response Team (BRT) coordinate all bomb response capabilities and is a Bomb Response capability under the Australian New Zealand, Counter Terrorism Committee (ANZCTC) arrangements. The BRT consists of both full-time Bomb Response Technicians and Bomb Appraisal Officers (BAO). BRT respond to a range of explosive oriented tasks including render safe, explosive search, appraisal and explosive recovery operations wherever required throughout Australia or overseas. BRT are able to resolve chemical, biological and radiological incidents where explosive threat is present. BRT facilitates and manages the national AFP BAO capability including training and assessment (primarily for aviation portfolio) and Bomb Search Team training (primarily for ACT Policing).
- Communications Response (CR) members provide tactical communication support to SRG teams in a variety of environments.
- Maritime members provide specialist water and dive capabilities in support of AFP national and international operations, including evidence search, body search and recovery, and search and rescue. Maritime are equipped to provide swift water rescue, tactical boarding and proactive patrolling in support of ACT Policing and the broader AFP.
- Air Support (AS) members operate aviation based equipment in support of SPS operations in Australia and overseas. They provide aerial platform for overwatch and observation, and utilise Forward Looking Infrared (FLIR) technology integrated with a LogiMap moving map system. AS can insert and extract operators into Areas of Operation via various means including fast-roping, abseiling (rappelling), casting and winching. The team also delivers airborne skills maintenance training across SPS teams.
- Extended Capabilities (EC) consist of operators who provide national coordination and standardisation of part-time and embedded specialist capabilities, including regional Specialist Support Teams, Operational Support Group (ACT Policing), Public Order Management, Search and Rescue and SPS Medics program. EC assist these capabilities through application of national consistency of operating procedures, training, uniform and equipment, enabling members to provide effective support to a range of local, national and international AFP policing operations.

=== Tactical Response Team ===
The TRT conducts high risk operations and responds to emergency incidents. The TRT is capable of operating in urban, rural and waterborne environments, and is defined as a police tactical group within the Australian and New Zealand Counter-Terrorism Committee (ANZCTC) arrangements. TRT skill sets include close quarter tactics, advanced dynamic breaching techniques, active shooter, high-risk vehicle intercept, roping, rural operations, marine operations, marksman, medic and riot control.

In 2022, the TRT deployed to 135 incidents and operations throughout the country and overseas. TRT operators are chosen after a 14-month training and selection process.

=== Specialist policing command and coordination ===
- SPS Command, Coordination and Planning undertake command support and planning services for SPS.
- Training Team operators facilitate SPS selection courses and TR and TO Operator basic courses. They maintain and develop contemporary firearms and tactical skills providing ongoing specialist training for operators. The training Team also have fitness experts who assist in maintaining SPS members' health and fitness.
- Logistics members provide logistical and stores support to all SPS teams operating locally, nationally and internationally.

== Operations ==
A variety of domestic (AFP National Operations) and international (Asia-Pacific region) deployments were made by the predecessor organisation, Operational Response Group. SPS still maintains a permanent presence based in Honiara, Solomon Islands as part of the Regional Assistance Mission to the Solomon Islands (RAMSI). The other predecessor organisation Specialist Response and Security team undertook a range of operations supporting ACT Policing (community policing), in addition to some national operations and support to RAMSI.

Then SRG Divers took part in the 2018 Tham Luang cave rescue in Thailand working with the Royal Thai Navy and international responders.

== Police medic capability ==
All SPS operators are required to maintain advanced first-aid skills. However, because TR, MR and TO operators often operate in remote and isolated operational environments within Australia and overseas, selected operators are crossed trained as Police Medics.

SPS medic training necessitates successful completion of a variety of course modules including basic and advanced life support, trauma care, emergency medication administration, medical evacuation and extended care in remote and austere environments.

== Recruitment and training ==
Potential operators must have a minimum of two years of contemporary sworn policing experience before undertaking a series of psychological, psychometric and physical fitness testing. Applicants must also complete an integrity assessment, security clearance, panel interview and a medical examination. Once barrier gateways are met, potential members undertake a physically demanding and arduous TR or TO selection course. On successful completion of the relevant selection course and receiving a recommendation, potential operators are then able to commence either the TR or TO basic (operator) course. On successful completion of either the TR or TO basic course, trainees are then admitted into SRG.

Other SPS areas such as BRT and police divers have separate selection, assessment and training courses.

== Equipment ==
SPS does not publicise information on weapon platforms or other equipment utilised by their operators, but they are known to utilise a wide variety of specialist weapons and munitions. The AFP utilises variants of the Glock pistol and are known to use the Heckler & Koch G36 5.56mm rifle.

SPS use less lethal (extended range impact and chemical) weapons and munitions such as the Bean bag round. AFP Tactical operators have used the Taser conducted energy weapon since 2004.

SPS uses an armoured police rescue vehicle (Lenco BearCat) for particular police operations.

In undertaking bomb tasks, SPS's BRT use a number of robotic platforms, an explosives containment chamber and two types of explosive ordnance disposal (EOD) suits.

== See also ==
- National Anti Terrorism Exercise
- Australian Defence Force – Tactical Assault Group
- New Zealand Police - Special Tactics Group
