= State Protection Group =

Unit of the New South Wales Police Force

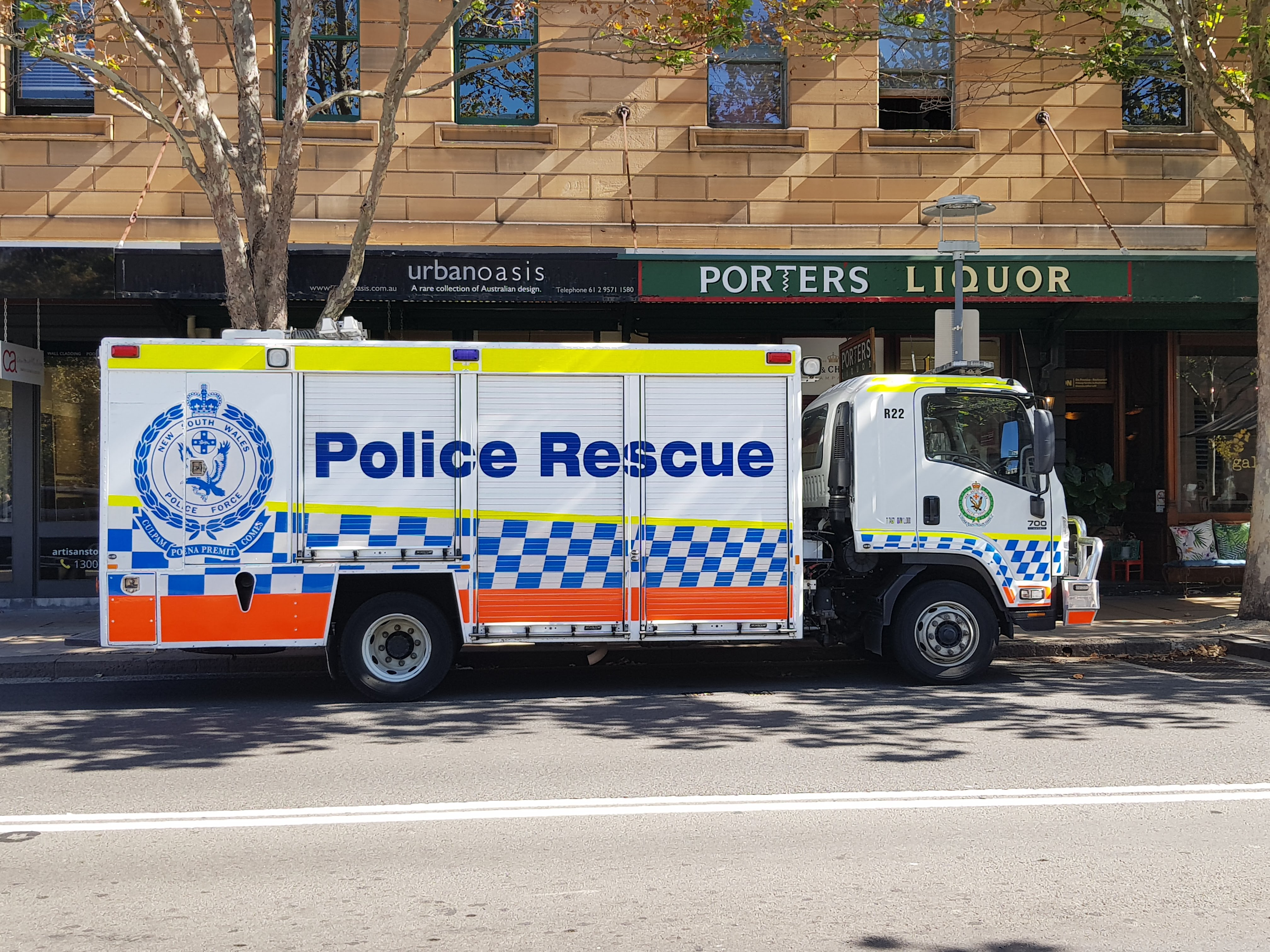
- Rescue and bomb disposal unit van
- Active: 19 June 1991 – present
- Country: Australia
- Agency: New South Wales Police Force
- Role: Law enforcement Counter Terrorism
- Part of: Counter Terrorism & Special Tactics Command
- Headquarters: Sydney
- Motto: Stamus Una; We Stand As One
- Abbreviation: SPG

Notables
- Significant operation(s): 1993 Cangai siege; 1994 Ivan Milat arrest; 1997 Thredbo landslide; 2000 Sydney Olympics; 2003 Rugby World Cup; APEC Australia 2007; World Youth Day 2008; 2009 arrest of Anthony 'Badness' Perish; 2011 Parramatta legal chambers hostage rescue; 2012 arrest of Malcolm Naden; 2014 Sydney hostage crisis

The State Protection Group (SPG) is part of the Counter Terrorism & Special Tactics Command of the New South Wales Police Force and was established in 1991 to deal with extraordinary policing responses. The SPG directly supports police in high-risk incidents such as sieges with specialised tactical, negotiation, intelligence and command-support services. The unit also provides rescue and bomb disposal support, canine policing, and armoury services.

== History ==
Established in June 1991, the State Protection Group replaced four former specialist units; the Special Weapons and Operations Section (SWOS), the Witness Security Unit, regional Tactical Response Groups and the Police Rescue Squad. Later other sections were added to the command including the Police Armoury, Negotiation Section, Bomb Disposal and Dog Unit. In recent years the Witness Security Unit was moved from the State Protection Group to the Anti Terrorism & Security Group.

== Roles ==
- Resolving siege and hostage situations, as well as armed offender situations;
- Providing a negotiation service in high risk and critical situations;
- Undertaking searches of premises in high risk situations;
- The arrest of armed and dangerous offenders;
- Escorting and securing dangerous prisoners in high risk situations;
- Providing support services for major operations;
- Rescue and bomb disposal operations;
- Counter-terrorism and hijacking operations;
- The escort and security of VIPs, internationally protected persons, Heads of State; and
- Providing specialist engineering services and supply of ammunition and firearms for the NSW Police Force through the Armoury.

== Mission ==
"To provide extraordinary services to operational police in rescue, bomb disposal, high risk resolution, negotiation, specialised dog unit and Armoury services."

== Organisation ==
The SPG currently consists of the following sections:

- Tactical Operations Unit (TOU)
- Tactical Operations Regional Support (TORS)
- Negotiation Unit
- Intelligence Unit
- Police Rescue and Bomb Disposal Unit
- Dog Unit

=== Tactical Operations Unit (TOU) ===
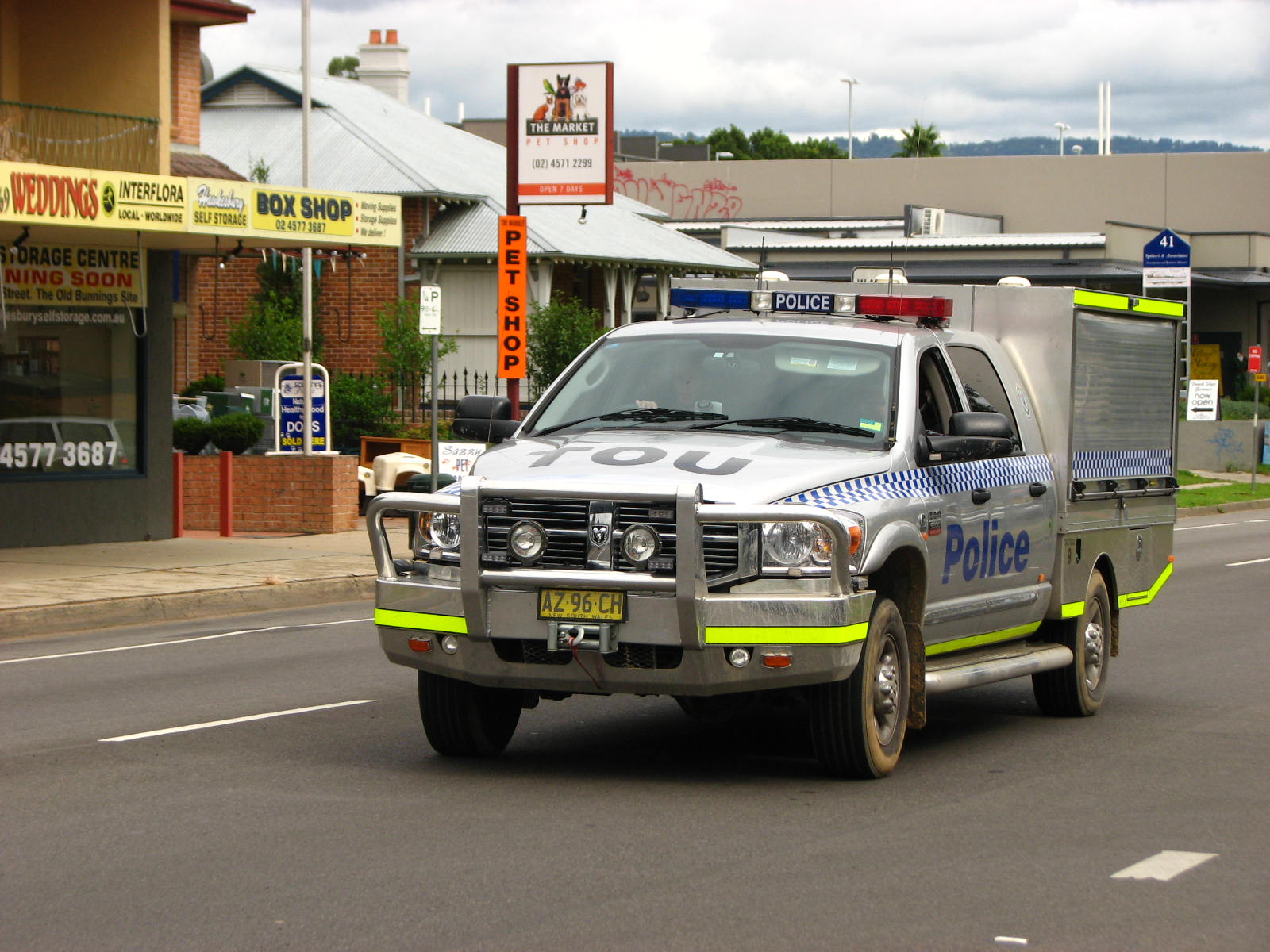
Tactical Operations Unit Dodge Ram "Emergency Response Vehicle" (ERV).

Since 1978, the Australian Government's National Counter-Terrorism Plan has required each state police force to maintain a specialist counter-terrorist and hostage-rescue unit known as a police tactical group The unit that now fulfills that role is the Tactical Operations Unit. The Unit has undergone a number of changes over the years.

Since 1945 the New South Wales Police Force has maintained a team of tactical police available for specialist operations with the creation of the 'Riot Squad' which consisted of a number detectives from '21 Division' to counter the number of armed hold ups that occurred after World War II. Over the following years it became known as the 'Emergency Squad' In 1977 the squad had its name changed to the 'Special Weapons and Operations Section' (SWOS) with its size and role expanding, including a full-time complement of 27 officers and 400 part-time officers across the State.

In 1980 the Tactical Response Group (TRG) was created, becoming operational in May 1982. The units were divided into groups of 25 officers across the four metropolitan regions with a primary role of responding to riots, demonstrations, disasters, saturation patrols and to support SWOS at barricaded hostage and siege situations. TRG officers were mainly drawn from the ranks of general duties police whereas SWOS were drawn from Detectives sections and branches.

In June 1991 both units were rationalised and dissolved with the creation of the Tactical Operations Unit. The Unit's aim is the resolution of high-risk incidents by containment and negotiation. Minimal or judicious use of force is to be applied only as a last resort and based on full and careful assessment. Unlike the former SWOS and TRG, the TOU is a completely full-time assignment with a strength of 75 operators and is not responsible for riot control or crowd control situations, which are handled by the Public Order and Riot Squad (PORS). The TOU is available to provide extraordinary assistance to operational police in high-risk incidents such as resolving siege and hostage situations, as well as armed offender situations across the State on a 24-hour basis. The TOU conducts 'high risk' arrest operations of armed and dangerous offenders such as Ivan Milat, Malcolm Naden, or those involved in firearm incidents such as bikie related shootings. The TOU deals with at least 200 "high-risk" situations, including siege and hostage scenarios, each year across NSW.

The TOU is equipped with 'less-lethal' devices as well as specialist firearms and equipment for 'domestic' and counter-terrorist operations. Members of the TOU are equipped with a wide range of specialist firearms including tactical shotguns for less lethal options and breaching. TOU respond in unmarked units including 4WDS and utes, BMW X5, motorcycles and Chrysler SRT 300 and BMW sedans for pursuit. The TOU is equipped with a wide range of specialist vehicles including mobile command and support vehicles and armoured Chevrolet vans. In March 2025, the TOU acquired two new armoured Lenco BearCats which are based on Ford F550s, including one equipped, in an Australian first, with an extendable ramp that will be based in Sydney. At the time, a total of five new BearCats were purchased for A$3.5 million bringing the total number of BearCats in the New South Wales Police Force fleet to six.

As stated earlier the Tactical Operations Unit does have a wider range of firearms and tactical equipment to choose from. The accessories are Aimpoint Micro T2 holographic sights, L3 AN/PEQ-16 laser/light module and fore-grips.

The standard sidearm is the Glock 22 .40 S&W pistol usually carried in a Safariland 6280 Holster that can accept the Glock with a tactical light attached. The assault rifle used is the SIG MCX chambered in .300 AAC Blackout replacing the previously issued Colt M4 Carbine chambered in 5.56×45mm. Rifles are fitted with optical sights, fore-grip, flashlights, laser sights and an adjustable stock. Carbines fitted with optical sights, fore-grips and picatinny rails are utilized by assaulters. Some Officers have been using Mossberg 500(590A1 Tactical) Pump action shotgun as their shotgun choice. Snipers use a variety of rifles and have been seen using the Accuracy International Arctic Warfare Chassis System (AICS) modified and a remake over Remington 700 sniper rifle and Blaser R93 Tactical. Both snipers were Chambered in .308 Winchester, along with the LaRue Tactical OBR 7.62 marksman rifle,

The TOU feature in an in-depth article of 'On Duty' magazine detailing selection criteria and fitness requirements amongst other operational facets. In 2020 TOU featured in volume 12 of international tactical photography magazine "FLASHBANG Magazine".

=== Tactical Operations Regional Support (TORS) ===
New South Wales has maintained a part-time tactical capability across the State under various names over the years. Through the 1960s and 1970s the units were known as Emergency Squads becoming known as Country/Regional SWOS in the late 1970s and early 1980s. With the creation of the Tactical Operations Unit in 1991 and dropping of the name SWOS the units became known as State Protection Support Unit (SPSU).

In 2018, the SPSU was renamed to Tactical Operations Regional Support (TORS).

TORS provides specialist support to the Tactical Operations Unit in resolving high-risk incidents in regional New South Wales. TORS Units across the State are involved in approximately 60 'high risk' operations per year.

Comprising part-time tactical operatives from non-metropolitan areas, TORS consists of police whose primary duties cover a wide range of activities including general duties, highway patrol, detectives and weapons training.

The types of operations that they can be called upon to undertake include containing siege and armed offender situations; resolving siege and hostage situations; arresting armed and dangerous offenders, often in high-risk situations; conducting high-risk searches of premises; escorting and providing security for internationally protected persons, heads of State and holders of high office who are assessed and determined to be at risk. The unit also provides support for high-risk major operations.

Each year TORS is involved in approximately 60 operations across the State which includes pre-planned operations and the execution of high-risk search warrants. While primarily a regional resource, TORS can be deployed throughout the State to assist the Tactical Operations Unit.

Approximately 170 TORS officers are on call across the state under regional command. In 2025, four new BearCat armoured vehicles were based across the state including northern, western and southern areas of the state for use by the TOU and TORS.

The TOU is responsible for the initial selection and training of TORS applicants, followed up by monthly local training and an annual TOU re-certification camp. TORS officers also attend different training camps organised by Tactical Operations Unit to maintain their training levels.

TORS teams are equipped with a range of specialist tactical gear including less than lethal munitions such as Tasers, beanbags as well as various shotguns and M4/M16 Assault rifles.

The range of skills TORS operators possess include bushcraft and navigation, close quarter tactics, entry methods, ballistic shield operations, cordon and perimeter operations, advanced weapons training, and less than lethal tactics.

=== Negotiation Unit ===
In 1979 the NSW Police ran their first Hostage Negotiator Unit course forming a part-time on call unit. In 1991 with the creation of the SPG the term hostage was dropped due to the variety of call-outs the unit was used for and a small full-time cadre established.

At present under the supervision of a small full-time cadre, trained negotiators are on call across the state on a part-time, as-needed basis. Negotiators work hand in hand with other units of the State Protection Group in order to resolve incidents peacefully.

Roles and tasks

- Suicide intervention
- Persons with mental health issues
- Kidnapping/extortion
- Sieges/hostage situations
- Barricaded offender situations
- Escapees
- Warrants – search, high-risk warrant execution
- Public order management
- National counter-terrorism incidents

=== Intelligence Unit ===
This unit provides intelligence information to negotiators and other TOU officers involved in high-risk incidents. Such intelligence may include information on people involved (offenders, hostages or suspects), or the provision of plans and photographs of premises.

=== Police Rescue and Bomb Disposal Unit ===
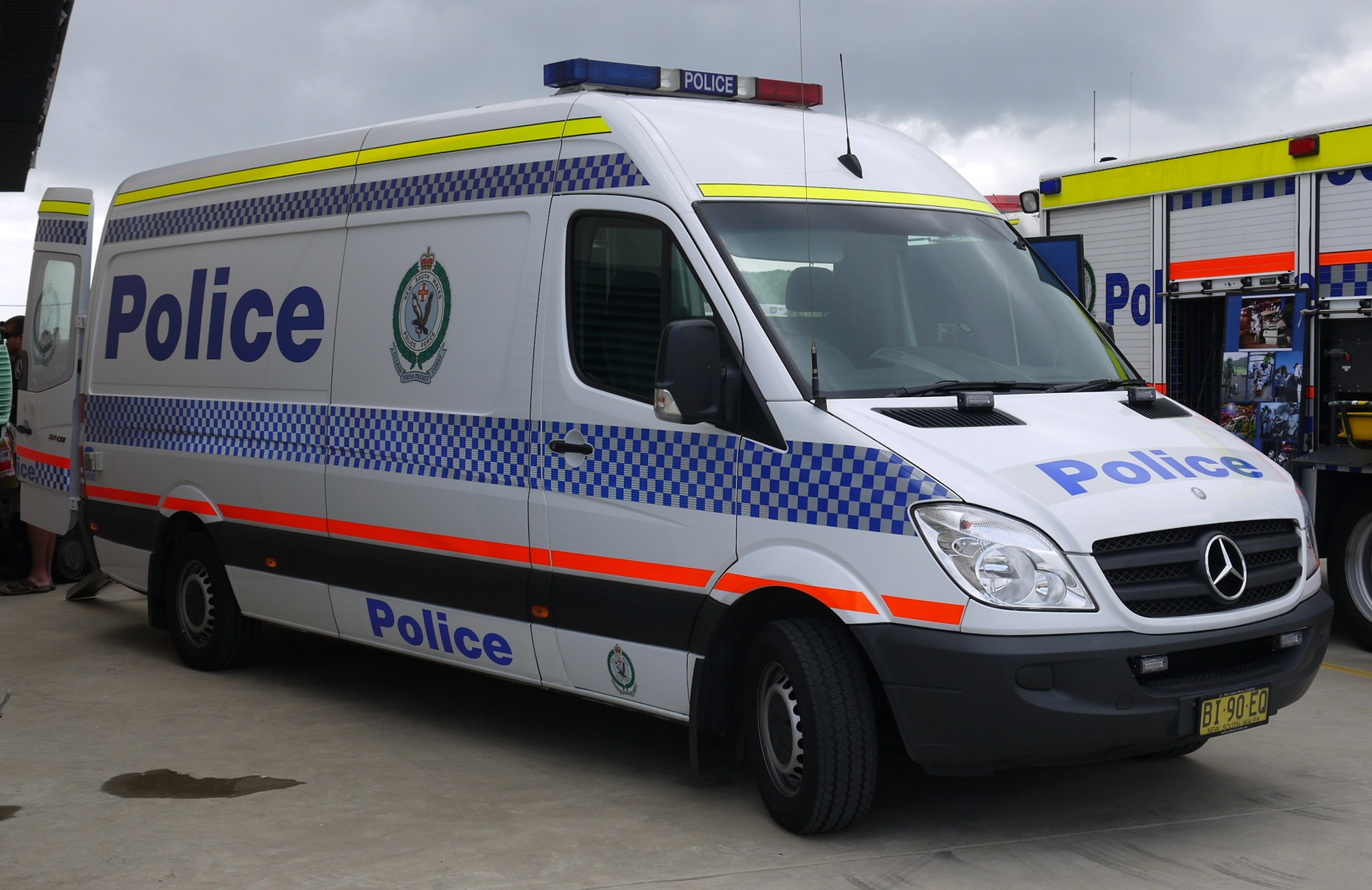
Police Rescue and Bomb Disposal Unit Mercedes Benz Sprinter

Originally created in 1942 as the Police Cliff Rescue Squad for the express purpose of recovering the bodies of suicide victims, or rescuing persons trapped on cliffs. The Police Rescue and Bomb Disposal Unit has undergone numerous changes and expansions over the years. Apart from responding to 000 emergency calls, the Police Rescue Unit provides specialist search and rescue support of operational police in situations of any risk category. This support extends from searches for evidence, to working with negotiators at extreme heights.

Police Rescue operators are trained to use equipment such as Jaws of Life, metal detectors, trapped person locaters, sophisticated communication equipment and cutting tools etc. These officers are experts in abseiling, climbing, single rope techniques and stretcher escorts with cliff machines.

The Units core responsibilities include:

- General Rescue,
- Specialist Support,
- Land Search and Rescue
- Bomb Response and Disposal.

Some of the Rescue Unit's responsibilities and challenges include:

- Rescuing people trapped in difficult high or deep places such as mines, storm-water drains, cliffs, scaffolding and remote places.
- Rescuing people involved in industrial, traffic, railway and aircraft accidents or who may have become trapped in household equipment, machinery or playground equipment.
- Providing power or lighting in emergencies or for police operations
- Rescuing livestock and animals in accidents
- Working in toxic or hazardous environments

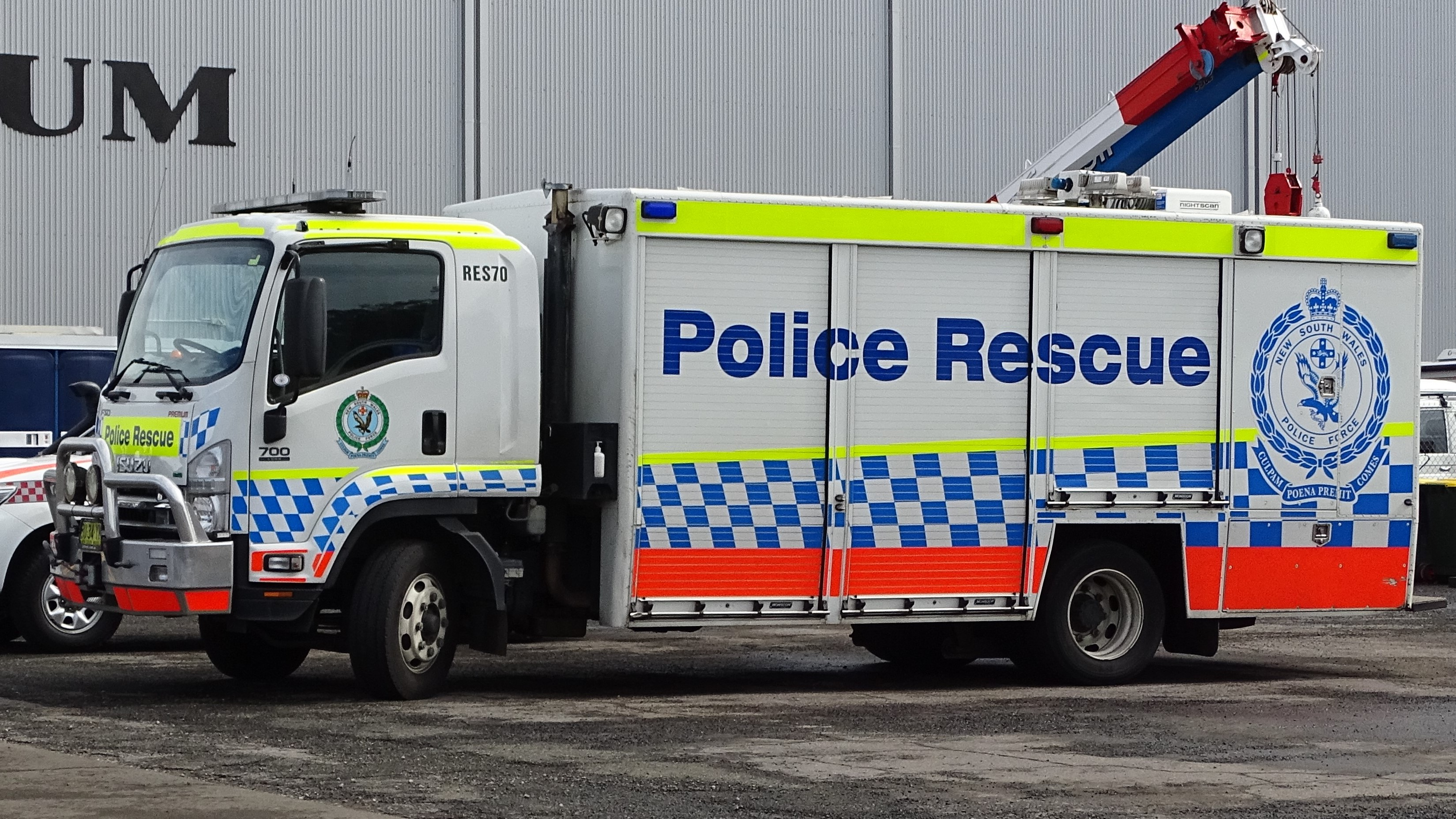
One of several Police Rescue Heavy Rescue units

In 1993 the Department of Defence handed over bomb disposal responsibilities to the NSW Police Force. The Bomb Disposal section was established within Forensic Services and then in 1997, the section was relocated to the SPG. Prior to the 2000 Sydney Olympic Games, the Bomb Disposal section was amalgamated with the Rescue Unit.

The Police Rescue and Bomb Disposal Unit is based in Alexandria (Sydney). Decentralized units are based in the Blue Mountains, Newcastle, Goulburn, Bathurst, Lismore and Oak Flats (formerly Wollongong). The mostly part-time decentralized units are responsible for rescue and bomb appraisal operations within their local area and provide specialist support tasks for operational policing that cannot be provided by other units or sections. Established in 2015, the newly formed Western Region Police Rescue Squad comprising general duty officers from Moree, Narrabri, Tamworth, Quirindi, Werris Creek, Armidale and Bourke provides specialist operational support to various police units across the Western Region.

The unit was the subject of an Australian ABC television series (1991–1996) and a 1994 feature film, Police Rescue.

The Police Rescue and Bomb Disposal Unit celebrated its 75-year anniversary in 2017 with the Blue Mountains Police Rescue Squad its 50th anniversary in 2018.

=== Rescue Squad Major Involvements ===
It is estimated that the unit has attended over 300,000 jobs in the past 60 years. The Unit has been involved in some of the state's, and Australia's, largest incidents, including the following:

- 1966 Wanda Beach Murders
- 1974 Cyclone Tracy
- 1977 Granville rail disaster
- 1978 Sydney Hilton bombing
- 1979 Sydney Ghost Train fire
- 1989 Newcastle earthquake
- 1989 Kempsey bus crash
- 1997 Thredbo landslide
- 1999 Glenbrook rail accident
- 2003 Waterfall train disaster
- 2007 Sydney Harbour ferry/pleasure cruiser crash
- 2008 Sydney Harbour boat collision
- 2009 British backpacker Jamie Neale search
- 2011 Mosman collar bomb incident
- 2011 Parramatta Bomb Hoax/Hostage Incident
- 2013 New South Wales bushfires
- 2014 Sydney Lindt Cafe Hostage Incident
- 2025 Bondi Beach Terror Attack

=== Dog Unit ===
More commonly referred to as the 'Dog Squad', the Police Dog Unit was initially created in NSW between 1932 and 1953 and was reintroduced in 1979.

The unit was established to support police in locating offenders and missing persons, detecting and detaining fleeing criminals and detecting drugs, firearms and explosives Dogs used for patrol duties are German Shepherds or Rottweilers. The Labrador Retriever is the breed of choice for specialist detection for narcotics and explosives, etc.

The Unit employs both male and female handlers, most of whom work two dogs. After training, all police dog teams are able to track and find wanted offenders or missing persons, search all types of buildings, detect illicit drugs, and support foot-patrolling of public places to deter crime and make these places safer for the community. The Dog Unit is the largest Dog Unit of any Police Force in Australia and provides specialist dogs for operations 24 hours a day, seven days a week across the State. The Dog Unit has teams based around the State. The main base is located at Menai with sections at Tweed Heads, Wagga Wagga and Dubbo.

As of July 2020 the NSWPF Dog Unit is the largest police dog unit in Australia with more than 100 police officers, eight civilian staff and more than 100 police dogs.

Dog Squad officers may be called upon to chase and apprehend offenders who may be escaping arrest and may be armed and dangerous or act as a deterrent and back up in dangerous situations such as brawls, sieges, riots and domestics. They are also used to provide high-profile foot patrols in places such as schools, industrial areas, shopping complexes and during large public events such as New Year's Eve or sporting events, etc.

The Dog Unit currently has the following capabilities/specialist dogs:

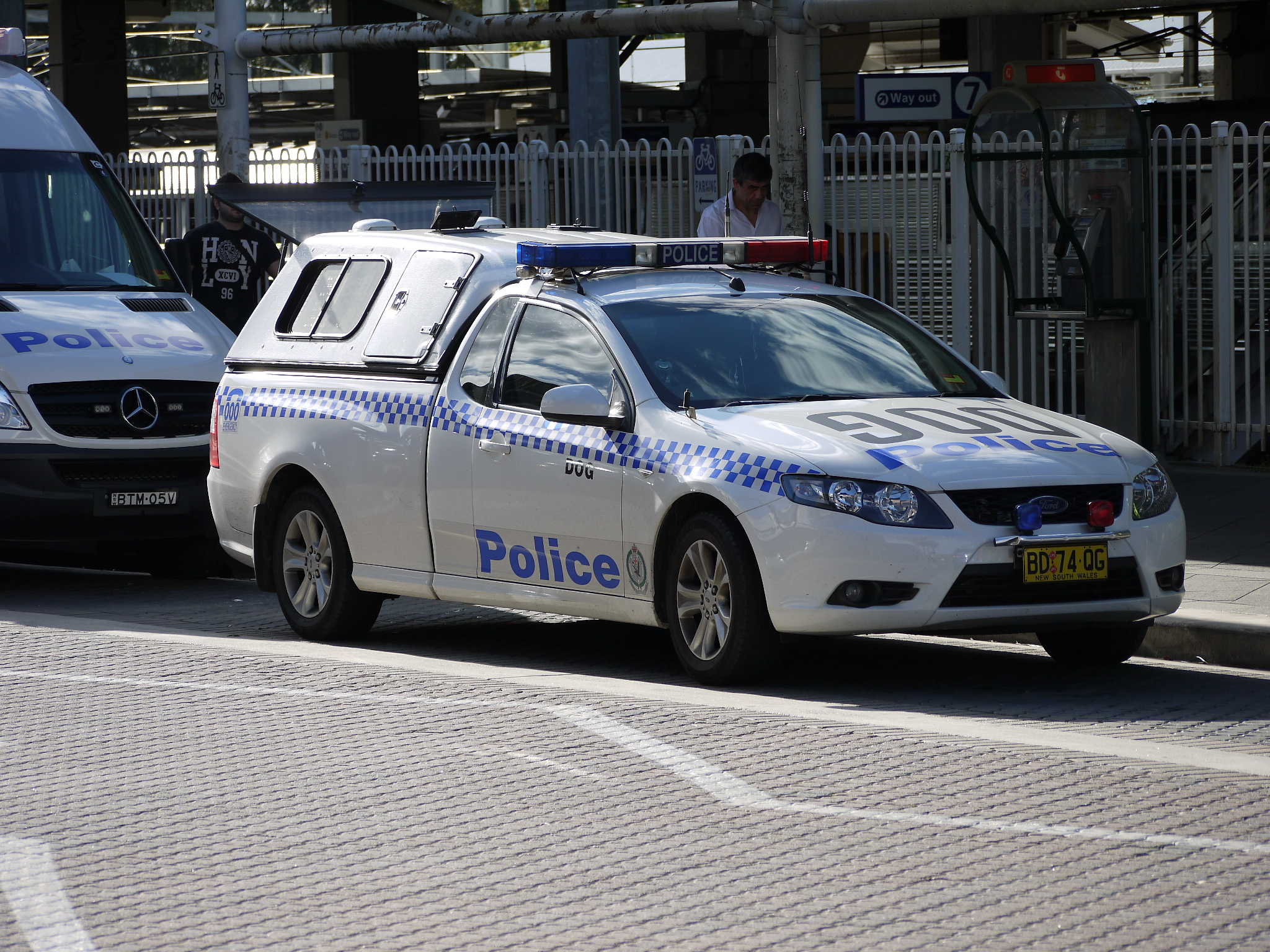
A Dog Squad Falcon R6

- general purpose and
- tactical dogs (who work closely with the TOU)
- public order
- drug detection
- firearms, explosives detection
- cadaver detection
- currency detection
- Urban search and rescue (USAR)

NSW Police Force general purpose and tactical dogs are also issued their own sets of canine body armour/ballistic vests.

The Dog Squad has been involved in numerous high-profile arrests since its creation including the arrest of Australia's "most wanted man", Malcolm Naden as part of "Strike Force Durkin".

== See also ==
=== NSW Police Force units ===
- Public Order and Riot Squad (NSW Police Force Riot Unit)

=== Australian tactical units ===
- Police Tactical Groups
- Tactical Assault Groups (Australian Defence Force)

=== International tactical units ===
- Police tactical unit
- List of police tactical units

=== Related articles ===
- National Counter-Terrorism Exercise
