= Special Tasks and Rescue =

Tactical group of the South Australia Police

Special Tasks and Rescue Group
- Active: 30 November 1978 – present
- Agency: South Australia Police
- Type: Police tactical group
- Role: Law enforcement; Counter-terrorism; Close Personal Protection; K-9 Unit; PolAir; Search and Rescue
- Part of: Security and Emergency Management Service
- Headquarters: Adelaide
- Common name: STAR Force, Starries
- Abbreviation: STAR Group

Structure
- Operators: 140 Members (in 2014)
- Subunits: Dog operations unit; Mounted operations unit; Negotiator coordinator section; Water operations unit; Bomb unit

The Special Tasks and Rescue Group (STAR Group) is the police tactical group of the South Australia Police.

== History ==
Formed on 30 November 1978, the South Australian Police 'STAR Force' was a rationalisation of specialist resources into one command/unit. Specialist units had existed prior to 1978 within SAPOL to deal with emergency situations such as rescues, sieges and armed offenders situations. The Group traces its history back as far as July 1957 with the formation of the Police Rescue Squad, which was later changed to Police Emergency Operations Group. The unit was later to change its name from "Force" to "Group".

While STAR Group officers rarely have to fire their weapon, there have been some incidents in which STAR group officers have fired upon an armed suspect and killed their target as per operation guidelines.

As in other states, SAPOL decided that it would be more practical and expedient to combine all the skills of various tactical/special units in one unit and to have specialist personnel on duty or available on call, at all times to deal with emergencies.

Further restructuring in 1994 saw STAR Group expand its role to include Water Police and the co-ordination of Negotiators. Certain incidents automatically trigger a STAR Group response such as a high speed chase of offenders known or likely to be armed.

In 1998, female police officer Jane Kluzek became the first female officer to complete the STAR Group selection course and in doing so became the first ever female tactical operator in an Australian police tactical group. In 2017/18 SAPOL implemented a program to encourage more women to take part in STAR Group operations, and while five women undertook training and one woman applied for pre-selection, she was not successful in obtaining a position.

== Mission ==
STAR Group is designed to handle problems and situations which require more concentrated attention than can normally be provided by the General Patrol Police and/or which call for tactics and/or equipment which cannot be used by patrol members in uniform.

The unit consists of highly trained personnel skilled in the use of firearms, counter-terrorist tactics, crowd control, crime prevention techniques, underwater recovery, water policing, Close Personal Protection and search and rescue operations. Thus there is available at all times a mobile patrol force to assist other line units in emergencies of any kind, and to act as a support force in crime control operations.

In 2006, STAR Group response to over 335 search and rescue incidents and 126 tactical/high-risk operations across the State.

== Principal roles ==
- Search and rescue
- Helicopter operations
- The arrest of armed and dangerous offenders
- Provide close-quarter protection and related security measures as necessary.
- VIP Security
- Patrol deployment as a crime prevention
- Resolving siege and hostage situations, as well as armed offender situations;
- Riot/crowd control

== Structure ==
STAR Group is part of the Security and Emergency Management Service and comprises several sections:

=== Operations Section ===
The Operations Section is responsible for a myriad of tasks including high-risk policing, counter-terrorist response, search and rescue operations and the supplementation of general duty patrols.

Each member is required to develop and maintain skills in weapons handling, high-risk policing, counter-terrorist standard operating procedures, VIP protection, search and rescue operations, civil disorder techniques and many other functions peculiar to S.T.A.R. Operations. Select individuals within S.T.A.R. Operations develop specialist skills in one key area allowing the provision of helicopter aircrew, marksmen/observers, VIP drivers, Search and Rescue Coordination and bomb technicians.

S.T.A.R. Operations members travel extensively performing their duties statewide, nationally and internationally. During any given week, a S.T.A.R. member may be required to manage a Search and Rescue Operation in the far north of South Australia, assist with the extradition of an accused person from interstate or accompany immigration staff as far afield as India or Europe to enact deportation orders. Members also participate in many national and international training programs frequently travelling interstate to attend multi-discipline training courses. Other members have undertaken training courses in Britain the United States and Germany.

=== Dog Operations Unit ===
The South Australian Dog Operations Unit provides support to operational police through the deployment of highly trained dog teams. Each team comprises a trained dog, being either a German Shepherd or Labrador retriever dog and handler. These dog teams are based in metropolitan Adelaide but are able to respond to calls for assistance throughout the State. Police dog teams are trained to carry out duties involving tracking, searching, criminal apprehension, drug detection and explosive detection.

The Dog Operations Unit plays an important role in assisting to keep the community safe in South Australia. The natural instincts and abilities of a dog to follow a track or locate a hidden/lost person or object cannot be replicated by modern technology.

The Dog Operations Unit is on call 24 hours a day, seven days a week.

=== Water Operations Unit ===
Water Operations Unit is responsible for policing the coastal and inland waters of South Australia and provides the capability for search and rescue in those waters. The unit was officially formed in September 1995 with the merger of the Underwater Recovery Section and Water Police. There are five vessels varying from a five-metre inflatable dinghy to a 16-metre launch. The vessels are also used as diving platforms for police divers. The divers assist local police in the recovery of bodies or submerged objects from the sea, inland waters and caves.

All water responses (sea search and rescue, water policing, diving, and Marine Crime Watch) are conducted by this Unit.

=== Mounted Operations Unit ===
The South Australia Mounted Police is an integral part of today's policing strategies, unique in its contribution to the maintenance of law and order. Apart from the highly visible roles of escort duties and mounted patrols, there are many ways the Mounted Operations Unit contributes to the safety of the people.

The size gives the mounted officer a greater field of view than the foot or mobile officer while, at the same time, providing a more obvious police presence. Generally, they have access to the same areas as other officers and can operate in areas impractical or inaccessible to officers in vehicles or on foot.

Imposing as they are, the non-aggressive presence of the horse enables mounted officers to safely and quickly defuse violent or antisocial situations, quite often without the hostility usually directed at other officers in similar circumstances. The mere presence of a police horse attracts immediate attention and provides an excellent medium for police and public interaction, particularly with those who would normally avoid police contact. When properly deployed, the mounted officer is an effective and modern police resource.

=== Negotiator Coordinator Section ===
The Negotiator Coordination Section provides support to operational police by deployment of trained negotiators throughout the State. Under the National Guidelines, negotiation is considered the first option to achieve a peaceful resolution in high-risk incidents and negotiators respond to all types of incidents where their expertise may be of assistance.

=== Bomb Response Unit ===
The Bomb Response Unit is the bomb squad of South Australia Police. Responsibilities of this unit include the disposal of improvised explosive devices (IED) and other explosive material, clearing explosives scenes before post-blast examination, conducting high risk searches for bombs, explosives, booby traps etc. and co-ordinating responses for military ordnance.

Bomb Response Unit (BRU) is responsible for:

- Disposing of improvised explosive devices (IED) and /or explosive material
- Disposing of commercial explosives
- Clearing explosives from safes
- Clearing explosives scenes before post-blast examination
- Advising members of the public on measures to counter bomb threats
- Conducting high risk searches for bombs, explosives, booby traps etc.
- Maintaining a capability to respond, as required, to all terrorist incidents
- Coordinating responses for military ordnance

== Equipment ==
Equipment usage varies mission-to-mission.

=== Weaponry ===
- Blaser R93 Tactical Sniper Rifle
- Standard Smith & Wesson M&P .40 S&W Semi Automatic Pistol
- M4 Carbine Assault Rifle
- ASP Extendable Baton
- Handcuffs
- Taser
- Bodycam

=== Vehicles ===
In 2011, STAR Group took delivery of a Lenco BearCat armoured vehicle available for use in siege or terrorist situations. The Bearcat replaces a previous Tenix Defence S600 armoured rescue vehicle used by the Group.

- Lenco BearCat Armored Truck
- Toyota Land Cruiser

== See also ==
- Australian Defence Force Tactical Assault Group
- List of police tactical units
- National Anti Terrorism Exercise
