= National Counter-Terrorism Exercise =

National Counter-Terrorism Exercises involve the Australian Federal Government and all States and Territories designed to test Australia's counter-terrorism response arrangements. Australia's national counter-terrorism arrangements are well practised with major exercises held annually. The Department of Home Affairs manages the Counter-Terrorism Capability Branch in the Centre for Counter-Terrorism Coordination which supports the Australia-New Zealand Counter-Terrorism Committee (ANZCTC) who run the exercise program. The exercise was formerly named National Anti-Terrorism Exercise (NATEX).

The program includes tactical response exercises, discussion exercises, investigation and consequence management exercises and multi-jurisdictional exercises. Such incidents practised include recapturing buildings, freeing hostages, cordoning off areas or responding to a chemical, biological, radiological, nuclear or explosive attack.

Exercises of various types are tested and run several times per year, testing various elements of the Australian Defence Force such as the Tactical Assault Group (West & East) and the Special Operations Engineer Regiment within the Special Operations Command.

Exercises involve various elements of State/Territory Police Forces such as their respective Police Tactical Group and various intelligence agencies and units such as ASIO. As well as involving various elements of the Federal Government exercises also test the capability, co-ordination and response of the State/Territory Government, State Emergency Services, the Department of Home Affairs, the Australian Defence Force, the Australian Federal Police and other Commonwealth agencies.

Exercises are tailored to prepare for specific events such as the 2000 Sydney Olympic games, 2006 Melbourne Commonwealth Games and the 2007 Sydney APEC forum.

== Type of exercises ==
The Centre for Counter-Terrorism Coordination maintains what is known as the 'National Counter-Terrorism Exercise Program'. This program involves a range of tactical, operational and strategic level exercises, which are conducted on a rotational basis throughout all Australian States and Territories.

There are four main counter terrorism exercises conducted under the NCTC National Exercise Program:

- MJEX (Multi-Jurisdictional Exercise)
- ICMEX (Investigation and Consequence Management Exercise)
- TACREX (Tactical Response Exercise)
- DISCEX (Discussion Exercise)

== Counter terrorism exercises ==
- 2015 - 'Hermes Castle' - Multi-agency counter-terrorism exercise held at Holsworthy Barracks to test emergency and defence response to a scenario that involved armed terrorists storming the base and causing mass destruction.
- 2013 - Multi-agency counter-terrorism exercise testing emergency services response to a simulated terrorist attack on the Australian Nuclear Science and Technology Organisation (ANSTO) nuclear reactor at Lucas Heights.
- 2013 - Australian Defence Force counter-terrorism exercise testing ADF Tactical Assault Group response to a simulated terrorist attack on the inner Sydney, Martin Place, underground rail network and CDB.
- 2011 - ‘Black Angus’ - Multi-agency counter-terrorism exercise held at Sydney Olympic Park testing police and other agencies response to Mumbai style terrorist attack.
- 2010 - 'Mercury 10' - Multi-jurisdictional counter-terrorism exercise held across ACT, Tasmania, Victoria, South Australia, Queensland and the Northern Territory.
- 2010 - 'Metro Surge' - Multi-agency counter-terrorism exercise held in Western Australia.
- 2009/2010 - 'Prometheus', 'Proteus', 'Baccus' - Queensland Police exercise focus sing on a variety of State specific events/locations.
- 2009 - 'Hotel Taunt' - Queensland Police and Australian Customs Service exercise held in Brisbane.
- 2008 - 'Mercury 08' - Multi-jurisdictional counter-terrorism exercise held across Western Australia and Queensland.
- 2007 - 'Southern Contact' - Multi-agency counter-terrorism exercise held in Tasmania testing operational response of various agencies to incidents.
- 2006 - 'Blue Luminary' - Multi-Agency counter-terrorism exercise held in Sydney in preparation for the 2007 APEC summit.
- 2006 - 'Western Explorer' - Counter-terrorism response capability exercise held in Western Australia.
- 2005 - 'Mercury 05' - Multi-jurisdictional counter-terrorism exercise held in Victoria focused on preparation for the 2006 Commonwealth Games held in Melbourne.
- 2005 - 'Mars Anchor' - Australian Defence Force Special Operations Command counter-terrorism exercise held in preparation for Mercury 05 and the 2006 Commonwealth Games.
- 2004 - 'Mercury 04' - The inaugural multi-jurisdictional exercise involving Tasmania, South Australia, the Northern Territory and Victoria.
- 2003 - 'Scrummage' - Multi-jurisdictional counter-terrorism exercise held in preparation for the 2003 Rugby World Cup.
- 2001 - Major exercises held in preparation for the 2002 Commonwealth Heads of Government Meeting held in Brisbane.
- 2000 - 'Ring True' A multi agency exercise run by the Commonwealth and State Standing Advisory Committee on Protection against Violence (SACPAV) held at multiple locations around the State in preparation for the Sydney 2000 Summer Olympics.

== Relevant units ==
- (Australia) Australian Defence Force - Tactical Assault Group, Incident Response Regiment
- (Australia) Police Tactical Group
- (Australia) Australian Federal Police - Operational Response Group
- (Australia) Australian Federal Police - Specialist Response and Security Team
- New South Wales - Tactical Operations Unit
- Northern Territory - Territory Response Group
- Queensland - Special Emergency Response Team
- South Australia - Special Tasks and Rescue Group
- Tasmania - Special Operations Group
- Victoria - Special Operations Group
- Western Australia - Tactical Response Group
- New Zealand - Armed Offenders Squad, Special Tactics Group

== See also ==
- Australian Special Air Service Regiment
- Counter-terrorism
