= Tactical Response Group =

Tactical Response Group may refer to:

- Tactical Response Group (Western Australia)
- State Protection Group, police tactical group in NSW, Australia
