= Victoria Police Special Operations Group =

Australian state police tactical unit

Special Operations Group
- Active: 1977–present
- Country: Australia
- Agency: Victoria Police
- Type: Police tactical group
- Role: Counter-terrorism; Law enforcement
- Part of: Security Services Division
- Headquarters: Melbourne
- Motto: Blessed are the peacemakers (from Matthew 5:9)
- Common name: Sons of God; Soggies
- Abbreviation: SOG

Notables
- Significant operation(s): Port Arthur massacre Melbourne gangland killings

The Special Operations Group (SOG) is the police tactical group of the Victoria Police. The SOG was Australia's first full time and dedicated police tactical group when it formed in 1977.

== History ==
The SOG was formed in secrecy on 31 October 1977 by Chief Commissioner Mick Miller to establish a group to conduct special operations in regard to counter terrorism that would be directed towards preventative/protective security and combatting operations. Terrorism meaning politically motivated criminal activity as well as other forms of criminal activity which terrorise innocent persons. The first the public was aware of the existence of the SOG was by an article in The Age newspaper in 1980. Prior to forming the SOG, Victoria Police had a part-time unit the Emergency Rifle Team (ERT) responsible for responding to siege-type situations.

In 1992, the Nine Network screened a television documentary on the SOG selection course, that included long runs, interspersed with scoffing warm beer and meat pies until the volunteers threw up, to demonstrate how drinking any alcohol while on call, would impair functioning. In 1995, following a review of the SOG as part of Project Beacon, safety-first tactics were introduced along with less-than-lethal equipment with the philosophy that use of force is the last resort. In 1996, the SOG became the first Police Tactical Group to deploy interstate, with ten officers urgently sent to Tasmania via charter plane to assist the part-time Tasmania Police Special Operations Group to respond to the Port Arthur massacre.

In 2003, the Bomb Response Unit (BRU) was established with dedicated officers within the SOG which had since inception provided a bomb search and disposal capability to Victoria Police. In 2004, the Critical Incident Response Team (CIRT) was formed to respond to high risk non-firearms incidents to reduce the SOG workload. Such as a call out in September 1998 when the SOG disarmed a sword-wielding mentally ill man in a two-hour stand off in front of a 2000-strong crowd near Flinders Street station. Earlier in 1995 during the SOG Review, there had been a proposal for two SOG teams consisting of four officers each to patrol Melbourne similar to CIRT.

In 2011, the SOG responded to 4 sieges, conducted 10 forced building entries, conducted 54 high-risk arrests and mobile intercepts, and 36 cordon-and-call operations.

The SOG has two nicknames Soggies and the Sons of God, the latter a backronym made from the initials SOG. The unofficial SOG emblem is telescopic crosshairs superimposed over a balaclava-clad head on an outline of Australia.

Notable incidents include the fatal shooting of Wayne Joannou in February 2005 in South Melbourne, Mohamed Chaouk in April 2005 in Brooklyn, Norman Leung Lee in July 1992 at Melbourne Airport, the manhunt for Melbourne Assessment Prison escapees in March 1993 near Jamieson, resolving a siege at a law firm in Mitcham in June 1996 with tear gas, and a siege in Kangaroo Flat in October 1999 in which four uniform officers had been wounded. Recents incidents include the Brighton siege in June 2017 and the fatal shooting of Stanley Turvey in Ardmona in September 2023. The SOG was responsible for the security of the 2006 Commonwealth Games.

== Role ==
The SOG provides Victoria Police with a counter terrorist and high risk arrest response capability. The SOG roles include, but are not limited to:

- Armed offender
- Terrorism or significant politically motivated violence
- Unplanned operational critical incidents, such as situations involving armed offenders including sieges and hostage situations
- Planned operations involving the arrest of dangerous suspects
- Undertaking searches of premises in high risk situations (level three)
- Bomb related incidents
- Covert surveillance or reconnaissance beyond the scope of operational police

The SOG is part of the Security Services Division of the Transit & Public Safety Command within Victoria Police.

In 2016, it was announced that the SOG strength would be increased by 20 new officers. Earlier in 2010, the strength of the unit had been cut to expand CIRT. In 2016, it was also announced that the SOG would develop a new capability with their own tactical dogs. In 2018, it was reported that the SOG had created a Quick Response Force to provide a rapid response to high risk incidents that can self-deploy unlike standard call-outs.

== Training ==
Volunteers for the SOG need to successfully complete a two-week selection course, and if successful, must then successfully complete a 12-week training course. The selection course is modelled on the US FBI Hostage Rescue Team course.

In 2016, it was announced that a new A$27 million training facility would be built. In April 2022, the Specialist Training Facility opened, it cost nearly A$60 million to build and has three firing ranges and a combat range.

Since 2016, several former Australian Army commandos from the 2nd Commando Regiment have completed a lateral-transfer program to become SOG operators. The program requires that they graduate from the police academy the same as ordinary police recruits.

== Equipment ==
Since its inception the SOG wore an iconic black uniform synonymous of the SOG. In 2021, the uniform colour changed to khaki. The SOG use a variety of specialised weapons and equipment including the Smith & Wesson M&P pistol, SIG MCX SBR rifle, Remington 12-gauge shotguns, sniper rifles and 40 mm grenade launcher.

In July 2018, the SOG took delivery of two Lenco BearCat armoured rescue vehicles, one funded by the Victorian Government and the other purchased by Victoria Police, to replace their older model BearCat. In April 2013, the SOG had taken delivery of a BearCat funded by the federal government. The BearCat had replaced a Canadian made Armet Armored Vehicles Balkan Mk7 that had been in service since 2009. The Balkan had replaced their first armoured vehicle, a British made Composite Armoured Vehicle (CAV) 100 Land Rover Defender, acquired in 1995 after being imported for trialling by the Special Air Service Regiment. In 2016, the acquisition of three new ballistic rated vehicles was announced.

== See also ==
- Tactical Assault Groups (Australian Defence Force)
- National Counter-Terrorism Exercise
