= Special Emergency Response Team (Queensland) =

Australian police tactical unit

- Active: 1968–present
- Country: Australia
- Agency: Queensland Police Service
- Type: Police tactical group
- Role: Law enforcement; Counter-terrorism
- Part of: Specialist Response Group
- Headquarters: Brisbane
- Abbreviation: SERT

Structure
- Officers: 50 full-time
- Subunits: Cairns

Special Emergency Response Team (SERT) is the police tactical group of the Queensland Police Service (QPS) and also provides a high angle rescue response. SERT provides the QPS with the ability to respond to high risk situations incidents statewide. SERT is based in Brisbane and Cairns to ensure specialists capabilities are available to support police at any location in Queensland.

== History ==
In mid-1966, Jack Pizzey, then Minister for Education and Police, instructed the Commissioner of Police to form an Emergency Squad. Hand-picked officers completed specialised training with the New South Wales Police Force similarly named unit and became operational in 1968. Initially, the Squad included 33 men, handpicked and trained in tactics to apprehend armed offenders in siege situations, hijacking of aircraft and counter-terrorism.

In the mid 1980s, the Emergency Squad was a part-time unit of 50 officers, from various sections of the Brisbane Criminal Investigation Branch and from uniform, with officers performing normal policing duties and responding to incidents as required. In addition, a small six man Emergency Squad was located in Townsville to respond to incidents in North Queensland and to act in a holding capacity until the arrival of Brisbane officers.

In 1987, the Emergency Squad was divided into sub-units and renamed the Tactical Response Group (TRG). In 1989 the Tactical Response team, a part of the TRG became a separate unit, the Special Weapons and Operations Squad (SWOS). SWOS was a part-time unit with officers performing normal policing duties, responding to incidents as required and training one day per a fortnight.

In 1992, the Queensland Police Service established a full-time dedicated police tactical group the Special Emergency Response Team (SERT) from SWOS. The role of SERT also included undertaking of high angle rescue and land search coordination.

SERT had a long tradition of training with Japanese police Special Assault Team officers providing an opportunity to share tactics, equipment and training methodologies.

Notable recent incidents include disarming an armed man in the Queen Street Mall in Brisbane in March 2013. In December 2018, SERT assisted in the apprehension of two gunmen during a six-hour long siege in Auchenflower, wherein one officer was shot at, but not wounded. SERT contributed to the security forces assigned to protect the 2014 G20 Brisbane summit and 2018 Commonwealth Games.

In December 2022, SERT responded to the Wieambilla shootings after general duties police officers had been ambushed on a rural property at Wieambilla resulting in the death of two officers and a civilian. SERT operators were involved in a siege at the property for several hours with the three offenders who they killed. The windscreen of SERT's armoured vehicle, a BearCat, was damaged by gunfire. The ambush has since been declared a religiously motivated terrorist attack. The siege is regarded as the most dangerous operation ever undertaken by SERT.

== Structure ==
The primary unit of SERT is based in Brisbane part of the Specialist Response Branch in the Operations Support Command within Queensland Police Service. The sub-unit based in Cairns is part of the Far North District in the Far Northern Region under the operational command of the Specialist Response Branch. The Specialist Response Branch also includes the Negotiator Coordination Unit and Explosive Ordnance Response Team (EORT) who both work closely with SERT. SERT has its own police dogs.

== Role ==
The role of SERT includes:

- counter-terrorism operations
- resolving siege and hostage situations, as well as armed offender situations
- undertaking searches of premises in high risk situations
- arrest of armed and dangerous offenders
- escorting and securing dangerous prisoners in high risk situations
- high angle rescue
- less lethal tactics deployment
- water and airborne operations and insertion
- witness protection.

== Selection ==
In 2006, to qualify for a three-day selection course SERT candidates have to undergo a gruelling fitness regime.

They must complete a minimum of 10 chin ups, 35 push-ups and 100 sit-ups all to cadence, then run 10 kilometres (6.2 mi) in under 46 minutes and finally swim 400 metres (1,300 ft) in under 10 minutes. All this is done consecutively without a rest. This is the minimum fitness standard required, and is assessed with zero tolerance.

The three-day selection course is regarded as the most difficult and physically demanding course within the Service. It tests physical and mental endurance through individual and team tasks, problem solving, sleep deprivation, basic survival skills and by challenging phobias for example heights and closed spaces. Several female officers have attempted selection.

Candidates who are successful on the selection course are invited to attend a 14-week training course where all the skills of the unit are taught. The first four weeks consist of physical training, two hours in the morning and two hours in the evening, interspersed with weapons validations and training. The next two weeks consist of rural tactics and marksman training. The next six weeks consist of close quarter tactics, methods of entry, tactical driving, roping, fast roping and other skills.

Upon graduation, successful applicants can apply for available positions where they are put into a team where further training and validations are required before becoming operational. Specialist courses are then attended including water operations, breaching, advanced roping, advanced close quarter tactics and opportunities to attend advanced training with other police and military units.

== Equipment ==
In April 2011, SERT took delivery of a Lenco BearCat armoured vehicle designated the Armoured Response Vehicle (ARV), provided by the Queensland Government and with the internal layout and configuration specially designed to SERT's specifications. In July 2012, SERT received a second Lenco BearCat provided by the Commonwealth Government that is based in Cairns. In March 2017, the QPS received a third Lenco vehicle, a Bombcat, similar to the BearCat, but modified to transport a bomb disposal robot, for the Explosive Ordnance Response Team. In January 2017, SERT took delivery of an OzBot Titan robot, designed by Deakin University for SERT, that can remotely, breach doors and windows, assist in the rescue of hostages, deliver and retrieve items in dangerous locations, and improve situational awareness with its digital camera. In 2023, the Queensland Government announced an additional BearCat would be acquired.

The sidearm carried is the Staccato 2011, which is exclusive to the unit as regular officers carry Glock 22 pistols. M4 Carbine style of rifles are also used and are customized to suit the needs of the unit.

== Mobile Response Capability ==
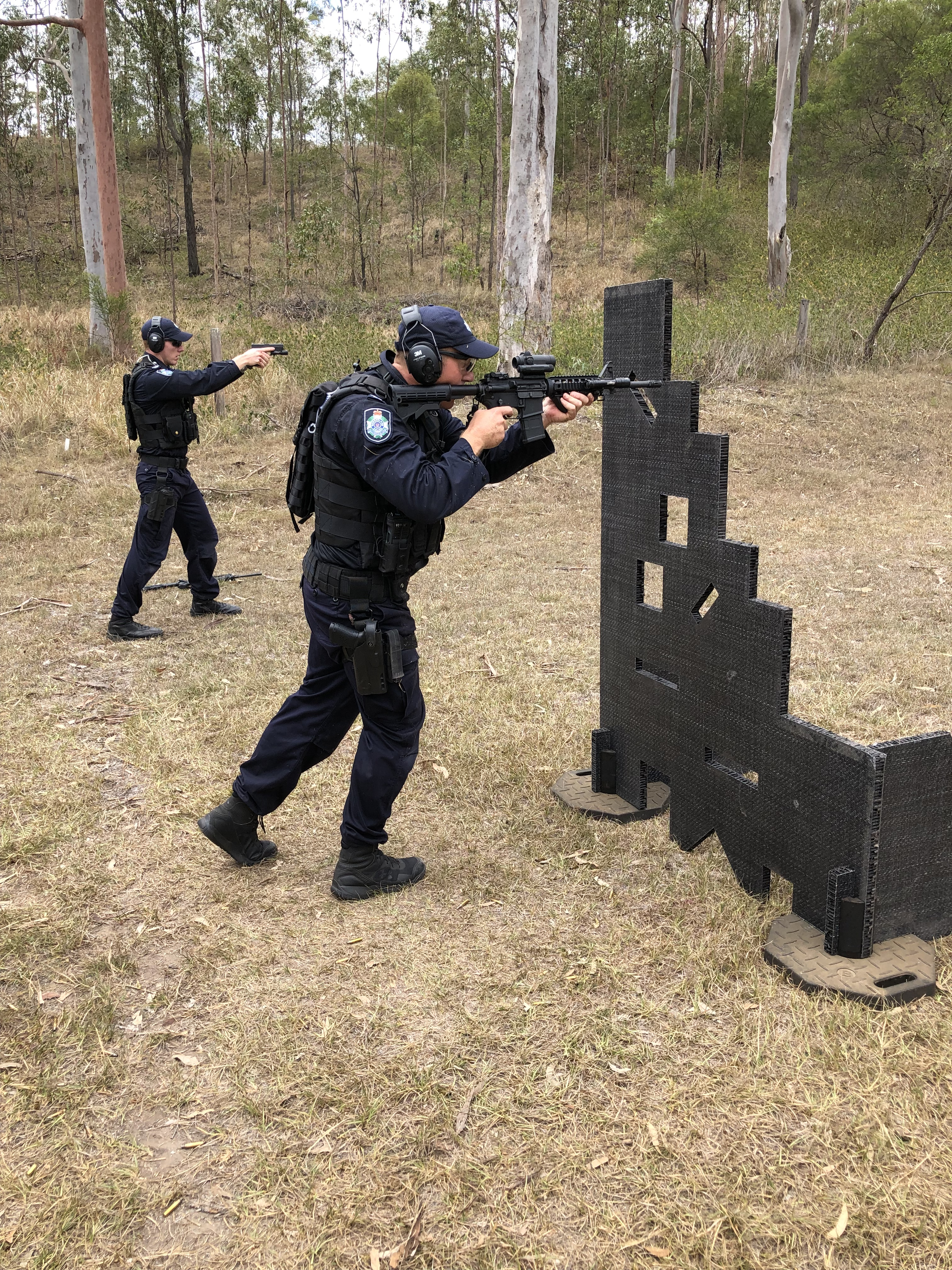
MRC shooting drills

Between July 2015 and January 2016, the Public Safety Response Team (PSRT) part of the Specialist Services Group within the Operations Support Command, trialled a Mobile Response Capability (MRC), utilising structured teams of four PSRT officers based on the Victoria Police Critical Incident Response Team model. The success of the trial has resulted in the MRC becoming embedded in the PSRT capability, primarily servicing Brisbane Metropolitan, Logan, and Ipswich Districts.

The MRC roles are to support first-response officers at high-risk situations to de-escalate the incident and also to conduct patrols around priority sites and critical infrastructure and places of mass gatherings to provide a timely response in the event of an incident.

The MRC has the ability to assist with containment and cordon placements of high-risk situations until the arrival of SERT and assist with hostage reception. MRC officers have a range of specialised equipment including helmets and ballistics shields, and are issued with Remington R4 and SIG Sauer SIGM400 rifles, and have a range of less-than-lethal options, including the Penn Arms 40mm grenade launcher, Remington 870 loaded with bean bag rounds and pepper-ball gun.

== See also ==
- Australian Defence Force Tactical Assault Group
