= Shorland S600 =

Armored personnel carrier

S600
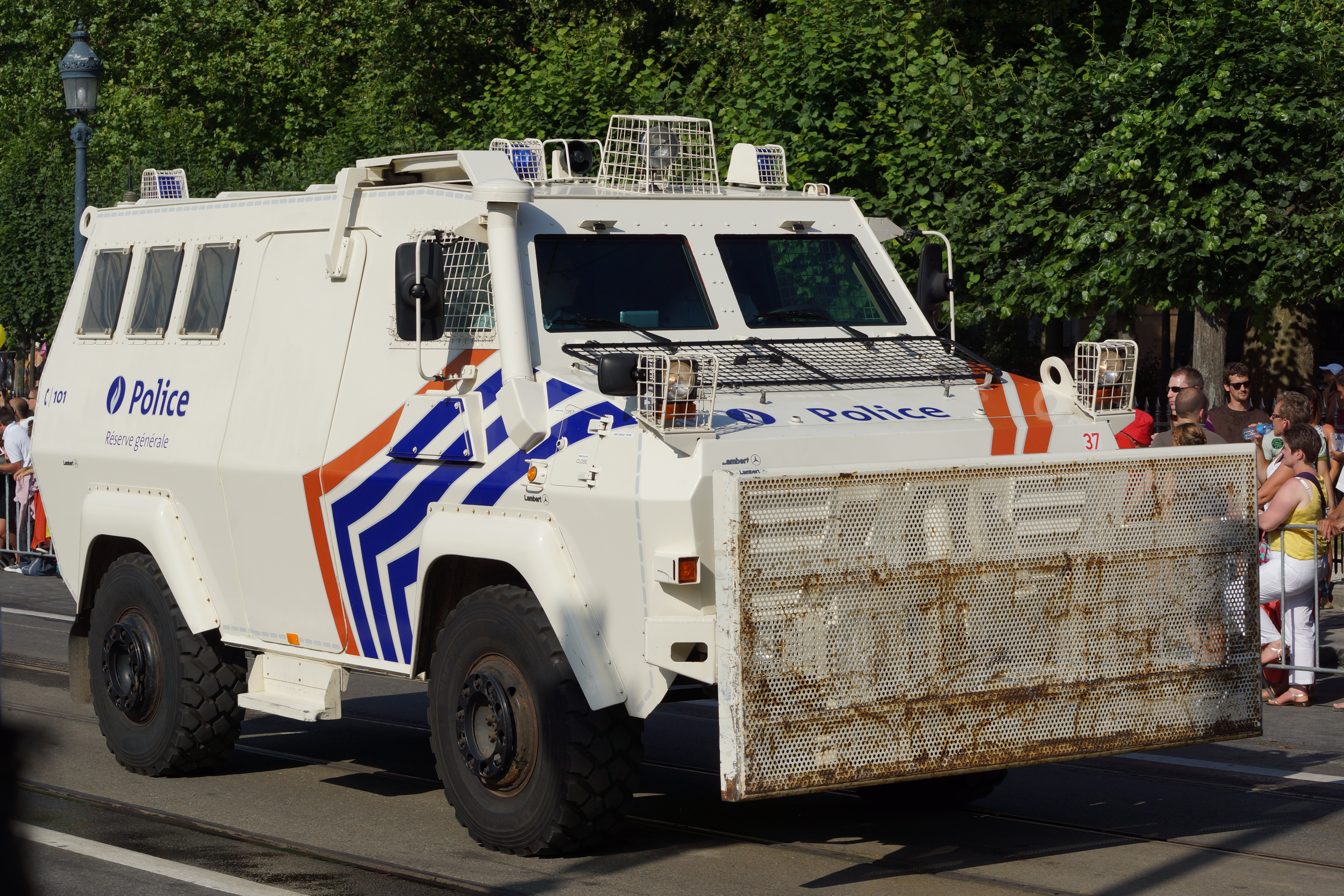

Specifications
- Mass: 12.5 t
- Length: 5,6 m (18.37 ft)
- Width: 2,45 m (8.04 ft)
- Height: 2,7 m (8.86 ft)
- Crew: 9–12
- Main armament: Optional 12.7mm M2 machine gun
- Engine: Mercedes-Benz OM-366LA 6 cyl turbocharged Diesel Engine; 214 HP (157 KW)
- Suspension: 4×4 wheeled
- Operational range: 1000 km (621.37 mi)
- Maximum speed: Road 108km/h (67.1 mph)

The Shorland S600 is an armored personnel carrier developed in 1995 as a private venture by Short Brothers plc in Northern Ireland. Unlike the previous Shorland armoured car series, which were based on the Land Rover Defender, Shorts used the much larger chassis and drive-train of the Mercedes-Benz Unimog U1550L/U2150L. In 1996 the Short Brothers sold the complete design to British Aerospace Australia. In 1997 the Kuwait National Guard ordered 22 S600 in five different versions. In 2006, prior to it being acquired by BAE Systems Australia in 2007, Tenix Defence supplied the South Australia Police Special Tasks and Rescue Group with a variant known as the Tenix S-600.

== Variants ==
- Ambulance
- Armoured Personnel Carrier
- Command Vehicle
- Mortar Carrier
- High Pressure Cannon Carrier
- Police Internal Security Vehicle - 12 seater
- Riot Control Vehicle - with light barricade remover
- Surveillance Vehicle

== Operators ==
- Australia - 1 previously used by the South Australia Police Special Tasks and Rescue Group
- Belgium - 6 Riot Control Vehicles for the Federal Police
- Kuwait - 22 in 5 versions (APC, CPV, ambulance, crowd control and mortar carrier) for the Kuwait National Guard
- Singapore - Singapore Police Force (Special Operations, Riot Control, Special Security)

== Vehicles on Display ==
=== Australia ===
- "Betsy", previously used by SAPOL, at the National Military Vehicle Museum in Edinburgh South Australia.
- "Phyllis", the BAE prototype hull, at the National Military Vehicle Museum in Edinburgh South Australia.

== See also ==
- Infantry fighting vehicle
- List of armored fighting vehicles
- Shorland armoured car
- Bushmaster IMV
