= Malcolm Naden =

Australian former fugitive from the law (born 1973)

- Born: Malcolm John Naden; 5 November 1973 (age 53)
- Known for: Most wanted man in New South Wales
- Status: Incarcerated
- Criminal charges: Murder x 2; Attempted Murder; Breaking and Entering; Indecent Assault
- Penalty: Life imprisonment without parole plus 40 years; (2013)
- Time at large: 6–7 years
- Escaped: June 2005
- Escape end: March 2012

Details
- Country: Australia
- State: New South Wales
- Locations: Dubbo; Lightning Ridge; Condobolin; Kempsey; Gloucester; Scone; Nowendoc
- Imprisoned at: Goulburn Correctional Centre

Malcolm John Naden (born 5 November 1973) is an Australian former fugitive from the law. At the time of his capture and arrest in March 2012, Naden was reported as being one of Australia's most wanted men and his arrest attracted international media coverage. Naden was in hiding from June 2005 until March 2012, wanted over murder and indecent assault offences. He was the most wanted man in the Australian state of New South Wales.

Naden was charged with the January and June 2005 murders of two young women, aggravated indecent assault on a 15-year-old girl in 2004, and shooting with intent to murder a police officer in 2011, while he was on the run. Naden pleaded guilty to all 32 counts against him, and was sentenced to life imprisonment plus 40 years without parole in June 2013.

== Crimes ==
In June 2005, Kristy Scholes was found strangled to death in the West Dubbo home of her boyfriend's grandparents. A few days later, her boyfriend's cousin, Malcolm Naden, disappeared from that same home. Prior to Scholes' murder, Naden had been named as a suspect in the disappearance of another cousin, Lateesha Nolan, who had been reported missing in January 2005.

In December 2005, police closed Western Plains Zoo, Dubbo after Naden was sighted there. There was an additional confirmed sighting of Naden over the next month near Lightning Ridge. In March 2006, Naden avoided capture at an Aboriginal mission, near Condobolin. In January 2007 police offered a $50,000 reward for information leading to his arrest. By January 2009, Naden was thought to be located near Kempsey, and by August 2010 he was believed to be living in dense bushland near Gloucester and Scone. By early 2011, the police doubled the reward to $100,000, and raised it further to $250,000 in December.

On 7 December 2011, a police officer from the Tactical Operations Unit was shot by Naden during an unsuccessful operation to capture him in bushland near Nowendoc. Naden was subsequently charged with the attempted murder of the officer.

== Capture ==
Naden was captured on 22 March 2012 in a run-down cabin approximately 30 km west of Gloucester by heavily armed officers from the Tactical Operations Unit in a night operation, and charged with the murder of Scholes. He faced court later that day and was refused bail.

On 14 April 2012, Naden was escorted from Goulburn Correctional Centre to Dubbo, where he assisted police by identifying a site at Butlers Falls, south of Dubbo. It was suspected that the remains of his cousin, Lateesha Nolan, are buried at that site, but no remains had been found at that time. Naden was later charged with the murder of Nolan and 14 counts each of burglary and theft committed while on the run.

In early December 2016 Police disclosed that remains were found at a location near the site investigated years earlier, which DNA testing confirmed belong to Ms Nolan.

== Sentence ==
In 2013, Naden pleaded guilty to 18 offences including the murders of Scholes and Nolan. He received a minimum prison sentence of 21 years for Nolan's murder, but was given a life sentence for the murder of Scholes. Other charges included the attempted murder of the police officer in 2011, breaking and entering offences and the indecent assault of a 12-year-old girl. Justice Derek Price said Naden had shown no remorse and there was a high risk he would reoffend because he has threatened to kill again, stating that "Life outside of prison is not an option for you". Naden said "thank you, your honour" after the sentence was handed down.

On 24 November 2013, while serving out his sentence, Naden was bashed by second cousin Dean Nolan, a relative of Lateesha Nolan, who was serving out a 24-year sentence at the time. Nolan, armed with a handle off a sandwich toaster, attacked Naden cracking several blows to Naden's head before being apprehended by prison staff. Nolan was later sentenced to an additional 12 months to his 24-year sentence for the attack on Naden, which he claimed was retribution for the heartache Naden had caused to his family.

== Capture dramatised ==
A dramatised version of the capture of Naden was aired on television on the Seven Network on 11 September 2013. This special television event, an episode of The Force: Behind the Line, presents the full story of "Strike Force Durkin", providing an insight into the fugitive that previously the viewers were not aware of. It re-aired on 13 September 2013 and again on 21 June 2016.

The book Tiger! Tiger! Tiger! by Ben Besant "Officer A" of the 2014 Lindt Cafe siege, contains a chapter entitled, "The Hunt for Malcom Naden: Australia's Most Wanted," which tells the story of the manhunt from the perspective of the NSW Tactical Operations Unit (TOU).
