= Operational Response Group =

- Active: 2005–2012
- Country: Australia
- Branch: Australian Federal Police
- Type: Police tactical unit
- Role: Counter-terrorism; Law enforcement
- Size: 200+ full-time Officers
- Part of: International Deployment Group
- Garrison/HQ: Canberra City ACT (HQ), Brisbane Queensland (FOB)
- Nickname: ORG
- Engagements: RAMSI, Black Saturday bushfires

Commanders
- Current commander: Commissioner Tony Negus

The Operational Response Group (ORG) was a former police tactical group of the Australian Federal Police (AFP) part of the AFP's International Deployment Group (IDG) that was established in 2005 to support the AFP in variety of national and international special policing operations. In July 2012, the ORG was merged with the AFP's Specialist Response and Security team (SRS) to create the Specialist Response Group.

== History ==
In January 2005 Australian Federal Police created what was then known as the Operational Response Team (ORT), a unit of specialist tactical police able to respond and assist AFP officers engaged in overseas deployments as part of the International Deployment Groups response to the Regional Assistance Mission to the Solomon Islands, Honiara. The ORT was soon expanded to fulfill further AFP domestic and international operations and included new roles (such as public order), and was renamed the Operational Response Group in 2006.

== Mission ==
The Operational Response Group was AFP's permanent specialist tactical and stability and the policing capability able to rapidly respond to civil disorder and international crisis, both nationally and internationally within 24 hours.

The Operational Response Group was defined as a police tactical group within the National Counter-Terrorism Committee arrangements providing the Commonwealth of Australia an offshore specialist and tactical policing response capability. The unit provided similar capabilities to the AFP's Specialist Response and Security Team but focused on national and international deployments outside of the Australian Capital Territory, where the SRS had responsibility. The ORG was created to enhance the operational policing capabilities of the AFP's International Deployment Group (IDG) operating predominantly in the Pacific region.

== Organisation ==
The ORG consisted of a number of specialist sub-units including:

- Tactical response teams,
- Stability response teams,
- Operational Support Unit (which included)
  - Maritime Unit,
  - Marksman Reconnaissance Team,
  - Tactical Intelligence Unit,
  - Communications Response Team,
  - Air Support Unit.

== Principal role ==
The ORG provided the AFP with a specialist tactical policing capability which included the following roles, :

- effect high risk searches, search warrants and arrests,
- support to public order policing,
- remote rural patrols,
- protection of people in high risk situations,
- support to the security of members deployed to mission (such as RAMSI),
- advanced training in specialist weaponry and less lethal capabilities,
- rapid response for containment and restoration of civil disorder,
- tactical negotiations, communications and marine operations support,
- remote and covert surveillance,
- prison-riot response,
- major civil-disorder interventions, and
- capacity building other specialist police overseas (such as Solomon Islands and Philippines).

== Deployments ==
Overseas

- Between 2005 and 2012, the Operational Response Group provided specialist police to assist the Australian Federal Police contingent with the Regional Assistance Mission to Solomon Islands (RAMSI). This included responding to riots in April 2006 and November 2010, and assisting with capacity building.
- In May 2006 ORG deployed members to East Timor to contribute to restoration of law and order.
- In November 2006 ORG deployed to Tonga in response to rioting and civil disorder.
- In 2008 the ORG deployed 65 members to East Timor, in response to a request for assistance from the Government of East Timor after the assassination attempts on the President and Prime Minister.

Within Australia

- February 2009 the AFP deployed 60 members of the Operational Response Group to assist the Victoria Police in the aftermath of the Black Saturday bushfires.
- March 2011 ORG deployed 61 members to Christmas Island in response to a detainee break out and riots at the North-West Point Immigration Detention Centre which was deemed Operation Ridley.
- February 2012 ORG deployed a team amongst other AFP (Operation Clement) to assist Queensland Police after the Queensland floods.

== Unit Closure ==
On 1 July 2012 the ORG merged with the ACT based Specialist Response and Security to create a single federal tactical, public order and bomb response unit known as the Specialist Response Group (SRG). The merger was designed to reduce the duplication between AFP and ACT Policing specialist units and centralise AFP assets under one command in Canberra. The SRG became operational on 1 July 2012 and it now contains various capabilities including tactical teams, public order (riot team), bomb response, K9 and police negotiators.
