= 1993 Jolimont Centre siege =

Crime in Canberra, Australia

Coordinates: 35.2777°S 149.1289°E

Jolimont Centre siege
- Australian Federal Police Special Operations Team approaching the Jolimont Centre wearing breathing apparatus.
- Location: Jolimont Centre, Canberra, Australia
- Date: 29 November 1993; 7:30 a.m.-9:30 a.m.
- Attack type: Hostage-taking, shooting, bombing
- Weapon: 12 gauge shotgun
- Deaths: 1 (the perpetrator)
- Injuries: 1
- Perpetrator: Felipe Ruizdiaz

In November 1993 an event known as the "Jolimont Centre siege" took place resulting in the serious wounding of one person and the death of another over the course of two hours. The centre was set on fire and extensive damage was caused by a lone gunman.

The Jolimont Centre, located in Canberra, Australian Capital Territory, was the home of the Department of Industrial Relations and radio station 2CA.

== Events ==
About 7:30 a.m., on 29 November 1993, 47-year-old Felipe Ruizdiaz shot and wounded local pool manager, Geoff McGibbon, at the Dickson Swimming Pool in Canberra before crashing his Toyota Hilux utility vehicle rigged with petrol and gas canisters through the front glass walls of the six-storey Jolimont Centre, home of the Department of Industrial Relations in Canberra, in an apparent revenge attack on his estranged wife. Ruizdiaz threw several petrol bombs and shot at the responding fire brigade and police officers.

During the resulting two-hour siege, Ruizdiaz shot at police and rescue workers using his 12-gauge shotgun before setting fire to the building and killing himself. The fire and explosions hampered rescue and police efforts and caused several million dollars' worth of damage to the centre, impacting on the building's owner—AMP Limited—and its tenants.

Two local radio stations and numerous employees were inside the centre at the time, requiring tactical police to assist in their evacuation. After several explosions, which resulted in the street being showered with broken glass, Australian Federal Police Special Operations Team personnel wearing breathing apparatus entered the centre, eventually locating the deceased gunman with shotgun wounds to his stomach and his body badly burned.

== See also ==
- Timeline of major crimes in Australia
- Crime in Australia
