= Police tactical group =

Generic term for highly trained Australian and New Zealand police tactical units

Police tactical group (PTG) is the generic term used to refer to highly trained Australian and New Zealand police tactical units that tactically manage and resolve high-risk incidents, including sieges, armed-offender situations and terrorist incidents.

Each state and territory maintain a PTG able to respond and resolve high-risk incidents across their jurisdiction, and inter-state when required. Police tactical groups are fundamental to the federal government's National Counter-Terrorism Plan (NCTP) to respond to major terrorist incidents in Australia.

The plan initially developed in 1980, then known as the National Anti-Terrorism Plan, is overseen by the Australia-New Zealand Counter-Terrorism Committee (ANZCTC). The plan requires each state and territory police to maintain a police tactical unit designated as a police tactical group (previously police assault group) which is jointly funded by the federal government and the respective state or territory government.

The Australia-New Zealand Counter-Terrorism Committee (ANZCTC) defines a police tactical group as a highly trained police unit that tactically manages and resolves high-risk incidents, including terrorist incidents.

Generally, the majority of a police tactical group's planned operations and call-outs are not related to terrorism, but consist of responding to high-risk incidents such as sieges or executing high-risk search warrants which are beyond the scope and capabilities of other police units in their state or territory.

== History ==
State and territory police maintained 'tactical' or 'emergency' squads consisting of officers trained to use specialist equipment and weapons as far back as 1945, although known by varying names. These squads consisted mainly of detectives and had limited capability and funding. The 1978 Sydney Hilton bombing, where a CHOGM event was being conducted at that time, saw the formation of the Standing Advisory Committee on Commonwealth and State Co-operation for Protection Against Violence (SAC-PAV). Prior to this, Australia had no formal mechanisms to respond to terrorism. SAC-PAV provided national consistency across all jurisdictions and made several recommendations, including that all states and territories maintain a specialist police unit trained for counter-terrorist and hostage rescue situations. These units were initially known as a 'police assault group' in line with the Australian Defence Force nomenclature with their then-recently created Tactical Assault Groups. This saw the formalisation of many state and territory tactical units with the standardisation of all police groups in respect to training, equipment and the desired level of response.

In 2001, SAC-PAV was renamed to the National Counter-Terrorism Committee and in 2012, with New Zealand joining, to the Australia-New Zealand Counter-Terrorism Committee (ANZCTC).

== Establishment ==
The primary providers of law enforcement in Australia are the federal state and territories. PTGs are police tactical units established to respond to high-risk situations which are beyond the scope or capacity of everyday policing. PTG officers directly support operational police in incidents such as sieges with specialist tactical, negotiation, intelligence and command support services. Each PTG conducts its own training, has the opportunity to train in inter-state courses and may train internationally and are able to be deployed by air, via waterways, using armoured vehicles and motorcycles if needed.

The Australian Federal Police who enforce Commonwealth (Federal) law has a national tactical unit that can be deployed in any state or territory for Commonwealth offences.

== Training exercises ==
A PTG will participate in regular national counter-terrorist exercises (NATEXs), in which federal and state government agencies practise responses to potential terrorist threats and test the procedures and legislation for Australian Defence Force support to civilian authorities in the event of a terrorist attack.

Each year as part of the ANZCTC Police Tactical Group Skills Enhancement Course, each state and territory sends several members of its PTG to participate in a concentrated three-week course with the Tactical Assault Groups of the Special Air Service Regiment and 2nd Commando Regiment to strengthen standards of policing in urban counter-terrorist tactics and ensure all states are training consistently to the same codes and standards of counter-terrorism.

PTG training is doctrinated, structured and set to a national standard which reduces inconsistent and fragmented training practices. These are designed to allow national interoperability of the PTGs if required.

The Australian PTGs undertake training with their New Zealand counterpart, the Special Tactics Group. Australian police taking part in a sniping course in Christchurch responded to the Christchurch mosques terrorist attack providing first aid to the victims and carried firearms for self protection.

== Interstate operational deployments ==
In 1996, the Victoria Police Special Operations Group deployed interstate to Tasmania to assist the Tasmania Police Special Operations Group with the Port Arthur massacre.

On 12 September 2025, the Victoria Police Special Operations Group was supported by police tactical officers from all Australian state and territory police tactical groups, and eleven officers from New Zealand, in their search for Dezi Bird Freeman who had allegedly killed two Victoria Police officers and injured a third on 26 August 2025. It was the largest police tactical operation in Australian history involving over 125 officers.

== Roles ==
Police Tactical Groups are responsible for (amongst other):

- Resolving siege and hostage situations;
- Arrest of armed and dangerous offenders;
- High-risk vehicle interceptions;
- Counter-terrorism and counter-hijacking operations;
- The escort and security of VIPs, internationally protected persons, heads of state;
- High-risk search warrants;
- Suicide intervention/rescue;
- Escorting and securing dangerous prisoners in high-risk situations;
- Providing operational support for major law enforcement operations.

Specialist positions include snipers, method-of-entry specialists, explosive breachers, tactical swimmers, tactical ropers, tactical coxswains, medics and advanced drivers.

== Equipment ==
All groups are jointly funded and equipped by both their respective state or territory police and federal government. Federal government funding allows purchases for more expensive equipment such as Lenco BearCat armoured rescue vehicles. The Australian Government has purchased eight ‘BearCats’ at a cost of approximately $400,000 each—one for each state and territory police tactical group.

== Skills Enhancement Courses ==
Each year Police Tactical Group operators attend Skills Enhancement Courses with the Tactical Assault Groups of the Special Air Service Regiment and 2nd Commando Regiment.

- Advanced breaching
- Advanced explosive breaching
- Advanced close quarters tactics
- Advanced sniping

== State, territory and federal units ==
=== Australia ===
- Australian Federal Police – Tactical Response Team
- New South Wales – Tactical Operations Unit, Tactical Operations Regional Support
- Northern Territory – Territory Response Group
- Queensland – Special Emergency Response Team
- South Australia – Special Tasks and Rescue Group
- Tasmania – Special Operations Group
- Victoria – Special Operations Group
- Western Australia – Tactical Response Group

=== New Zealand ===
- New Zealand Police – Special Tactics Group

== Police or ADF responsibility for terrorist incidents ==
In a 2017 article in the Australian Defence Force Journal, Captain John Sutton argued that the Australian Defence Force (ADF) should be responsible for responding to domestic counter terrorism incidents instead of the police tactical groups. Sutton raised concerns that military-style training and collaboration with the ADF by police tactical groups could filter down to general duties officers. However, the article also raised concerns that if the ADF was given powers to respond to domestic counter terrorism incidents those powers may be abused by the ADF.

== See also ==
- Australian Defence Force Special Operations Command
  - Tactical assault group
- List of police tactical units
