= Pong Su incident =

2003 North Korean drug smuggling attempt into Australia

The Pong Su incident began on 16 April 2003 when heroin was smuggled from the Pong Su, a North Korean cargo ship, onto an Australian beach. Australian military special forces subsequently boarded the Pong Su in Australian territorial waters four days later. The ship was suspected of being involved in smuggling almost 125 kilograms (276 lb) of heroin into Australia with an estimated street value of A$160 million.

The Pong Su (봉수호) was a 349-foot (106 m), 3,743-tonne North Korean-owned ocean freighter registered in Tuvalu, a flag of convenience. Three men arrested on shore were convicted of importing heroin; a fourth man from the ship who landed the heroin and was arrested on shore pleaded guilty; the crew were all acquitted and deported; and after being confiscated the ship was destroyed in 2006.

== Heroin trafficking ==
Operation Sorbet was an international operation by Australian police, who had been conducting surveillance on two people who had entered Australia in March 2003 from China, and a third person who had arrived from China on 9 April, all on tourist visas.

On the night of 15 April 2003, Australian Federal Police (AFP) conducted surveillance on two people who rendezvoused with the Pong Su close to shore at Boggaley Creek, near the seaside town of Wye River in Victoria, and followed them to a nearby hotel. The next morning, the two suspects were apprehended after leaving the hotel, and were in possession of two packages containing 50 kilograms (110 lb) of pure heroin. A third suspect was arrested later that day in nearby Geelong.

The following day, in a search of the beach at Boggaley Creek, police discovered the body of a man of East Asian appearance, close to a dinghy and covered by seaweed. He had been part of a two-man landing party from the Pong Su, but has never been identified. The dinghy had suffered fuel problems in the surf and had capsized landing the heroin, drowning one of the crew. On the same day, the second man from the landing party was apprehended in the immediate area by Victoria Police. He had been unable to get back to his boat and simply remained in the area where the drugs had been landed the night before. The AFP stated that they had been working on Operation Sorbet for several months, including with international peers. In May 2003, a further 75 kilograms (165 lb) of heroin in three packages was discovered buried near Wye River, after a search which followed coordinates from a seized GPS device. An additional 25-kilogram (55 lb) package of heroin had been lost during the landing.

== Interception of the ship ==
On the morning of 17 April, a Tasmania Police patrol vessel directed the Pong Su to head for Melbourne after it had travelled east entering the Bass Strait. In the afternoon, the Pong Su advised that it would head for Sydney and was directed to head for Eden. New South Wales Police patrol vessels became involved. In the morning of 18 April, the Pong Su changed direction to the east away from Australia towards international waters at speed with a police vessel having to terminate the pursuit due to rough weather. In the evening, Navy warship HMAS Stuart began tracking the Pong Su. In the morning of 20 April, after a four-day chase, Stuart intercepted the Pong Su 35 nautical miles (65 km; 40 mi) south-east of Newcastle with the Pong Su complying with most directions. Army Special Operations Tactical Assault Group (TAG) West/East operators boarded by simultaneously fast roping onto the deck from a Seahawk helicopter and from climbing the side onto the deck from three rigid-hull inflatable boats (RHIBs) with the crew compliant. The Pong Su was secured and brought into port in Sydney. Searches of the ship by Australian authorities revealed it had been modified for long voyages and was carrying enough fuel and provisions to travel around the world without needing to enter a port.

Some 30 men were arrested and detained. It was alleged that the North Korean government was involved in the manufacture and trade of the drugs. The North Korean government stated the ship was a "civilian trading ship" and the ship's owner had no knowledge of the illegal cargo.

== Drug charges ==
=== Guilty pleas ===
The three men arrested on shore pleaded guilty to aiding and abetting the importation of a commercial quantity of heroin. They denied that they were part of the ship's crew, and also denied that they were Korean, instead claiming to be from either Malaysia or Singapore. The three men were:

- Kiam Fah Teng, a Malaysian national and apparently the only one of the three to use his real name. He had taken the job as a member of the drug courier syndicate in order to repay business debts to loan sharks. Sentenced to 22 years' imprisonment.
- Yau Kim Lam, who claimed to be a Chinese national originally from Shenyang and to have more recently lived in Cambodia and Malaysia. He had entered Australia on a false Malaysian passport. Sentenced to 23 years' imprisonment. In prison, he spent most of his time together with Wong; late in his prison term he told an Australian fellow prisoner that he and Wong were from the same village, either being from the ethnic Korean community in China or from a village in North Korea near the Chinese border. When released from prison in 2019, he was issued with a North Korean passport under the name Rim Hak-myong (thought to be another pseudonym) and deported to North Korea.
- Wee Quay Tan, who had entered Australia using a stolen passport in the name of Chin Kwang Lee. Of unclear origin but possibly of Burmese Chinese background and raised in Singapore by a group of men involved in heroin trafficking, later living in Bangkok. Previously arrested and jailed in Denmark for heroin trafficking, before escaping from Danish prison in 2001 and returning to Bangkok. Sentenced to 24 years' prison.

Also pleading guilty was the surviving man from the landing party:

- Ta Song Wong (or Ta Sa Wong), who claimed to be a Chinese national of ethnic Korean descent. The prosecution argued he was actually the person named on ship records as "Kim Sung-bom", although this may have also been another pseudonym. Sentenced to 23 years' imprisonment. When released from prison in 2019, he was issued with a North Korean passport and deported to North Korea.

In 2019, Ta Sa Wong and Yau Kim Lam were released on parole, issued with North Korean passports, and deported to North Korea.

Teng was deported to his home country of Malaysia, while as of 2019 Wee Quay Tan remained in custody at Fulham Correctional Centre near Sale, Victoria.

=== Trial ===
The captain and crew of the Pong Su were charged with narcotics trafficking. Most significantly, an official of the governing Korean Workers' Party was found on board, linking the drug shipment to Kim Jong-il's government. According to Australian media reports, he had served as senior envoy in North Korea's embassy in China.

Under questioning, crew members insisted throughout that the ship was privately owned by the "Pong Su Shipping Company" and had no connection to the North Korean state, that they had never seen the two men who had brought the heroin ashore, that their voyage had been in order to pick up a cargo of luxury cars from Melbourne on behalf of a Malaysian company (later shown not to exist), and that they had only stopped off Boggaley Creek in order to conduct engine repairs.

Drug charges were laid against the ship's entire crew. Of the thirty crew members arrested, twenty-seven were discharged on 5 March 2004 by a magistrate on the basis that there was insufficient evidence for them to stand trial, although this number was reduced to twenty-six after it was later decided by Australian Federal Police that political secretary Choe Dong-song would also face trial.

While awaiting deportation, the 26 remaining crew members were held in Baxter Detention Centre; during which time they were questioned by federal authorities. They were deported from Australia on 24 June 2004.

Four senior crew members were kept in Australia to face a jury trial:

- Choe Dong-song (최동성), 61, the ship's political secretary
- Song Man-seon (송만선), 65, the ship's captain
- Lee Man-jin (이만진), 51, the first officer
- Lee Ju-cheon (이주천), 51, the chief engineer

All four crew members pleaded not guilty at the beginning of their trial in August 2005.

The prosecution case against the four North Korean officers was that they would not have allowed their ship to be stopped in the position it was if they were not aware that the real purpose of their voyage was to smuggle the heroin. The prosecution did not allege any official involvement of the North Korean government, only the officers on board the ship.

On 2 March 2004, the United States Department of State released a report using the incident to link Kim Jong-il's government to drugs trafficking.

On 5 March 2006, a Supreme Court of Victoria jury found the ship's four officers not guilty on all charges. They were subsequently deported.

== Fate of the Pong Su ==
After capture the ship was brought to Sydney Harbour where it was originally moored at Garden Island naval base. From there it was taken to Snails Bay and moored for over two years, where it was reportedly costing over $2,500 a day for maintenance and security. It was taken to Chowder Bay in early 2006 while authorities decided what to do with it.

Authorities eventually decided to scuttle the ship. On 23 March 2006, in a joint Royal Australian Air Force (RAAF) and Royal Australian Navy military exercise, the Pong Su was sunk by two GBU-10 Paveway II laser-guided bombs dropped from RAAF General Dynamics F-111C aircraft. The deliberate destruction of the freighter was said to deliver a strong message to international drug smuggling rings that the Australian Federal Police and Commonwealth Government would take all measures necessary to stop illegal drug importation.

Before the ship was scuttled, its radio was removed and donated to the Kurrajong Radio Museum.

== See also ==
- Australia–North Korea relations
- Fushin-sen
- Illegal drug trade
- Illicit activities of North Korea
