= Sydney Hilton Hotel bombing =

Terror attack in 1978 in Sydney, Australia

- The scene shortly after the bombing
- Location: 33°52′19″S 151°12′26″E; Hilton Hotel, George Street, Sydney, Australia
- Date: 13 February 1978; 12:40 am (UTC+11)
- Attack type: Bomb
- Deaths: 3
- Injuries: 9
- Perpetrators: Evan Pederick was tried, convicted and sentenced to 20 years imprisonment

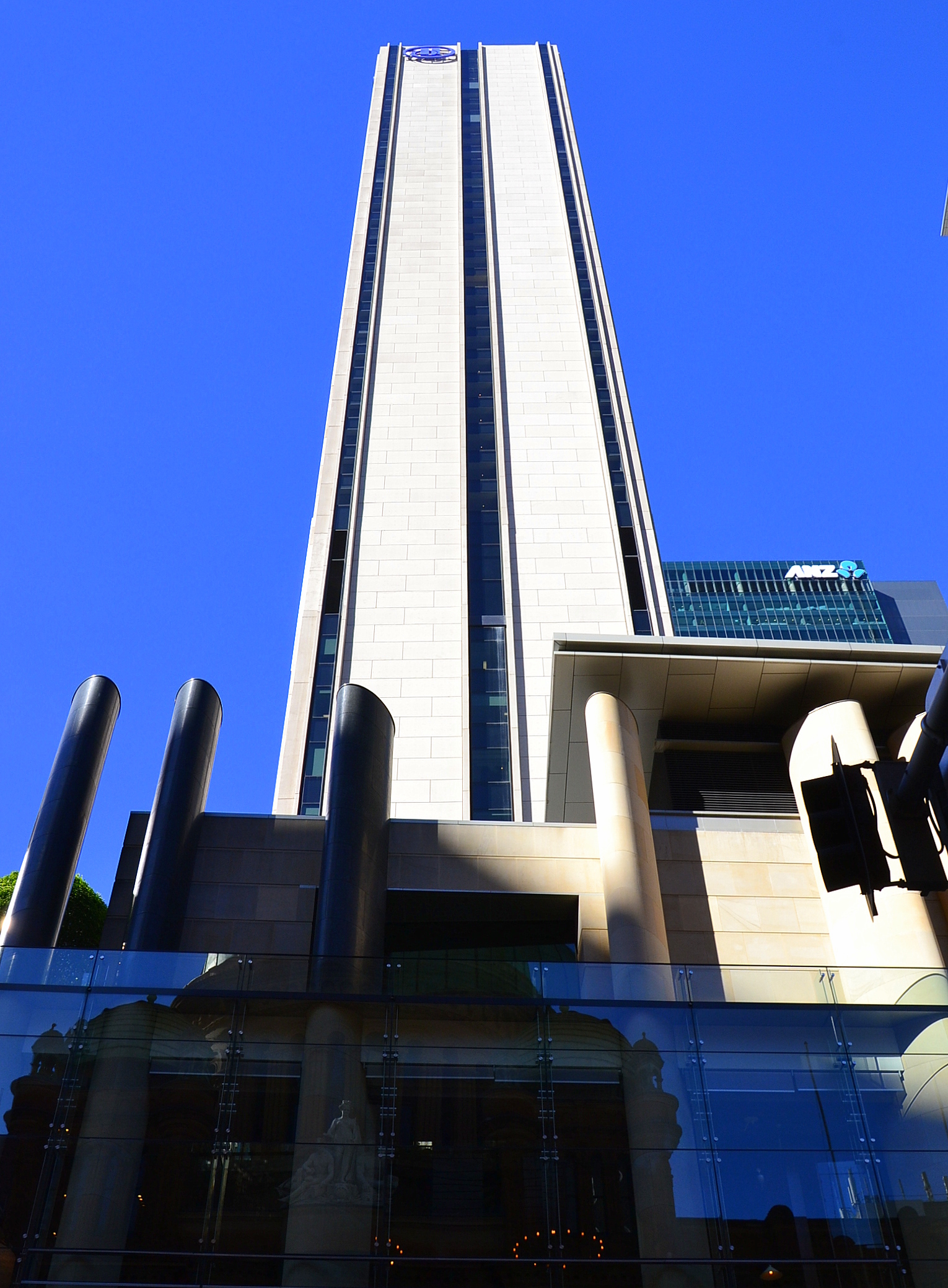
The side of the Sydney Hilton Hotel in 2013

The Sydney Hilton Hotel bombing occurred on 13 February 1978, when a bomb exploded outside the Hilton Hotel in George Street, Sydney, Australia. The hotel was hosting the first Commonwealth Heads of Government Regional Meeting (CHOGRM), a regional offshoot of the biennial meetings of the heads of government from across the Commonwealth of Nations.

The bomb was planted in a rubbish bin and exploded when the bin was emptied into a garbage truck outside the hotel at 12:40 a.m. It killed two men, Alec Raymond Carter and Arthur William Favell, the garbage collectors who picked up the bin. A police officer guarding the entrance to the hotel lounge, Paul Burmistriw, died later. It injured nine others. Twelve foreign leaders were staying in the hotel at the time, but none were injured. Australian prime minister Malcolm Fraser immediately deployed the Australian Army for the remainder of the CHOGRM meeting.

Eleven years later, on 31 May 1989, Evan Pederick, who in 1978 was a member of the radical socio-spiritual movement Ananda Marga walked into a Catholic church in Brisbane, confessed his guilt in the bombing to the parish priest, and subsequently turned himself in to the police. According to Pederick, he was recruited to assassinate the then prime minister of India, Morarji Desai, who was staying at the Hilton Hotel, attending a summit of Commonwealth Heads of Government. In September 1989, Pederick pleaded guilty and was sentenced to 20 years’ jail on three counts of murder and one of conspiracy. A month later, Tim Anderson, another Ananda Marga member named by Pederick as the mastermind of the bombing, was convicted of three counts of murder and then sentenced to 14 years. However, in June, 1991, the New South Wales Court of Criminal Appeal quashed Anderson’s conviction.

The Hilton case has been highly controversial due to allegations that Australian security forces, such as the Australian Security Intelligence Organisation (ASIO), may have been responsible. This led to the Parliament of New South Wales unanimously calling for the Commonwealth to hold an inquiry in 1991 and 1995.

The Hilton bombing was described in Parliament as the first domestic terrorist event in Australia.

Prior to the bombing, the security forces had been under considerable pressure. In South Australia, the White inquiry into their police special branch was very critical, and ties with ASIO were cut. New South Wales was about to have a similar inquiry. After the bombing, the NSW inquiry was never held, and the Commonwealth increased support for the anti-terrorism activities of the intelligence services.

Workers cleaning up after the bombing.

== Accusations of conspiracy ==
It has been asserted that there were a number of unusual circumstances, namely:

- At the 1983 Walsh Coronial Inquest, it was stated by Terry Griffiths and others that there was a continuous police presence outside the building since the previous morning. This may have prevented anyone placing a large bomb into the rubbish bin while the police were there.
- The 1995 ABC documentary Conspiracy showed the driver of the garbage truck, Bill Ebb, saying that the bins would normally be emptied several times each day, but police had prevented three earlier trucks from emptying the bin that contained the bomb, even though it was overflowing with rubbish.
- In 1991, John Hatton said in parliament that the garbage bin had not been searched for bombs and that searching bins is normally a high priority, and is specified in New South Wales police permanent circular 135.
- Army dog handler Keith Burley said that his dogs could smell very small quantities of explosives, and were expected to be used for the event. Burley said they were unexpectedly called off a few days prior without explanation.
- The entire truck and all bomb fragments were dumped immediately afterwards, at an unrecorded location. This prevented forensic evidence, such as the type of explosive used, from being gathered. Hatton compared that to the detailed evidence retrieved from the Pan Am Flight 103 that exploded at 30,000 feet.
- In 1983, William Reeve-Parker provided a statutory declaration that an army officer had admitted planting the bomb by switching rubbish bins 24 hours earlier. Reeve-Parker denied knowledge of who the officer was, although he "had helped his son". Reeve-Parker was never called as a witness at the coronial inquest.
- The officer-in-charge of police immediately after the bombing, Inspector Ian MacDonald, claimed there had been a cover-up.
- In 1995, Andrew Tink said that it had been alleged that former Attorney General of New South Wales Frank Walker and Federal Government Senator Gareth Evans had been told by a CSIRO scientist, that under pressure from ASIO they had made two fake bombs in the week prior to the bombing. The bombs were designed not to explode, but could do so in a garbage truck compactor.
- The principal private secretary of a federal senator was told that the bomb squad was waiting nearby at this early hour of the morning. Barry Hall QC said that this would make it hard to claim that they were not involved. The government did not permit people from the bomb squad to be called as witnesses to the inquest.
- Sgt Horton stated that he saw an occurrence pad entry, that showed the warning call was received at 12:32, 8 minutes before the bomb exploded. It was not relayed instantly to the police out front. At the inquest, four other versions of this pad were shown, each timing the call at 12:40.

Many of these issues were identified by Terry Griffiths, a former policeman who was seriously injured in the bombing, who had called for an inquiry. In 1995, Peter Collins, NSW Attorney General 1991–1992, said "The Hilton Bombing is a history of half truths, a litany of lies". In 1995, Barry Hall QC, counsel for Griffiths, argued that ASIO may well have planted the bomb in order to justify their existence.

The 1982 Walsh inquest was terminated prematurely, due to the finding of a prima facie case of murder.

== Arguments against a conspiracy ==
The then Indian prime minister Morarji Desai claimed that the Ananda Marga organisation had attempted to kill him, due to the imprisonment of the organisation's spiritual leader, Shrii Shrii Anandamurti. There had been other alleged attacks by Ananda Marga. On 15 September 1977, the military attaché at the Indian High Commission, Canberra, Colonel Singh and his wife, were attacked in Canberra. Just over a month later an Air India employee in Melbourne was stabbed. ASIO had infiltrated the Ananda Marga from 1976, and were monitoring it. In 1998, Ben Hills asserted that ASIO had information which would have helped in the police investigation, but withheld it.

In the 2016 publication, Who Bombed the Hilton?, film-maker Rachel Landers addressed the accusation that the bins outside the Hilton were left unemptied, with a bomb secreted inside one of them, as part of a conspiracy by Australian police or security agencies. Landers asserts: "An enormous number of people are free to shove any number of objects (including an enormous placard) into the bin, lean on it or use it as a convenient seat over a very long period of time. For the conspiracists to be correct, the following have to be lying in their statements: seven garbage men (including a street sweeper), an accountant, two hippies, a sign-writer, a father of two out for the day with his kids, an anarchist and the Hilton commissionaire. They also have to be colluding with each other, the police who have been told to wave away garbage trucks and, one assumes, ASIO and their mates at Special Branch."

In the 2019 book, The Hilton Bombing: Evan Pederick and the Ananda Marga, Imre Salusinszky gives a detailed account of Pederick's version of events and his confession to the bombing, and argues that "not a single shred of evidence has emerged to support any of the conspiracy theories about the Hilton bombing." He said "the official cover-up, if indeed there is one, has remained tight as a drum".

== Investigation ==
A few days after the bombing, Richard Seary offered his services to the police Special Branch as an informant. He expressed the view that the Ananda Marga society might be involved with the Hilton bombing. He soon infiltrated that organization, which had its headquarters in three adjacent houses in Queen Street, Newtown.

On 15 June 1978, Seary told Special Branch that members of Ananda Marga intended to bomb the home of Robert Cameron, a member of the far-right National Front of Australia, that night at his home in the Sydney suburb of Yagoona. Two members of the society — Ross Dunn and Paul Alister — were subsequently apprehended at Yagoona in Seary's company and charged with conspiracy to murder Robert Cameron.

It was alleged that Dunn and Alister had intended to plant a bomb at Cameron's home. Dunn and Alister stated that they intended only to write graffiti at Cameron's home and had no knowledge of the bomb, which they said had been brought by Seary. Seary having already given discredited evidence accusing Dunn and Alister at the initial Hilton bombing inquest, was considered an unreliable witness in the written judgement of the High Court in Alister v R (1984):

...Richard Seary, drug addict, informer and mentally disturbed fantasizer, must be one of the most unreliable persons ever presented as the principal prosecution witness on a charge of serious crime. The accused were entitled to refer to the fact that Seary had accused them of admitting the Hilton bombing. The accusation by Seary was made in circumstances which cast grave doubt upon his credibility. Seary claimed that Alister and Dunn made the admission to him in the car on the way to Cameron's house. However, in Seary's record of interview following the arrest at Yagoona, in which he set out the events, he made no reference to the Hilton bombing. If the admission had been made, Seary's failure to refer to it was extraordinary.

— Justice Murphy, Par 7, § "Improper Cross-Examination", Alister v R (1984)

However, there was also some police evidence, and the prosecution had strongly associated the matter with the Sydney Hilton bombing. The trial relating to the alleged plot to bomb Cameron's home began in February 1979, but the jury could not come to a verdict. A second trial was held in July, and all three defendants were convicted.

In 1982, a coronial inquest into the bombing was held. Stipendiary Magistrate Walsh found a prima facie case of murder against two members of Ananda Marga—Ross Dunn and Paul Alister, but not Tim Anderson—based on evidence from Richard Seary, which was later discredited.

Coronial inquiries are limited in their scope. No person appearing before the coroner has a right to subpoena evidence without permission from the coroner, and in this inquest Walsh rejected all applications.

In 1984, the Attorney-General, Paul Landa, established an inquiry to investigate the convictions of Dunn, Alister and Anderson. The inquiry was similar to a Royal Commission, and was headed by Justice Wood. Richard Seary was in England at the time and did not take part, but after the inquiry indicated that he was willing to take part. Justice Wood reconvened the inquiry and it ran through to February 1985. The result was that Justice Wood recommended the pardoning of the three, and they were released in 1985.

The inquiry did not directly cover the Hilton Bombing. The pardoned trio received compensation from the NSW Government. Alister ploughed his compensation money into land on Bridge Creek Road near Maleny, Queensland, which became his home, and the site of the Ananda Marga River School.

According to Paul Alister's later assertions, points that emerged during the inquiry included:

- Tapes of conversations between Richard Seary and his Special Branch contact showed that Seary had originally suggested that the Hare Krishna group might have been responsible for the Hilton bombing
- Police ignored the Hare Krishna suggestion and told Seary to spy on Ananda Marga.
- Seary infiltrated Ananda Marga one month later than he had originally stated in court.
- Seary knew how to obtain explosives illegally, although he had said in court that he did not.
- Seary had told police about the alleged Cameron bombing plan five days earlier than he originally stated.
- Dr Emanuel Fischer, who had done a psychiatric assessment of Seary, said he was schizoid and psychopathic.
- Seary's girlfriend Wendy, said that Seary had told her that he had thought they were going to Robert Cameron's house to put up posters, and he had been surprised that explosives were brought along.
- Wendy said that Seary had not volunteered to spy on Ananda Marga, but had been pressured by the police.
- Seary's friend Dok said that Seary had a plan to bomb an abattoir when he had been in the Hare Krishnas.

Paul Alister later speculated about Richard Seary's motives, saying he was a "wild card" because he seemed to have his own agenda. He stated that Seary seemed to have a mixture of motives for what he said, and seemed to dislike the police. Seary's girlfriend indicated that Seary had been pressured by the police to find evidence that incriminated the "Margiis". Alister and his colleagues speculated that perhaps Seary was being blackmailed into informing, because of his former activity as a drug addict. Seary had also been present when someone had died of a drug overdose. This may have given the police leverage over him, because he could be charged.

== The confession of Evan Pederick and trials ==
On 31 May 1989, Evan Pederick, who in 1978 was a member of Ananda Marga walked into a Catholic church in Brisbane, confessed his guilt in the bombing to the parish priest, and subsequently turned himself in to the police. According to Pederick, he was recruited to assassinate the then prime minister of India, Morarji Desai, who was staying at the Hilton Hotel, attending a summit of Commonwealth Heads of Government. Pederick claimed that Paul Anderson had planned the bombing. In September 1989, Pederick pleaded guilty and was sentenced to 20 years’ jail on three counts of murder and one of conspiracy.

A month later, Anderson was convicted of three counts of murder and then sentenced to 14 years. The crown prosecutor was Mark Tedeschi QC.

In 1989, Anderson was re-arrested for the Sydney Hilton bombing, tried, convicted and sentenced to fourteen years. However, in June, 1991, the New South Wales Court of Criminal Appeal quashed Anderson’s conviction.

Chief Justice Gleeson concluded:

... there was one important respect in which, in my view, the proceedings miscarried ... The Crown was permitted, in an unfair manner, to obscure a major difficulty concerning the reliability of the evidence of its principal witness ... by raising an hypothesis that was not reasonably open on the evidence ... a direction given by the learned trial judge to the jury relating to the "sanity" of Pederick ... constitutes an additional reason for treating the verdicts as unsafe and the process at the trial as unsatisfactory ... The trial of the appellant miscarried principally because of an error which resulted in large part from the failure of the prosecuting authorities adequately to check aspects of the Jayewardene theory. This was compounded by what I regard as an inappropriate and unfair attempt by the Crown to persuade the jury to draw inferences of fact, and accept argumentative suggestions, that were not properly open on the evidence. I do not consider that in those circumstances the Crown should be given a further opportunity to patch up its case against the appellant. It has already made one attempt too many to do that, and I believe that, if that attempt had never been made, there is a strong likelihood that the appellant would have been acquitted.

Instead of ordering a new trial, the Court entered a judgement of acquittal.

Pederick confessed to the bombing and so was convicted without detailed scrutiny of his confession. However, in the Anderson appeal, Chief Justice Gleeson said Pederick's account of the bombing was "clearly unreliable". He found: "On any view of the matter, his account of the events of 12 February 1978, and in particular of the circumstances relating to his actual attempt at assassination, is clearly unreliable. He is incapable of giving a description of those events which does not involve serious error."

Questions about Pederick's sanity were raised in the Anderson appeal. Gleeson criticised the trial judge's directions to the jury that Pederick must be assumed to be "sane". He described Pederick as "a witness who said that on a particular occasion he stood in George Street in Sydney and tried to blow up the Prime Minister of India, the Prime Minister of Australia, and a number of other people besides, and, when his attempt was unsuccessful, attributed its failure to the supernatural intervention of his guru". The Chief Justice added: "He seems to have been a person whose reasoning processes were somewhat unorthodox. There was a significant danger of confusing the jurors by telling them that the law presumed him to be sane".

Pederick unsuccessfully appealed his conviction in 1996, the year before his release. The appeal was rejected when he produced no evidence to explain why his original confession had been false. Pederick was released after serving eight years in jail and stated: "I guess I was quite unique in the prison system in that I had to keep proving my guilt, whereas everyone else said they were innocent."

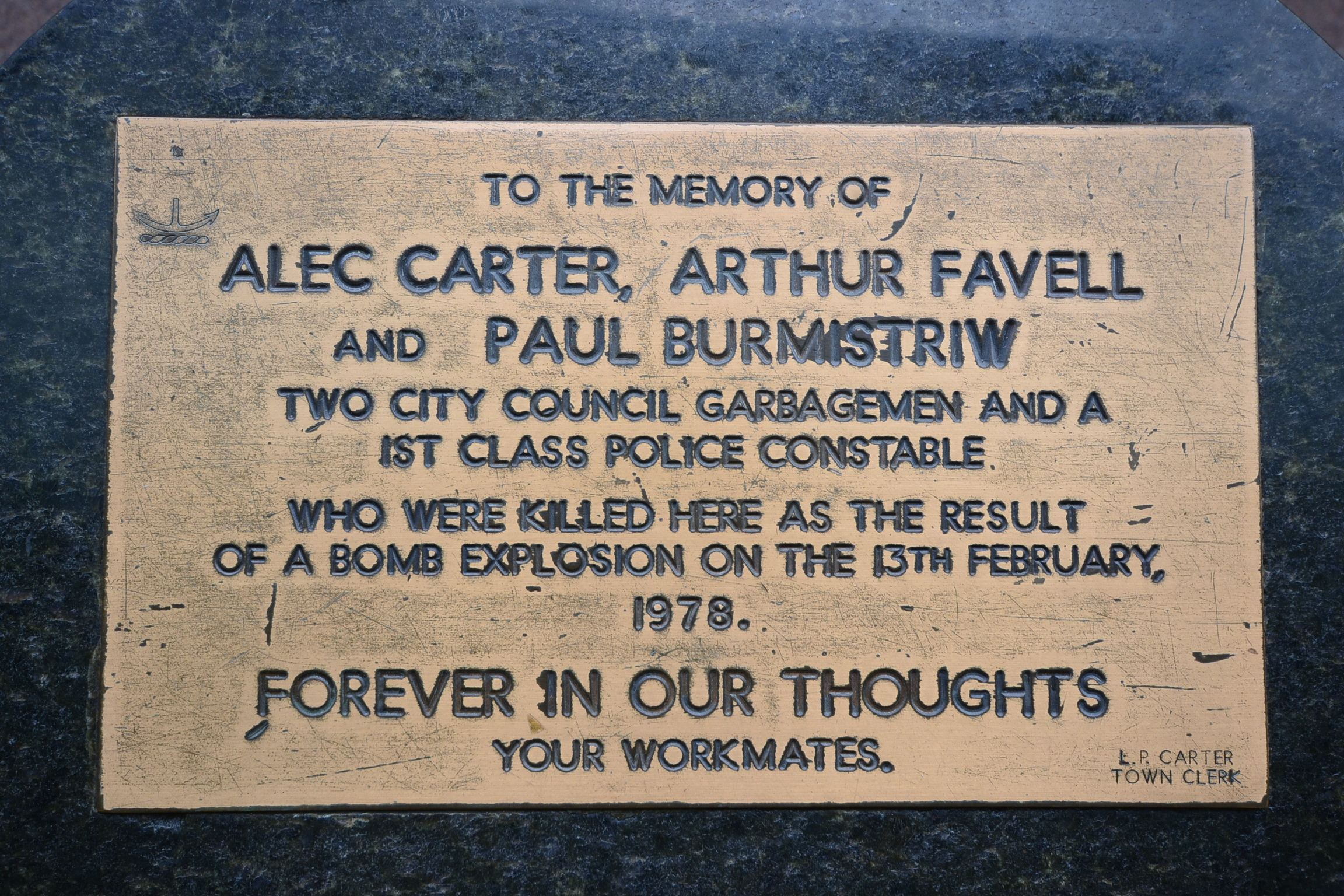
Plaque for victims of the bombing

The two failed prosecutions against Tim Anderson and his friends have been cited as instances of Australian miscarriages of justice. For example, in Kerry Carrington's 1991 book Travesty! Miscarriages of Justice, and in other law texts, including notes on compensation practice.

A plaque was unveiled at the site of the explosion in George Street on 13 February 2008, the 30th anniversary of the blast. The then-Premier of New South Wales, Morris Iemma, commended the City of Sydney Council for restoring the memorial plaque to its original home, and said he hoped there will never be a need for another.

== See also ==
- List of disasters in Australia by death toll
- Ananda Marga § Sydney Hilton bombing, includes brief mention of police informant, Richard John Seary

== Sources ==
=== Books ===
- Anderson, Tim (1992). Take two: The criminal justice system revisited. Sydney: Bantam. ISBN 1863590552. OCLC 154173679.

=== Journal articles ===
- Bolt, Steve; Mussett, Jane (1991). "The Tim Anderson Decision - The Chief Justice Cites the System". Legal Service Bulletin. 16: 126–127.
- Hoel, Adrian (May 2008). "Compensation for wrongful conviction". Trends and Issues in Crime and Criminal Justice (356). Canberra: Australian Institute of Criminology: 341–360. ISBN 978-1-921185-81-6. ISSN 0817-8542. Archived from the original on 6 June 2017.
- McClellan, Peter (December 2012). "A Matter of Fact: The Origins of the Court of Criminal Appeal". New South Wales Judicial Scholarship. 44. AustLII.edu.au. Remarks, at Centenary of the Court of Criminal Appeal, by the Hon Justice Peter McClellan AM, Chief Judge at Common Law, Supreme Court of NSW: [2012] NSWJSchol 44.
- "NSW Hansard". Parliament of New South Wales. 19 September 1995. (Search for "Hilton")

=== News reports and other media ===
- Dellora, Daryl (1995) Conspiracy: Produced by Film Art Doco for Australian Broadcasting Corporation, documentary (shown on True Stories series).
- Reviews of Dellora (1995) Conspiracy documentary:
  - Negus, George (2009) ABC George Negus discussion with Daryl Dellora.
  - Dixon, Norm (2008) Review of Dellora, Daryl and Ian Wansborough "The Hilton Bombing Revisited"
  - Freeman, Jane (6 February 1995) "The Hilton bombing" The Sydney Morning Herald
  - Head, Mike (13 February 2008) "30 years since Sydney's Hilton Hotel bombing—the unanswered questions" World Socialist [Website] (International Committee of the Fourth International (ICFI))
