= Tactical assault group =

Australian Defence Force special forces unit

A Tactical Assault Group (TAG) is an Australian Defence Force special forces unit tasked with responding as a counter-terrorism force to respond to terrorism incidents in Australia on land and maritime environments and also with conducting overseas special recovery operations.

At present there are two tactical assault groups based on opposite sides of the country. As such they are individually identified as being either TAG East, based in Sydney or TAG West, based in Perth. Both groups are structured to conduct offensive domestic counter-terrorist operations focusing on direct action and hostage recovery.

Each assault group maintains a short notice capability to conduct military operations beyond the scope of State and Federal Police Tactical Groups. These aims are achieved through various highly specialised skill sets, niche capabilities and supporting Australian Defence Force (ADF) units such as those from the Special Operations Engineer Regiment and 171st Special Operations Aviation Squadron.

== History ==
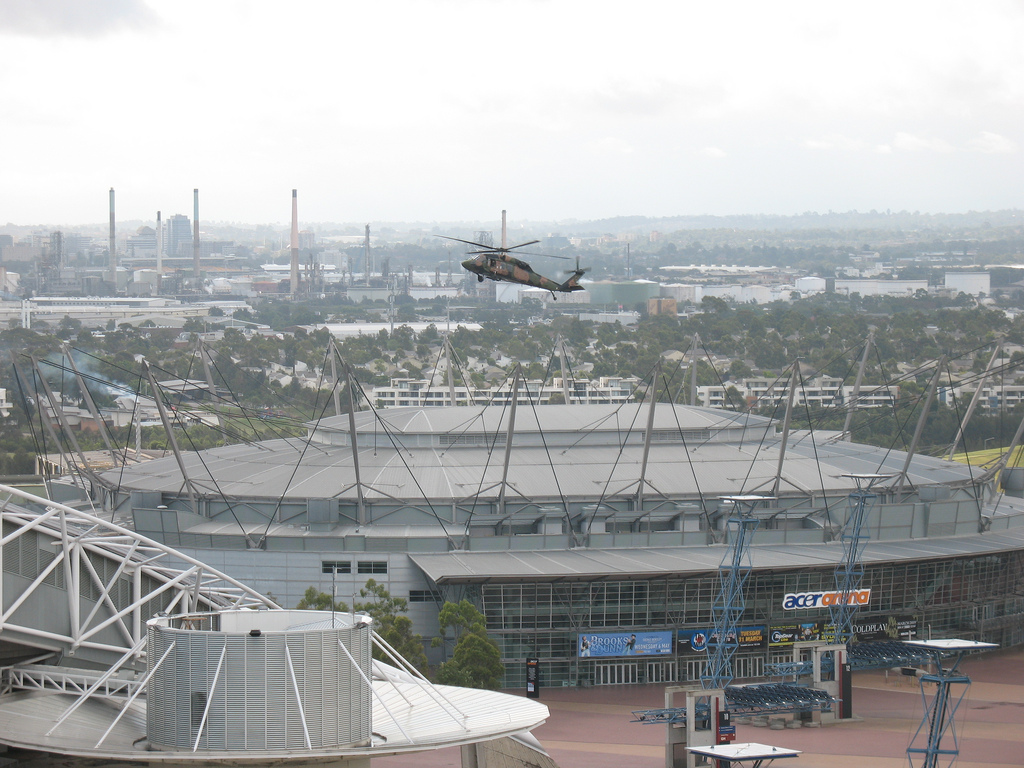
An Army Black Hawk helicopter simulating counter-terrorism scenarios at Sydney Olympic Park, 2008.

The Sydney Hilton bombing on 13 February 1978 was the catalyst for the Commonwealth Government to initiate an urgent review of security procedures to combat the threat of international terrorism.

The anti-terrorist agencies (the Australian Federal Police and the Australian Security Intelligence Organisation) were placed on heightened alert and a Protective Security Coordination Centre was established. The Prime Minister proposed the establishment of a Standing Advisory Committee on Commonwealth State Cooperation for Protection against Violence, which would be primarily responsible for the coordination and funding of various organisations involved. He also directed that police forces around Australia absorb the counter-terrorist role. However, a study by Sir Robert Mark, at that time recently retired from the London Metropolitan Police, concluded that this was a task for 'sophisticated soldiery' and should not be given to the police but rather to the Army. Sir Robert's advice was further strengthened by the Ironbark Report, written by Colonel John Essex-Clark, in which he advised the urgent formation of a special counter-terrorist force within the Army.

In August 1978, it was proposed to allocate the task of raising, training and sustaining the counter-terrorist force to the Special Air Service Regiment to follow similar lines from the British Army with their counter-terrorist team from within their SAS. The force was to be called the TAG and was to be commanded by the Commanding Officer SASR. On 3 May 1979, the Government approved the raising of a dedicated counter-terrorist force in the SASR, with final authorisation to raise the TAG given on 31 August 1979.

The tasks allocated to the group included:

- The neutralisation, including capture, of terrorist groups, which might include snipers, hijackers, kidnappers, bombers or assassins, and the neutralisation of aircraft or ships;
- The recovery of hostages and property held by terrorists; and
- The recovery of buildings and installations held by terrorists.

The training began officially in March 1980 and the force became fully operational in the following May. In July 1980, the SASR was directed to develop an offshore (maritime) capability, concerned primarily with retaking Bass Strait oil rigs in the event of terrorist capture. These operations were to be handled by a dedicated water operations team which included 17 Clearance Divers from the RAN's Clearance Diving Branch, who were placed under operational control of the SASR from 4 August 1980 as part of the TAG.

TAG (East) was raised on 22 July 2002 in order to increase the ADF's domestic counter-terrorist capability. TAG (East) mirrors the original Tactical Assault Group, which was redesignated TAG (West). The dual basing enables the ADF to readily respond to simultaneous and geographically separate domestic incidents.

== Organisation ==
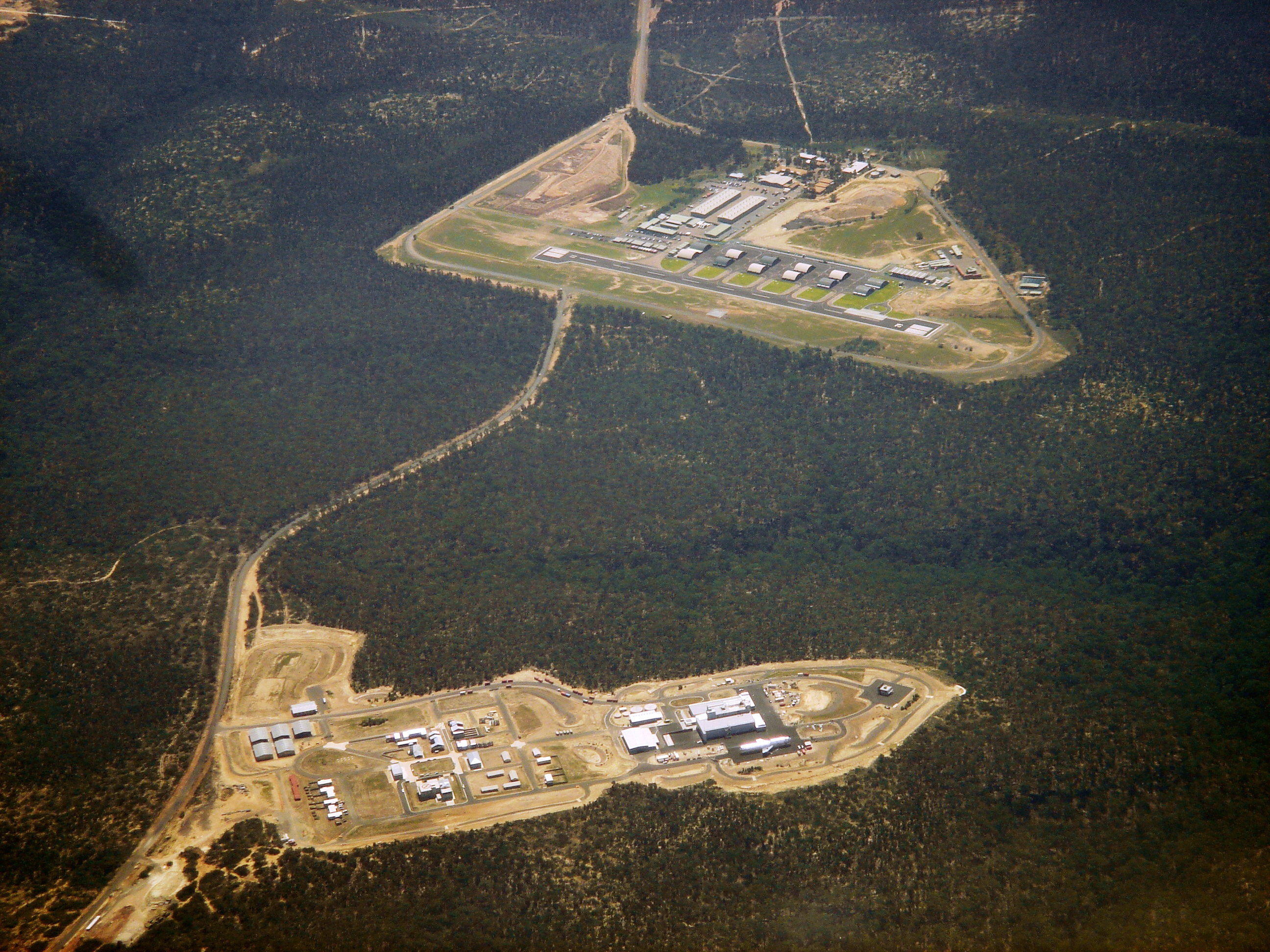
TAG East facilities in Sydney. At bottom: shown are MOUT ranges, shoot houses and mock aircraft. Top: facilities belonging to the 171st Aviation Squadron

At present there are two tactical assault groups, TAG East and TAG West. Each belongs to a different parent unit and each protect a different domestic geographical area of Australia.

TAG East draws its members from the 2nd Commando Regiment, and rotates one company through the role for a pre-determined length of time. It is also supplemented with personnel from the Royal Australian Navy's Clearance Diving Branch. The Royal Australian Navy component consists of an operations officer, a clearance diver (CD) assault platoon, and an underwater medic. Approximately 30 Clearance Divers are permanently attached to the group at any one time.

TAG West draws its members from the Special Air Service Regiment and rotates one squadron through the role for a pre-determined length of time.

Both have world-class training facilities including advanced outdoor close-quarters battle ranges, MOUT villages, urban CT complexes, full-size aircraft mock-ups, and sniper ranges.

Both participate in NATEX (national anti-terrorism exercises). Several times each year, exercises are conducted to test elements of the Australian Defence Force including the two tactical assault groups, Special Operations Command (Australia) and the Special Operations Engineer Regiment. The exercises also involve relevant components of state and territory police forces, such as police tactical groups and intelligence agencies such as ASIO. TAG-West conducts annual training courses for police tactical group members from each state and territory. Each year as part of the National Counter-Terrorist Committee Skills Enhancement Course, each state and territory sends several members of its PTG to participate in a concentrated three-week course to strengthen standards of policing in urban counter-terrorist tactics and ensure all states are training consistently to the same codes and standards of counter-terrorism.

== Operations ==
- 1982 Brisbane Commonwealth Games
- 2000 Sydney Olympics Security: Joint Task Force Gold
- 2001 South Tomi boarding
- 2001 MV Tampa boarding: (see Tampa affair).
- 2003 Pong Su boarding
- 2003 Rugby World Cup: Operation Scrummage
- 2006 Melbourne Commonwealth Games: Operation Acolyte
- 2007 Sydney APEC Conference: Operation Deluge
- 2008 World Youth Day Sydney and visit of Pope Benedict XVI: Operation Testament
- 2014 G-20 Brisbane summit
- 2016 Kaiyo Maru No. 8 boarding

On 12 April 2001, an SASR troop conducted a boarding of the fishing vessel South Tomi using two RHIBs launched from the South African Navy vessel SAS Protea in international waters 260 nautical miles (480 km; 300 mi) south of Cape Agulhas, South Africa. The South Tomi had fled the AFMA fisheries patrol vessel Southern Supporter after being detected poaching Patagonian toothfish near Heard Island and McDonald Islands in the Southern Ocean.

On 20 April 2003, members from both Tactical Assault Group West and Tactical Assault Group East combined to board the Pong Su, a 4,000 ton North Korean ocean freighter in Australian territorial waters. The ship was flying the flag of Tuvalu at the time, known as flying a flag of convenience. The boarding of the freighter was carried whilst the ship was underway in rough seas. The reason for apprehending the ship was that it was suspected of being involved in smuggling almost 125 kg (300 pounds) of heroin into Australia.

On 12 December 2016, Tactical Assault Group members from TAG EAST conducted a boarding of the 50m former Japanese whaling vessel Kaiyo Maru No. 8 (KM8) in international waters in the Southern Ocean south east of Tasmania after it was intercepted by HMAS Adelaide. The vessel had been monitored by Maritime Border Command loitering and circling more than 200 nautical miles off the southern coast of Australia and was suspected to be involved in drug smuggling. Details of the boarding were not released by Defence but by law enforcement, however, imagery released by Defence shows TAG members in Air Drop Rigid Hull Inflatable Boat (ADRHIB) deploying from Adelaide. Tactical Assault Group members discovered 186 kilograms of cocaine worth $60 million on board KM8 with ten crew members nine from China and one from Singapore detained. Adelaide had been in the area taking part in Exercise Ocean Raider 2016.

== See also ==
- Special Operations Command (Australia)
- Clearance Diving Branch (RAN)
- Special Air Service Regiment
- 2nd Commando Regiment (Australia)
- 1st Commando Regiment (Australia)
- Police Tactical Group
