= Parachute Training and Support Unit =

New Zealand military unit

Royal New Zealand Parachute Training and Support Unit
- Active: 1964–present
- Country: New Zealand
- Branch: Royal New Zealand Air Force
- Role: Parachute Training and Operational Support

The Parachute Training and Support Unit is a unit of the Royal New Zealand Air Force based at RNZAF Base Auckland. The unit provides training and operational parachuting support to the New Zealand Defence Force, particularly the NZDF Special Operations Forces. The unit provides instruction in parachuting techniques, parachute dispatch, and support of high-altitude military parachuting. Personnel from the unit also form the RNZAF's Kiwi Blue Parachute Display Team.

== History ==
New Zealand military parachuting predates the unit's establishment. In the 1950s, members of the New Zealand Special Air Service (NZSAS) first received static-line parachute instruction from British instructors while based in Singapore. From 1960 to 1964, New Zealand military parachute training was undertaken at the Paratroop Training Wing with the Royal Australian Air Force at RAAF Base Williamstown. The Auckland Parachute Club also assisted with free-fall and static parachuting instruction.

The Parachute Training Unit was raised at Whenuapai in March 1964; its first Officer Commanding was Flying Officer Bob Davidson. It was renamed the Para-drop Training Unit in 1965, then became the Parachute Training and Support Unit in 1967. From there, the unit was mandated to support parachute training across all three services of the New Zealand Defence Force; training included Emergency Parachute Training for Royal New Zealand Air Force and Royal New Zealand Navy aircrew, Conventional Static-line Parachuting, Specialised Free Fall parachuting, and support for the New Zealand Army's airborne capability.

Douglas C-47/DC-3 Dakota NZ3547 returned to flying duty with the RNZAF in October 1966 after earlier service with the New Zealand National Airways Corporation. The airframe was configured for paradrop and delivered to No. 42 Squadron RNZAF in July 1967. PTSU used it as an operational airframe, informally known as "Para-Dak"; it continued service until 1977.

Post-war RNZAF modernisation and development included procuring the C-130H(NZ), which gave the NZDF long-range parachute capability; the first airframe entered service in 1965. The Hercules subsequently became associated with parachute operations, including HALO training during Exercise Silver Wing in May 2024.

PTSU maintains links and alliances with foreign military parachuting organisations. Since the 1980s, exchanges have occurred regularly with the Singapore Armed Forces; the unit has also conducted training serials with the Australian Army's Parachute Training School, including exercises such as Tasman Canopy. PTSU has undertaken training with United States Military aircrews and assisted the Royal Air Force in developing high-altitude parachuting procedures.

== Organisation ==
An RNZAF officer commands PTSU; its instructor cadre includes Parachute Jump Instructors (PJI). PJIs instruct ground schooling, parachute instruction, jump dispatch and safety functions.

RNZAF Safety and Service Technicians conduct parachute maintenance, servicing and packing of canopies in the parachute bay of the Maintenance Support Squadron (MSS) on RNZAF Base Auckland. Qualified PJIs are instructed in parachute packing and may pack canopies in extremis. Together, PTSU and MSS personnel are closely associated elements of the RNZAF parachute capability, while operating under separate chains of command.

=== Capability ===
PTSU delivers static-line, free-fall and advanced military parachute training. The RNZAF uses MC-6 personnel parachute and SOV3-TS tandem parachute. The SOV3-TS can carry two parachutists with a full equipment loadout. Previous parachute systems in use by PTSU include Talon and Telesis systems.

Current capability and operational outputs include:

- Basic ram-air static-line parachuting
- Low-level static-line parachuting
- Military free-fall
- Advanced free-fall
- Parachute dispatcher training
- Emergency parachute training
- Day and Night parachuting
- Water parachute operations
- Remote and austere drop zones
- HALO
- HAHO

RNZAF PJIs train NZDF personnel to conduct jumps from 800 to 13,000 feet (244 and 3,962 metres). The RNZAF states that high-altitude parachuting can go beyond this range, depending on the type of jump and equipment used. Because PTSU does not have a dedicated military aircraft fleet, it uses No. 40 Squadron C-130J-30 Super Hercules and No. 3 Squadron NH-90s. To address operational airframe gaps, PTSU regularly contracts Cessna C-208B Caravan aircraft for parachute training sorties.

=== Kiwi Blue Parachute Display Team ===
Kiwi Blue is the Royal New Zealand Air Force's parachute demonstration and display team, made up of PTSU members. The team performs parachute displays, open days, commemorative and other public events. In this role, Kiwi Blues' function is secondary to PTSU's primary responsibilities: operational support and parachute training.

The team has performed internationally, including in the United Kingdom and Australia. In 2008, on Anzac Day, team members performed a display at the Melbourne Cricket Ground (MCG) with the Australian Army's Red Berets parachute display team.
