= Airborne forces of Australia =

Ground forces dropped by parachute

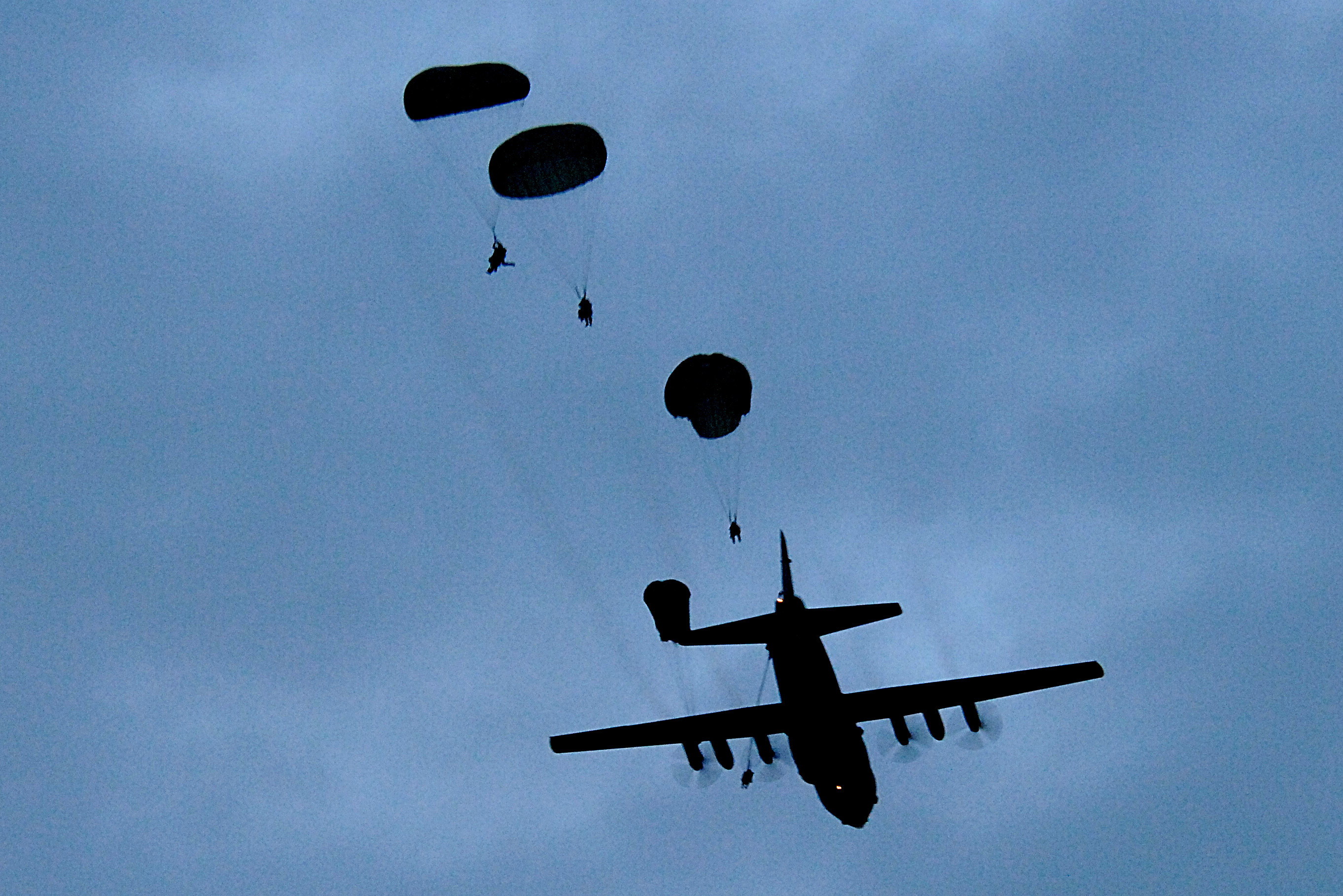
Soldiers from Reconnaissance Platoon, 3 RAR during exercise Talisman Sabre 2007

Airborne forces raised by Australia have included a number of conventional and special forces units. During the Second World War the Australian Army formed the 1st Parachute Battalion; however, it did not see action. In the post-war period Australia's parachute capability was primarily maintained by special forces units. In the early 1980s a parachute infantry capability was revived which led to the Parachute Battalion Group forming in 1983 based on the 3rd Battalion, Royal Australian Regiment (3 RAR). In 1997, a full time commando regiment was raised that was able to conduct large-scale operations which matured during the 2000s. In 2011, 3 RAR relinquished the parachute role, with the commando regiment conducting a large-scale parachute capability.

== History ==
Like the British Army, Australia did not have a parachute operations capability at the outbreak of the Second World War; however, the demonstration of the effectiveness of such forces by the Germans in the early stages of the conflict soon provided the impetus for their development. In November 1942 the Paratroop Training Unit (PTU) was formed in the Royal Australian Air Force (RAAF), while approval was granted for the establishment of the 1st Parachute Battalion in August 1943. Later, a specialised airborne artillery battery and engineer troop were also raised, to support the 1st Parachute Battalion on operations.

However, the first Australian Army personnel to complete an operational jump were members of 54 Battery, 2/4th Field Regiment; on 5 September 1943, these artillerymen, with negligible parachute training, jumped with their guns to support US parachute infantry during the Landing at Nadzab.

Members of Z Special Unit were also trained in parachuting for covert operations against the Japanese. The PTU also developed techniques for the aerial delivery of stores. Z Special Unit teams were parachuted into the interior of Borneo during 1945 as part of the preparations for the Australian-led Borneo Campaign.

The 1st Parachute Battalion reached full strength by January 1944, but, although it was warned for action a number of times, including the possible rescue of prisoners of war held at Sandakan in 1945, it did not see any fighting. After the war it participated in the reoccupation of Singapore, before being disbanded in early 1946.

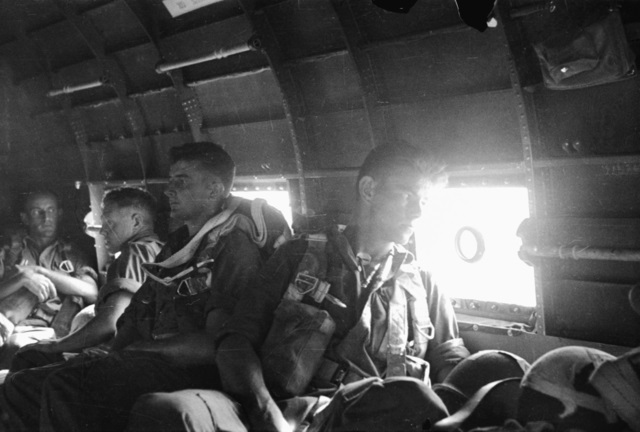
2/4th Field Regiment gunners shortly before they participated in the parachute landing at Nadzab

Initially, no requirement to maintain airborne forces in the immediate post-war period was foreseen. In September 1951 a joint RAAF/Army unit, the Parachute Training Wing (PTW) was formed at RAAF Station Williamtown under the control of the RAAF as part of the School of Land/Air Warfare (SLAW). The PTW was responsible for all parachute training for Army, Navy and Air Force personnel, with the first course commencing in September 1951. In October 1951, an Airborne Platoon was formed from 2 RAR attached to SLAW, although it had no operational role, the platoon was responsible for developing parachute techniques, demonstrations, assisting civil authorities with natural disasters, search and rescue and firefighting. In January 1953, the platoon became an independent Army unit attached to SLAW.

In the mid-1950s, a parachute capability was developed by special forces units, with two Army Reserve Commando Companies formed in 1955 (later placed into a regiment in 1981) and the 1st Special Air Service Company was formed in 1957 (expanded to form the Special Air Service Regiment (SASR) in 1964). In August 1958, SLAW was disbanded and the Air Support Unit (ASU) was formed with the PTW renamed the Parachute Training Flight (PTF) and the Airborne Platoon attached to the PTF. Although during the Vietnam War the primary method of insertion used by the SASR was by helicopter, 3 Squadron made an operational parachute jump 5 kilometres (3.1 mi) north west of Xuyen Moc on 15–16 December 1969.

In May 1974, the Army took over responsibility for parachute training from the RAAF, with the PTF renamed the Parachute Training School (PTS) . The Airborne Platoon became a sub-unit of the PTS and was re-roled to assist with training. Meanwhile, a new commanding officer of 6 RAR commenced in April 1974 and sought to revive a parachute infantry capability assuming an unofficial parachute role and formed an airborne company group for Exercise Strikemaster in September 1974 in the short-lived role.

In 1980, the Army formally revived a parachute infantry capability with 'D' Company of 6 RAR reorganised as a parachute company group. Moves then began to develop an airborne battalion, with the 3rd Battalion, Royal Australian Regiment (3 RAR) selected for this role in 1983. Based at Holsworthy Barracks in Sydney, 3 RAR subsequently formed the basis of the Parachute Battalion Group, which also included an engineer troop, signals detachment, artillery battery, and medical support, including a parachute surgical team. In 1997, a full-time commando unit was formed based on the 4th Battalion, Royal Australian Regiment (later renamed to 2nd Commando Regiment). In September 1999, 3 RAR deployed to East Timor as part of INTERFET, although not in the parachute role. The battalion helped secure Dili during the early stages of the operation, before conducting patrols along the West Timor border and later secured the Oecussi Enclave. The bulk of the battalion returned to Australia in February 2000. In April 2002, 3 RAR returned to East Timor as part of UNTAET and UNMISET. 4 RAR (Cdo) provided the parachute capability whilst 3 RAR completed a six month tour.

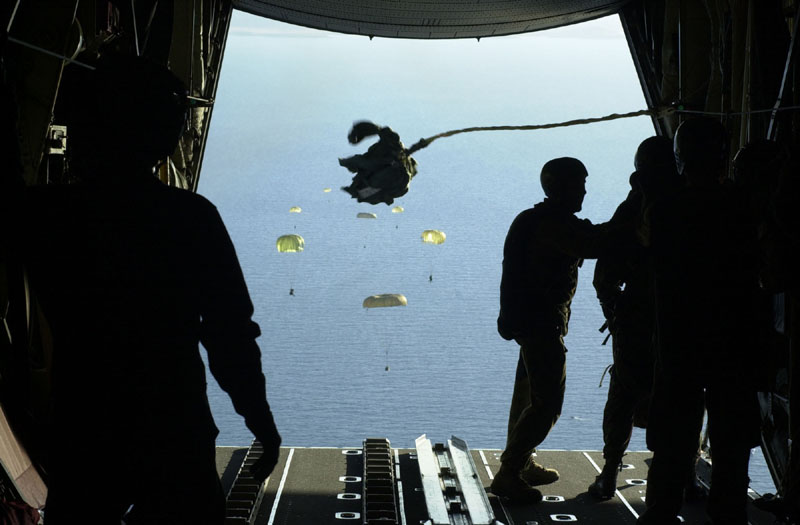
Soldiers from the 1st Commando Company parachute with their inflatable boats from an RAAF C-130H into Shoalwater Bay

As part of the "Hardening and Networking the Army" initiative in 2006 it was announced that 3 RAR would be reorganised as a light infantry battalion. Meanwhile, the battalion or its sub-units subsequently served multiple operational tours in East Timor, the Solomon Islands, Iraq and Afghanistan. 3 RAR subsequently relinquished the parachute role to provide the Army with greater flexibility to develop an amphibious infantry battalion. On 26 August 2011, the Chief of Army transferred responsibility for maintaining the Army's parachute capability from Forces Command to Special Operations Command. There was opposition to the Army losing a conventional parachute capability.

A large-scale parachute capability is now provided by the 2nd Commando Regiment. In November 2019, the PTS was renamed the Australian Defence Force Parachuting School. Other units from Special Operations Command, including the SASR and the reserve 1st Commando Regiment, also maintain a range of parachute capabilities and Combat Controllers from the Air Force's B Flight, No. 4 Squadron. These forces are supported by the Parachuting School located at Nowra since 1986, parachute riggers from the Royal Australian Army Ordnance Corps and an air dispatch squadron provided by the Royal Australian Corps of Transport. The Parachuting School has an Army Parachute Display Team known as "The Red Berets".

== Badges and attire ==
There are five different parachute badges worn by qualified personnel in the Army, three of which are regiment specific (3 RAR, commando regiments, and SASR), in addition to the standard Army parachute badge, and one for parachute jump instructors. A maroon or dull cherry beret is also worn by airborne personnel (3 RAR prior to being re-rolled as light infantry, as well as parachute riggers and air dispatch personnel that are parachute-qualified). During the Second World War members of the 1st Parachute Battalion also wore the dull cherry beret, which they adopted from airborne units of the British Army. A range of cloth parachute badges were also worn by trained parachutists, including those of the 1st Parachute Battalion and its supporting arms (artillery and engineers), as well as the Services Reconnaissance Department (Z Special Unit) and the 1st Australian Parachute Training Depot (Army Wing).
