= Alan Rawlinson =

Australian fighter pilot (1918–2007)

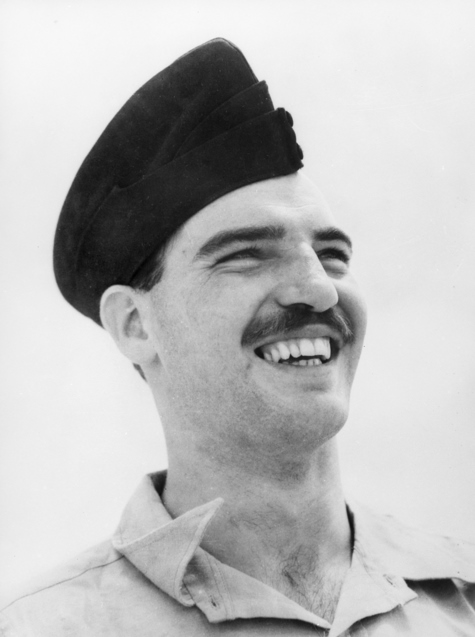
- Flight Lieutenant Rawlinson in Palestine, June 1941
- Born: 31 July 1918; Fremantle, Western Australia
- Died: 27 August 2007 (aged 89); Naracoorte, South Australia
- Military career
- Allegiance: Australia; United Kingdom
- Branch: Royal Australian Air Force (1938–46); Royal Air Force (1947–61)
- Service years: 1938–61
- Rank: Group Captain
- Units: No. 3 Squadron RAAF (1939–41); No. 2 OTU RAAF (1942); RAF Odiham Wing (1949–52)
- Commands: No. 79 Squadron RAAF (1943); Paratroop Training Unit RAAF (1944–45); No. 78 Wing RAAF (1945–46); No. 54 Squadron RAF (1949); RAF Guided Weapons Trials Unit (1953–58); RAF Buchan (1960–61)
- Conflicts: World War II; Middle Eastern theatre; Western Desert campaign; Syria–Lebanon campaign; South West Pacific theatre; New Guinea campaign; Borneo campaign; Cold War
- Awards: Officer of the Order of the British Empire; Distinguished Flying Cross & Bar; Air Force Cross

Alan Charles Rawlinson, OBE, DFC & Bar, AFC (31 July 1918 – 27 August 2007) was an Australian airman who became a fighter ace in World War II. He was credited with at least eight aerial victories, as well as two aircraft probably destroyed, and another eight damaged.

Born in Fremantle, Western Australia, Rawlinson joined the Royal Australian Air Force (RAAF) in 1938. He was posted to the Middle East in July 1940 and saw action with No. 3 (Army Cooperation) Squadron, flying Gloster Gladiator and Gauntlet biplanes initially, and later Hawker Hurricanes and P-40 Tomahawks. Twice credited with shooting down three enemy aircraft in a single sortie, he was awarded the Distinguished Flying Cross (DFC) in October 1941 and took command of No. 3 Squadron the next month. He received a bar to his DFC in December 1941, and returned to Australia in March 1942. In May the following year, Rawlinson was posted to the South West Pacific as the inaugural commanding officer of No. 79 Squadron, flying Supermarine Spitfires in New Guinea. After serving as commanding officer of the RAAF's Paratroop Training Unit at Richmond, New South Wales, between April 1944 and May 1945, he returned to the Pacific to command No. 78 (Fighter) Wing, which operated P-40 Kittyhawks in Borneo. Promoted to acting group captain in July 1945, he held command of No. 78 Wing until his discharge from the RAAF in December 1946.

Rawlinson was commissioned into the Royal Air Force (RAF) in March 1947. He flew de Havilland Vampire jet fighters as commanding officer of No. 54 Squadron in 1949, and then as commander of flying operations at RAF Odiham from 1949 to 1952. He was awarded the Air Force Cross in June 1952. Between 1953 and 1958 he was in charge of the RAF's Guided Weapons Trials Unit in the UK and Australia. Appointed an Officer of the Order of the British Empire in June 1958, he commanded RAF Buchan in 1960–61 before retiring from the military to live in South Australia.

== Early life ==
Alan Charles Rawlinson was born on 31 July 1918 in Fremantle, Western Australia. He was the son of Arthur Rawlinson, who played for East Fremantle in the West Australian Football League. The Rawlinson family was among the earliest residents of Beaconsfield, and gave its name to a street in O'Connor. Moving to Melbourne when he was eight years old, Alan was educated at Geelong Road State School in Footscray and at Williamstown High School, representing both schools in football, swimming and athletics. Before leaving high school with his Intermediate Certificate, he joined the East Melbourne Harriers' Club, becoming its 1935–36 season champion.

Rawlinson was living in the Melbourne suburb of Ivanhoe and had been working as a clerk for two-and-a-half years when he joined the Royal Australian Air Force (RAAF) on 19 July 1938. He underwent flying instruction as an air cadet at No. 1 Flying Training School, Point Cook, and was granted a short-service commission as a pilot officer on probation from 22 June 1939. On 7 July he was posted to No. 3 (Army Cooperation) Squadron, which operated Hawker Demon biplane fighters out of RAAF Station Richmond, New South Wales. He spent much of the remainder of the year learning instrument flying on the Link Trainer, and undertaking a parachute training course.

== World War II ==
=== Middle East ===
==== Western Desert campaign ====
In April 1940, the RAAF confirmed Rawlinson's appointment as a pilot officer and his promotion to temporary flying officer backdated to 22 November 1939. He was posted in July 1940 to the Middle East with No. 3 Squadron, which was to support the 6th Division in the Western Desert campaign against Italian forces. Sailing via Bombay, the squadron arrived in Suez, Egypt, on 23 August 1940. The next month it was equipped with a flight of Westland Lysander high-wing monoplane reconnaissance aircraft and two flights of Gloster Gladiator biplane fighters, augmented by four Gloster Gauntlet biplanes to be used for dive bombing; Rawlinson initially trained on the Gauntlet.

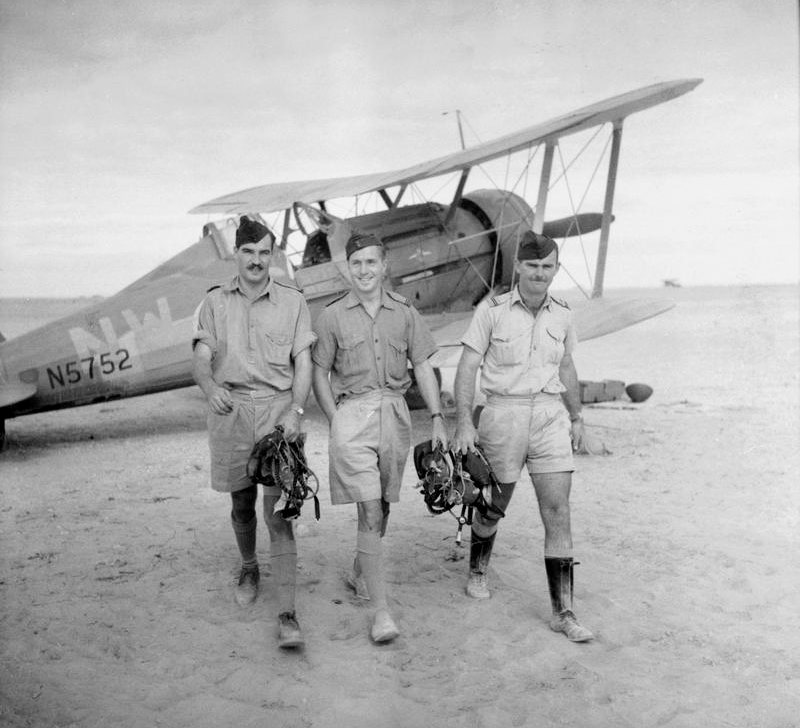
Flying Officers Rawlinson (left) and Boyd (right) with Flight Lieutenant Pelly and a Gladiator biplane, after No. 3 Squadron's first combat on 19 November 1940

Rawlinson took part in No. 3 Squadron's first aerial combat on 19 November 1940. Flying a Gladiator, he was one of three pilots escorting Flight Lieutenant Blake Pelly on a reconnaissance mission when they were engaged by eighteen Italian Fiat CR.42 biplanes near Rabia in western Egypt. The Australians claimed six CR.42s destroyed for the loss of one Gladiator. Rawlinson has been variously credited with one CR.42 destroyed, one probably destroyed, or one damaged. According to his biographer Lex McAulay, Rawlinson believed he destroyed a CR.42 in a head-on attack but did not see it crash, so his claim was downgraded to "damaged". He flew Gauntlets on dive-bombing missions in December; the type was withdrawn from service mid-month.

On 22 December 1940, as the Allies advanced along the Libyan coast to Bardia, Rawlinson's rank of flying officer was made substantive; it was the highest permanent rank he received during the war. Four days later, he was in a formation of eight Gladiators that attacked ten Savoia-Marchetti SM.79 bombers and their escort of twenty-four CR.42s; the Australians claimed two CR.42s destroyed, and five damaged including one probably destroyed, which was credited to Rawlinson. On 22 January 1941, Rawlinson and Flying Officer Wilfred Arthur were despatched in Gladiators to attack an Italian schooner off Tobruk; they machine-gunned the vessel, setting it on fire. Three days later, Rawlinson claimed two Fiat G.50 fighters damaged after five of the Italian monoplanes attacked five Gladiators patrolling near Mechili. He was notified of his promotion to temporary flight lieutenant, effective from New Year's Day, on 27 January.

No. 3 Squadron began re-arming with Hawker Hurricane fighters on 29 January 1941, and Rawlinson started his conversion on 3 February. A week later, the squadron moved to RAF Station Benina to take over the air defence of Benghazi, which had been occupied by the 6th Division. German aircraft began appearing at this time, as the Afrika Korps and a Luftwaffe contingent under General Erwin Rommel arrived in North Africa to reinforce the Italians; the Germans launched their offensive in March, and Benina was evacuated on 3 April. The same day, Rawlinson was credited with shooting down three German Junkers Ju 87 Stuka dive bombers, and damaging another, during a single sortie in his Hurricane.

==== Syria–Lebanon campaign and return to Western Desert ====
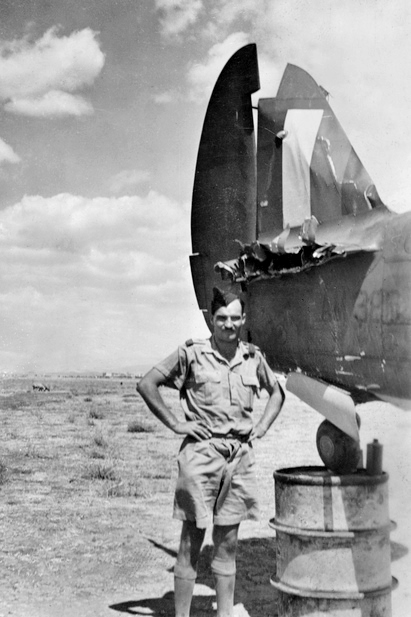
Flight Lieutenant Rawlinson with his damaged Tomahawk fighter Sweet FA on 22 August 1941

As the Allies retreated, No. 3 Squadron transferred to Lydda in Palestine, and began re-equipping with P-40 Tomahawks on 14 May. Rawlinson was appointed a flight commander the same month. He became an ace during the Syria–Lebanon campaign against the Vichy French in June–July 1941. On 28 June, he was leading a patrol of nine Tomahawks near Palmyra that came upon six French Martin 167 bombers, and shot down all six; Rawlinson was credited with three victories, raising his total to six. The squadron remained in Syria following the armistice with the French on 14 July. Rawlinson was allocated a new Tomahawk, nicknamed Sweet FA, which he shared with another No. 3 Squadron ace, Peter Turnbull. On 22 August, Rawlinson was practising aerobatics in Sweet FA when the right tailplane detached, damaging the tailfin in the process; he could only control the aircraft by flying at 150 miles per hour (240 km/h) but was able to bring it in for a landing, without flaps, at the higher-than-normal speed.

No. 3 Squadron transferred to Sidi Haneish in Egypt on 3 September 1941, to resume operations in the Western Desert. On 10 October, Rawlinson was awarded the Distinguished Flying Cross (DFC) for leading his flight with "determination and daring, pressing home attacks at close range"; the citation noted his six confirmed aerial victories in 121 sorties. He was posted as an instructor to No. 71 Operational Training Unit in the Sudan on 19 October, ostensibly for a rest from operations, but was soon recalled to take over leadership of No. 3 Squadron from Peter Jeffrey, who had been promoted to wing commander. Rawlinson was promoted acting squadron leader on 9 November, and assumed command the next day.

On 22 November 1941, during Operation Crusader, Rawlinson led No. 3 Squadron on a bomber escort mission near Bir el Gubi in Italian Libya in the morning, and a fighter sweep south-east of El Adem in the afternoon. German Messerschmitt Bf 109 fighters shot down three Tomahawks for the loss of two of their own in the first action, Rawlinson claiming a 109 damaged. In the second action, a drawn-out battle for air superiority, the squadron lost six Tomahawks against three 109s destroyed, one of which was claimed by Rawlinson along with one probable and two damaged. He had also taken a shot at a distant 109 and, believing he had missed it, did not claim. After the war it was established that Rawlinson's bullets had damaged the 109 and wounded its pilot, Ernst Düllberg, who made a forced landing back at base. Rawlinson was credited with his final victory on 30 November, when he downed an Italian Macchi C.200 in an engagement that saw No. 3 Squadron's tally of claims rise to 106 aircraft destroyed.

Rawlinson handed over command of No. 3 Squadron on 12 December 1941. After a brief posting to RAF Headquarters Middle East, he took command of the RAF Air Firing and Fighting School on 26 December. The same day, he was awarded a bar to his DFC, for having "fostered great keenness and a fine fighting spirit amongst pilots of his squadron". He reverted to the rank of flight lieutenant on 12 February 1942, as he no longer held a squadron leader's position, and returned to Australia. Rawlinson is generally credited with a total of eight victories in the Middle East, plus two probables and eight damaged (not counting Düllberg), though the RAAF Historical Section gives him a score of ten victories.

=== South West Pacific ===
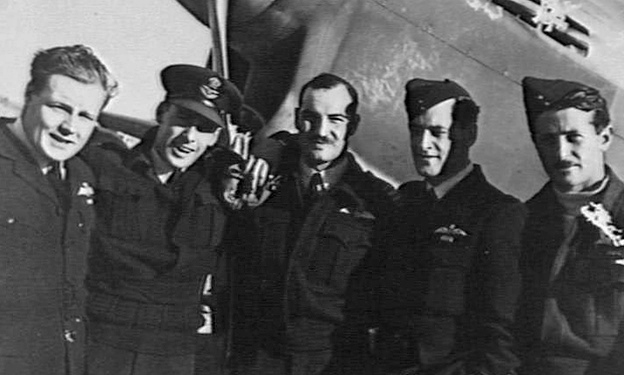
Rawlinson (centre) with Keith Truscott (far left) and Peter Jeffrey (left) at No. 2 OTU, Mildura, June 1942

Arriving in Melbourne on 28 March 1942, Rawlinson was re-raised to temporary squadron leader on 1 April and took charge of the newly formed No. 2 Operational Training Unit (No. 2 OTU) on 13 April. Peter Jeffrey assumed command two weeks later, Rawlinson becoming chief flying instructor. Other instructors at the school included desert aces Clive Caldwell and Wilf Arthur. Rawlinson and Jeffrey had been dissatisfied with the flying standards of replacement pilots in the Middle East, and all the veterans were eager to get trainees "operational" before they posted to frontline units. Initially based at Port Pirie, South Australia, No. 2 OTU relocated to Mildura, Victoria, on 14 May and shortly afterwards began receiving P-40 Kittyhawks. In June 1942, Rawlinson, Arthur and a United States Army Air Forces (USAAF) pilot conducted comparative trials pitting the new CAC Boomerang against a Kittyhawk and a Bell Airacobra, reporting favourably on the Boomerang's handling characteristics.

On 21 September 1942, Rawlinson was posted to RAAF Headquarters, Melbourne, as an assistant at the office of the Chief of the Air Staff. There he was asked to lead the only RAAF Supermarine Spitfire squadron to be formed in Australia, No. 79 Squadron. Rawlinson married Thora Doreen Buckland, a Women's Auxiliary Australian Air Force officer, on 3 April 1943.

No. 79 Squadron was formed on 26 April 1943 at Laverton, Victoria. It received its first Spitfire VCs on 3 May, and a fortnight later began moving to Goodenough Island, off New Guinea's east coast. Along with two Kittyhawk units, Nos. 76 and 77 Squadrons, No. 79 Squadron came under control of No. 73 Wing, which was part of No. 9 Operational Group, the RAAF's main mobile formation in the South West Pacific. The Spitfires were to provide top cover for the Kittyhawks in the New Guinea campaign against Japanese forces. Rawlinson picked the squadron code letters UP, and his own aircraft's identifier U, to spell UP-U ("up you") on his Spitfire's fuselage. After a quiet spell at Goodenough, in August the squadron moved to Kiriwina, the closest Allied airfield to the major Japanese base at Rabaul. This promised enemy raids but none occurred during the first weeks of the squadron's deployment, and the pilots saw no combat while patrolling in support of USAAF attacks on Rabaul; Rawlinson commented that it was "a disappointment to us. What a letdown." The Japanese began attacking Kiriwina in early October, and No. 79 Squadron claimed its first victory on 31 October, when one of the Spitfires shot down a Kawasaki Ki-61 "Tony" fighter north of the airfield.

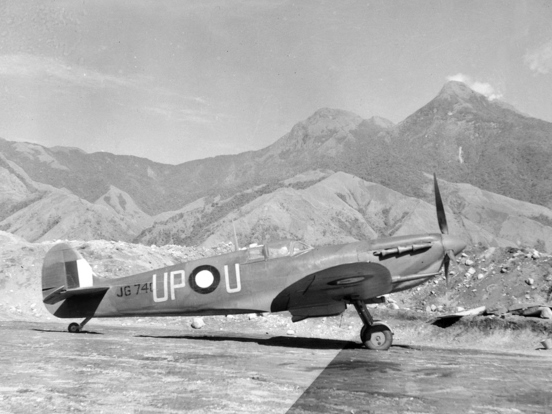
Rawlinson's No. 79 Squadron Spitfire, codenamed UP-U, at Goodenough Island, New Guinea, July 1943

Having been promoted to temporary wing commander on 1 August 1943, Rawlinson handed over command of No. 79 Squadron on 7 November and was appointed wing leader of No. 73 Wing, headquartered at Kiriwina. The wing leader was responsible for tactical command of the formation in the air. Minimal offensive air activity by the Japanese meant that No. 79 Squadron's Spitfires saw relatively little action; the wing's Kittyhawks, with their ground-attack capability, were heavily engaged. On 15 December, the day of the Allied landings at Arawe, No. 76 Squadron Kittyhawks patrolled above the beaches while the Spitfires remained at Kiriwina in case of strikes by Japanese raiders, though none came.

Rawlinson returned to Australia to undertake the War Staff Course at the RAAF Staff School in Mount Martha, Victoria, from 4 January to 24 March 1944. His health had suffered as a result of his service in the Pacific and he was judged unfit for operational flying. His next posting was as commanding officer of the RAAF's Paratroop Training Unit, based at Richmond, from 1 April 1944 to 23 April 1945; the school was responsible for training Australian Army personnel, including the 1st Parachute Battalion and Z Special Forces. Rawlinson's assessing officer at Richmond considered him "particularly keen and adaptable", having performed well despite the challenges of his "unique appointment".

After a brief posting as Director of Air Staff Policy at RAAF Headquarters, Rawlinson succeeded Wilf Arthur as commander of No. 78 (Fighter) Wing at Tarakan, Borneo, on 25 May 1945. The wing came under the control of the First Tactical Air Force, which had taken over No. 9 Group's mobile role and was supporting Australian forces during the Borneo campaign. No. 78 Wing's complement included Nos. 75, 78 and 80 Squadrons, operating Kittyhawks, and several ancillary units. In June and July, the wing took part in the assaults on Labuan and Balikpapan, undertaking convoy escort in the former and, joined by Spitfires of No. 452 Squadron, ground-attack missions in support of the 7th Division in the latter. Rawlinson was raised to acting group captain on 24 July. At the end of the war, No. 78 Wing departed Tarakan for Australia, arriving at RAAF Station Deniliquin, New South Wales, in December 1945. It relocated in May–June to RAAF Station Schofields, and then in August to RAAF Station Williamtown, where it re-equipped with P-51 Mustangs.

== Post-war career ==
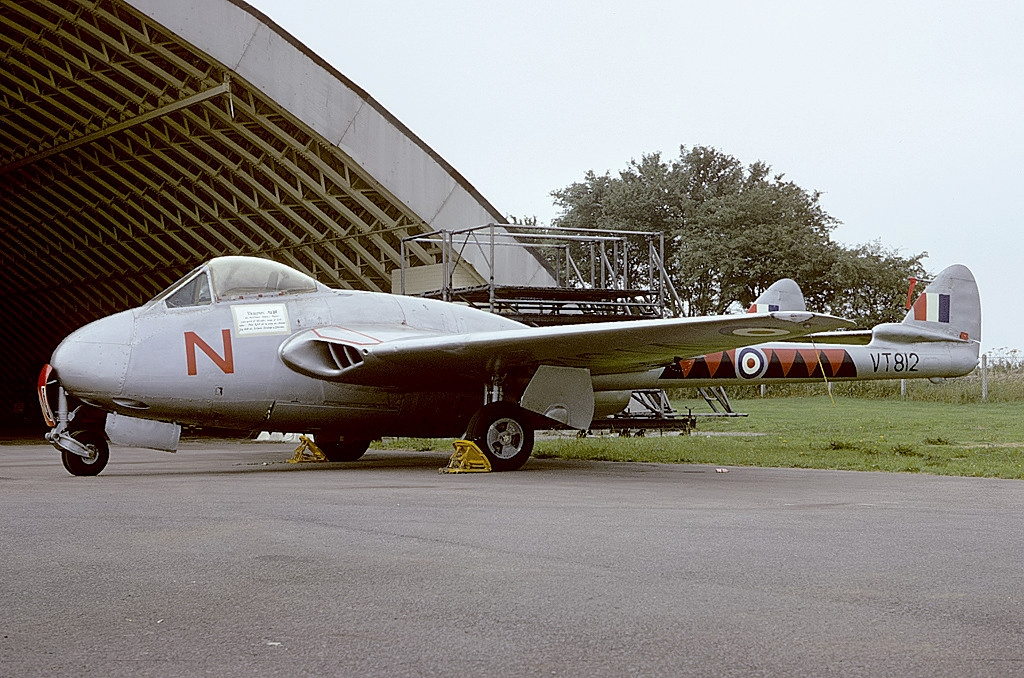
Vampire F3, a type flown at RAF Odiham

Rawlinson retained command of No. 78 Wing until his commission was terminated on 19 December 1946. "The peace-time RAAF was not to his liking", according to McAulay, and on 21 March 1947, Rawlinson took a commission in Britain with the Royal Air Force (RAF) as a substantive squadron leader (seniority from 1 June 1944) and temporary wing commander (seniority from 1 August 1943 until 1 November 1947). His initial posting was at Headquarters Fighter Command (HQFC). Between June and October 1949 he was commanding officer of No. 54 Squadron, which operated de Havilland Vampire jet fighters at RAF Odiham in Hampshire. He then served as wing commander (flying) for the Odiham Wing, comprising three Vampire units including Nos. 54, 72 (replaced by No. 421 Squadron RCAF in January 1951) and 247 Squadrons, until May 1952. Recalling training for Cold War operations, he said: "The introduction of jet fighters meant, roughly, that speeds were doubled and endurances halved. Precision was the name of the game. [...] The aim was to achieve, as close as possible, the maximum effort with day operations in all-weather conditions against the nuclear threat". Reduced flying hours owing to "budgetary limitations" meant that "as much as possible of the HQFC syllabus was crammed into each sortie".

On 26 May 1951, Rawlinson led the Odiham Wing and three formations of Gloster Meteors in a flypast over Hyde Park, London, to mark the presentation of the King's Colour to the RAF. He was awarded the Air Force Cross on 5 June 1952, and promoted to substantive wing commander on 1 July. Rawlinson's next command posting was RAF Filton in Bristol, where he controlled a Vampire wing consisting of two Royal Auxiliary Air Force squadrons, No. 501 (City of Gloucester) at Filton and No. 614 (County of Glamorgan) at RAF Llandow in Wales. In late 1953 he became the inaugural commanding officer of the RAF Guided Weapons Trials Unit, responsible for testing beam-riding missiles for the Meteor NF.11; his duties took him from Wales to Woomera in South Australia, where he flew test aircraft in attacks against target drones including unmanned Fairey Fireflies and the GAF Jindivik. Rawlinson's next posting, to command RAF Patrington in Yorkshire, was announced on 3 February 1958. He was appointed an Officer of the Order of the British Empire in the Queen's Birthday Honours promulgated on 12 June. On 22 February 1960, he was raised to acting group captain and placed in charge of RAF Buchan, a Fighter Command sector station in Scotland.

== Retirement ==
At his own request, Rawlinson was discharged from the RAF as a group captain on 13 November 1961, and retired to South Australia. By 2003, he was living in Naracoorte, where in October he was visited by No. 79 Squadron's commanding officer, Wing Commander Peter Campbell, as part of the unit's sixtieth anniversary celebrations. Two of the squadron's Hawk 127 fighter trainers later overflew the town in Rawlinson's honour. Rawlinson died in Naracoorte on 27 August 2007, aged eighty-nine. He was survived by his wife and two sons, and cremated in a private ceremony. His portrait, painted in 1944 by Flight Lieutenant Vernon Jones, is held by the State Library of Victoria.
