= John Overall =

John Overall may refer to:

- Sir John Overall (architect) (1913–2001), Australian World War II veteran and architect
- John Overall (bishop) (1559–1619), Bishop of Norwich
