= 1st Mountain Battery (Australia) =

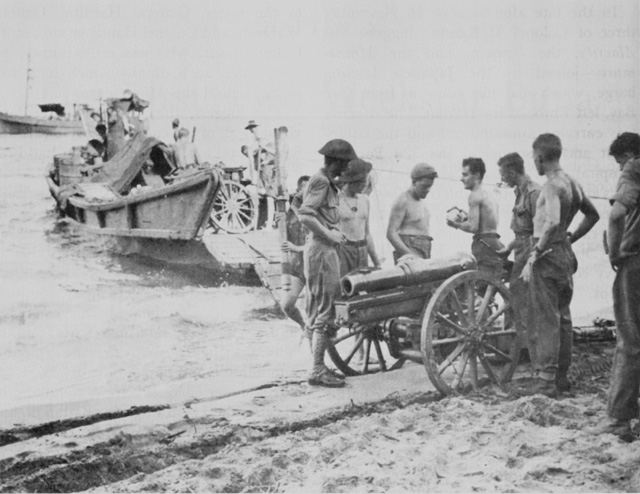
- A 3.7 inch mountain howitzer of the 1st Mountain Battery being dismantled before being loading onto a Japanese motor barge (captured at Milne Bay).
- Active: 1942–46
- Country: Australia
- Branch: Australian Military Forces
- Role: Artillery
- Size: One battery
- Engagements: World War II: Battle of Buna–Gona; Salamaua–Lae campaign

The 1st Mountain Battery was an Australian Army artillery battery formed in July 1942, that served during the Second World War, seeing action against the Japanese during the Battle of Buna–Gona and the Salamaua–Lae campaign in 1942–43. The unit was added to the 1st Parachute Battalion in August 1944 providing an organic indirect fire support, equipped with Short 25-pounder guns, but did not see further action in this role. The battery was disbanded in 1946.

== History ==
=== Formation ===
The 1st Mountain Battery was formed in July 1942 in response to an urgent request from New Guinea Force. Captain Martin O'Hare, an officer of the Regular Army, was appointed battery commander, while personnel were drawn from artillery units in I Corps and from the 6th Motor Regiment, which had previously been converted from the light horse role. Equipped with 3.7-inch pack howitzers hastily obtained from the Royal New Zealand Navy, it was formed as a four-gun battery with a strength of four officers and 209 other ranks. Initially it was intended that the guns would be moved by pack horse; however, following the unit's arrival in Port Moresby in early October it soon became clear that horses would be unsuited to the humid conditions in New Guinea with the guns to be moved by jeeps and native carriers instead. It took about 90 porters to move one gun without ammunition.

=== Battle of Buna–Gona ===
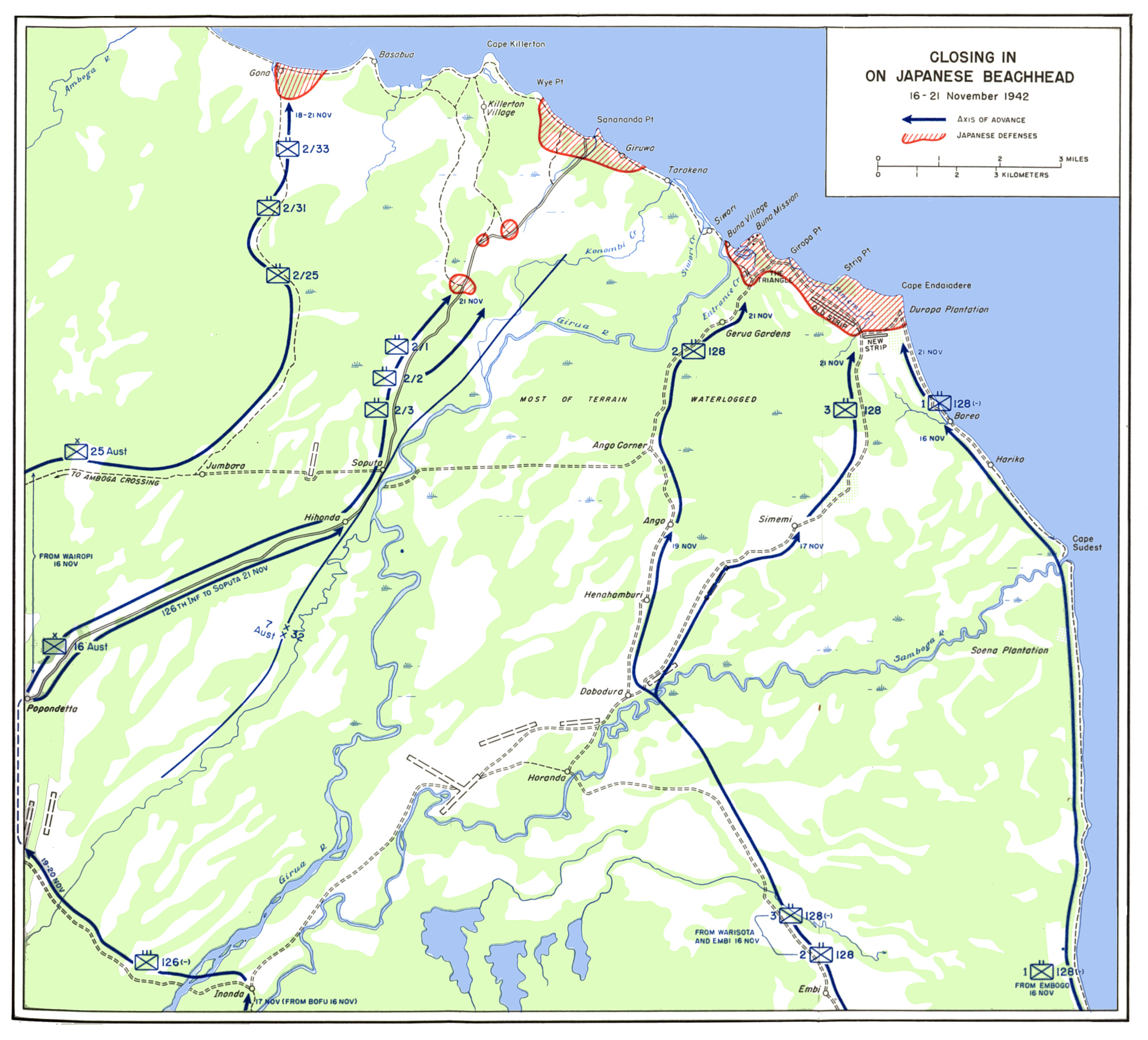
Closing in on the Japanese Beachhead 16–21 November 1942

The battery supported the Australian and American forces during the Battle of Buna–Gona. It was the only artillery in place to support the Allies during the opening engagements on 19 November 1942. (Note: Two 25-pounders of the 2/5th Field Regiment were brought into action on 22 November, having been brought forward from Oro Bay. Oro Bay was about 10 miles (16 km) directly southeast along the coast. Shortly after, further guns arrived by air.) On 15 November, a detachment of the left section, with one gun was flown into Kokoda to support the Australian 7th Division, which had driven the Japanese back along the Kokoda Track. By 16 November the division was preparing to cross the Kumusi River and advance against Japanese positions at Gona and Sanananda. (Note: The unit history (Allan & Cutts, 1994) reports this as a detachment while the other sources simply refer to it as a section.)

Meanwhile, the right section, with two guns, was also provided to support the US 32nd Division which was preparing to seize Buna. The section was flown to Pongani, on the north coast of New Guinea, on 12 November. It was then moved along the coast by barge. During the battle, the section initially deployed to a position about 1,000 yards (910 m) north of Cape Sudest on 16 November. The following day, it moved to a position about 600 yards (600 m) north of Hariko. It later moved to a position on the Dobodura–Buna track. This was about 2,000 yards (1,800 m) south of the bridge between the two strips. On 5 December, the detachment from Kokoda joined the right section at Buna. (Note: However, the Center of Military History publication records this gun in support by 26 November.) On 26 December, the howitzers ran out of ammunition and took no further part in the fighting.

=== Advance towards Salamaua ===
In late February 1943, a section of 1st Mountain Battery was flown into Wau to support the advance to Salamaua. The section accompanied the 17th Brigade from Wau. As the terrain and thick jungle prevented additional guns being moved forward, this was the brigade's only artillery support. By June, the 3rd Division was finally approaching Salamaua, with the 17th Brigade advancing from the south-south-west. The brigade was supported by two 3.7 inch howitzers from the 1st Mountain Battery as well as one US field battery. Forward observers from the battery often directed fire from positions as close as 50 metres (55 yd) from Japanese positions due to limited observation as a result of the thick jungle canopy and low cloud; however, the battery's guns proved highly accurate. They were subsequently involved in the successful attack on Komiatum on 16 August, which saw the divisional artillery concentrated to support the brigade.

=== Parachute role ===
In August 1944, the battery was added to the 1st Parachute Battalion, providing an organic indirect fire support, equipped with Short 25-pounder guns. Although the battalion was warned for deployment on a number of occasions, the battery saw no further action before the war ended. It ceased to exist in 1946 when the 1st Parachute Battalion was disbanded.

== Notes ==
Footnotes

Citations
