= 1st Parachute Battalion (Australia) =

1943–1946 unit of the Australian Army

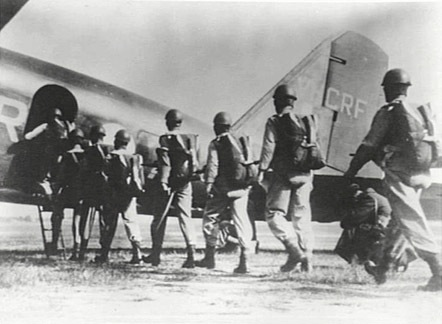
- Soldiers from the 1st Parachute Battalion boarding a DC-2 in 1944.
- Active: 1943–1946
- Country: Australia
- Branch: Australian Army
- Type: Airborne forces
- Role: Parachute infantry
- Size: Battalion
- Battle honours: None

Commanders
- Notable commanders: Lieutenant Colonel Sir John Overall

Insignia
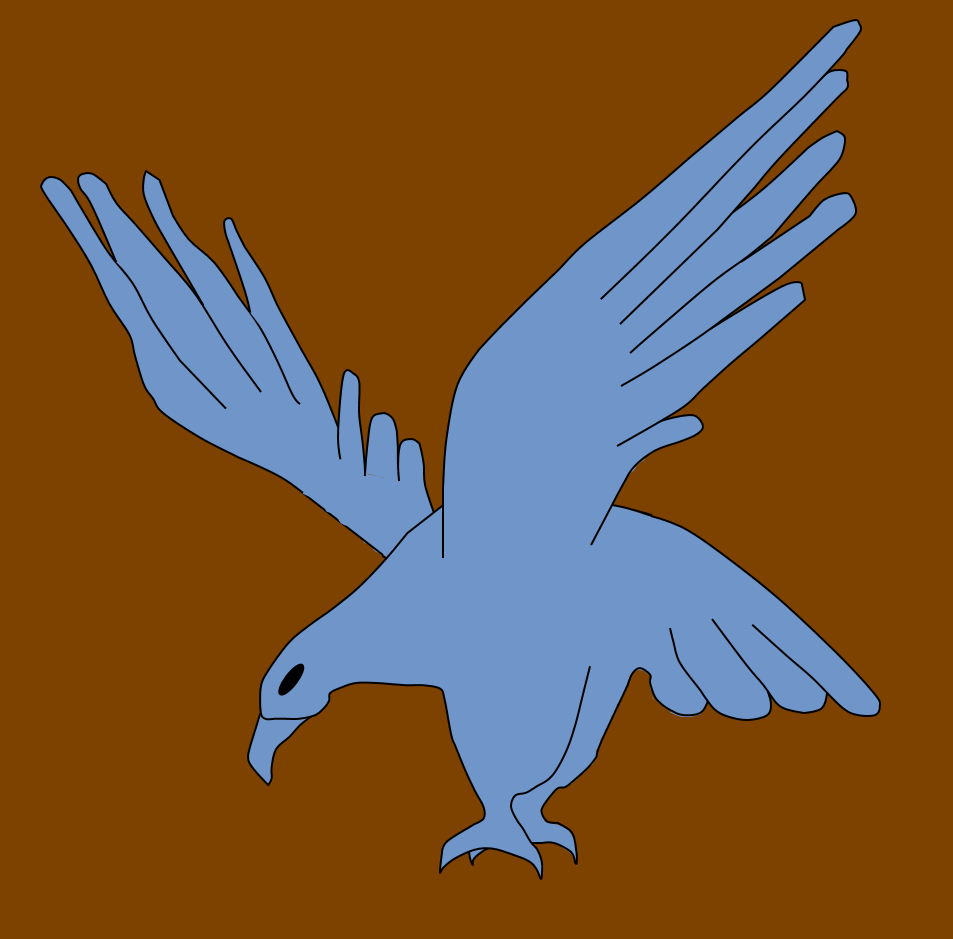
- Unit colour patch

The 1st Parachute Battalion was a parachute infantry battalion of the Australian Army. Raised for service during the Second World War, it was formed in early 1943 from volunteers for airborne training. Despite achieving a high level of readiness, the battalion did not see action during the war and was disbanded in early 1946.

== History ==
Like the British Army, Australia did not have a parachute operations capability at the outbreak of the Second World War; however, the demonstration of the effectiveness of such forces by the Germans in the early stages of the conflict soon provided the impetus for their development. Efforts to raise an operational parachute capability in the Australian Army began in November 1942, with 40 volunteers being selected for initial training with the newly formed Paratroop Training Unit. The first descents were made at Tocumwal in New South Wales, with the initial parachute courses consisting of four jumps. By March 1943 enough personnel had been trained for the Army to consider forming a full parachute battalion. As a result, the 1st Parachute Battalion was raised at this time at RAAF Station Richmond near Sydney, New South Wales.

Initially, raised on a reduced scale of only two rifle companies, the battalion's personnel were mainly drawn from volunteers from other Army units—mostly the independent companies that had been set up in 1941–42 to carry out irregular warfare—and as a result, most of the battalion's personnel had seen active service prior to being accepted. These volunteers completed their parachute training with 1st Parachute Training Unit before joining the battalion, and upon completion of their training qualified to wear the maroon beret, which was adopted by the 1st Parachute Battalion as a symbol of their elite status. In April 1943, while based at Scheyville Farm, the battalion raised a troop of engineers. Consisting of six officers and 51 other ranks, the 1st Parachute Troop, Royal Australian Engineers, was specially trained to undertake clandestine demolitions work alongside the battalion's rifle companies.

As the battalion was to be Australia's first airborne unit it required extensive training. Consequently, in addition to basic parachute training at Richmond, the battalion also trained in jungle warfare at Canungra in Queensland. In September 1943, Major John Overall, formerly of the 2/13th Field Company, Royal Australian Engineers, was appointed as commanding officer. Throughout this time training continued in the demolitions, tactics and parachuting, and as no reserve parachutes were used several fatalities occurred. A third rifle company was formed in October 1943 and by January 1944 the battalion was at full strength. Following company and battalion level exercises the battalion was declared ready for operations in May 1944 and moved to Mareeba airstrip in North Queensland. A fourth rifle company was formed in June 1944. In August 1944 the battalion gained its own organic indirect fire support when it was joined by the parachute qualified 1st Mountain Battery, Royal Australian Artillery, equipped with short 25 Pounder guns.

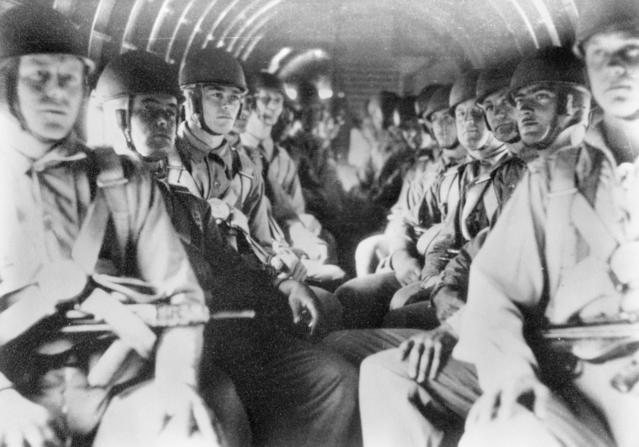
Members of 'A' Company, 1st Parachute Battalion during a training flight in 1944

In late 1944, the battalion was alerted to begin preparations for operations in Borneo as part of the Borneo campaign. As well as preparing for airborne operations, the battalion also conducted amphibious training in late January and early February 1945 as part of a possible role in the amphibious landing at Balikpapan. The battalion was not used in this operation, however, due to a shortage of suitable aircraft. (Note: The battalion required between 24 and 100 C-47 transports to lift it (24 if dropped in waves, 100 in one drop).) A few months later, the battalion was warned to prepare for a mission to rescue thousands of Allied prisoners held by the Japanese at Sandakan in North Borneo. This operation, codenamed Operation Kingfisher, was controversially cancelled and the prisoners were subsequently killed by the Japanese in what subsequently became known as the Sandakan Death Marches. The disappointment of not being deployed to Borneo caused significant frustration within the battalion, with many soldiers requesting transfers to other infantry units such as Z Special Unit. Many of these requests were denied, however, as the battalion had been instructed to prepare to operate alongside British paratroopers in the planned liberation of Singapore that was to have taken place later in 1945 as part of Operations Zipper and Mailfist.

The war ended before these operations took place, however, and following the Japanese surrender the battalion was ordered to prepare to deploy to Singapore for garrison duties. While an advance party of 120 men arrived in Singapore on 9 September, the rest of the battalion remained in Australia. The unit contributed an honour guard to the main surrender ceremony. Afterwards, a further 75 men were sent out to join them and together this force performed general garrison and policing duties before returning to Australia in January 1946. Orders were received to disband the battalion on 29 January 1946, and these were carried out the following day at Sydney.

== Composition ==
The 1st Parachute Battalion was organised with the following sub units:

- Battalion Headquarters
  - Battalion Headquarters Company
  - 'A' Company
  - 'B' Company
  - 'C' Company (from October 1943)
  - 'D' Company (from June 1944)
  - 1st Parachute Troop, Royal Australian Engineers
  - 1st Mountain Battery (from August 1944).

== See also ==
- Airborne forces of Australia

== Notes ==
Footnotes

Citations
