= Australian Defence Force Parachuting School =

Training unit of the Australian Army

- Active: 12 August 1951–present
- Country: Australia
- Branch: Army
- Part of: Defence Special Operations Training and Education Centre
- Garrison/HQ: HMAS Albatross, Nowra, New South Wales
- Motto: Knowledge Dispels Fear

The Australian Defence Force Parachuting School is an Australian Army unit part of the Defence Special Operations Training and Education Centre (DSOTEC) that provides training in parachuting techniques, develops parachute doctrine and techniques and conducts trial-evaluations of parachute systems and associated equipment. The school is based adjacent to HMAS Albatross, Nowra, New South Wales.

== History ==
The first parachute training unit was formed in 1942 the Paratroop Training Unit (PTU) and at the end of the war was disbanded. On 12 August 1951, the Parachute Training Wing was formed as a Royal Australian Air Force (RAAF) unit at RAAF Base Williamtown, New South Wales. The unit's first Commanding Officer/Chief Instructor was Squadron Leader C.A.V. Bourne. The instructors on the staff were both Army and RAAF personnel. The first course of trainees commenced in September 1951. In 1958, the wing was renamed the Parachute Training Flight. In 1961, the first Military Free Fall (MFF) Paratroop Course was conducted.

The Army assumed responsibility for parachute training on 14 May 1974 and the school was renamed the Parachute Training School, under the command of Lieutenant Colonel Harry Smith. The school relocated to Naval Air Station HMAS Albatross in 1986 and has continued its role there until the present.

On 1 October 2011, the school transferred from Forces Command (FORCOMD) to Special Operations Command (SOCOMD). On 19 November 2019, the SOCOMD training units were reorganised with the school renamed the Australian Defence Force Parachuting School and placed under the command of the newly raised Defence Special Operations Training and Education Centre.

== Structure ==
The school is believed to be organised as follows:

- Headquarters – co-ordinates the functions of the School.
- Training Wing – conducts all parachute training activities of the School.
- Development Wing (DEV WING) – conducts evaluation and testing of personnel parachute systems and associated equipment.
- Parachute Maintenance Wing (PMW) – stores repairs and repacks all personnel parachutes.
- Logistic Support Wing – stores, transport, medical and catering.

The school provides static line training with the T-11 non-steerable parachute and the MC-6 steerable parachute at altitudes between 800 feet (240 m) and 1,000 feet (300 m) on land and water. Military Free Fall training is provided from aircraft up to 12,000 feet (3,660 m). High Altitude Parachute Operations (HAPO) is provided from aircraft up to 25,000 feet (7,620 m) descending with oxygen.

== Red Berets ==
In May 1974, the Parachute Training School established an Army Parachute Display Team the "Red Berets" renaming the Air Force's Parachute Display Team the "Dominoes". The team is composed of instructors and staff from the parachuting school. The team provides displays around Australia including jumps with flags, smoke and in formation. The Red Berets conduct 15 to 20 displays each year.

== Aircraft ==
In 1951, the school used the Douglas C-47 Dakota aircraft for training. The Lockheed C-130 Hercules entered service in 1962 followed by the de Havilland Canada DHC-4 Caribou in 1964 with the Dakota retired.

The Boeing CH-47 Chinook helicopter was used for training from 1973 to 1986 and the Bell UH-1 Iroquois helicopter was used from 1974 to 1990 for freefall only training.

The school also used Army Pilatus Porter, GAF Nomad and de Havilland Canada DHC-6 Twin Otter light transport aircraft for freefall only training.

In 2007, the school entered into a service a parachute training dedicated aircraft the CASA C-212 Aviocar with two civilian C-212-200 aircraft provided by Military Support Services to replace the Caribou. Since 2013, two civilian C-212-400 aircraft have been provided by Skytraders.

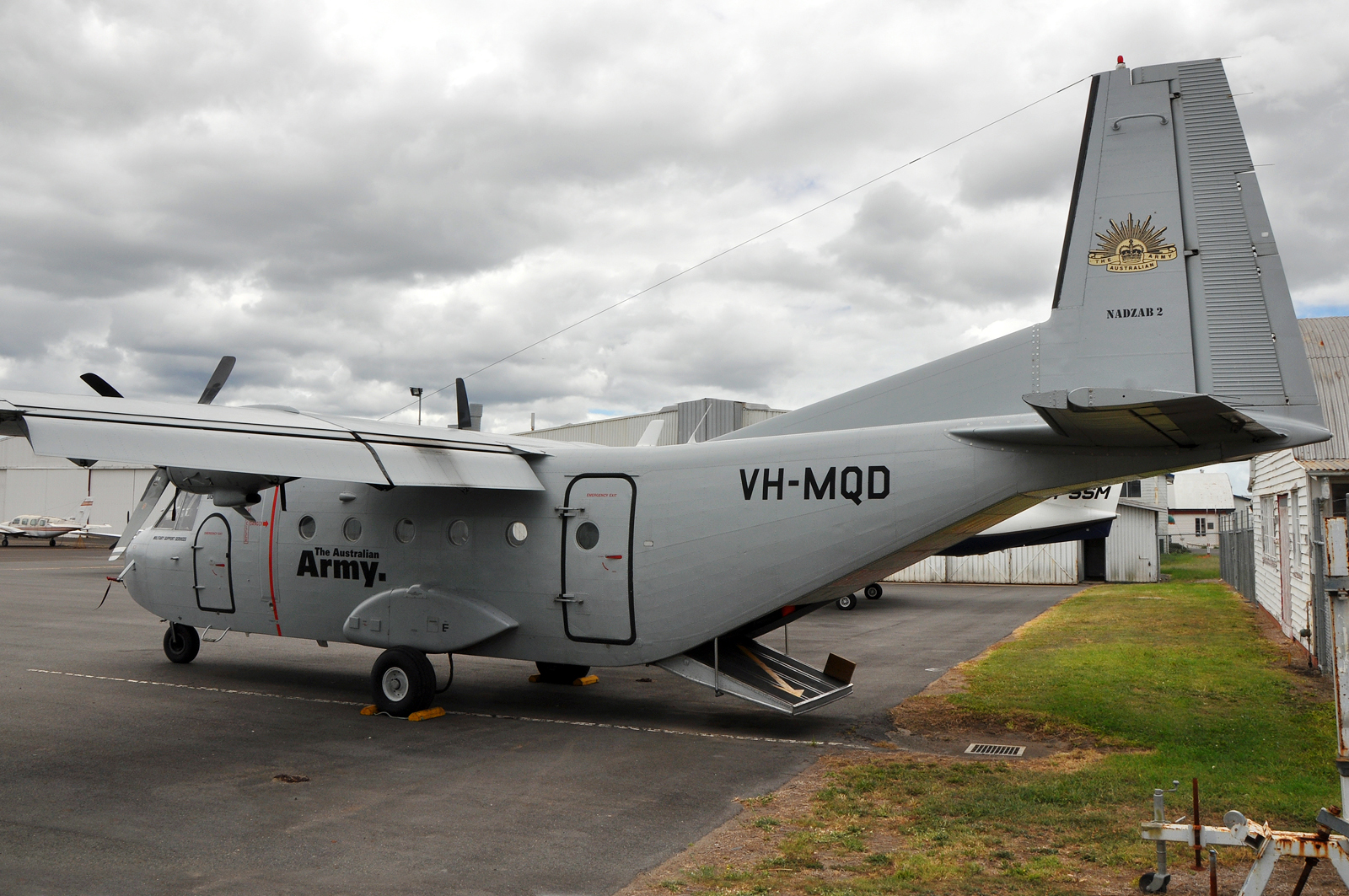
Military Support Services CASA C-212-200

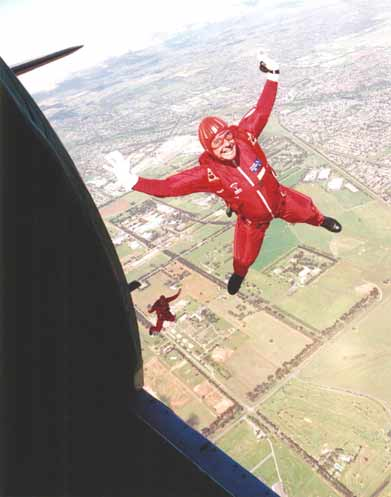
A Red Berets parachute rigger during a jump from a Dakota
