= John Overall (architect) =

Australian Second World War veteran and architect

Sir John Overall CBE, MC & Bar

Commissioner of the National Capital Development Commission
- In office 1958–1972
- Succeeded by: William Andrews

Personal details
- Born: 15 July 1913 Sydney, New South Wales
- Died: 2 September 2001 (aged 88) Canberra, Australian Capital Territory
- Education: Sydney Technical College
- Occupation: Architect
- Civilian awards: Knight Bachelor; Commander of the Order of the British Empire; Royal Australian Institute of Architects Gold Medal

Military service
- Allegiance: Australia
- Branch/service: Second Australian Imperial Force
- Years of service: 1940–1945
- Rank: Lieutenant Colonel
- Commands: 1st Parachute Battalion
- Battles/wars: Second World War; Western Desert campaign; First Battle of El Alamein
- Military awards: Military Cross & Bar

Sir John Wallace Overall, CBE, MC & Bar (15 July 1913 – 2 September 2001) was an Australian Second World War veteran and architect. As inaugural Commissioner of the National Capital Development Commission from 1957 to 1972, he made a significant contribution to the development of Canberra.

== Early life ==
Overall was born in Sydney, New South Wales, on 15 July 1913. He had humble beginnings and grew up with his sisters in a Masonic home in Sydney.

He studied architecture at the Sydney Technical College in the 1920s.

== Second World War ==
Overall served as an officer in the Second Australian Imperial Force during the Second World War, where he was awarded the Military Cross for "great courage, devotion and initiative" in 1941 for his service during the early Western Desert campaign in North Africa. Overall was awarded a Bar to the decoration for his "outstanding leadership and disregard for danger" on 1 September 1942 during the First Battle of El Alamein. After serving with the 9th Divisional Engineers, in September 1943 he took over command of Australia's first parachute infantry battalion, the 1st Parachute Battalion, and was in command of that unit when they deployed to Singapore at the end of the war.

== Architectural career ==
When he returned to Australia following the war, Overall worked as an architect and in 1952 was made the Chief Government Architect in the Commonwealth Department of Works. In 1957 he was appointed Commissioner of the newly established National Capital Development Commission (NCDC). In this role Overall made a significant contribution to the development of Canberra up until 1972 and in this regard is known as the "father of Canberra" for implementing Walter Burley Griffin's vision for the city as the founding Commissioner of the NCDC, a position he held for 25 years. Overall was also an advisor to various State Governments and fought vigorously for the protection of the Rocks area in Sydney which was marked for redevelopment.

Overall returned to private practice in 1972, where he served on the boards of Lend Lease and CSR Limited.

Overall lobbied successive governments for the building of a new parliament house, and in 1977 was asked by Malcolm Fraser, Prime Minister of Australia, to be chairman of the selection committee that chose the winning design for the new building. Overall also became a member of the construction committee of the new Parliament House and he fought vigorously for the integrity of the original design to be maintained when synthetic grass was suggested as a cost-cutting measure by the government of the day for the roof of Parliament House. Today Parliament House has a grass lawn roof as a result of Overall's passion for the integrity of the design to be implemented. He threatened to resign over the issue and lobbied Paul Keating, then Federal Treasurer to approve the additional funds to complete the building.

== Recognition and honours ==
Overall was awarded the Royal Australian Institute of Architects Gold Medal in 1982, and John Overall Offices, the head office of the ACT Planning and Land Management and Overall Avenue in the Canberra suburb of Casey were named in his honour.

Overall is now highly regarded as the "father" of Canberra for implementing the Walter Burley Griffin "vision" and transforming Canberra from the "Bush Capital" as it was described as from the 1920s to the 1950s as well as selecting the design for the new Parliament House.

The Sir John Overall Award for Urban Design is presented annually by the ACT Chapter of the Australian Institute of Architects.

== Personal life ==
Overall's wife Margaret died in 1988; he dedicated Canberra Yesterday and Today to her as 'my inspiration and our family's inspiration.' The couple had four sons and, at Overall's death in 2001, eleven grandchildren.
