= MC-6 parachute =

American military parachute

MC-6 Advanced Tactical Parachute System
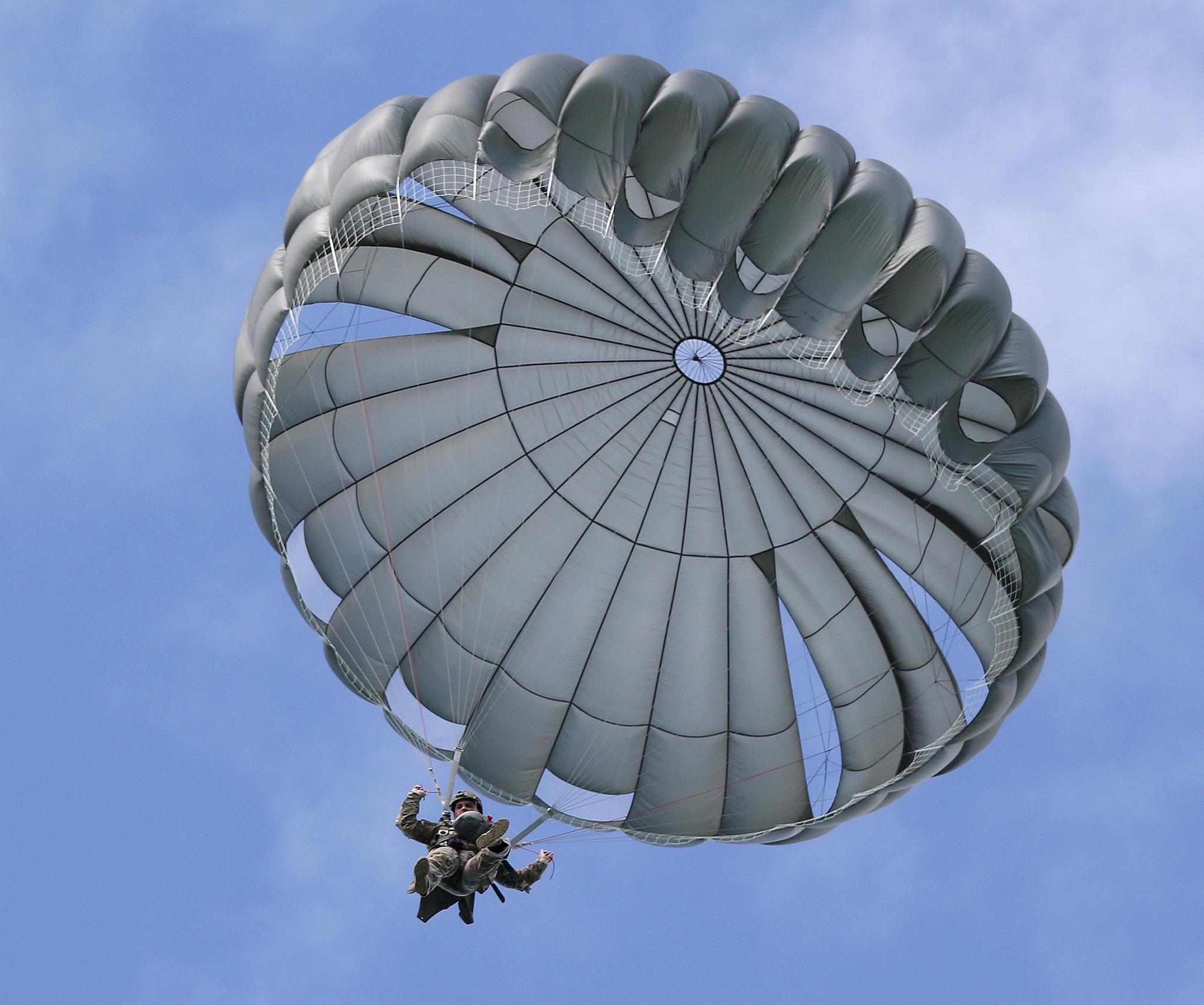
- Military parachutist descending under an MC-6 canopy
- Type: Steerable static line parachute
- Place of origin: United States

Service history
- In service: 2006–present (19 years)
- Used by: USSOCOM, SOCOMD

Production history
- Manufacturer: Irvin Aerospace (canopy), Para-Flite Inc (harness)
- No. produced: 25,500+

Specifications
- Weight: 29 lb (13 kg)
- Diameter: 32 ft (9.8 m)

The MC-6 Parachute is a Maneuverable Canopy (MC) static line-deployed personnel parachute of the United States Armed Forces. Developed by United States Army Special Forces, the parachute has been used by American Special Operations Forces (SOF) beginning in 2006 and Australian SOF starting in 2011.

Under an initiative dubbed Special Operations Forces Tactical Advanced Parachute System (SOFTAPS), intended to provide a replacement for the MC1-1 Parachute, the SF-10A Parachute became an interim successor to the MC1-1 before culminating in the development and production of the MC-6 Parachute.

== Background ==
In the mid-1990s, as part of the Base Realignment and Closure plan, the 10th Special Forces Group was relocated from Fort Devens, Massachusetts to Fort Carson, Colorado. The altitude of their new garrison at over 5,800 feet (1,800 m) proved challenging in many ways, not the least of which was that their new higher altitude meant that aircraft stall speeds were somewhat higher than at their previous base.

The increased speeds of the jump aircraft resulted in soldiers experiencing violent opening shocks and as many as 40% of all canopies were damaged during some training jumps while using their standard issued MC1-1-series parachutes. Some of the MC1-1s suffered catastrophic damage to their canopies such as blown section or gore and damaged suspension lines. Jumpers encountering these malfunctions are trained to activate their reserve parachutes if their rate of descent is faster than other jumpers or if they are unable to compare their rate of descent.

In 1998, the US Army Special Forces Command (Airborne) began the SOFTAPS initiative, directing their organic Airborne Special Operations Test Directorate (ASOTD) to identify an interim replacement for the MC1-1 until the Advanced Tactical Parachute System (ATPS) Program Office fielded a suitable permanent replacement. The ASOTD tested six candidates at Fort Carson with drop zones at over 6,000 ft (1,800 m) in elevation in 1999, ultimately selecting an existing commercial off-the-shelf product used by Forest Service smokejumpers called the FS-14 Parachute. The FS-14 canopy was integrated with the T-10 Parachute harness, creating the SF-10A Parachute with the "SF" designation signifying Special Forces.

== Development ==
Since the SF-10A was only intended to be a temporary replacement for the MC1-1-series of parachutes under SOFTAPS and not an official Army Program of Record, US Army Special Operations Command was responsible for all costs incurred through the life of the SF-10A program. When ATPS, the official program of record, developed the T-11 Parachute as the Army's newest non-steerable parachute, the canopy from the SF-10A was integrated into the harness of the T-11 resulting in the MC-6.

The T-11 harness provides a wider array of sizing options for jumper comfort and fit, features integral attachment points for the newly developed T-11R Reserve Parachute, and is capable of sustaining 40 lb (18 kg) more weight than the T-10 harnesses used in the SF-10A. Since the T-11 and MC-6 parachute systems are almost identical in outward appearance, donning and inspection procedures of both parachutes are likewise similar. This similarity minimizes, but does not eliminate, training requirements for jumpers and jumpmasters transitioning from the T-11 to the MC-6.

Select Characteristics of MC1-1 and MC-6 Parachutes
	MC-6	MC1-1
Nominal Diameter	32 ft (9.8 m)	35 ft (11 m)
Number of Gores	28	30
Suspension Lines	28 ea 21.3 ft (6.5 m)	30 ea 22 ft (6.7 m)
Time for 360° Turn	5 seconds	8.8 seconds
Maximum Exit Weight	400 lb (180 kg)	360 lb (160 kg)
Minimum Exit AGL (@125kn)	475 ft (145 m)	500 ft (150 m)
Forward Thrust	10 knots (19 km/h; 12 mph)	8 knots (15 km/h; 9.2 mph)
Rate of Descent	14.5–18.5 ft/s (4.4–5.6 m/s)	14–22 ft/s (4.3–6.7 m/s)
Maximum Altitude MSL	11,000 ft (3,400 m)	10,000 ft (3,000 m)

== Design ==
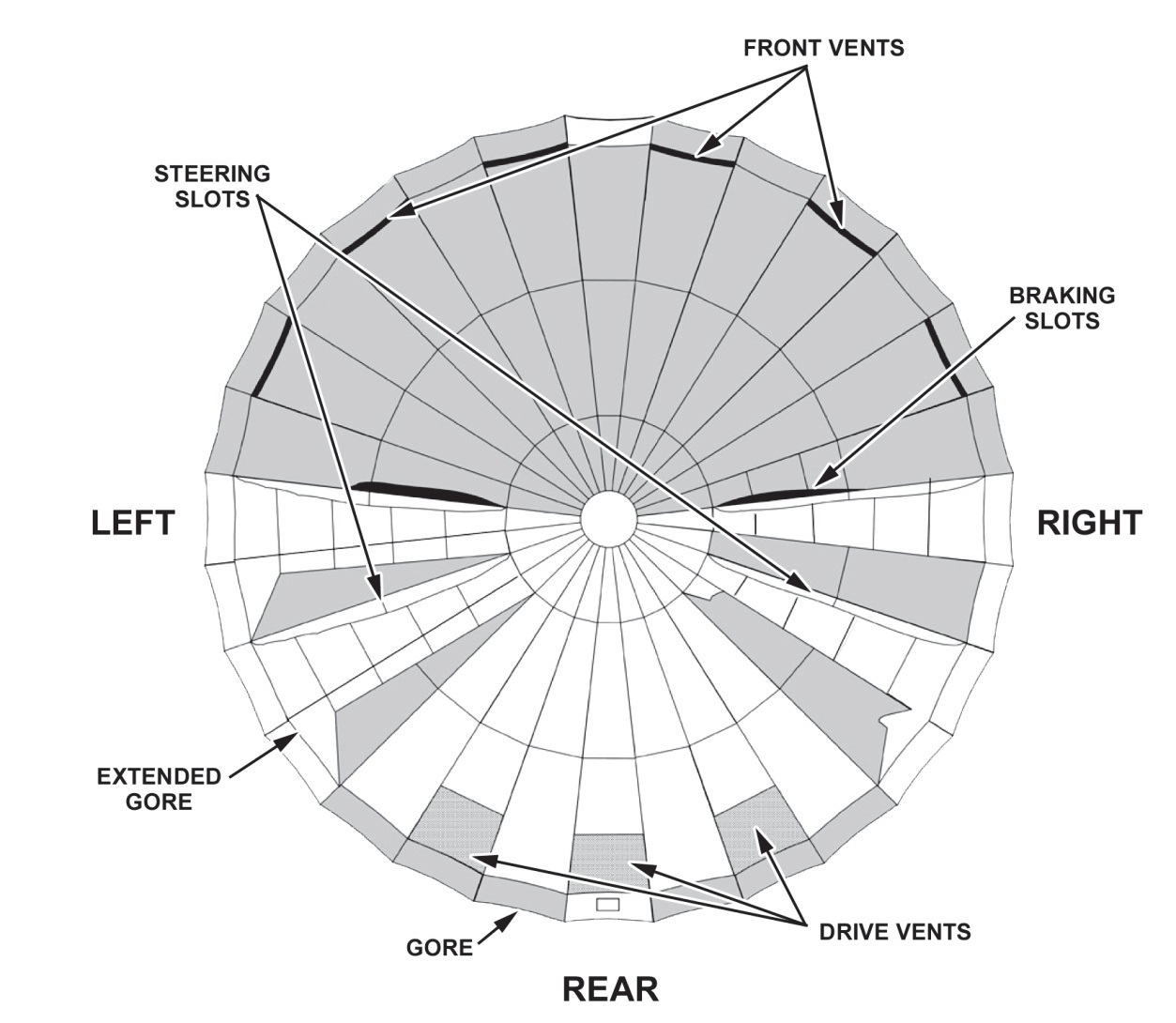
MC-6 Main Canopy Diagram

The MC-6 main canopy has a nominal diameter of 32 ft (9.8 m) at the skirt with a poly-conical shape and is constructed of low permeability nylon parachute cloth. There are 28 total gores, 24 standard gores made up of four sections each and four extended gores made up of nine (seven horizontal and two vertical) sections each. The anti-inversion netting is sewn to the skirt band of the canopy with suspension line attachment loops sewn to the netting.

There are six opening vents at the front of the canopy improving stability and the integrity of the canopy by allowing the increased air volume, due to the increased forward speed, to pass through instead of collapsing the front of the canopy during descent. The improved forward movement is provided by three drive vents at the rear of the canopy and mesh netting is sewn into these vents. A brake slot reduces forward drive and allows for the canopy to be maneuvered backwards. Control line toggles on the risers are attached to the lower control lines which reach the extended gores via attachment to the middle then upper control lines.

== Operation ==
=== Parachute Deployment ===
After exiting the aircraft, the jumper falls to the end of the static line pulling the curved pin from the pack-closing loop. The deployment bag is plucked from the pack tray breaking two connector link ties, extracting the suspension lines from the deployment bag. Two locking stows then disengage which release the canopy from the deployment bag until the canopy is stretched to its full length. The jumper's body weight then snaps a tie between the bridle loop at the apex of canopy and the static line allowing the canopy to begin to inflate, slowing the parachutist's rate of descent.

=== Canopy Manipulation ===
To turn the canopy, the parachutist pulls down the appropriate control line toggle which closes the attached extended gores. Closing the gores on one side of the parachute re-directs airflow through the extended gores on the opposite side of the canopy, rotating the canopy toward the closed gores. Pulling the right toggle turns the canopy right and pulling the left toggle turns the canopy left.

Braking is accomplished by pulling downward on both toggles simultaneously to one of the six braking positions: No Brake (toggles above head), One-Fourth Brake (toggles between eye and shoulder), One-Half Brake (toggles at chest level), Three-Fourths Brake (toggles between chest and waist), Full Brake (toggles at waist level), and Reverse Flight (toggles below waistline).

Proper steering and braking coupled with techniques such as "holding into the wind", "running with the wind", and "crabbing with the wind" during descent allow experienced parachutists to land at a desired point on the drop zone while reducing landing impact thus minimizing the risk of injury.

== Fielding ==
The Program Executive Office Soldier Clothing and Individual Equipment Program Manager reported that as of April 1, 2011, nearly 19,000 MC-6s had been fielded across the Army (15,780), Navy (675), Air Force (107) and USSOCOM (2,269) under the ATPS program. Australian Special Operations Command (SOCOMD) maintains the sole remaining parachute elements in the Australian Defence Force since the reclassification of 3rd Battalion, Royal Australian Regiment from an airborne to a light infantry role in 2011. SOCOMD sought replacements for their T-10 and MC1-1 parachutes, finally selecting the American T-11 and MC-6 parachutes.

== See also ==
- Australian Defence Force Parachuting School
- United States Army Airborne School
- United States Army Jumpmaster School
