= Ordnance QF 25-pounder Short =

Australian artillery gun of the Second World War

25-pounder Short Mark I
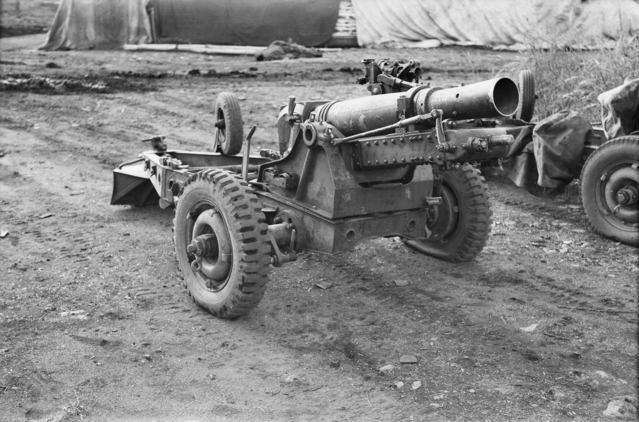
- An Ordnance QF 25-pounder Short in 1944
- Type: Field gun/howitzer
- Place of origin: Australia / United Kingdom

Service history
- In service: 1943–1946
- Used by: Australian Army
- Wars: Second World War

Production history
- Designed: 1942
- Unit cost: £A3,300
- Produced: 1943–1944
- No. built: 213

Specifications
- Mass: 1 long ton 6 cwt (2,900 lb or 1.3 t) gun and carriage
- Barrel length: 49.8 inches (1.26 m) (14.45 calibres)
- Crew: 6
- Shell: Various, with normal (3 charges) and super charge
- Shell weight: 25 pounds (11.3 kg)
- Calibre: 3.45 inches (87.6 mm)
- Breech: Vertical-sliding-wedge
- Recoil: Hydro-pneumatic, variable
- Carriage: Two wheel, box trail
- Elevation: -5° to +40°
- Traverse: 4° on carriage
- Rate of fire: 3-4 rpm
- Muzzle velocity: 1,230 feet per second (370 m/s) (using 3 charges)
- Effective firing range: 10,200 yd (9,300 m)
- Maximum firing range: 11,500 yd (10,500 m) using super charge

The Ordnance QF 25-pounder Short was an Australian variant of the British Ordnance QF 25-pounder field gun/howitzer optimised for jungle warfare in the Second World War. It was developed in 1942 and entered service with the Australian Army during 1943. The gun was used by several Royal Australian Artillery regiments during fighting in the South West Pacific Area, before being declared obsolete in 1946.

Modifications to the standard 25-pounder design were focused on reducing weight. They included using a shorter barrel and lighter carriage. These changes caused the gun to have inferior range, accuracy and rate of fire than the standard 25-pounder. The 25-pounder Short could be quickly broken down into 13 or 14 pieces to be transported in aircraft or jeeps.

The gun was disliked by artillerymen due to its severe backblast, which caused concussions and nosebleeds, as well as its lesser performance when compared to the standard 25-pounder. Several historians have written that the 25-pounder Short met the Army's requirements and its rapid development and production was a significant achievement by Australia's defence industry. They also note the gun's limitations and the concerns that were raised during the war.

== Background ==
=== Standard 25-pounder design ===
The Ordnance QF 25-pounder (Note: Quick-Firing, abbreviated to "QF", was British military terminology for artillery guns that used cartridge cases. 25-pounder referred to the weight of the shells the gun could fire, which was 25 pounds (11 kg).) was developed for the British Army during the late 1930s. It combined the capabilities of a field gun and a howitzer by being both highly mobile and fitted with a gun barrel that could fire at high elevations. The weapon was intended to replace both the QF 18-pounder gun and QF 4.5-inch howitzer that had equipped British Empire field artillery units during the First World War. The 25-pounder was adopted as the standard British field artillery weapon and large numbers were produced, including at least 12,253 in the United Kingdom. It proved highly successful, as the gun was robust, had a long range and could be used in a range of combat conditions.

Following the outbreak of the Second World War, the Second Australian Imperial Force (AIF) was formed for overseas service. The artillery component of each of the AIF's infantry divisions comprised three field regiments. (Note: Four AIF infantry divisions and an armoured division were raised between 1939 and 1941. In the early years of the war the AIF's infantry divisions were organised along British lines, and had an authorised strength of 12,967 men. By 1943, each standard infantry division was authorised approximately 17,000 men. As of 1941, Australian artillery regiments had an authorised strength of 24 guns and 427 men. Field regiments included three batteries. Each battery comprised two troops with four guns apiece.) Additional field regiments were assigned to higher commands, such as I Corps. This was consistent with the organisation of equivalent British Army units. Field artillery units supported the infantry and armoured components of divisions and were was equipped with guns that could be quickly moved. The Citizen Military Forces (CMF) militia units that remained in Australia and its territories also included artillery units.

=== Standard 25-pounders in Australian service ===
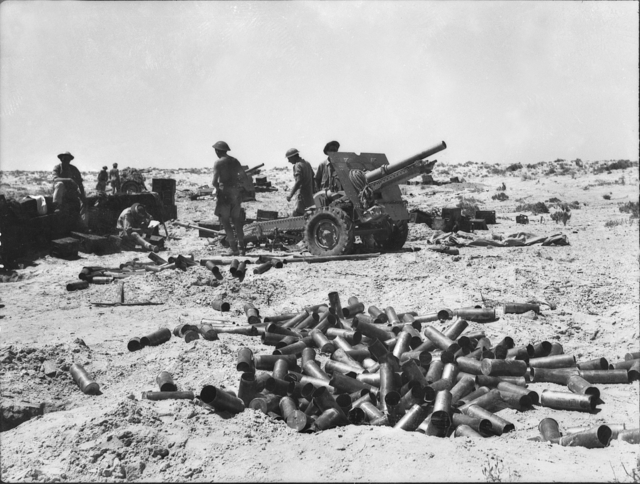
A standard 25-pounder of the Australian 2/8th Field Regiment during the First Battle of El Alamein in July 1942

The AIF's field regiments began to be equipped with British-built 25-pounder guns in 1940, either as a replacement for obsolete weapons or as their initial equipment upon being formed. By 1943, the gun was the standard equipment of the Australian Army's field artillery units.

In January 1940, the Australian Government approved a proposal to build 25-pounders in Australia. A government-owned factory was constructed at Maribyrnong in Melbourne. Almost all the guns' components were manufactured in Australia, with nearly 200 firms providing parts. Two companies were appointed to coordinate these suppliers and also assemble some of the guns; Charles Ruwolt Pty Ltd in the state of Victoria and General Motors-Holden in New South Wales. The first Australian-built 25-pounder was completed in May 1941 and 1,527 were delivered by the time production ceased at the end of 1943. Approximately 500 British-built 25-pounders were also acquired. The designs of artillery guns that were manufactured in Australia typically included minor variations from the original British weapons due to the local availability of materials or the requirements of the Australian military. Australian industry was also capable of developing major changes to British designs. In 1942, Charles Ruwolt engineers redesigned the 25-pounder's recoil system so that these guns could be fitted to the Australian-designed Sentinel tank.

The 25-pounder was well suited to the open conditions the Army experienced in the Middle East theatre but was difficult to deploy in dense jungle terrain. While the developed road network in Malaya allowed it to be moved by vehicles during the Malayan Campaign, the extremely rugged terrain and limited transport infrastructure in New Guinea meant that the guns could only be moved away from coastal plains and airfields by manhandling. To facilitate this, gun crews in New Guinea reduced the weight of their 25-pounders by removing extraneous parts including the gun shield. Moving guns in this way was a slow and labour-intensive process and they were unable to keep pace with the movement of infantry. As a result, Australian troops often had no artillery support heavier than 3-inch mortars during the New Guinea Campaign in 1942.

== Concept and development ==
AIF gunners manhandling a standard 25-pounder in New Guinea during October 1942

The difficulty of deploying artillery in New Guinea led to a need for a pack gun which could be broken down into relatively light parts and transported by aircraft or jeeps. The Army's only such weapons were four British 3.7-inch mountain howitzers, which had been obtained from New Zealand in 1942 and issued to the 1st Mountain Battery. Australia requested M116 75mm pack howitzers from the United States but none were immediately available. As an expedient, the Army decided to re-equip three artillery regiments with large-calibre ML 4.2-inch mortars.

David Dexter, the official historian of the Australian Army's campaigns in 1943 and 1944, credited two officers from the 2/2nd Field Regiment with first suggesting that a lightened version of the 25-pounder be developed. Other sources attribute this to the Army's Director of Artillery, Brigadier John O'Brien. In September 1942, O'Brien suggested that a variant of the 25-pounder be developed to meet the requirement for highly portable artillery. His proposal was approved, and all development work was conducted in Australia by the Army, the Ordnance Production Directorate and Charles Ruwolt. The three organisations collaborated closely so that the weapon could be quickly fielded; this included integrating the process of designing the gun with planning how they would be manufactured. This work began in September 1942 and an acceptable design was ready by January the next year. O'Brien had been an experienced engineer in civilian life and personally drafted the early design diagrams.

== Design ==
The new gun used as many standard 25-pounder parts as possible, but included a number of major differences to reduce the weapon's weight. The historian Ian V. Hogg described these changes as "radical surgery". Modifications included shortening the gun's barrel and recuperator, fitting smaller wheels, substituting a large spade for the platform which allowed the gun to be rotated and incorporating the recoil system which had been developed for the Sentinel tank. (Note: The buffer and recuperator of 25-pounder guns absorbed some of the recoil when the weapon was fired and then returned and held the gun at firing position. They operated on hydraulic and hydropneumatic principles respectively. The gun barrel was mounted on these parts within the cradle.) The gun carriage was very different from that of the standard 25-pounder, and included a new cradle, trail and axles. (Note: The trail was the rearmost section of the gun carriage and could be used to adjust the elevation so the gun could be fired at different angles. The cradle was the combination of the gun barrel and the system attached to it to moderate the recoil when the weapon was fired.) The guns were initially fitted with stabilisers to reduce stress on their wheels when firing, but these were later removed as they caused problems when reversing or moving the guns in action. The prototype was fitted with a gun shield, but this was later removed and not included in the production weapons.

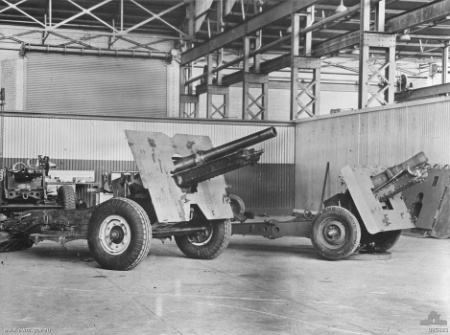
Standard (left) and Short (right) 25-pounders. The gun shield on this Short prototype was removed on production weapons.

The 25-pounder Short incorporated a number of features to increase its mobility. The gun could be broken down into 13 or 14 parts (Note: Some handbooks for the gun specified it could be broken down into 13 parts and others put the number at 14.) in under two minutes, allowing it to be air-dropped from aircraft or packed into jeeps. Of these parts, only the recuperator and front trail weighed more than 135 kilograms (300 lb). Assembled guns could also be towed by a jeep, which was considered advantageous as it was possible to transport these vehicles inside aircraft. In 1943, the Army told the media that 25-pounder Shorts could be disassembled in 90 seconds and reassembled in 145 seconds.

Test firing of the prototype 25-pounder Short began on 10 December 1942. The 2/1st Field Regiment also trialled the gun in New Guinea during early 1943. It was found that the shortened barrel meant that muzzle flash burned the recoil system. A conical flash shroud was added to the muzzle of the gun to solve this problem.

The 25-pounder Short had a maximum range approximately 87 percent that of the standard gun. It could use three standard explosive charges to obtain a range of up to 10,200 yards (9,300 m). The range could be extended to 11,500 yards (10,500 m) if a super charge was used, though standing instructions warned against doing so except in emergencies due to the strain this placed on the gun carriage. (Note: The maximum range using three standard charges differs between sources. Official historian David Paver Mellor wrote in 1958 that it was 10,400 yards (9,500 m). The former Australian Army gunner and historian Steve Gower put it at 10,200 yards (9,300 m) in 1981.) The gun could fire the same ammunition as the standard 25-pounder; namely high explosive, armour-piercing, smoke, gas, propaganda leaflet and illumination shells. The rate of fire was three or four rounds per minute, compared to five rounds per minute for the standard 25-pounder. The Short guns were also less accurate.

== Production ==
Commonwealth Munitions Factory workers inspecting a 25-pounder Short before it formed part of a parade through Melbourne in October 1943

The production variant of the 25-pounder Short weighed 1 long ton 6 cwt (2,900 lb or 1.3 t), compared to 1 long ton 15 cwt 3 qr (4,000 lb or 1.82 t) for the standard gun. Like the standard 25-pounder, each Short gun had a crew of six. As completed, the gun's full designation was Ordnance QF 25-pounder Short (Aust) Mark I, but it was nicknamed the "snort" by Australian soldiers. The weapon has also been referred to as the "baby" 25-pounder.

The Army placed an initial order for 112 guns and large-scale production began in early 1943. During initial operational service, it was found that these guns suffered from excessive wheel bounce when fired. Several solutions to this problem were considered, including fitting the guns with tyres manufactured in Australia for Bristol Beaufort bomber aircraft. In the end, the Mark II carriage was developed with larger wheels and tyres and larger stabilising elements. It also included a castor wheel on the trail of the gun to make it easier to handle. A further order of 100 guns was placed, with all incorporating the Mark II carriage. The guns with Mark I carriages were modified. Altogether, 212 guns were manufactured by the end of production in 1944. With the addition of the prototype, the total output was 213 guns. The cost to produce each weapon in 1944 was £A3,300. (Note: A standardised "basket" of goods and services worth £A3,300 in Australia in 1944 would cost $A293,860.38 in 2025.)

Some Australian soldiers raised concerns over the quality of the 25-pounder Shorts they operated. In September 1943, the commander of the 2/4th Field Regiment rejected a batch of 25-pounder Shorts sent to his unit in the belief that they had been either poorly manufactured or sabotaged. These guns were returned to Australia and inspected, where it was concluded that most of the criticisms were unfounded, but one of the guns was discovered to have incorrect markings on its rangefinder. A 25-pounder Short with the same defect was detected in 1944. In contrast, the Australian-built standard 25-pounders were considered well made by gunners.

The British Army evaluated the 25-pounder Short and ordered a similar design. It had a different recoil system to the Australian guns to allow super charge to be used and was designated the Ordnance QF 25-pounder Mark IV. Design work was completed in May 1945, by which time there was no longer a need for the gun. One or two were produced and the British Army declared the type obsolete in 1946.

== Service ==
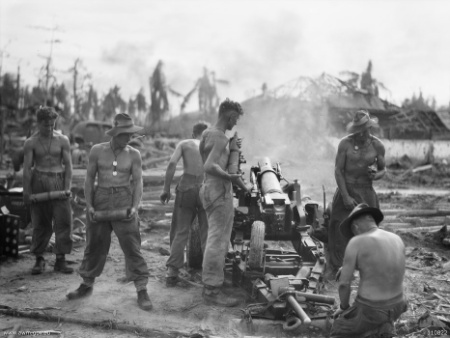
Gunners of the 2/4th Field Regiment fire a 25-pounder Short at Japanese positions during the Battle of Balikpapan in July 1945

=== Allocation ===
All three remaining AIF infantry divisions (one having been destroyed in combat) and three of the six CMF infantry divisions were converted to the jungle division structure in 1943. This was a light infantry structure optimised for combat in rugged terrain. It was expected that the divisions would engage Japanese forces at short ranges and be dependent on air and sea transport. As a result, efforts were made to "lighten" each division in comparison to the standard divisional structure by reducing the amount of equipment it was issued and eliminating as many administrative positions as possible. (Note: Each jungle division was initially authorised 13,118 men, around 4,000 fewer than standard divisions.) The jungle divisions' artillery component was focused on supporting infantry. Long-range bombardment was to be handled by the Allied air forces and navies. Each jungle division was permanently assigned a single field regiment, with others being held in reserve and attached to infantry units as needed. The rationale for reducing the divisional artillery was the difficulty of moving guns in jungle terrain.

25-pounder Short guns were first issued to front-line artillery regiments in August 1943 as part of this reorganisation. One of each field regiment's three batteries was re-equipped with the new guns. Field batteries equipped with the guns normally consisted of a headquarters and two troops. Each troop was equipped with four guns, seven jeeps and a D6 tractor. The guns were usually transported in jeeps, along with ammunition. The D6 tractor carried 88 rounds of ammunition. The usual practice was to allocate a field battery from the regiment to each of the division's three infantry brigades.

From June 1944, the artillery complement of each of the jungle divisions other than the 5th Division was expanded from one to two or three field regiments. This change reflected the Army's greater use of artillery to minimise its casualties when attacking Japanese defensive positions. Each field regiment continued to comprise two batteries equipped with standard 25-pounders and one with 25-pounder Shorts.

During the period the 25-pounder Short was under development, the Army received thirty-eight M116 75mm pack howitzers and deployed some to New Guinea. These guns were mainly used in supplementary roles, as the 25-pounder Short met the Army's requirement for portable artillery. The commander of New Guinea Force's artillery, Brigadier L.E.S. Barker, preferred the 75mm pack howitzer to the 25-pounder Short, and tried to prevent the new gun being issued. He was overruled by O'Brien. Barker accepted this decision.

=== Combat service ===
The guns were first operationally deployed by the 7th Division during the landing at Nadzab in the Territory of New Guinea. On 5 September 1943, a 32-man detachment and two guns from the 2/4th Field Regiment were dropped by parachute from Douglas C-47 Skytrain transports to provide artillery support for American paratroopers who also landed in this area. One gun was assembled and ready to fire within an hour, but the buffer and recuperator of the other took two days to locate in the long grass. The guns were not fired as there were no Japanese forces in the Nadzab area.

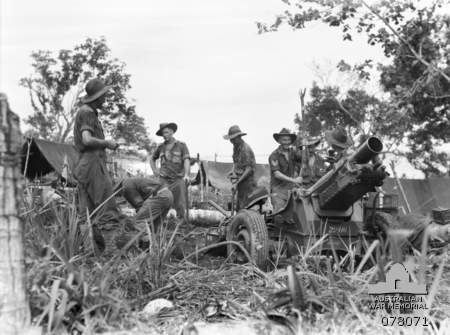
Gunners from the 2/3rd Field Regiment prepare a 25-pounder Short for firing near Danmap, New Guinea, in January 1945

The 9th Division employed the 25-pounder Short in combat during the September 1943 landing at Lae and subsequent operation to capture Lae township. The guns were disliked by some of the division's gunners due to their inaccuracy and strong muzzle blast. The 9th Division's staff officers regarded them as a success though, as the guns could be readily transported on small vehicles, boats and sledges. Jeeps proved to be unsatisfactory gun tractors. The 7th Division's 25-pounder Shorts were used during the fighting in the Ramu Valley in October. On one occasion, a single gun was transported through difficult terrain to support the 2/27th Battalion and suppressed several Japanese artillery guns that fired on the Australian infantry.

The 25-pounder Short was used by some Australian artillery units in New Guinea, the Solomon Islands and Borneo until the end of the war. During the Battle of Pearl Ridge in Bougainville during December 1944, a battery of eight 25-pounder Shorts from the 4th Field Regiment supported the advancing Australian infantry until they moved beyond the range of these guns. They were then replaced by standard 25-pounders which the personnel of the regiment's three batteries crewed in rotation. A battery of 25-pounder Shorts was the first artillery ashore during the 7th Division's landing at Balikpapan in Borneo on 1 July 1945.

Following the end of the Second World War the Australian Army and its artillery force were greatly reduced in size. Senior members of the Royal Australian Artillery decided in April 1946 that the post-war Army did not require specialised mountain artillery units. The 25-pounder Short was declared obsolete in 1946 and removed from service. The Army's regular units were equipped with standard 25-pounders until the early 1960s and reserve units retained the guns until 1975. The Australian self-propelled standard 25-pounder, the Yeramba self-propelled gun, was developed during 1949 and 1950 and used by the Army until 1957.

== Assessments ==
Gunners from the 2/14th Field Regiment manhandling a 25-pounder Short gun up a steep incline in New Guinea during February 1944

The 25-pounder Short was disliked by the gunners who used it. It was particularly unpopular among members of AIF artillery units which had used the standard 25-pounder during the fighting in the Middle East. Some infantry officers also preferred to receive support from standard 25-pounders. The lack of a gun shield and the shortened barrel exposed gun crews to a severe backblast each time the gun was fired. As a result, gunners often suffered mild concussions and nosebleeds by the end of fire missions. Guns were sometimes put out of action by damage caused by the absorption of violent recoil. The gun also had a tendency to tilt at low elevation; this was remedied by its crew standing on the trails, an expedient that had previously been used with the QF 4.5-inch Howitzer. The 25-pounder Short's reduced range was a significant deficiency when compared to the regular 25-pounder. Other limitations included the low rate of fire and difficulties towing the weapon. As a result of its experience with the gun, the 9th Division recommended that they be pooled and reserved for their specialised role rather than be routinely used alongside the standard 25-pounder.

Post-war assessments of the gun's performance are generally positive. In his volume of the Australian official history covering science and industry, which was published in 1958, David Paver Mellor acknowledged that there were "extremely divergent views" of the 25-pounder Short's qualities. He attributed much of the criticism to a misunderstanding of the gun's specialised role, for which some trade-offs in performance had been needed. Mellor concluded that "whatever the gun's shortcomings may have been they appear to have been outweighed by its good points".

In 1981, the historian and Australian Army gunner Steve Gower observed that the 25-pounder Short was "undoubtedly one of the more significant Australian weapon developments of the Second World War". He judged that it was a successful adaptation of a foreign-designed weapon to meet the Australian Army's requirements. As part of a book covering the experiences of Australian soldiers, historian Mark Johnston commented in 1996 that the main reason gunners disliked the 25-pounder Short was that "they loved the standard 25-pounder". British historian Chris Henry wrote in 2002 that the 25-pounder Short "gave good service, and was robust enough to survive life in the jungle even though many modifications were needed". In 2014 Australian historian Adrian Threlfall noted the shortcomings of the gun, but stated that its rapid development and introduction into service was an example of the Army's success in adapting to jungle warfare. Writing in 2017, the Australian military historian Jeffrey Grey concurred with Mellor's judgements and observed that the 25-pounder Short "was not a perfect weapon, but a compromise born of an urgent situation".

== Surviving examples ==
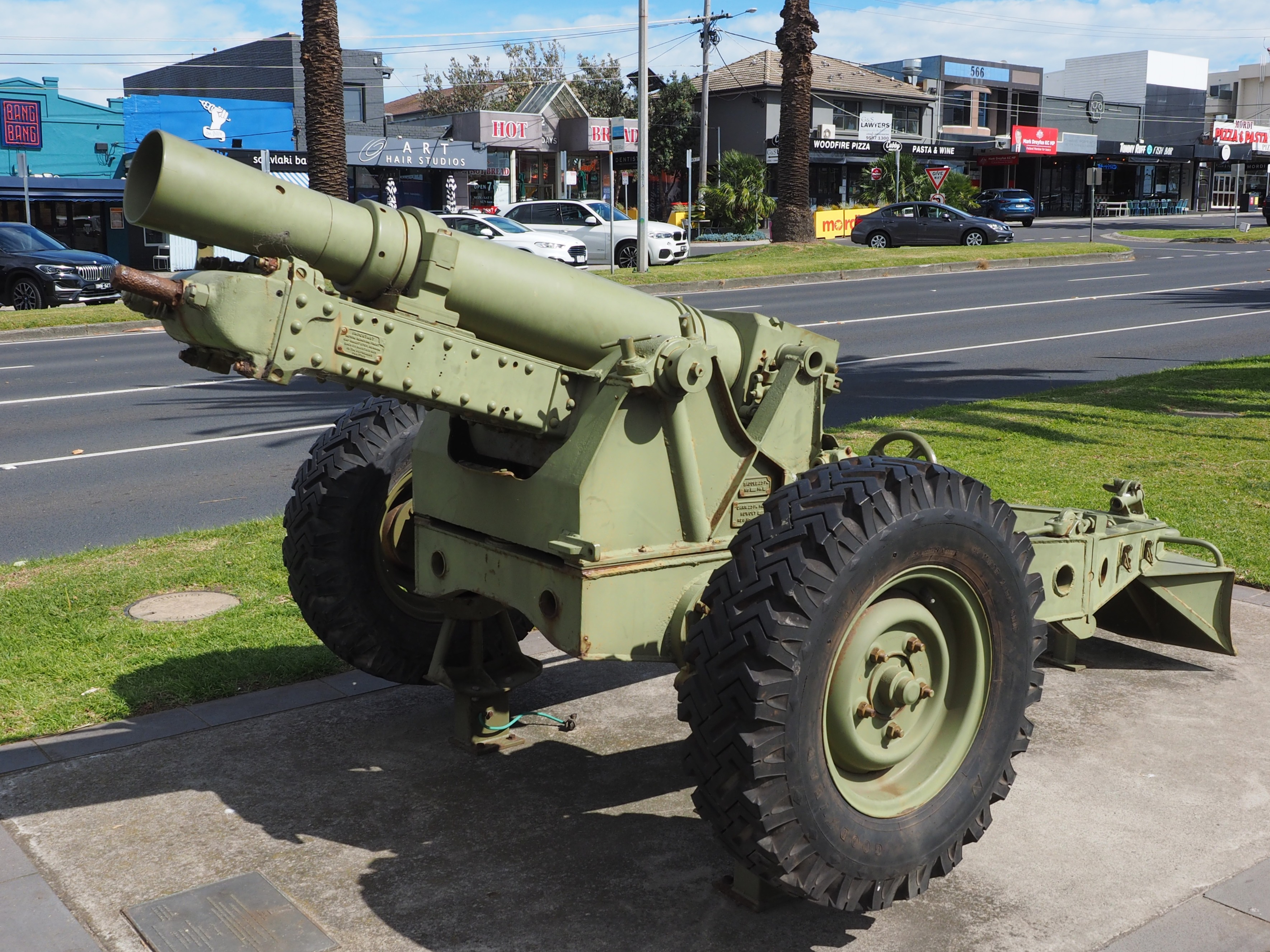
One of the QF 25-pounder Short guns on display at Mordialloc in Melbourne

Several 25-pounder Shorts survive. Two form part of a war memorial in Mordialloc, a suburb of Melbourne. Other examples include guns preserved at Manly in Sydney, Eugowra, New South Wales, Cargo, New South Wales and the Australian Armour and Artillery Museum at Cairns. As of 1992, one of the guns was held by the Royal Australian Army Ordnance Corps Museum in Bandiana, Victoria.
