= Paratroop Training Unit RAAF =

Paratroop Training Unit
- Active: 1942-1945
- Country: Australia
- Branch: Royal Australian Air Force
- Role: Parachute training

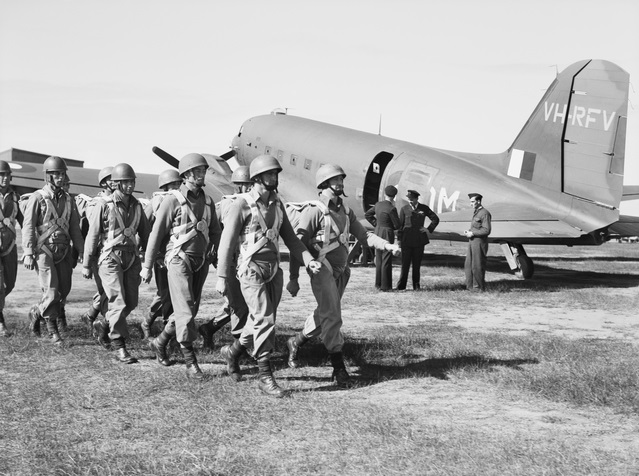
Trainee Australian Army paratroopers march to a Douglas Dakota C-47B

The Paratroop Training Unit (PTU) was a unit of the Royal Australian Air Force (RAAF) during World War II, which served as the instruction centre for recruitment and training of the Australian Army paratroopers. Trainees mostly came from the 1st Parachute Battalion and Z Special Unit.

The unit was formed on 3 November 1942 at RAAF Laverton, Victoria and moved to RAAF Station Tocumwal, New South Wales on 16 November 1942 to be co-located with the Army's fledgling parachute unit which later became 1st Parachute Battalion. The unit was under the command of Wing Commander P Glasscock. The PTU had a nominal strength of 6 officers and 88 airmen from the RAAF and 7 officers and 90 other ranks from the Army. After the unit moved to Tocumwal it received fifty statichute parachutes in late November. In December 1942, the first course with 40 trainees began with the first descents made on 19 January 1943 from a Douglas DC-2. In March 1943, experimental water descents were made into Swan Hill Lakes. In the same month the 1st Parachute Battalion was formed. Five courses were conducted at Tocumwal which was found to be unsuitable due to its weather conditions and the lack of training facilities. The basic course involved four descents with trainees equipped with a reserve parachute for the first descent.

The PTU relocated to RAAF Base Richmond, New South Wales on 6 April 1943 under the command of Wing Commander W Wetton. Richmond provided better facilities and descents were made from a Douglas Dakota C-47. Major Roberts from the British Parachute Regiment and Royal Air Force Parachute Jump Master Squadron Leader Wetton arrived from England to provide advice on parachute training. In May 1943, the PTU received permission to use Cataract Reservoir for day and nighttime descents with a parachute drying room built in early 1944. Group 244 RAAF was attached to the unit which included members of the Women's Auxiliary Australian Air Force (WAAAF) for No 1 Mobile Parachute Maintenance Unit formed in August 1943, and a C-47 from No. 36 Squadron together with aircrew. Group 244 RAAF had a nominal strength of 20 officers and 157 airmen from the RAAF and 2 officers and 94 airwomen from the WAAAF. The basic course at Richmond involved seven descents after which parachute wings were awarded. After the relocation to Richmond the use of a reserve parachute for the first descent was discontinued. In November 1943, the first jumpmaster course was commenced. The PTU also provided training in supply dropping for members of the Australian Army Service Corps.

Parachute training stopped in August 1945. The unit was disbanded on 21 December 1945. A total of 19,782 descents, 3,130 dummy drops and 3,622 supply drops had been made at the unit.
