= Lincoln Town Car =

Full-size luxury sedan (1980–2011)

Overview
- Manufacturer: Lincoln (Ford)
- Production: 1980–2011
- Model years: 1981–2011

Body and chassis
- Class: Full-size luxury car
- Layout: FR layout
- Platform: Ford Panther platform
- Chassis: Body-on-frame
- Related: Mercury Grand Marquis; Ford Crown Victoria; Ford LTD Crown Victoria

Chronology
- Predecessor: Lincoln Continental (1980)

The Lincoln Town Car is a model line of full-size luxury sedans that was marketed and produced by the Lincoln division of the American automaker Ford Motor Company. Deriving its name from a limousine body style, Lincoln marketed the Town Car from 1981 to 2011, with the nameplate previously serving as the flagship trim of the Lincoln Continental. Produced across three generations for thirty model years, the Town Car was marketed directly against luxury sedans from Cadillac and Chrysler.

Marketed nearly exclusively as a four-door sedan (a two-door sedan was offered for 1981 only), many examples of the Town Car were used for fleet and livery (limousine) service. From 1983 to its 2011 discontinuation, the Town Car was the longest car produced by Ford worldwide, becoming the longest mass-production car sold in North America from 1997 to 2011. While not a direct successor of the Town Car, the Lincoln MKS would become the longest American sedan until 2016 (overtaken by the Cadillac CT6).

From 1980 until 2007, the Lincoln Town Car was assembled in Wixom, Michigan (Wixom Assembly) alongside the Lincoln Continental, LS, and Mark VI, VII, and VIII. After Wixom's closure, Town Car production moved to Southwold, Ontario (St. Thomas Assembly) alongside the similar Ford Crown Victoria and the Mercury Grand Marquis. The final Lincoln Town Car was produced on August 29, 2011.

Within the Lincoln model line, the Town Car was not directly replaced; the nameplate was used from 2012 to 2019 to denote livery/limousine/hearse variants of the Lincoln MKT. For 2017, the revived Continental replaced the MKS, closely matching the Town Car in wheelbase and width.

== Background ==
=== Etymology ===
In the 1900s–1920s, a town car was a vehicle design that transitioned from horse-drawn carriages to limousines (functionally similar to the brougham). The design featured an open chauffeur's compartment with an enclosed rear cabin for the passengers. In French, the term "de Ville" described the design as "for town (use)", as such automobiles had few provisions for carrying luggage; the design was Anglicized as "town car" or "town brougham" (with Brougham adopted as a popular trim level during the 1970s and 1980s).

In 1922, Edsel Ford purchased a custom-built Lincoln L-Series town car as a personal vehicle for his father, Henry Ford.

In 1949, Cadillac introduced the Coupe de Ville, followed by the Sedan de Ville in 1956. Though not adopting the namesake design, the Cadillac de Ville series became the primary rival of Lincoln for the second half of the 20th century.

=== Continental Town Car ===
Prior to becoming a stand-alone model line for 1981, the Town Car nameplate saw use for two different generations of Lincoln Continental sedans.

==== 1959–1960 ====
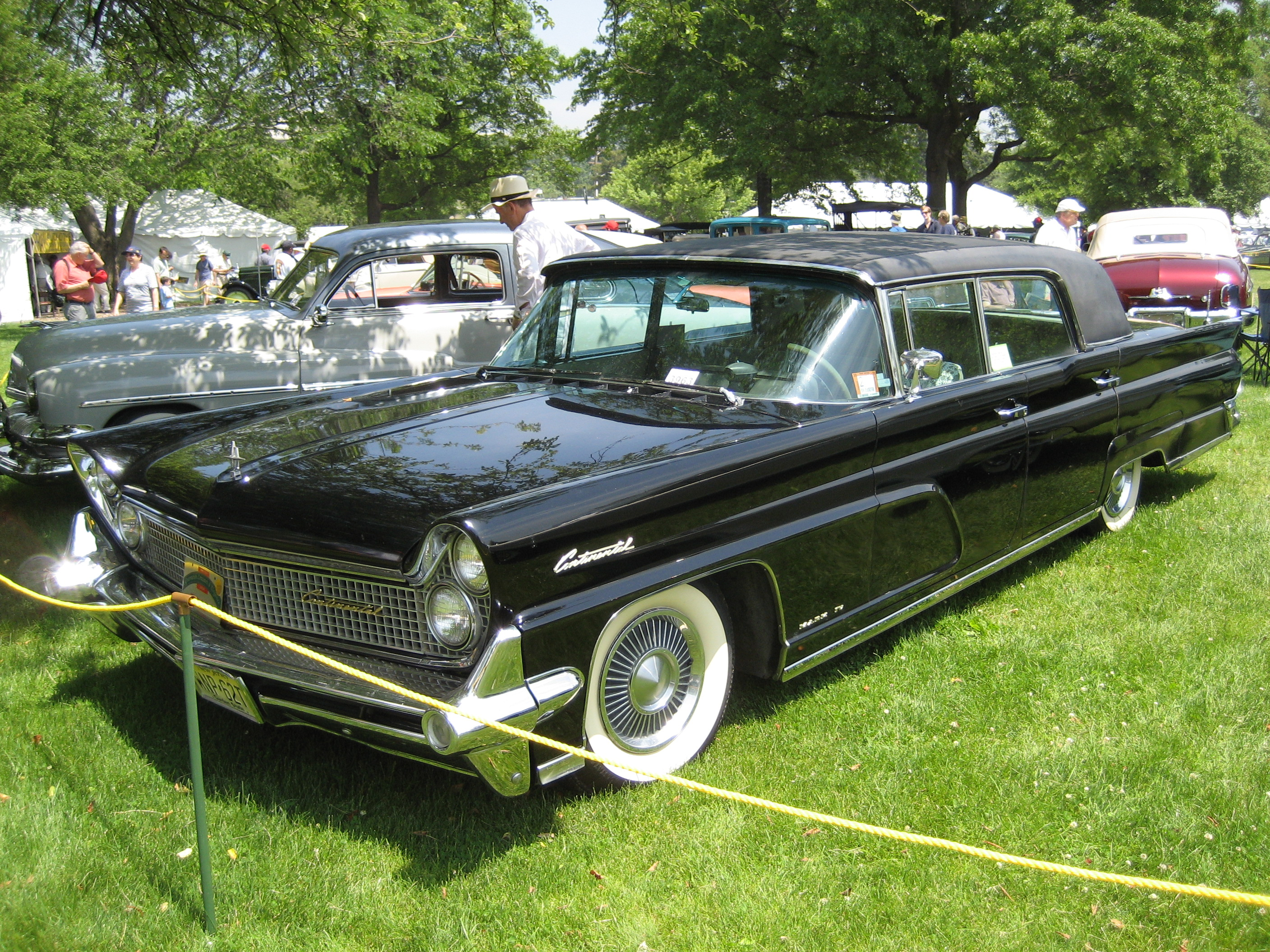
1959 Continental Mark IV Town Car formal sedan (1 of 214 produced)

For 1959, Lincoln augmented its flagship Continental line, adding the Town Car and Limousine formal sedans above the Mark IV; the vehicles were jointly manufactured by Lincoln and coachbuilder Hess and Eisenhardt. In contrast to the standard Mark IV, the Town Car/Limousine underwent several major design changes. For 1960, the two vehicles adopted the Lincoln Continental nameplate.

While the doors were retained, the Mark-series reverse-slant roofline was replaced by a formal-styled C-pillar, covered by a fully padded vinyl top and inset rear window (fixed in place); the hardtop roofline gave way to a fixed B-pillar (the frameless door glass remained). In addition to adding more conservative styling, the redesigned roofline was a functional change, as it allowed the rear seat to be repositioned to increase legroom without any modification to the wheelbase.

The Town Car was developed for use as an owner-driven vehicle; the Limousine was to be chauffeur-driven, adding a retractable glass partition behind the front seat. The variants were offered with every Continental option included as standard equipment (including air conditioning). Town Cars were fitted with broadcloth upholstery for both seats; Limousines were fitted with leather-upholstered front seats. In addition to being specified with identical features, all Town Cars and Limousines were painted Presidential Black.

Production of the Town Car and Limousine was limited by Ford to two vehicles daily, leading the models to become among the rarest vehicles ever built by Ford Motor Company. In total, 214 Town Cars and 83 Limousines were built during 1959 and 1960.

==== 1970–1979 ====
For 1970, Lincoln revived the Town Car name, reintroducing it as a trim package option for the Lincoln Continental, featuring leather seating surfaces and deeper cut-pile carpeting. For 1971, the brand commemorated its fiftieth anniversary by marketing a limited-edition Golden Anniversary Lincoln Continental Town Car; 1500 were produced.

For 1972, the Town Car name returned permanently, becoming a flagship sub-model of the Continental line. Taking from its name heritage, nearly all examples of the Continental Town Car were specified with a vinyl top that covered the rear half of the roof (a full-length top was optional); to incorporate coach lamps on the B-pillars, a raised molding was included, also marking the transition between the metal and vinyl roof. A two-door variant of the Town Car, named the Town Coupe, was introduced for 1973, featuring nearly the same roof design. When Lincoln redesigned the roofline of the Continental for 1975, the Town Car was fitted with the oval opera windows from the Mark IV coupe; the Town Coupe received a large rectangular opera window.

The Continental Town Car proved to be a success for the division, becoming the most popular Lincoln vehicle of the 1970s (as the Mark IV and Mark V were not technically branded as Lincolns).

(Lincoln) Continental Town Cars: 1959–1960, 1970–1979

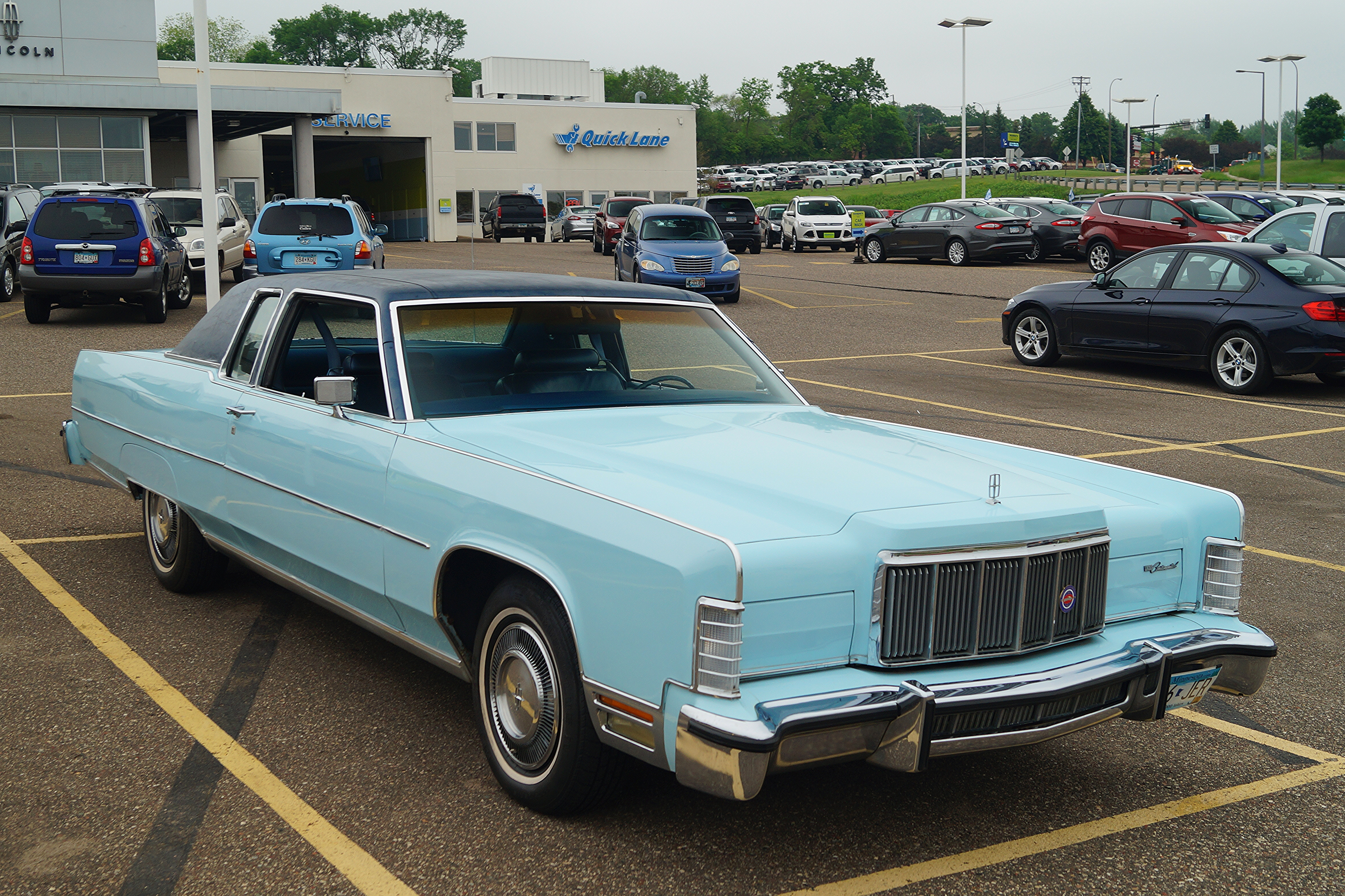
1976 Lincoln Town Coupe (two-door version)

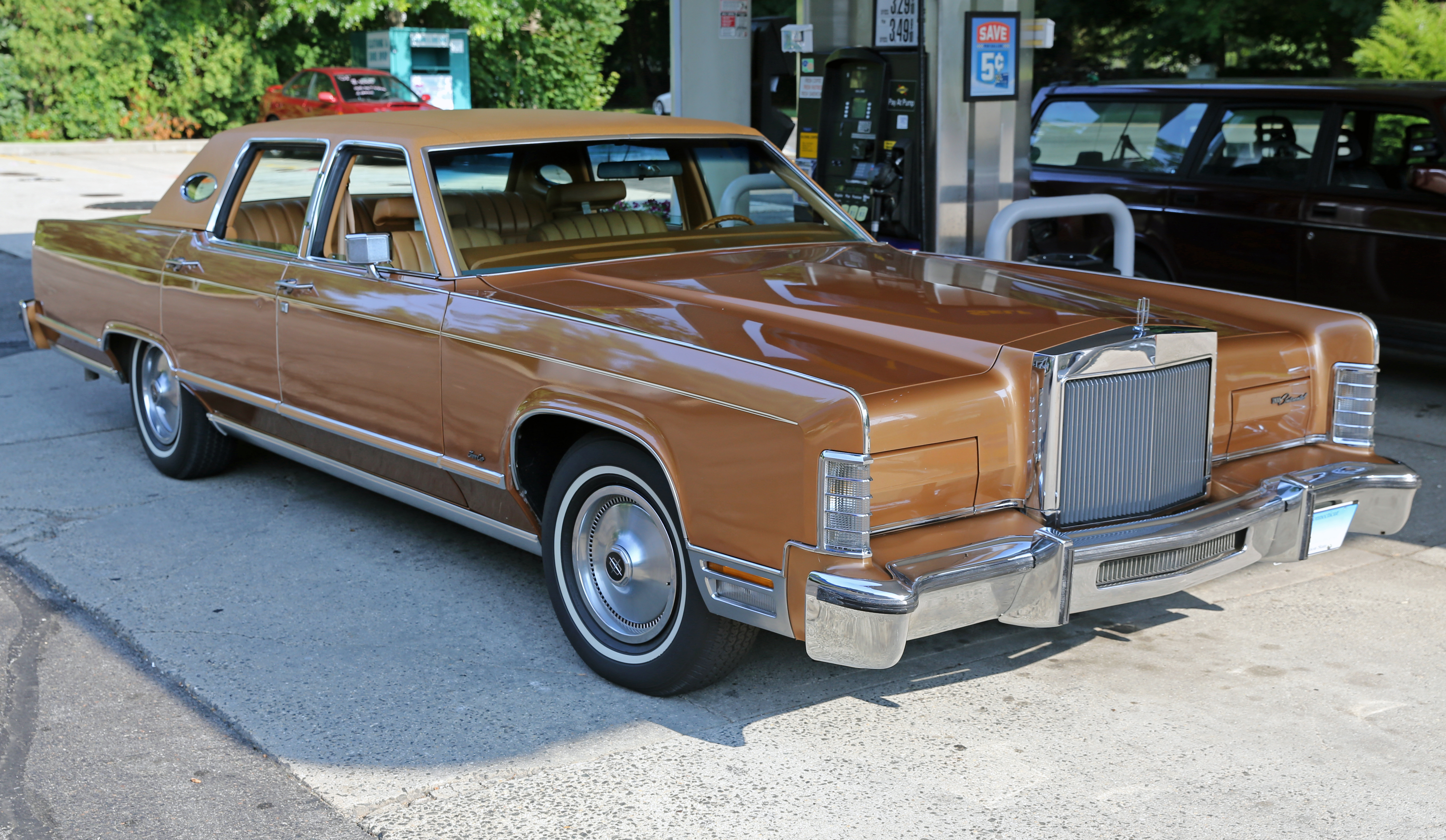
1978 Lincoln Continental Town Car

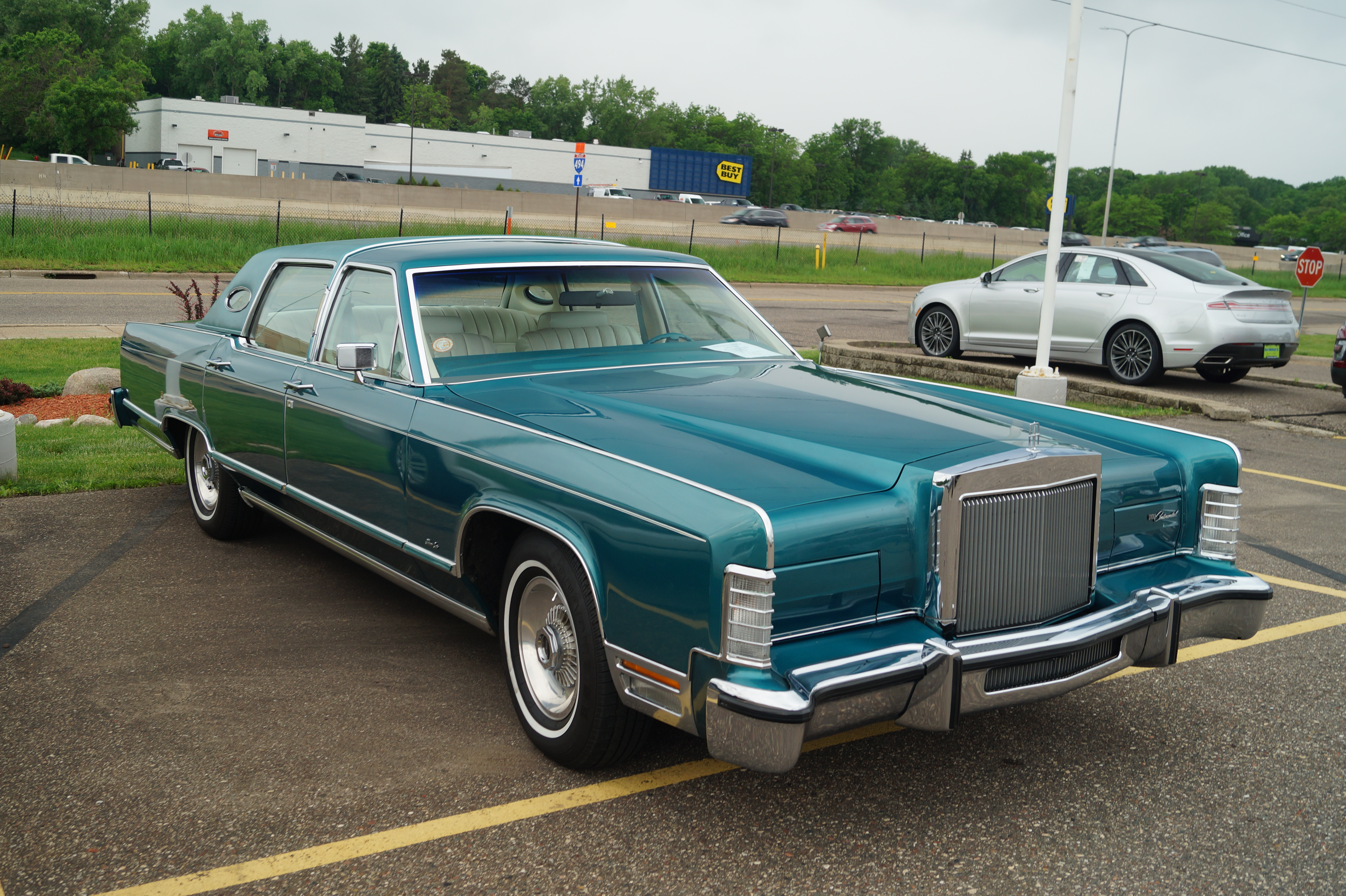
1979 Lincoln Continental Town Car

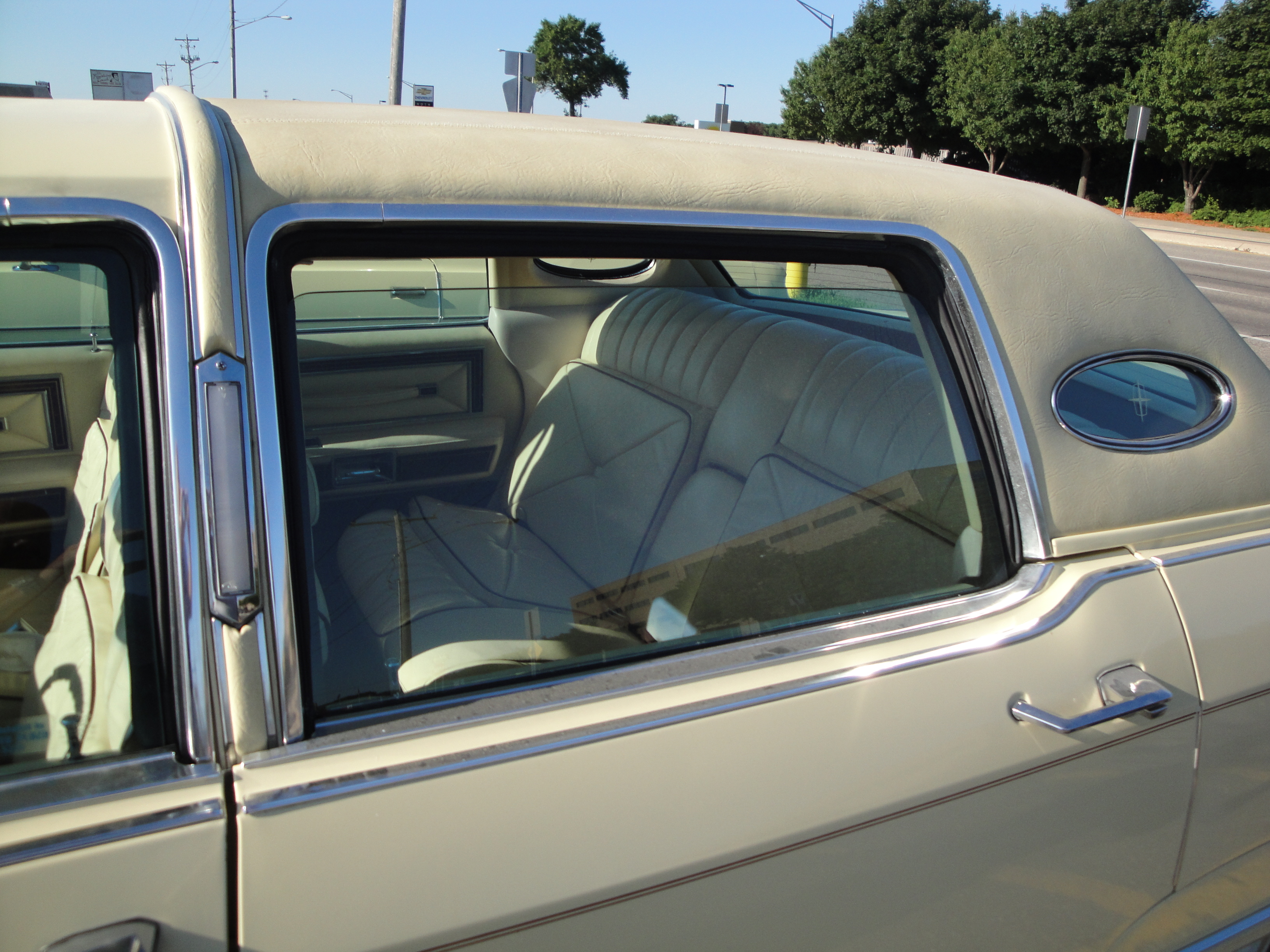
Closeup image of rear roofline of a 1977 Lincoln Continental Town Car, showing padded rear vinyl roof and opera windows

==== 1980 ====
For 1980, Lincoln became the final American brand to market downsized full-size cars; in addition to doing so nearly four years after Cadillac, Lincoln trailed Ford and sister division Mercury by a year. However, the redesign shifted the brand from marketing the largest production sedan in North America to giving it a smaller exterior footprint than either Cadillac or Chrysler. The Continental Town Car returned for 1980, again serving as the flagship trim of the Lincoln Continental.

Alongside the downsizing of the Lincoln Continental, Ford replaced the Continental Mark V for 1980 with the smaller Mark VI. The first all-new generation of the Mark Series since 1972, the Mark VI shared its chassis and much of the body with the Continental to reduce development and production costs; a four-door sedan was designed to attract additional customers. In line with preceding generations of the Mark Series, the Mark VI was officially branded as a Continental and marketed and supported through Lincoln-Mercury.

In spite of bringing downsized full-size sedans to production to meet high consumer demand, from a marketing standpoint, the 1980 update of the Lincoln model line would prove catastrophic. In early 1980, the slow-selling Lincoln Versailles mid-size sedan was quietly retired; as before 1977, Lincoln again offered solely full-size cars, with nothing to sell against European-brand luxury vehicles. The deletion of the Versailles also left Lincoln to market three versions of the same model line, as the Continental, Continental Town Car/Town Coupe, and Mark VI differed little in appearance.

For 1981, Lincoln's model line underwent a revision to transition its full-size model range from three nameplates to one, commencing a multi-year transition throughout all three Ford divisions. All full-size Lincolns (introduced for 1980) became Lincoln Town Cars; the Lincoln Continental nameplate went on hiatus for the model year, reappearing on an all-new mid-size sedan for 1982 (not replacing the Versailles). The Mark VI remained in production, ending its model cycle after the 1983 model year; the mid-size Mark VII that replaced it for 1984 represented a near-complete break from design tradition for the Mark Series.

== First generation (1981–1989) ==
First generation
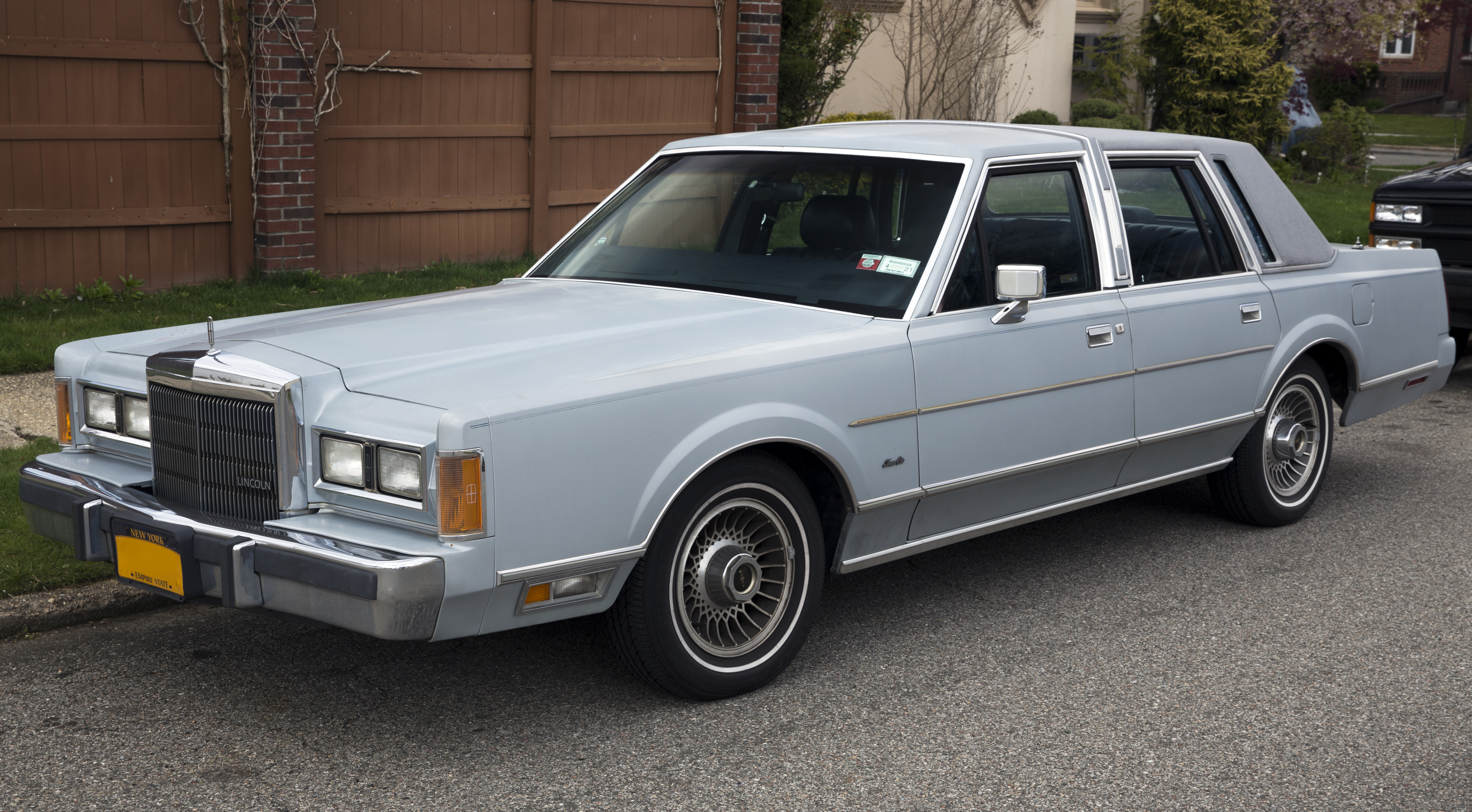
- 1988 Lincoln Town Car (base)

Overview
- Also called: Lincoln Continental (1980)
- Production: 1980–1989
- Model years: 1981–1989
- Assembly: United States: Wixom, Michigan (Wixom Assembly Plant)
- Designer: Gale Halderman(1976); Ed Golden and Victor Nacif (mid cycle refresh: 1983)

Body and chassis
- Body style: 4-door sedan 2-door sedan (1981 only)
- Related: Continental Mark VI; Mercury Grand Marquis; Ford LTD Crown Victoria

Powertrain
- Engine: 4.9 L (302 cu in) 5.0 L small block V8
- Transmission: 4-speed AOD automatic

Dimensions
- Wheelbase: 117.3 in (2,979 mm)
- Length: 219.2 in (5,568 mm)
- Width: 78.1 in (1,984 mm)
- Height: 55.9 in (1,420 mm)
- Curb weight: 2-door: 3,993 pounds (1,811 kg) 4-door: 4,006–4,120 pounds (1,817–1,869 kg)

A model year removed from the extensive downsizing of its full-size model range, Lincoln underwent a similar revision of its nameplates for 1981 as it renamed the Continental as the Lincoln Town Car. Following the retirement of the compact Versailles sedan during the 1980 model year, Lincoln was left marketing three nearly identical model lines (Continental, Continental Town Car, and Continental Mark VI). Along with introducing the Town Car, Lincoln introduced a redesigned Continental for 1982, moving it to the midsize segment alongside the Mark VII (introduced in 1984).

With the exception of nameplate badging, the Lincoln Town Car was identical to the 1980 Lincoln Continental. Alongside the four-door sedan, a two-door sedan was also offered for 1981 (dropping the Town Coupe name). Largely overshadowed by its Mark VI counterpart, the Town Car two-door was dropped for 1982; following the retirement of the Mark VI, full-size Lincolns were sold exclusively as four-door sedans.

At the time of its launch, the Town Car had been slated for replacement by front-wheel drive model lines (in anticipation of further volatility in fuel prices); as fuel prices began to stabilize, demand initially rose for the model line, leading Lincoln-Mercury to produce the Town Car through the 1980s with few visible changes. In 1982, the Town Car overtook the Mark VI to become the best-selling Lincoln model line (a title it would maintain until its discontinuation); after its 1985 revision, sales of the model line increased to over 100,000 vehicles per year (partly following the negative market response to the Cadillac downsizing of its Sedan deVille model line). For 1988, over 200,000 Town Cars were sold (the highest-ever for the brand); part of the record was established in Ford starting sales of the 1988 Town Car in March 1987 (making for an 18-month model year); conversely, in only six months, Lincoln managed to sell over 76,000 1987 Town Cars. Even after the launch of the eight-generation Continental for 1988 and the anticipation of the 1990 redesign, the 1989 model year became the second most successful for the Town Car.

=== Chassis ===
The 1980–1989 Lincoln Continental/Town Car used the Panther platform shared with Ford and Mercury. Delayed to the 1980 model year due to engineering issues, the Panther platform meant radically different exterior dimensions for the Lincoln models. Although extended three inches in wheelbase over its Ford/Mercury/Mark VI coupe counterparts, the 1980–1989 versions would have the shortest wheelbase ever used for a full-size Lincoln at the time (10 inches shorter than its 1979 predecessor). The 1980 Continental/Town Car was the shortest Lincoln since the Versailles. In the interest of fuel economy and handling, the Panther chassis reduced weight by up to 1,400 lb (635 kg) compared to the 1970–1979 full-size Lincolns. As the lightest full-size Lincoln in 40 years, the 1980 Continental/Town Car came within less than 200 pounds of the curb weight of the compact-sized Versailles. The new Panther platform meant reduced overall size, better suspension geometry, and upgraded power steering with a reduced turning diameter by over 8 feet (compared to the 1979 Lincoln Continental). For 1984, gas-pressurized shocks were added.

To achieve better Corporate Average Fuel Economy (CAFE) results, Ford discontinued the 400 and 460 big-block V8s in its full-size cars. For 1980, a 130 hp (97 kW; 132 PS) 4.9 L V8 (the 302 engine was marketed as a "5.0 L" V8) was standard. A 140 hp (104 kW; 142 PS) 351 cu in (5.8 L) V8 was available as an option. Following the introduction of the Lincoln Town Car in 1981, the 302 cu in (4.9 L) V8 became the only available engine (with the 351 becoming an option for Ford and Mercury). In Canada, the 302 V8 remained carbureted until 1985. In 1986, the 302 V8 was revised to 150 hp (112 kW; 152 PS), following a redesign of the fuel-injection system with the introduction of sequential multi-port fuel injection. These engines are identifiable by their cast aluminum upper intake manifolds with a horizontal throttle body (vertical throttle plate); this replaced the traditional throttle body with a carburetor-style top-mounted air cleaner previously used. Introduced in the Lincoln Continental for 1980 and marketed in all Panther-platform vehicles in 1981, the Lincoln Town Car was equipped with the 4-speed AOD automatic overdrive transmission, the sole transmission of 1981–1989 examples.

All Town Cars from 1980 through 1989 were available with an optional trailer towing package that included dual exhausts, a 3.55:1 limited-slip differential (code 'K') and an improved cooling package for the engine and transmission.

Engine	Displacement	Fuel System	Years produced	Horsepower rating	Torque output	Notes	Transmission
Ford 5.0 V8	4.9 liters (302 cu in)	CFI (USA; Canada 1985) 2bbl carburetor (Canada 1981–1984)	1981	130 hp (97 kW) at 3400 rpm	230 lb⋅ft (312 N⋅m) at 2,200 rpm		Ford 4-speed AOD automatic
Ford 5.0 V8	4.9 liters (302 cu in)	CFI (USA; Canada 1985) 2bbl carburetor (Canada 1981–1984)	1982	134 hp (100 kW) at 3400 rpm	245 lb⋅ft (332 N⋅m) at 2,200 rpm		Ford 4-speed AOD automatic
Ford 5.0 V8	4.9 liters (302 cu in)	CFI (USA; Canada 1985) 2bbl carburetor (Canada 1981–1984)	1983	140 hp (104 kW) at 3200 rpm	250 lb⋅ft (339 N⋅m). at 2,000 rpm		Ford 4-speed AOD automatic
Ford 5.0 V8	4.9 liters (302 cu in)	CFI (USA; Canada 1985) 2bbl carburetor (Canada 1981–1984)	1984–1985	140 hp (104 kW) at 3200 rpm	250 lb⋅ft (339 N⋅m) at 1,600 rpm		Ford 4-speed AOD automatic
Ford 5.0 V8	4.9 liters (302 cu in)	CFI (USA; Canada 1985) 2bbl carburetor (Canada 1981–1984)	1984–1985	155 hp (116 kW) at 3600 rpm	265 lb⋅ft (359 N⋅m). at 2,000 rpm	dual exhaust option	Ford 4-speed AOD automatic
Ford 5.0 V8	4.9 liters (302 cu in)	SEFI	1986–1989	150 hp (112 kW)	270 lb⋅ft (366 N⋅m) at 2,000 rpm		Ford 4-speed AOD automatic
Ford 5.0 V8	4.9 liters (302 cu in)	SEFI	1986–1989	160 hp (119 kW)	280 lb⋅ft (380 N⋅m) at 2,200 rpm	dual exhaust option	Ford 4-speed AOD automatic

=== Body ===
==== Exterior ====
During the late 1970s, the sales of the Lincoln Continental had held steady and the Continental Mark V would go on to outsell its Cadillac Eldorado counterpart. In the development of the Lincoln Town Car, the design themes of the 1977–1979 Lincoln Continental and Mark V would both influence the exterior design of the 1980 Continental/Town Car. As with its predecessors, the Town Car featured nearly flat body sides, sharp-edged fenders, and a radiator-style grille. Hideaway headlamps gave way to exposed halogen headlamps (the first on a full-size Lincoln since 1969). Another first included fully framed door glass (retractable vent windows were now standard); in contrast to its Ford and Mercury counterparts, the window frames were painted matte black. While chrome trim remained around the headlamps and window frames, in a break from Lincoln tradition, it was deleted from the top of the fenders. Though mechanically similar to the Ford LTD and Mercury Marquis (the Ford LTD Crown Victoria and Mercury Grand Marquis after 1983), the Lincoln Town Car shared visible body panels only with the Continental Mark VI. In contrast to its Ford, Mercury, and Mark VI counterparts, the rooflines of 1981–1989 Town Cars feature a vertical quarter window in the C-pillar.

After only 4,935 two-door Town Cars were sold in 1981, the body style was discontinued for 1982. In the shift from rebadging the Continental to the Lincoln Town Car for 1981, Lincoln replaced the "Continental" badging above the headlights with "Town Car."

A padded roof was standard equipment on all Town Cars, with its design determined by trim level. On standard-trim Town Cars, a leather-grained vinyl full-length covering with center pillar coach lamps was fitted. For Signature Series and Cartier trims, a padded vinyl landau top (covering only the rear half of the roof) with a frenched (smaller) rear window opening was fitted; the landau top was also an option on standard-trim Town Cars. On non-Cartier Town Cars, a full-length cloth (canvas) cabriolet roof was an option; imitating the look of a convertible, the design deleted the C-pillar quarter windows.

During the 1980s, the Lincoln Town Car would undergo several exterior revisions. For 1985, the model was given a mid-cycle facelift. In addition to (slightly) improving its aerodynamics, the design was intended to visually shorten the car (though the length was essentially unchanged). The front and rear bumpers were redesigned, better integrating them into the bodywork. The rear fascia was redesigned; distinguished by redesigned taillamps, and the trunk lid was better integrated with the rear fenders. For 1986, to meet federal regulations, a center brake light was added in the rear window. For 1988, the grille was updated with a brushed-metal panel between the taillamps, which now featured the reverse lamps.

1989 models are distinguished by special trim features including satin black paint for grille blades, trim between headlights, and amber (instead of clear) front parking lamps. The "Lincoln" front-end badging is moved from above the left headlight onto the grille and changed to a large sans-serif script. In the rear, the brushed-metal panel was given a pinstripe finish and all badging was moved from the panel onto the trunk lid. All models feature a landau roof with a smaller, more formal "frenched" rear window. All non-Cartier models also include an embedded Lincoln "star" emblems in their opera windows

==== Interior ====
The interior of the Lincoln Town Car featured many advanced luxury options for its time. Signature Series and Cartier models featured 6-way power seats (and manual seatback recliners) for the driver and front passenger; the Lincoln Town Car adopted a split front bench seat previously seen on the Mark coupes. Several electronic features included an optional digital display trip computer showing the driver "miles to empty" and (based on driver input) an "estimated time of arrival". Ford's proprietary door-mounted keypad system, marketed as its Securicode, unlocked the vehicle through a 5-digit combination (factory-programmed or owner-programmed). Mounted above the driver's door handle, the keypad allowed the driver to lock all four doors; after entering the code, the driver could unlock the doors or release the trunk lid. Along with keyfob-based systems, the keypad system is still in use on Ford and Lincoln vehicles (as of 2025).

As part of the 1985 update, the Lincoln Town Car was the first Ford vehicle to feature a CD player as an option (as part of a 12-speaker JBL premium stereo system); while 1984 was the final year for the option of 8-track players and CB radios for the Town Car. In a functional change, the horn button was moved from the turn-signal lever to the steering wheel hub. The door trim was changed from wood to upholstery matching the seats.

For 1986, the front-seat head restraints were replaced with a taller 4-way articulating design; walnut burl trim replaced much of the satin black trim on the lower dash. For 1988, the instrument cluster was updated; for Town Cars with analog gauges, the instrument panel was given round dials in square bezels. In addition, new wood trim was added to the dashboard and steering wheel.

1981–1989 Lincoln Town Car

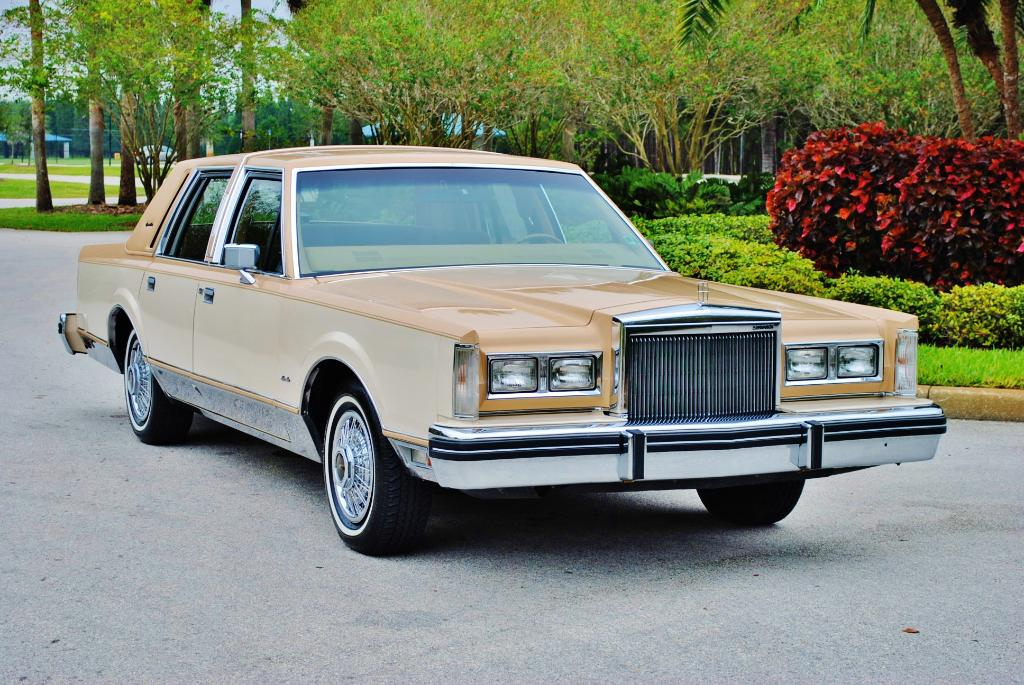
1984 Lincoln Town Car Signature Series

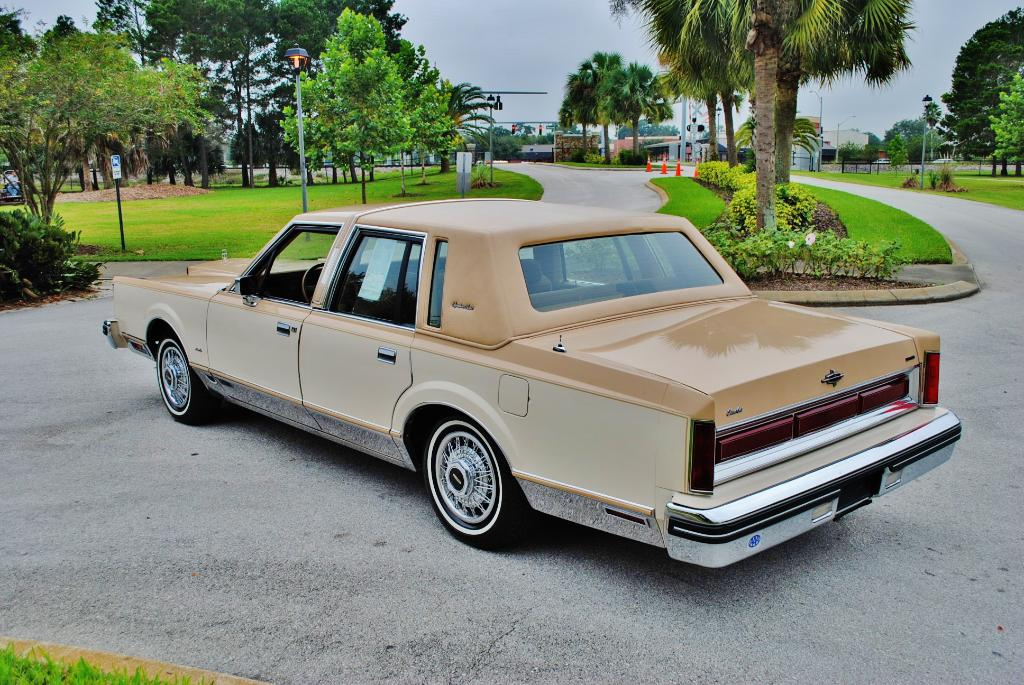
1984 Lincoln Town Car Signature Series, rear

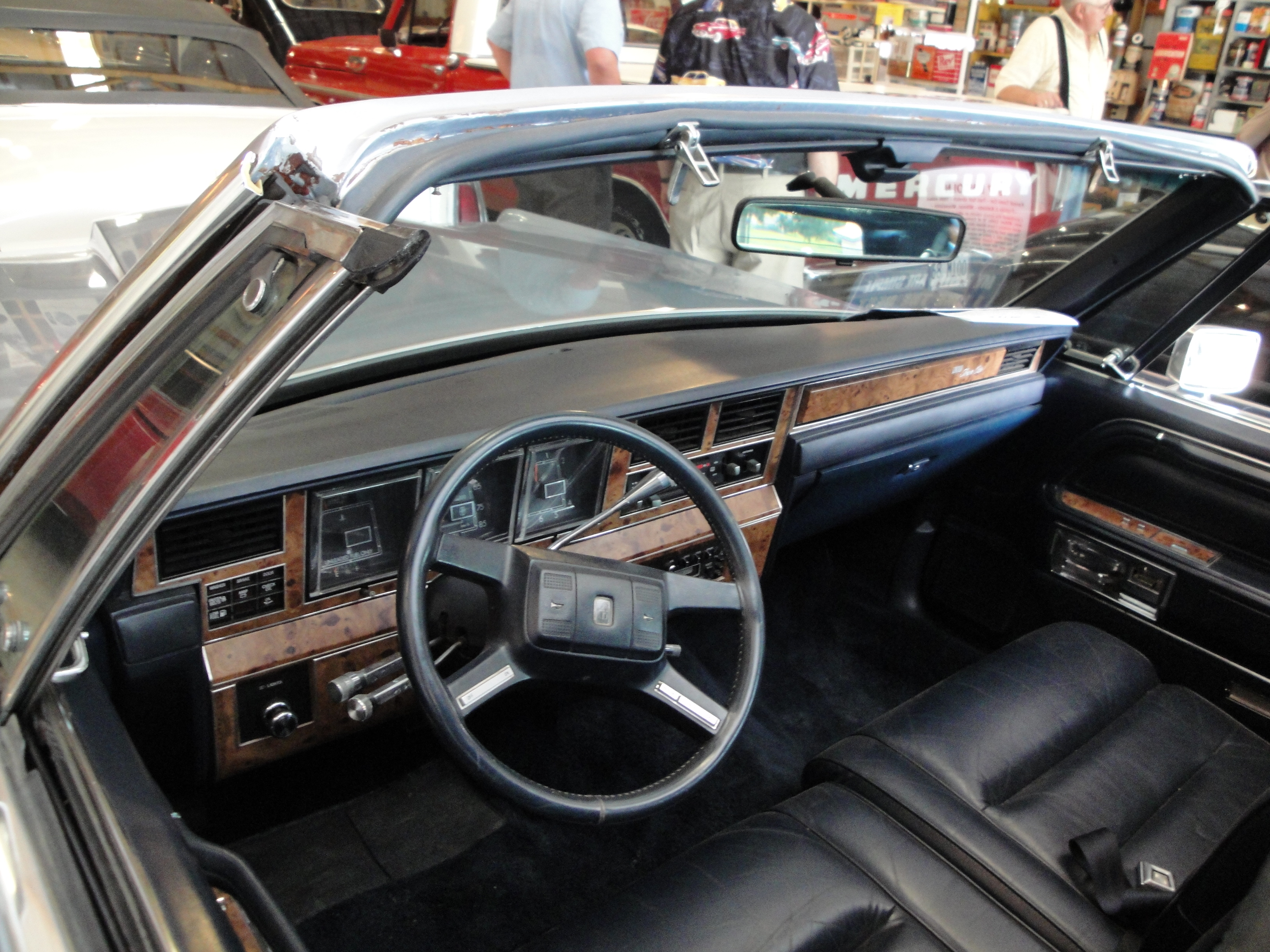
1987 Lincoln Town Car dashboard (open-roof limousine conversion)

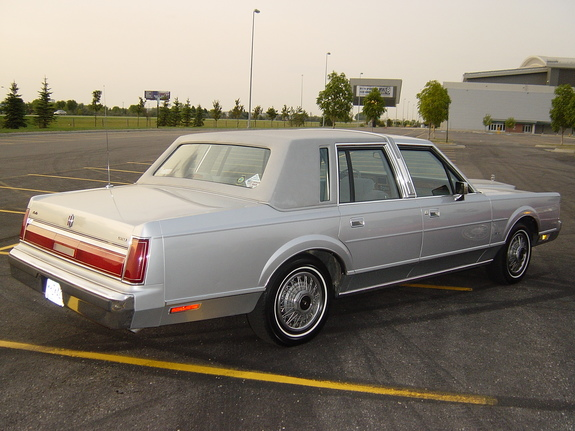
1986 Lincoln Town Car rear view

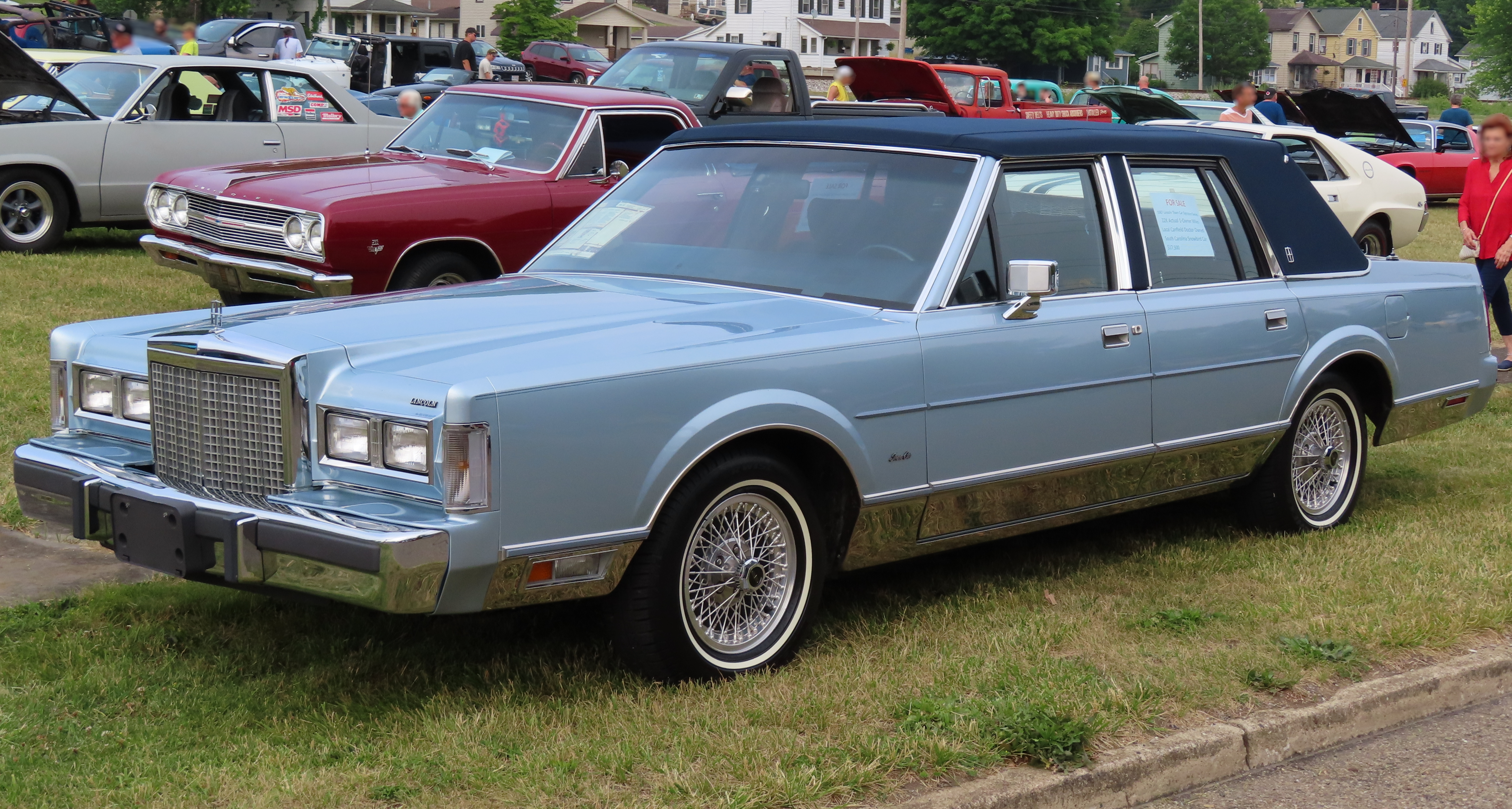
1987 Lincoln Town Car Signature Series

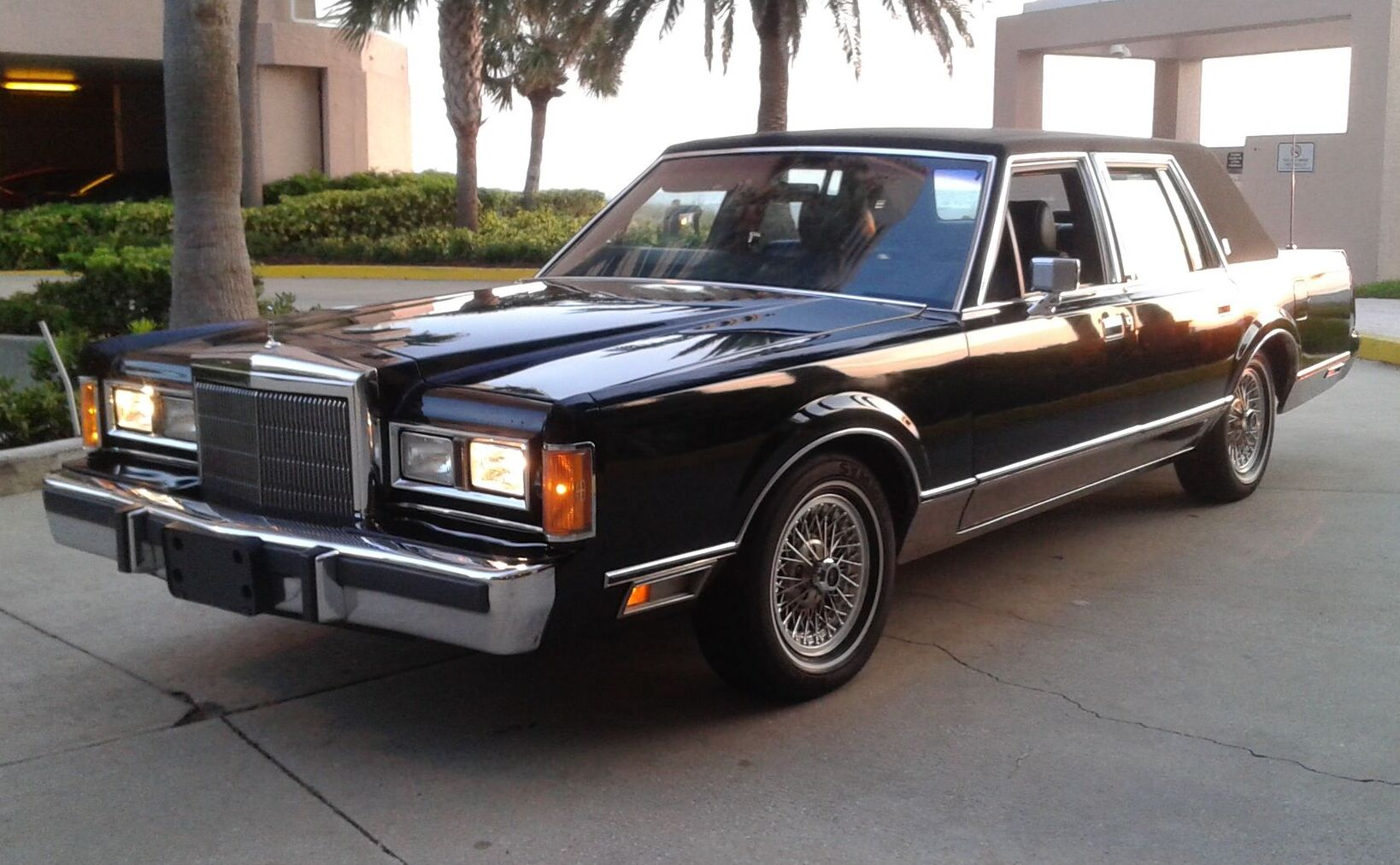
1989 Lincoln Town Car

=== Trim ===
At its 1980 launch, the Lincoln Town Car was offered in two trim levels, a standard/base trim and a Lincoln Town Car Signature Series (a name shared with the Mark VI, though with less exclusive features). In 1982, Lincoln adopted the Mark-Series tradition of Designer Series editions as the Cartier Edition was shifted from the Mark VI to the Town Car, becoming the top trim level; the Cartier Edition would remain part of the Town Car line through the 2003 model year.

==== Special editions ====
Cartier Designer Edition

In 1982, in a trim level shift, the Cartier Edition was moved from the Mark Series to the Lincoln Town Car. As before, the special-edition package consisted of exclusively coordinated exterior colors and interior designs, with the Cartier logo embroidered in place of the Lincoln "star" emblem on the seats. For 1987, the package underwent a redesign with a new upholstery design and new two-tone (metallic beige) platinum added alongside the traditional platinum silver and two-tone arctic white.

Sail America Commemorative Edition
This special edition 1987 Signature Series model came in white with a blue carriage roof and had a white leather interior with blue piping and special badging. Ford Motor Company was one of the corporate sponsors of the "Sail America Foundation" syndicate, and owner of the 1987 America's Cup winning yacht Stars & Stripes 87.

Special Edition
The 1988 Town Car Signature Series was available with a $2,461 (~$5,771 in 2025) 'Special Edition package', which included a carriage roof (giving the appearance of a convertible top), wire-spoke aluminum wheels, JBL audio system, leather-wrapped steering wheel, and leather upholstery with contrasting-color piping. This replaced a proposed Gucci edition Town Car that had been in the works.

Gucci Edition
1989 Signature Series Gucci Edition had a special blue canvas roof with fluorescent B-pillar light and a special blue badge on the C-pillar with the word signature. It was designated in the VIN as code 84.

=== Marketing ===
For the 1985 model year, the Cadillac DeVille and Fleetwood, traditional competitors of the Lincoln Town Car, shifted to front-wheel drive platforms (although, the Fleetwood Brougham retained its rear-drive platform and styling). At the time, Lincoln marketed the larger size of the Town Car as a selling point. In response to the downsized Cadillacs, Lincoln introduced a series of advertisements in late 1985 titled "The Valet" which depicted parking attendants having trouble distinguishing Cadillacs from lesser Buicks (Electras) and Oldsmobiles (Ninety-Eights), with the question "Is that a Cadillac?" answered by the response "No, it's an Oldsmobile...or Buick." At the end, the owner of a Lincoln would appear with the line "The Lincoln Town Car, please." The commercial campaign saw the emergence of a new advertising slogan for the brand, "Lincoln. What a Luxury Car Should Be." which was used into the 1990s. The marketing campaign was unable to turn around declining Town Car sales. It was only after an all-new redesigned Town Car was introduced in 1989 for the 1990 model year that sales temporarily rebounded.

=== Production ===
Lincoln Town Car Production Figures
	Coupe	Sedan	Yearly Total
1981	4,935	27,904	32,839
1982	-	35,069	35,069
1983	-	53,381	53,381
1984	-	93,622	93,622
1985	-	119,878	119,878
1986	-	117,771	117,771
1987	-	76,483	76,483
1988	-	201,113	201,113
1989	-	123,669	123,669
Total	4,935	848,890	853,825

== Second generation (FN36/116; 1990–1997) ==
Second generation (FN36/116)
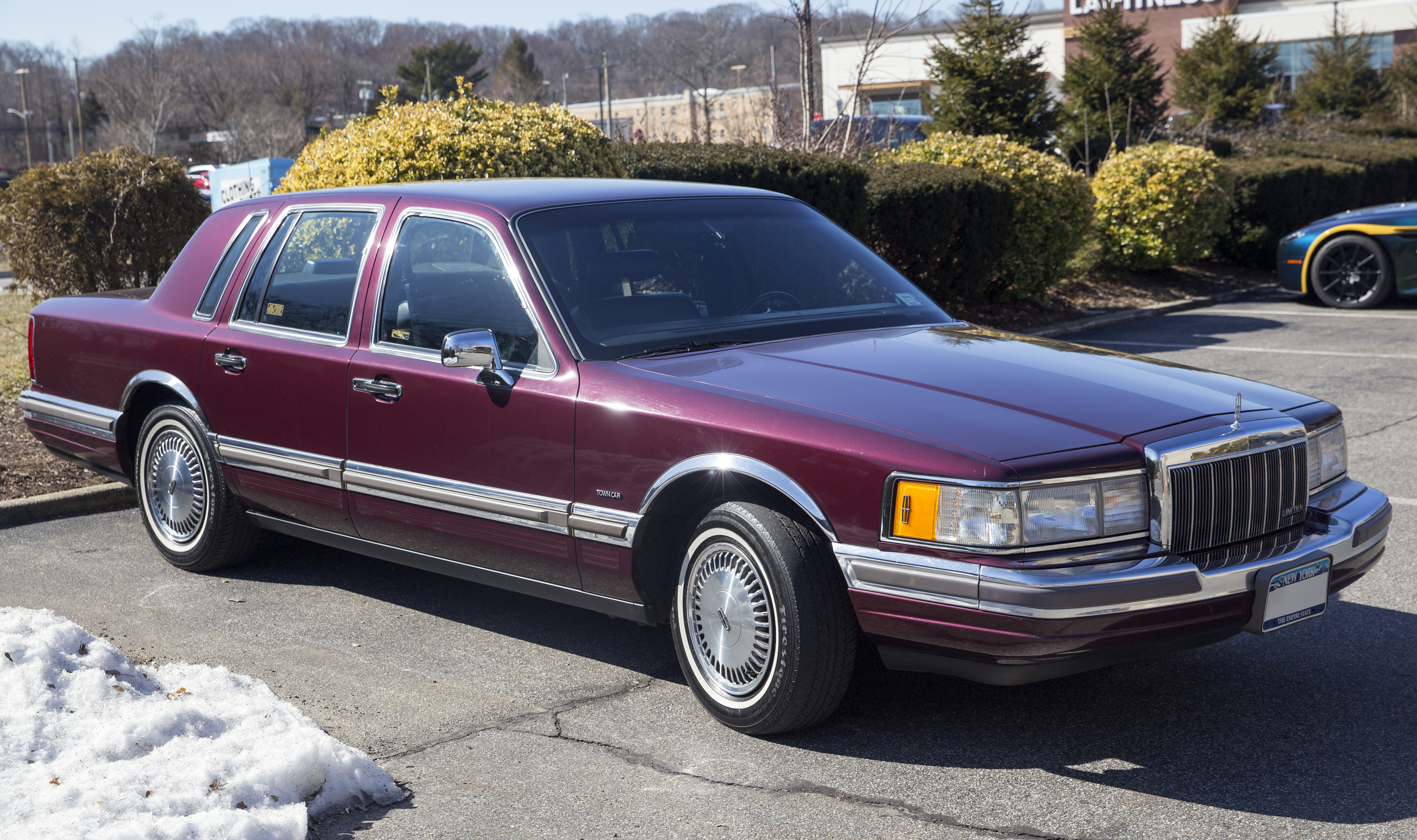
- 1990 Lincoln Town Car (base)

Overview
- Also called: Hongqi CA7465 (China)
- Production: July 1989 – September 20, 1997
- Model years: 1990–1997
- Assembly: United States: Wixom, Michigan (Wixom Assembly); China: Changchun (1995–1997)
- Designer: Gale Halderman (1986)

Body and chassis
- Body style: 4-door sedan
- Related: Mercury Grand Marquis; Ford Crown Victoria

Powertrain
- Engine: 1990: 4.9 L (302 cu in) 5.0 L small block V8; 1991–1997: 4.6 L (281 cu in) Modular SOHC V8
- Transmission: 4-speed AOD automatic (1990–1992); 4-speed AOD-E automatic (1992–1994); 4-speed 4R70W automatic (1995–1997)

Dimensions
- Wheelbase: 117.4 in (2,982 mm)
- Length: 1990–1994: 218.9 in (5,560 mm); 1995–1997: 219.0 in (5,563 mm)
- Width: 1990–1991: 78.1 in (1,984 mm); 1992–1994: 76.9 in (1,953 mm); 1995–97: 76.7 in (1,948 mm)
- Height: 1990–94: 56.7 in (1,440 mm); 1995–1997: 56 in (1,422 mm)
- Curb weight: 3,935–4,103 pounds (1,785–1,861 kg)

After ten years on the market (nine of them as the Town Car) relatively unchanged, the Lincoln Town Car was given an extensive redesign inside and out, being launched on October 5, 1989, as a 1990 model. In a move to bring a new generation of buyers to the Lincoln brand, the Town Car adopted a far more contemporary image, bringing it in line with the Continental and Mark VII. In addition, the Town Car adopted a new range of safety and luxury features and would mark the debut of a powertrain that would see usage in a wide variety of Ford Motor Company vehicles. The Town Car was named the 1990 Motor Trend Car of the Year.

The Town Car's redesign gave the model a significant sales boost in 1990, helping Lincoln achieve record total sales that year. The second-generation Town Car became one of the best-selling full-size U.S. luxury sedans. Town Car sales quickly declined again and would drop below 100,000 in 1995 for the first time in over ten years. This decline mirrored what had been going on in the luxury car market as buyers’ tastes shifted more towards nimbler, performance-oriented models, and eventually SUVs.

Following the discontinuation of the Cadillac Fleetwood by General Motors after 1996, the Lincoln Town Car became the longest-length regular-production sedan sold in the United States.

=== Development ===
The second-generation Town Car was developed from 1985 until 1989 under the codename FN36, at a cost of US$650 million, led by project manager John Jay. Following its downsizing to the Panther platform in 1980, the Lincoln Town Car was originally slated to be discontinued by the middle of the decade and replaced by a smaller front-wheel drive sedan; after the 1979 fuel crisis, gasoline prices were predicted to reach $2.50 per gallon and Ford Motor Company had lost $1.5 billion for 1980. However, by 1984, full-size Lincoln sales had rapidly increased, with 1984 sales up 300% over 1980. Instead of ending the product cycle of the Lincoln Town Car, Ford product planners instead chose its front-wheel drive mid-size platform (of the Ford Taurus) to become the next-generation Lincoln Continental.

In August 1985, Ford designers began sketching and constructing clay models of competing designs under lead designer Gale Halderman and Ford Group Design Vice President Jack Telnack, with a final design chosen in May 1986; two full-scale (1:1) proposals were reviewed by a four-member design committee, chaired by CEO Donald Petersen, Jack Telnack, Ford President Harold Poling, and William Clay Ford, vice-chairman. Various proposals were considered ranging from a conservative update of the existing Town Car to a European-style body in the design language of the 1988 Lincoln Continental (FN-9, designed in 1984).

The final compromise of the committee sought to keep the identity of the Town Car while introducing a contemporary vehicle for the 1990s. In the interest of fuel economy, the Lincoln Town Car was required to become more aerodynamic (reducing wind noise), but key parts of its design were integrated into its design, with its radiator-style grille, chrome trim, and opera windows. In a major design constraint, the design team was not to make any major reductions in size to the Town Car, preserving its large interior and trunk space as key marketing points to buyers.

In 1984, a second factor driving the design of the FN36 project was initiated, as the United States government introduced regulations mandating passive restraints on vehicles produced after September 1, 1989; along with automatic seat belts, out of necessity, automakers began to reconsider the use of airbags as passive restraints. By 1988, dual airbags remained nearly unused in cars sold in the United States, with the exception of the Mercedes S-Class (Mercedes-Benz W126) and the Porsche 944. To comply with the legislation, Lincoln introduced the 1988 Continental with dual airbags, becoming the first Ford Motor Company (and first domestically produced vehicle) with them standard. As adding airbags to the 1988–1989 Town Car would require a redesign of the steering column and entire dashboard, dual airbag were moved to the FN36 project, making them an intended standard feature.

In March 1986, the design freeze for the project occurred, with an intended production start of mid-1989. The second-generation Lincoln Town Car would become the first domestic Ford vehicle engineered outside of the company and constructed by foreign suppliers, with International Automotive Design of Worthing, West Sussex, England handling the engineering, while Japan-based Ogihara Iron Works supplying all of the Town Car body panels from its own factory near the Wixom plant. To improve quality of prototypes, project managers broke from automotive industry precedent, requiring successive hand-built prototypes to be built to production-level quality to determine the locations and causes of specific issues of tooling and manufacturing. From 1988 until 1989, the Town Car would go from over a year behind its production date to two weeks ahead of schedule.

=== Chassis ===
To lower the development and production costs of the extensive redesign, Ford Motor Company retained the Panther platform for the Lincoln Town Car, continuing its use of rear-wheel drive. In a major change, rear air suspension (introduced as an option for all three Panther vehicles in 1988) became standard equipment on all Town Cars. For 1990, the Town Car was produced with 11-inch rear drum brakes (identical to its 1989 predecessor); for 1991, they were replaced by 10-inch solid rotor disc brakes.

Due to development delays in the Modular engine program, the 1990 Lincoln Town Car was released with the same powertrain as its predecessor: the 150 hp (112 kW; 152 PS) 302 cu in (4.9 L) small block V8 engine with a 4-speed AOD overdrive automatic. In October 1990, the 302 (marketed as 5.0 L) V8 was replaced by a 190 hp (142 kW; 193 PS) 4.6 L SOHC Modular V8 for 1991 models; for the 1994 model year, the optional 210 hp dual-exhaust version of the engine became standard. Shared with the Ford Crown Victoria and Mercury Grand Marquis, the SOHC version of the 4.6 L Modular V8 would see use in a number of other Ford vehicles within the Ford light-truck line, remaining in production into 2014. For 1993, the AOD transmission was converted to electronic operation, becoming the AOD-E. In 1994, along with a mid-cycle refresh, the 1995 Town Car received the higher-torque 4R70W from the Lincoln Mark VIII.

Engine	Displacement	Years Produced	Horsepower rating	Torque output	Notes	Transmission
Ford 5.0 small block V8	4.9 liters (302 cu in)	1990	150 hp (112 kW)	270 lb⋅ft (366 N⋅m) at 2,000 rpm	Single exhaust configuration, sold with base trim level	4-speed overdrive automatic 1990–1992: Ford AOD 1993–1994: Ford AOD-E 1995–1997: Ford 4R70W
Ford 5.0 small block V8	4.9 liters (302 cu in)	1990	160 hp (119 kW)	280 lb⋅ft (380 N⋅m) at 2,200 rpm	Dual exhaust configuration, sold with Signature Series and Cartier	4-speed overdrive automatic 1990–1992: Ford AOD 1993–1994: Ford AOD-E 1995–1997: Ford 4R70W
Ford Modular SOHC V8	4.6 liters (281 cu in)	1991–1997	210 hp (157 kW)	275 lb⋅ft (373 N⋅m) at 3,250 rpm	Dual exhaust configuration, sold with Executive Series, Signature Series, and Cartier	4-speed overdrive automatic 1990–1992: Ford AOD 1993–1994: Ford AOD-E 1995–1997: Ford 4R70W
Ford Modular SOHC V8	4.6 liters (281 cu in)	1997	190 hp (142 kW)	265 lb⋅ft (359 N⋅m) at 3,250 rpm	Single exhaust configuration, sold with Executive Series and select signature series only in 1997	4-speed overdrive automatic 1990–1992: Ford AOD 1993–1994: Ford AOD-E 1995–1997: Ford 4R70W

=== Body ===
The second-generation Lincoln Town Car was designed by Gale Halderman and Ford Group Design Vice President Jack Telnack.

==== Exterior ====
In its redesign for the 1990 model year, Lincoln stylists sought a completely new design for the Town Car. Many traditional Lincoln styling cues were heavily reworked or abandoned completely. Although the Town Car would keep its formal notchback sedan roofline, the flat-sided fenders and angular lines seen since the Continentals and Mark IIIs of the late 1960s disappeared. Stylists made the body more aerodynamic reducing the drag coefficient from 0.46 to 0.36 (matching the 1988 Continental and besting the Mark VII). The 1990 Town Car still retained several styling influences, including its vertical taillights, radiator-style grille, hood ornament, alloy wheels, and vertical C-pillar window. In a move to market the Town Car to buyers of contemporary vehicles, several other changes were made. Although two-tone paint remained available (featuring a lower body accent color in gray metallic), monotone paint schemes would become increasingly standard. In a major change, a vinyl roof was no longer offered, since vinyl roofs declined in popularity among many buyers. Spoked aluminum wheels were dropped from the options list for 1990, while locking wire wheel discs remained through 1992.

In late 1992, the exterior was given a minor update with a new grille and slightly redesigned tail lamp lenses (distinguished by a "checkerboard" pattern) for 1993 models. As with the Crown Victoria and Grand Marquis, the Town Car received a larger update for the 1995 model year in late 1994 as the FN116. This facelift is distinguished by the deletion of the fixed quarter glass in the rear doors along with the redesign of the side mirrors (enlarged and changed to body-color). Although the bumper largely remained unchanged, the front fascia was updated as the headlamp clusters are changed to a clear-lens design and separated from the grille. The grille was redesigned, returning to the 1990–1992 design in a surround fitting closer to the body. The rear fascia saw the trim between the tail lamps redesigned, featuring additional running lights, while the reverse lamps were moved from the outer edges of the reflector panel to the center, beneath the lid lock cover (similar to the 1985–1987 models).

==== Interior ====
In a departure from the Lincoln Continental and Mark VII, the use of the Panther platform necessitated a degree of component sharing with the Ford and Mercury counterparts. Although fitted with its own seats and door panels, the Town Car was fitted with essentially the same dashboard as the Mercury Grand Marquis (versions with digital instruments retained the instrument panel layout from 1988 until 1989). In 1993, the wood trim was changed to an orange-toned walnut. Due to its popularity (and to better separate the Town Car from its Ford/Mercury counterparts), the digital instrument panel was made standard; as such, the climate-control system was converted to a digital display. New for the 1995 model year was an integrated, voice-activated in-car cellular telephone concealed in the center armrest, which featured a speakerphone as well as a rearview mirror-mounted microphone for hands-free calling.

As part of its 1995 Mid-cycle refresh, the interior saw a greater degree of change than the exterior. To bring the design up to date (and in line with the rest of the Lincoln line), the dashboard and door panels featured a curved design, while influenced by the Mark VIII, the 6-passenger design of the Town Car precluded the adoption of a center console in the interior. To increase storage space, the dual center armrests of the front seats on Signature and Cartier models were redesigned to include storage compartments (to hold cassettes and the optional cellular telephone). The dashboard design continued into the new door panels, now with an illuminated power window and seat adjuster cluster, and a back-lit power door lock switch placed higher on the door. Releases for the trunk and fuel door were moved from the dashboard onto the lower driver's door. Redesigned seat patterns now offered an available driver and front passenger electric heat feature. The radio antenna was integrated into the rear window. Although the basic controls of the interior remained common across all Panther vehicles, the Town Car gained a model-specific instrument panel, featuring italicized readouts.

For 1996, the climate controls were again redesigned; while Cartier Designer Editions featured genuine wood trim on the dashboard and door panels. In 1997, a few changes were made, the rear center armrest added a pair of cup holders, while Cartier models gained rear-seat vanity mirrors mounted in the headliner. Also in 1997, the trim level badges were moved to the front fenders in place of the "Town Car" badges. Subsequently, the rear side opera windows no longer featured their trim-level engravings.

1990–1997 Lincoln Town Car

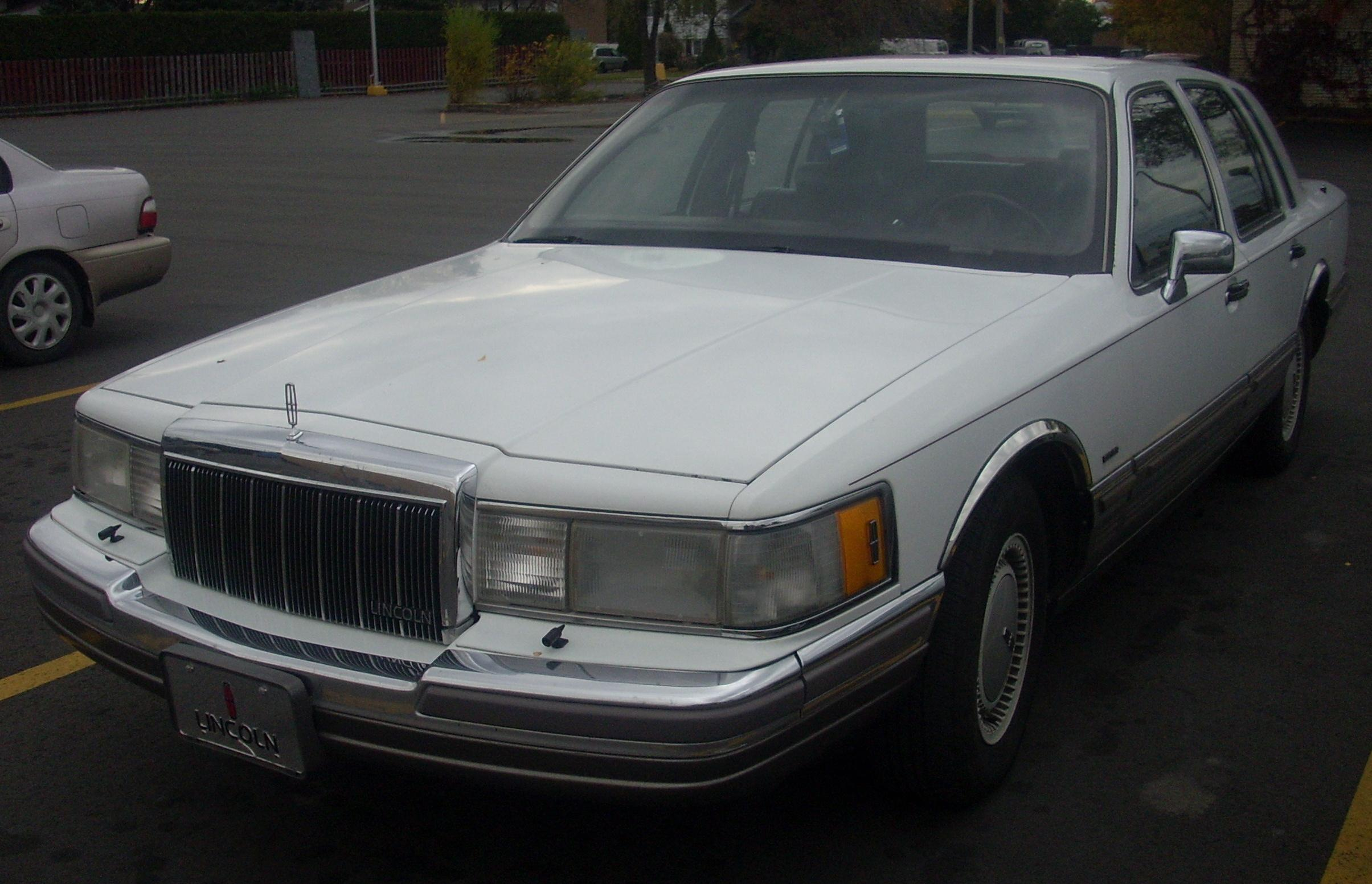
1990 Lincoln Town Car Executive Series

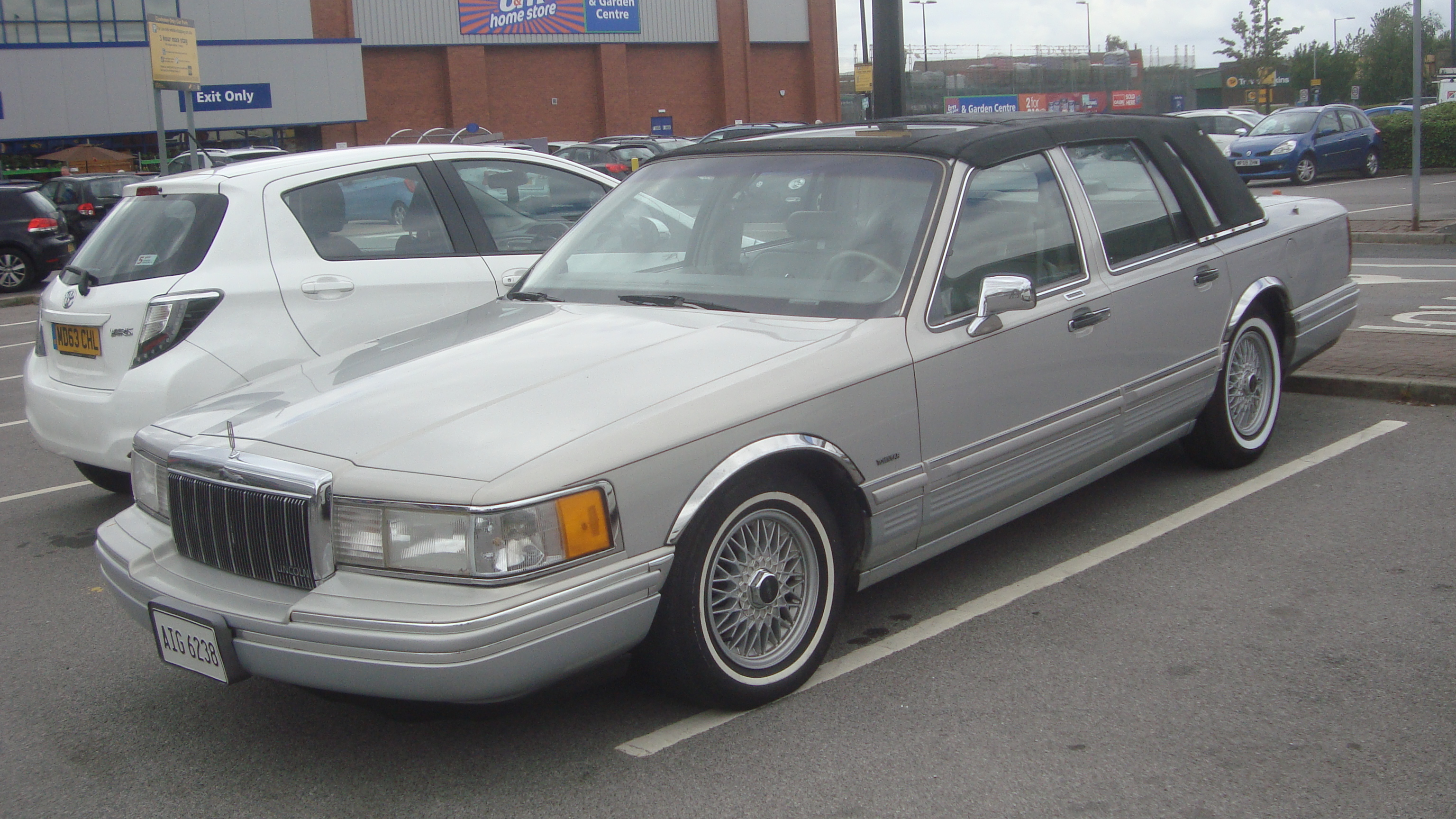
1991 Lincoln Town Car Signature Series

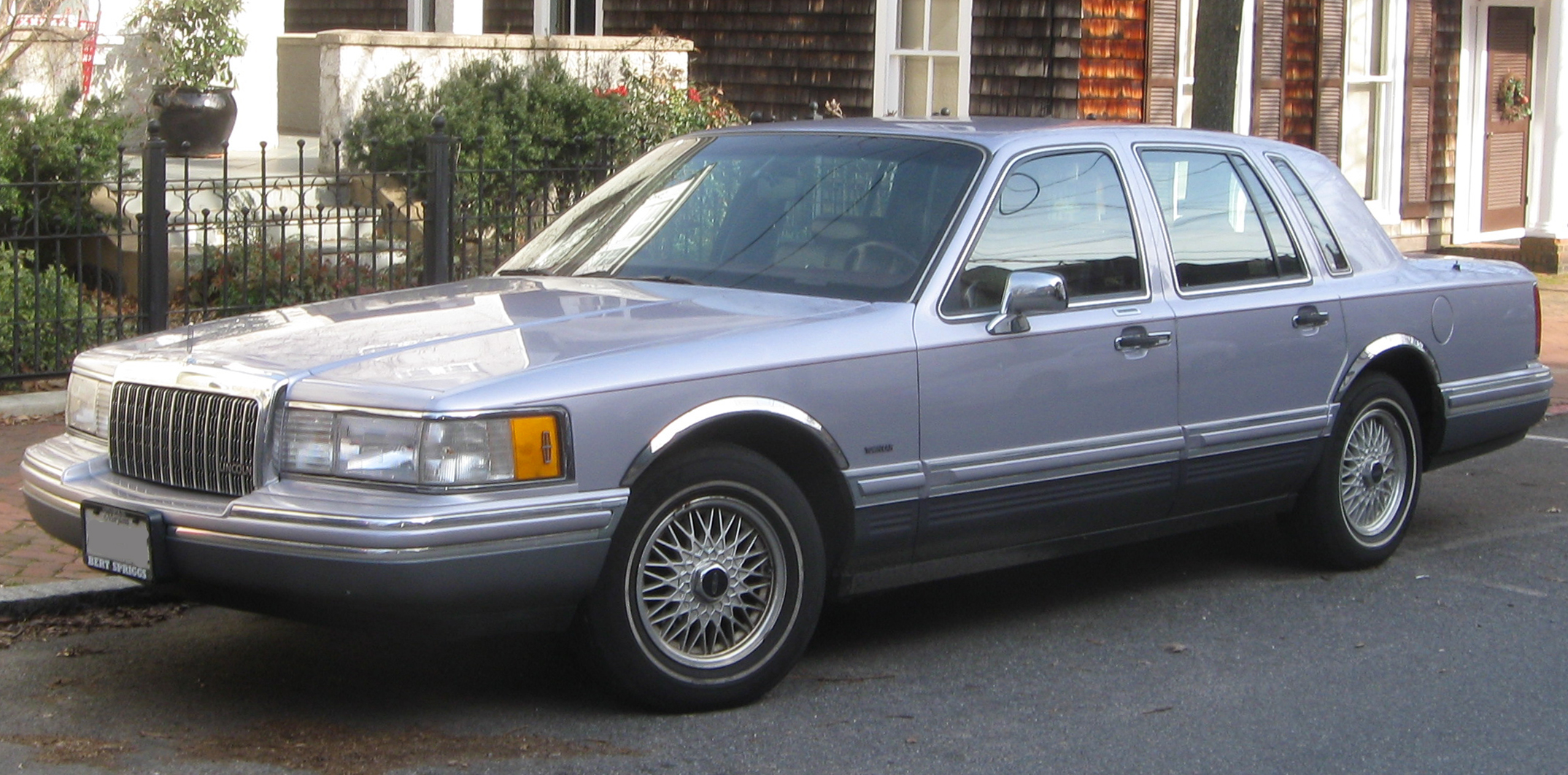
1993–1994 Lincoln Town Car Signature Series

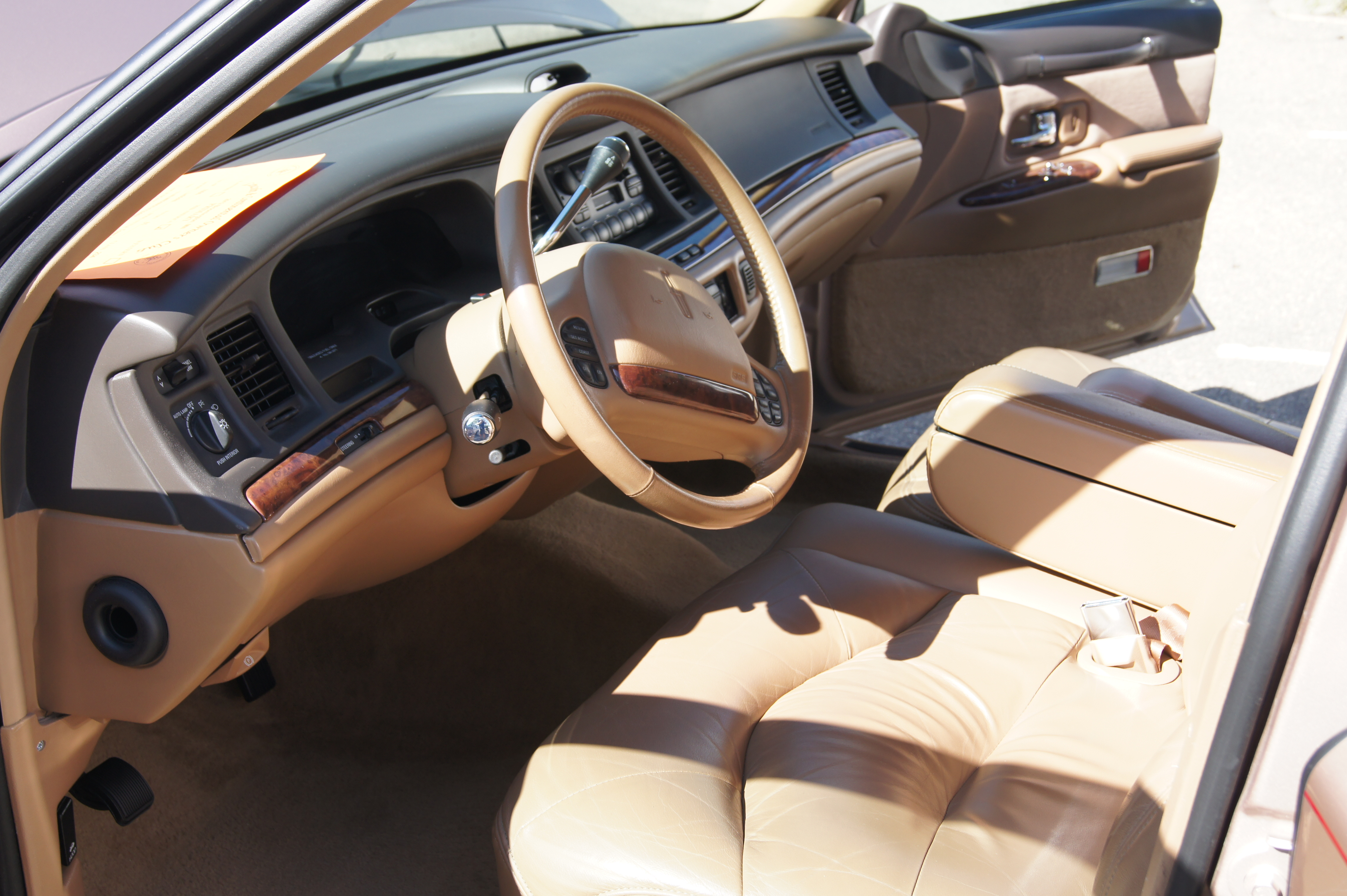
Driver seat, dashboard; 1996 Lincoln Town Car

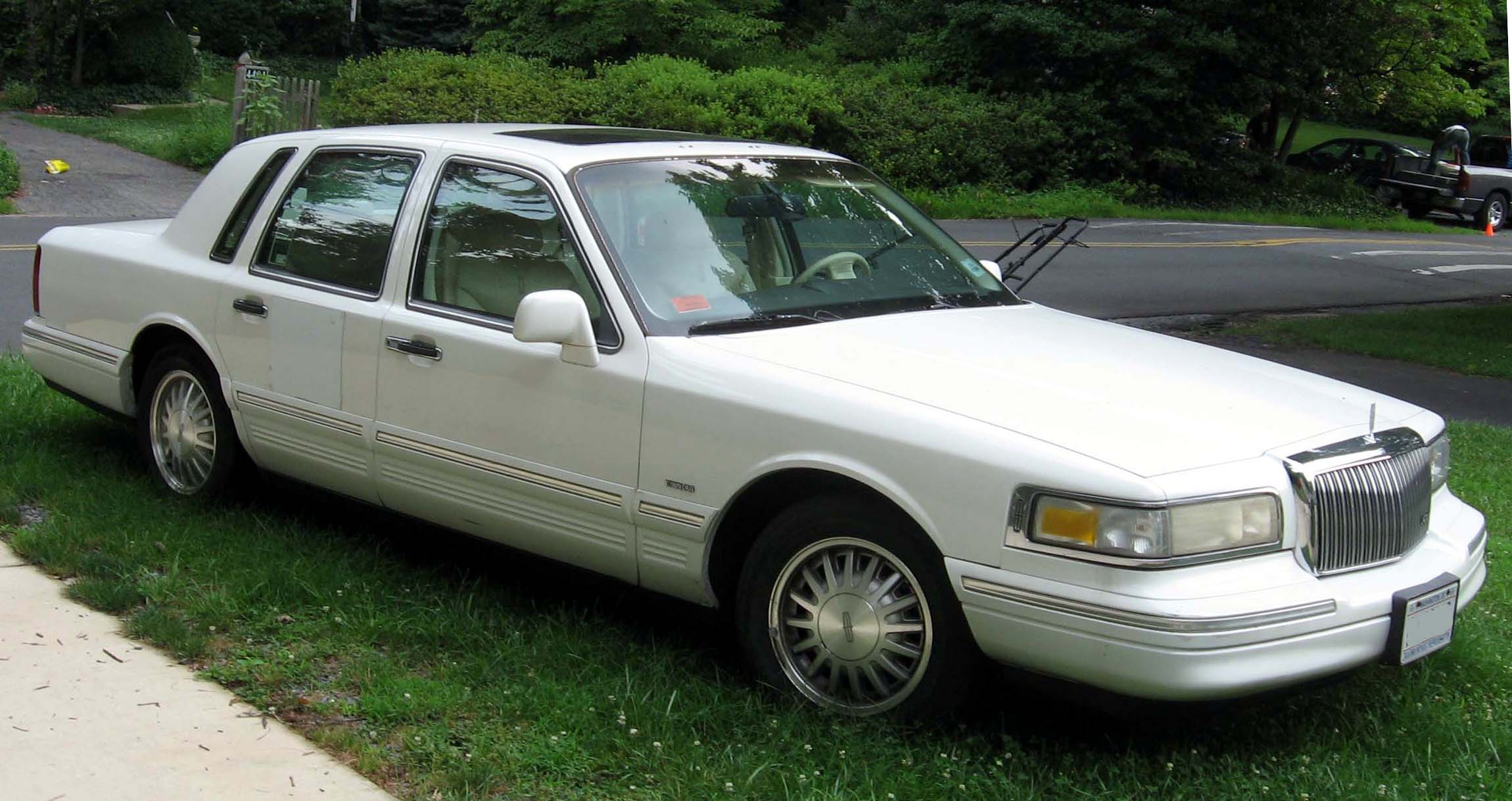
1995–1997 Lincoln Town Car Cartier Edition

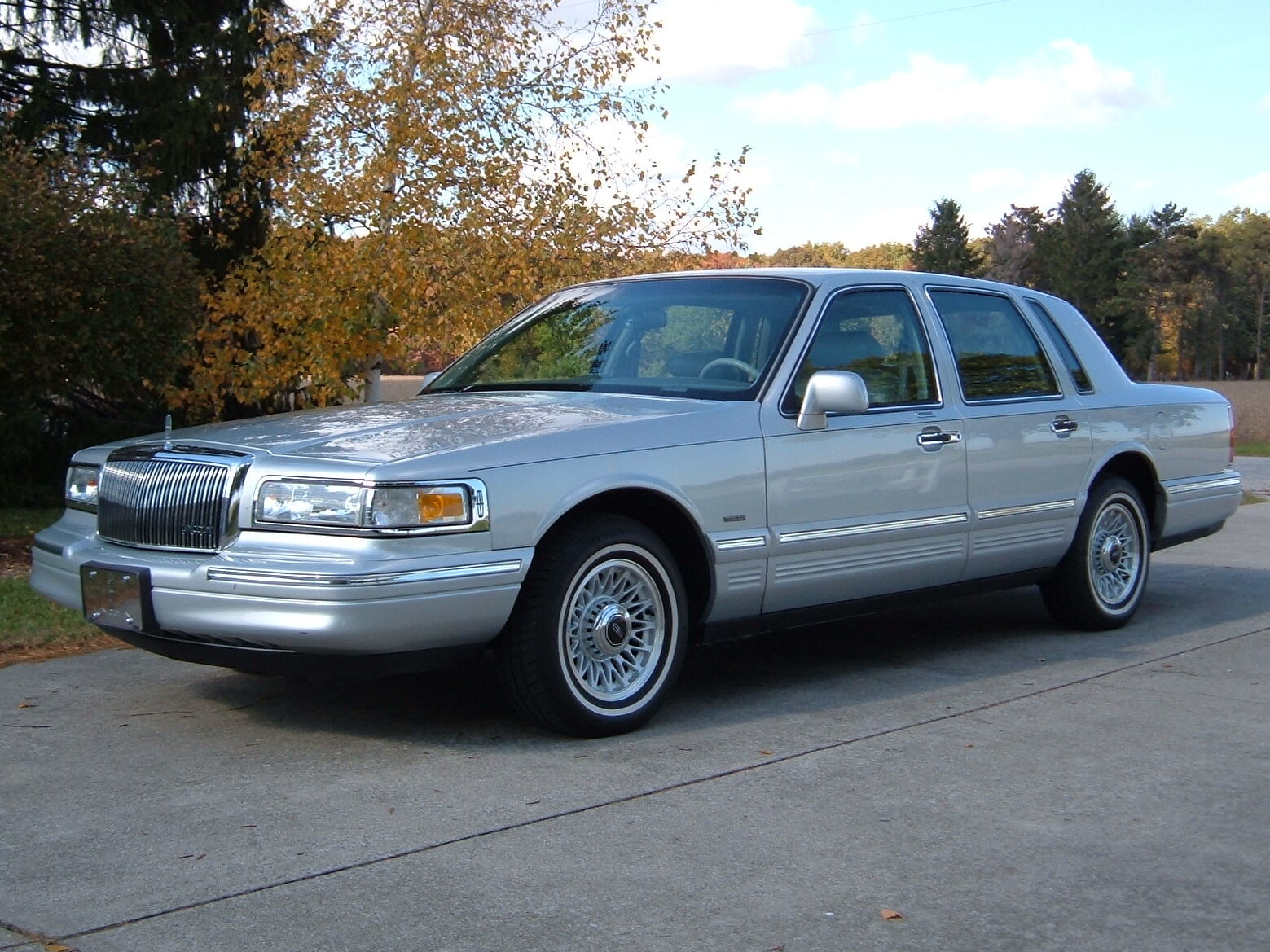
1996 Lincoln Town Car

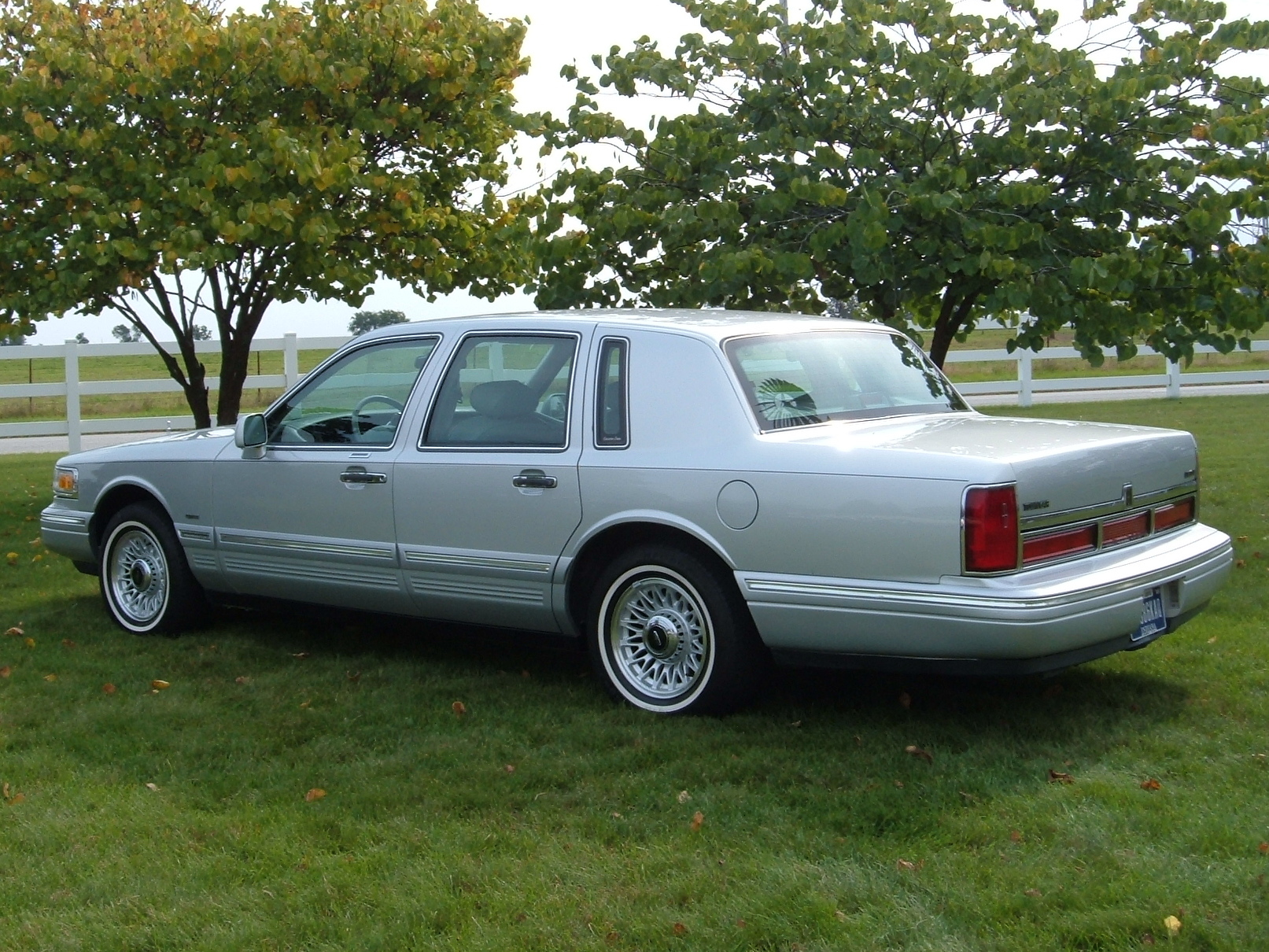
1996 Lincoln Town Car rear

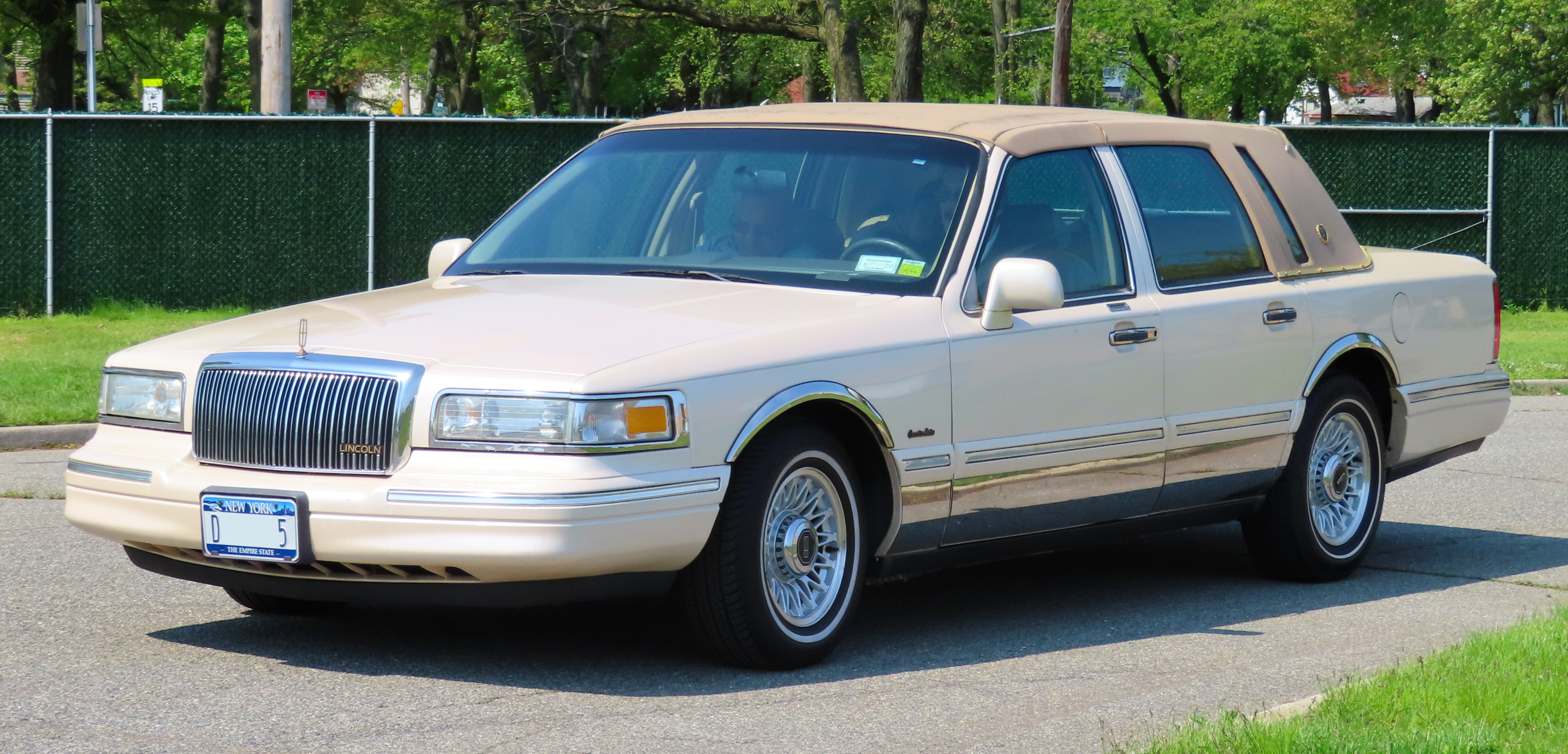
1997 Lincoln Town Car Executive Series

=== Trim ===
Upon its redesign in October 1989, the Lincoln Town Car carried over its three previous trim levels: base, Signature Series, and Cartier Designer Edition. For 1991, the base trim was renamed Executive Series. From 1989 through 1996, the Lincoln Town Car was available with a factory towing package.

The Base (Executive Series from 1991MY onward) Town Car offered six-passenger seating with two bench seats, a four-speaker AM/FM stereo with cassette player, 6-way front power seats, a four-speed automatic overdrive transmission, cloth seating surfaces, fifteen-inch tires, dashboard clock, and Ford's proprietary keypad entry system, marketed as "SecuriCode".

The Signature Series added a digital vacuum fluorescent instrument cluster, trip computer, and standard alloy wheels. The Cartier Edition was fitted with the same features as the Signature Series, adding a JBL-branded sound system with an amplifier, a security system, alloy spoked wheels, and other details, such as cloth and leather seats. In a departure from tradition, starting in 1990, Cartier Designer Edition Town Cars were no longer available in a single color combination yearly, but in several different interior/exterior combinations. In addition, aside from gray lower body trim offered as an option for Signature Series Town Cars, Cartier Editions became the only two-tone versions of the Town Car.

==== Special editions ====
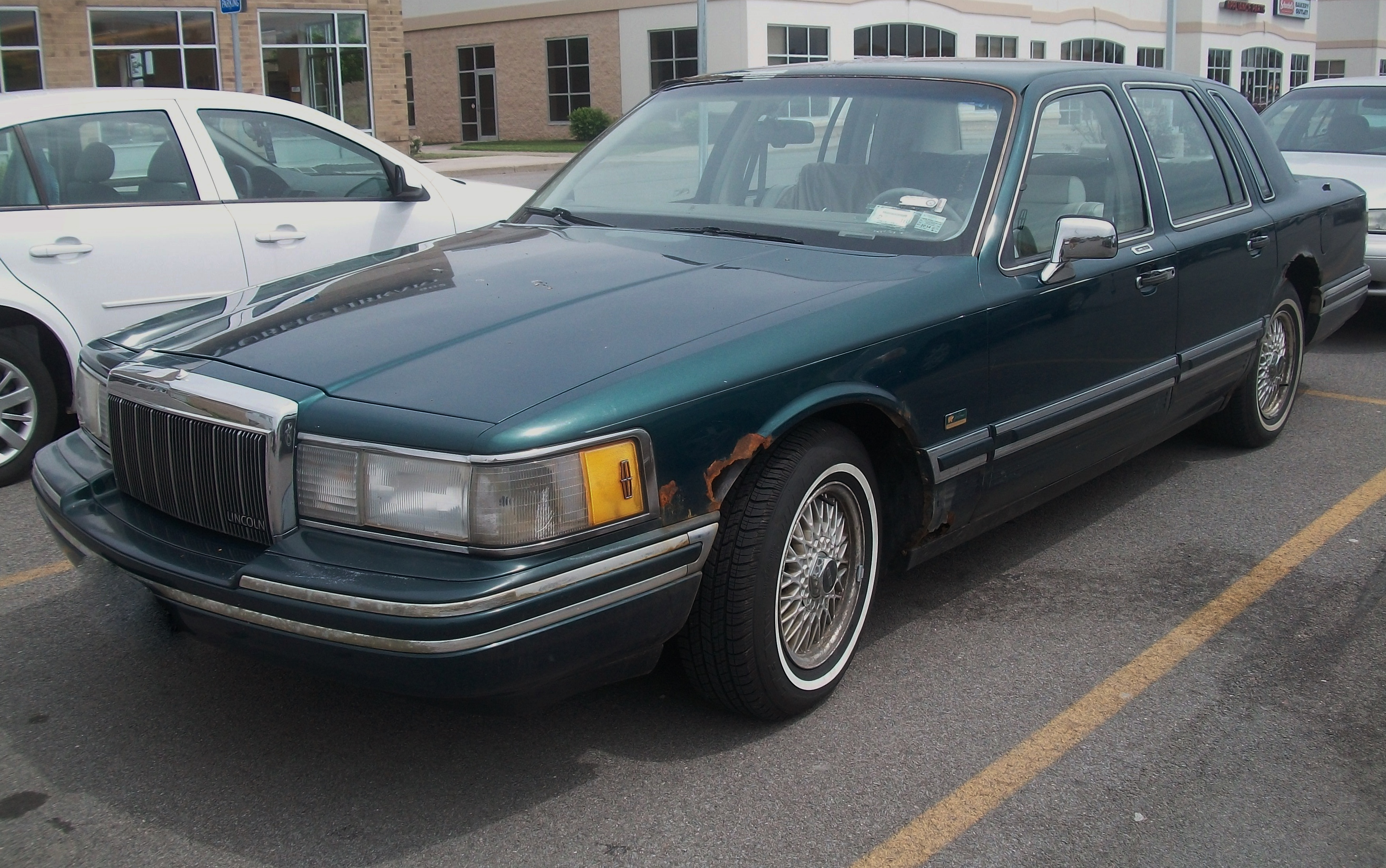
1992 Lincoln Town Car Jack Nicklaus Signature Series

In addition to the three standard trims of the Lincoln Town Car, various special edition option packages were produced by Lincoln (excluding dealer-produced versions).

Jack Nicklaus Signature Series (1992–1997)
The Jack Nicklaus Signature Series was a special-edition option package for the Town Car Signature Series that featured a green exterior paired with a white vinyl top. The interior included white leather seats accented by green piping as well as a Lincoln logo embroidered in green stitching on the seatback. Green carpets and floor mats rounded out the cabin's unique color scheme.

Another version of the package was sold with a white exterior and green vinyl roof; the interior trim was similar, with white leather seats and green carpets and trim.

Most Jack Nicklaus editions have gold-trimmed exterior ornamentation, including green and gold "Golden Bear" badges on the front fenders. Options included on 1992 through 1997 Jack Nicklaus Signature Series included memory seats with power and monotone paint.

Regatta Edition (1994)
The Regatta Edition was a maritime-themed special-edition option package for the Signature Series, with approximately 1,500 produced. The package consisted of White Oxford leather seats (with optional blue seat piping), with regatta blue carpeting; the doors and instrument panel featured matching blue-color trim.

The package was often paired with a white oxford vinyl carriage roof featuring embroidery on the C-pillar near the opera windows.

Spinnaker Edition (1995)
Replacing the Regatta Edition, the Spinnaker Edition option package featured tri-coat paint, two-toned leather seats, the Spinnaker logo on the floor mats, and 16" spoked aluminum wheels.

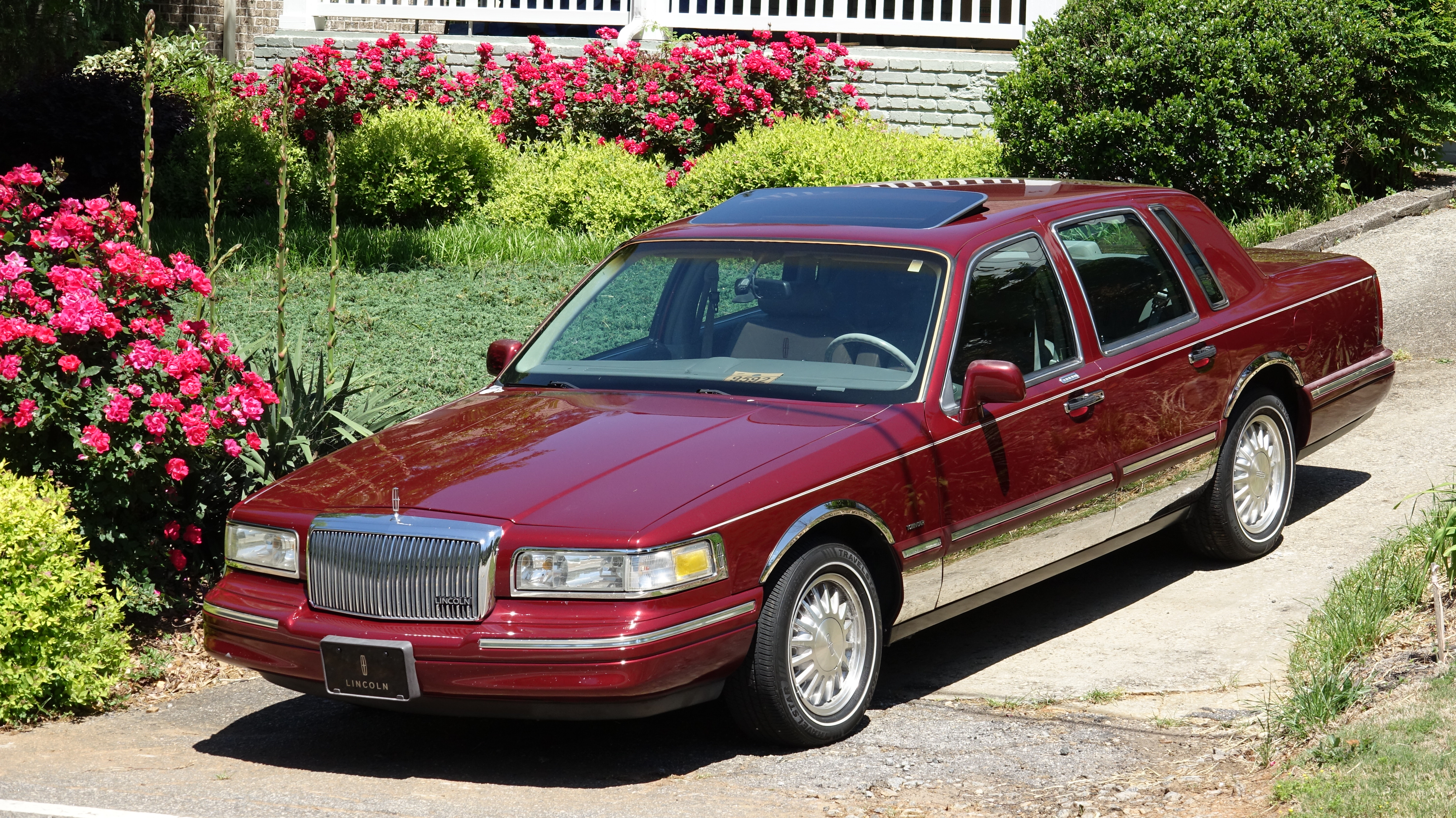
1996 Lincoln Town Car Diamond Anniversary Edition

Diamond Anniversary Edition (1996)
To commemorate the 75th anniversary of Lincoln in 1996, the division sold a Diamond Anniversary Edition of the Town Car Signature Series (alongside the Continental and Mark VIII). Featuring a unique accent stripe, leather seats, wood instrument panel trim, window badging, cellular telephone, power moonroof, JBL audio system, auto electro-chromatic dimming mirror with compass, and traction assist, the Diamond Anniversary Edition included nearly every available option on the Lincoln Town Car.

Cypress Edition (1996)
The Cypress Edition of the Signature Series featured Cypress Gold Frost exterior paint, a two-toned leather interior, and red Cypress tree badging.

=== Features ===
At its 1990 redesign, the Lincoln Town Car was offered with relatively few options, with nearly all features as standard equipment. On the Signature Series, the only options were leather seat trim, a moonroof, a 10-disc CD changer, a JBL sound system, a security system, and an onboard telephone.

The redesign highlighted several new features that had never been available before on the Town Car. A two-position driver's memory seat was standard on Cartier Editions (optional on Signature Series); the memory seats featured an 8-way adjustment for both seats and inflatable lumbar support. While technically a carryover feature from 1989, the Electrochromic Dimming Mirror was redesigned for the much wider rear window of the new Town Car.

A number of advances were made in the safety features available for the Town Car, with ABS becoming an optional feature in 1990. Following the return of 4-wheel disc brakes to the Town Car in 1991 (for the first time since 1979), ABS became standard in 1992. Initially, the 1990 Town Car came with dual front airbags as standard equipment. However, due to a March 14, 1990 fire at the facility where the passenger airbag's propellant was produced, the passenger airbag essentially became a delete option, with a credit on the window sticker issued for the price of the missing airbag. Upon the owner's request, for the price of the issued credit, the passenger airbag would be installed once supply became available. By the beginning of the 1992 model year, all Town Cars come equipped with dual airbags from the factory.

=== Production ===
Lincoln Town Car Production Figures
	Yearly Total
1990	147,160
1991	118,982
1992	109,094
1993	113,522
1994	113,008
1995	107,700
1996	90,763
1997	104,533
Total	904,762

=== Safety ===
National Highway Traffic Safety Administration (NHTSA) 1990 Lincoln Town Car Crash Test Ratings

- Frontal Driver:

== Third generation (FN145; 1998–2011) ==
Third generation (FN145)
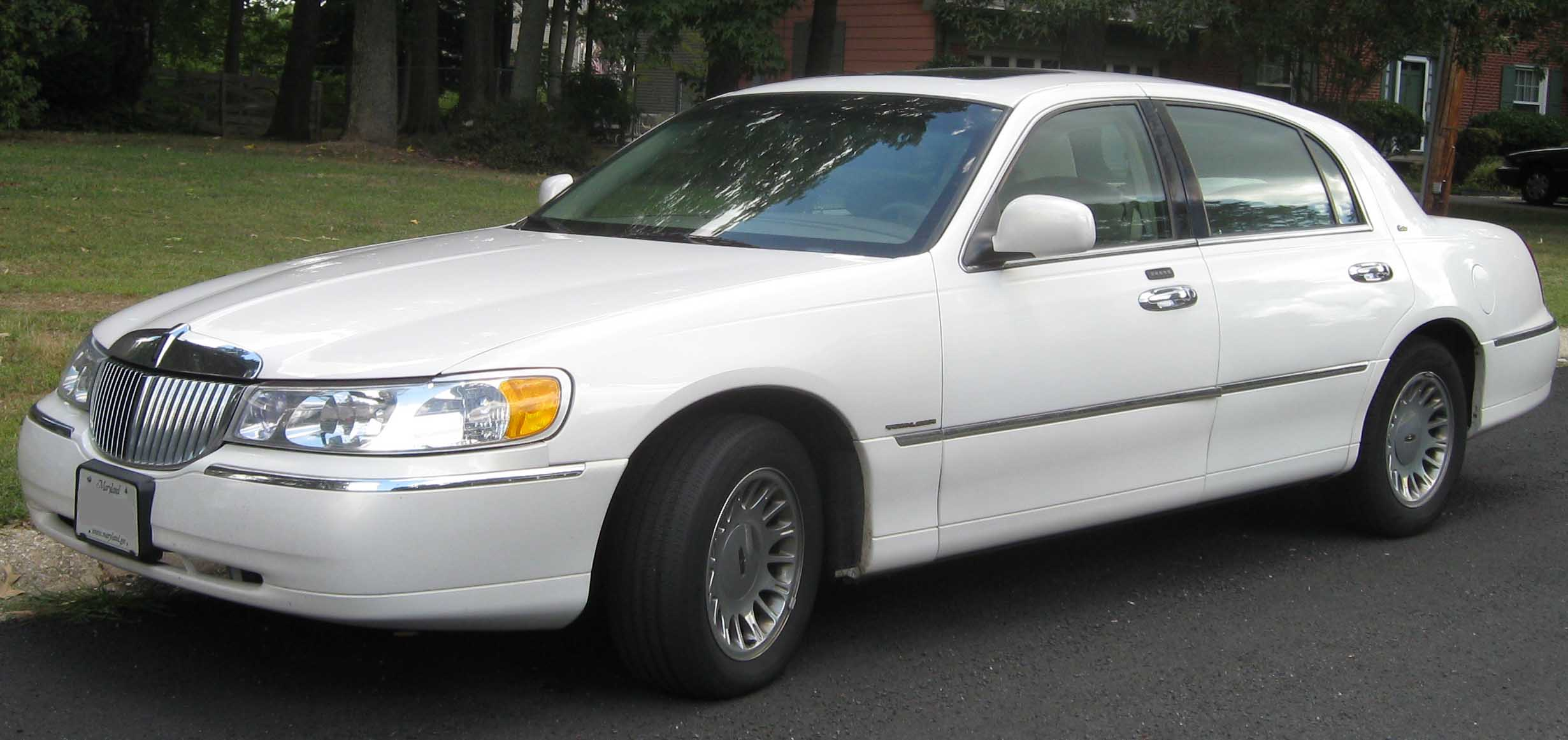
- 2001 Lincoln Town Car Cartier

Overview
- Also called: Lincoln Town Car L
- Production: October 1997 – August 29, 2011
- Model years: 1998–2011
- Assembly: United States: Wixom, Michigan (1998–2007); Canada: St. Thomas, Ontario (2008–2011); China: Changchun (1998–2005)
- Designer: Fritz Mayhew (1994)

Body and chassis
- Body style: 4-door sedan
- Related: Mercury Grand Marquis; Mercury Marauder; Ford Crown Victoria; Hongqi CA7460/Hongqi Qijian(红旗旗舰)

Powertrain
- Engine: 4.6 L Modular SOHC V8
- Transmission: 4-speed 4R70W/E automatic 4-speed 4R75E automatic

Dimensions
- Wheelbase: Town Car: 117.7 in (2,990 mm); Town Car L: 123.7 in (3,142 mm); China: 125.6 in (3,190 mm) (Hongqi Qijian CA7460L3); 157.1 in (3,990 mm) (Hongqi Qijian CA7460L1); 210.2 in (5,339 mm) (Hongqi Qijian CA7460L2)
- Length: 1998–2002 Town Car: 215.3 in (5,469 mm); 2003–2011 Town Car: 215.4 in (5,471 mm); 2001–2004 Town Car L: 221.3 in (5,621 mm); 2005–2011 Town Car L: 221.4 in (5,624 mm)
- Width: 1998–2002: 78.2 in (1,986 mm); 2003–2011: 78.5 in (1,994 mm)
- Height: 1998–2002: 58.0 in (1,473 mm); 2003–2008 Town Car: 58.6 in (1,488 mm); 2003–2008 Town Car L: 58.7 in (1,491 mm); 2009–2011 Town Car: 59.0 in (1,499 mm); 2009–2011 Town Car L: 59.1 in (1,501 mm)
- Curb weight: Town Car: 4,006–4,369 pounds (1,817–1,982 kg) Town Car L: 4,360–4,517 pounds (1,978–2,049 kg)

The third-generation Lincoln Town Car was released for the 1998 model year, debuting at the 1997 New York International Auto Show. Alongside extensive revisions to the suspension and brakes, the exterior and interiors of all three Panther-platform sedans underwent major updates; the Town Car was styled with a completely new body. Notably, Lincoln introduced the third-generation Town Car nearly concurrently with the Lincoln Navigator full-size SUV, joining it at the top of the Lincoln model line.

Coinciding with the redesign of the Town Car and the introduction of the Navigator, Lincoln-Mercury became the American brand of Premier Automotive Group, a Ford-created division to manage its premium brands acquired during the 1990s. Following organizational difficulties (leading to Lincoln returning behind Cadillac in sales by 2000), Lincoln-Mercury was restored under its previous divisional structure during 2002.

As part of The Way Forward, the Wixom Assembly Plant (home to all Lincolns since 1958, except for the Versailles, Blackwood, Aviator, and Navigator) was slated to close after 2007 production, initially putting the future of the Town Car at risk. For 2008, production was transferred to Ford Canada, moving to St. Thomas Assembly alongside the Ford Crown Victoria and Mercury Grand Marquis.

=== Chassis ===
For 1998, the Panther chassis returned, featuring multiple upgrades to the suspension and brakes. To improve braking performance, two-piston front brake calipers were added in addition to larger brake rotors (necessitating a move to 16-inch wheels from the driver-side fender well to the front of the engine ). On non-limousine vehicles, 4-wheel disc brakes were standard; limousines were fitted with rear drum brakes. Though the fundamental components of the front suspension remained, their mounting hardware was redesigned to improve both ride and handling characteristics. The solid rear axle suspension was further augmented by a Watt's Linkage to upgrade directional control.

For 2003, the platform underwent its largest update since its 1979 introduction, with the frame undergoing a complete redesign. To improve chassis rigidity (by nearly 25%), the frame rails were hydro-formed and fully boxed for their length. The steering system was upgraded to a speed-sensitive rack and pinion design; along with reducing weight and service complexity, the design improved steering precision. To further improve road manners, multiple suspension components were changed, including aluminum front lower control arms, new front upper control arms, updated steering knuckles, and coil-over front shocks. While the solid rear axle remained, the rear shocks were relocated outboard of the frame rails. To improve braking, a quieter EBD brake booster was fitted with mechanical panic assist, optimizing front/rear brake bias; the Town Car also moved to 17-inch wheels with a high positive offset (flat-face wheels).

==== Powertrain details ====
The third-generation Town Car carried over the 4.6L SOHC 16-valve V8 from the previous generation. Again offered in two configurations, the engine was retuned for 205 hp (single exhaust) and 220 hp (dual exhaust) outputs. In a functional change, the coil packs previously used were replaced by a coil-on-plug ignition system. Fail-safe cooling was introduced for the V8, including a two-speed electronic radiator fan. Several engine and chassis components were relocated as part of the redesign, with the coolant reservoir moving from the passenger fender well and onto the radiator fan shroud; the power steering reservoir was moved from the driver-side fender well to the front of the engine. For the 2001 model year, the 4.6L V8 received "Performance Improved" (PI) cylinder heads, which increased horsepower to 220 hp (single exhaust) and 235 hp (dual exhaust).

As with the previous generation, the Town Car (and all other Panther-chassis vehicles) used the 4R70W 4-speed automatic transmission.

As part of the 2003 revision, the dual-exhaust version of the 4.6L V8 became standard for the Town Car, retuned to 239 hp (shared with the Crown Victoria Police Interceptor, along with its numerically-higher 3.27:1 rear axle ratio). To reduce noise issues, exhaust-system hangers were relocated onto the frame rails. Several functional changes were made to the V8 engine, as the oil capacity was enlarged to 6 quarts; a variable-speed cooling fan replaced the previous two-speed unit. To improve emissions performance, the EGR system was updated and the fuel system became return-less. A new engine cover was added to the top of the engine; the shroud was now the mount for the power steering reservoir (previously bolted to the engine); the oil fill cap switched sides on the engine, with the fuse box also changing sides in the engine compartment. For 2005, the engine was fitted with electronic throttle control, moving cruise control functions to the engine computer; further electronic controls were added to the transmission (renamed the 4R70E). The 28-spline axle was replaced by an improved 31-spline unit; in a minor change, the Town Car received a heated PCV valve. The transmission underwent further internal revisions for 2006, becoming the 4R75E.

All Town Cars received Flex Fuel capability for 2009, enabling them to run on E85, gasoline, or any mixture of both.

Engine details, 1998–2011 Lincoln Town Car
Engine name	Displacement	Years produced	Output		Notes
Engine name	Displacement	Years produced	Horsepower rating	Torque output	Notes
Ford Modular SOHC 2V V8	4.6 liters (281 cu in)	1998–2000	205 hp (153 kW)	280 lb⋅ft (380 N⋅m) at 3,500 rpm	Single exhaust.
Ford Modular SOHC 2V V8	4.6 liters (281 cu in)	1998–2000	220 hp (164 kW)	290 lb⋅ft (393 N⋅m) at 3,500 rpm	Dual exhaust.
Ford Modular SOHC 2V V8	4.6 liters (281 cu in)	2001–2002	220 hp (164 kW)	265 lb⋅ft (359 N⋅m) at 4,000 rpm	Single exhaust, "Performance Improved" heads.
Ford Modular SOHC 2V V8	4.6 liters (281 cu in)	2001–2002	235 hp (175 kW)	275 lb⋅ft (373 N⋅m) at 4,000 rpm	Dual exhaust, "Performance Improved" heads.
Ford Modular SOHC 2V V8	4.6 liters (281 cu in)	2003–2011	239 hp (178 kW)	287 lb⋅ft (389 N⋅m) at 4,100 rpm	Dual exhaust, all trims.

=== Body ===
In contrast to the exterior redesign of the Ford Crown Victoria (which adopted much of the body of the updated Mercury Grand Marquis), the 1998 Town Car was redesigned with a completely new body and interior, sharing no commonality with either its predecessor nor its divisional counterparts.

==== Exterior ====
Three inches shorter than its 1997 predecessor, the 1998 Town Car was gained two inches in width and an inch in height (becoming the tallest Lincoln sedan in 40 years). Breaking from the straight-edged styling used by Lincoln sedans since early 1960s, the new exterior adopted a sleeker, curved design; while retaining traditional design cues, the Town Car also derived many styling elements from the Mark VIII and the 1995 redesign of the Continental. The radiator grille was reshaped as an oval, sharing some of its waterfall design with the Lincoln Navigator (the hood ornament was deleted). Similar to the smaller Continental, the third-generation Town Car moved from a six-window to a four-window roofline, with the nearly vertical rear window of the previous generation adopting a slight curve to its profile. In a reversal from 1997, "Town Car" badging returned to the front fenders, with trim badging returning to the C-pillar. Though changed in shape, the individual taillamp design feature returned (with centered Lincoln star emblems); the filler panel between them was deleted and replaced by a large chrome surround (the license plate mount was relocated from the rear bumper to the decklid).

For 2001, Lincoln introduced the extended-wheelbase Town Car L (see below). To reduce costs, 2001–2002 versions were produced by lengthening the rear door by widening the B-pillar door sheetmetal (retaining production door glass).

The 2003 redesign of the Town Car brought extensive, but evolutionary changes to the exterior. To bring the design closer in line with contemporary Lincoln vehicles, the lower body was squared off, with the front fascia redesigned in the style of the Lincoln LS. While the grille was integrated into the hood, the hood ornament made its return (after a 5-year absence). In several badging changes, the Town Car badges were removed from the front fenders and the Lincoln star emblems were deleted from the taillamps; the Town Car badge returned to the decklid (for the first time since 1997). The standard-wheelbase Town Car retained the same roofline, with the Town Car L receiving redesigned rear doors (with larger quarter windows). Dependent on trim level, several models of the Town Car replaced halogen headlamps with high-intensity/HID headlamps.

Following the 2003 redesign, the Town Car saw very few external changes. For 2007, the model line adopted restyled wheels. Coinciding with the relocation of production, the Town Car was offered with two designs of wheels (instead of four) from 2008 onward.

Pre-facelift

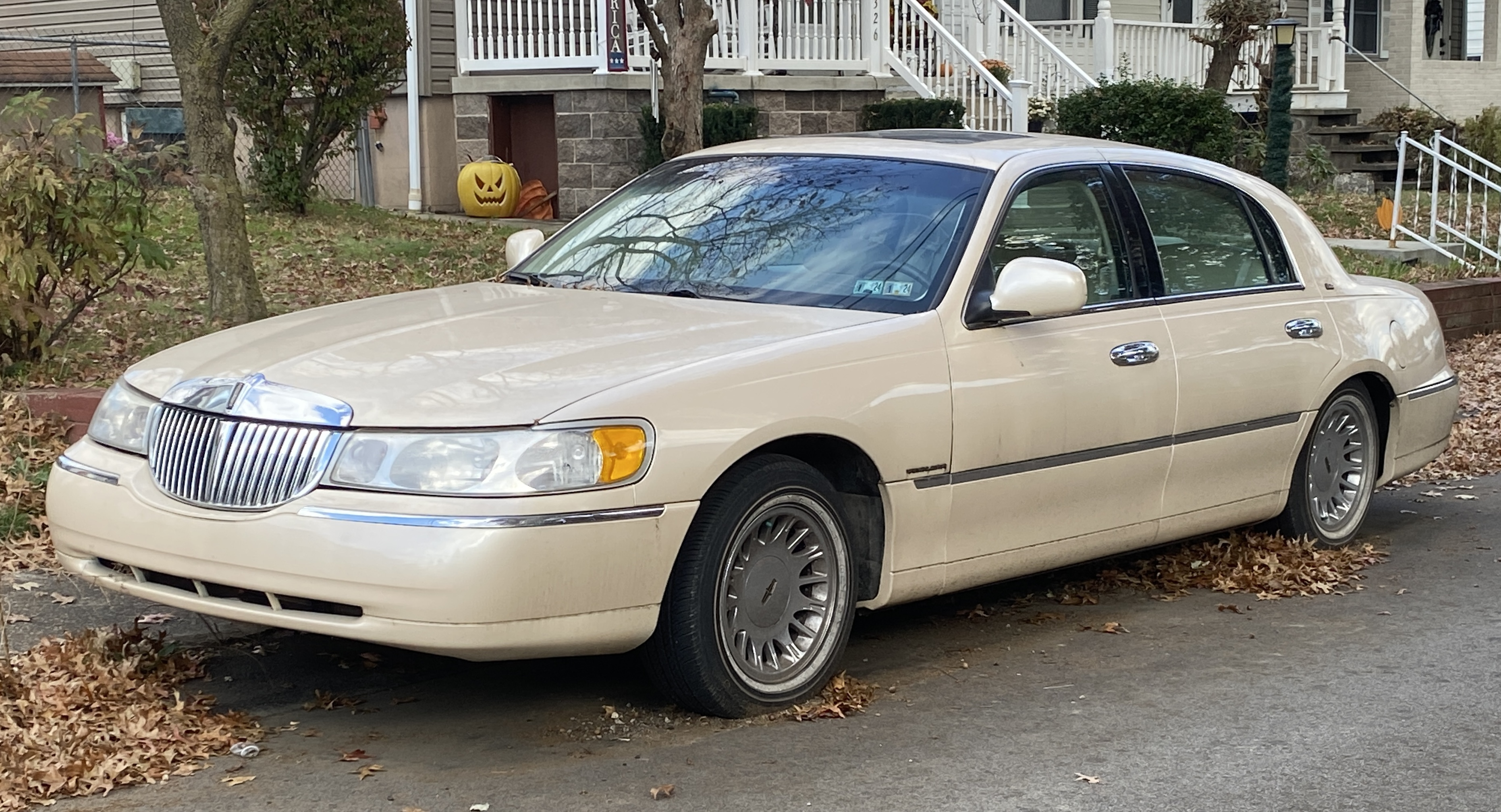
Front

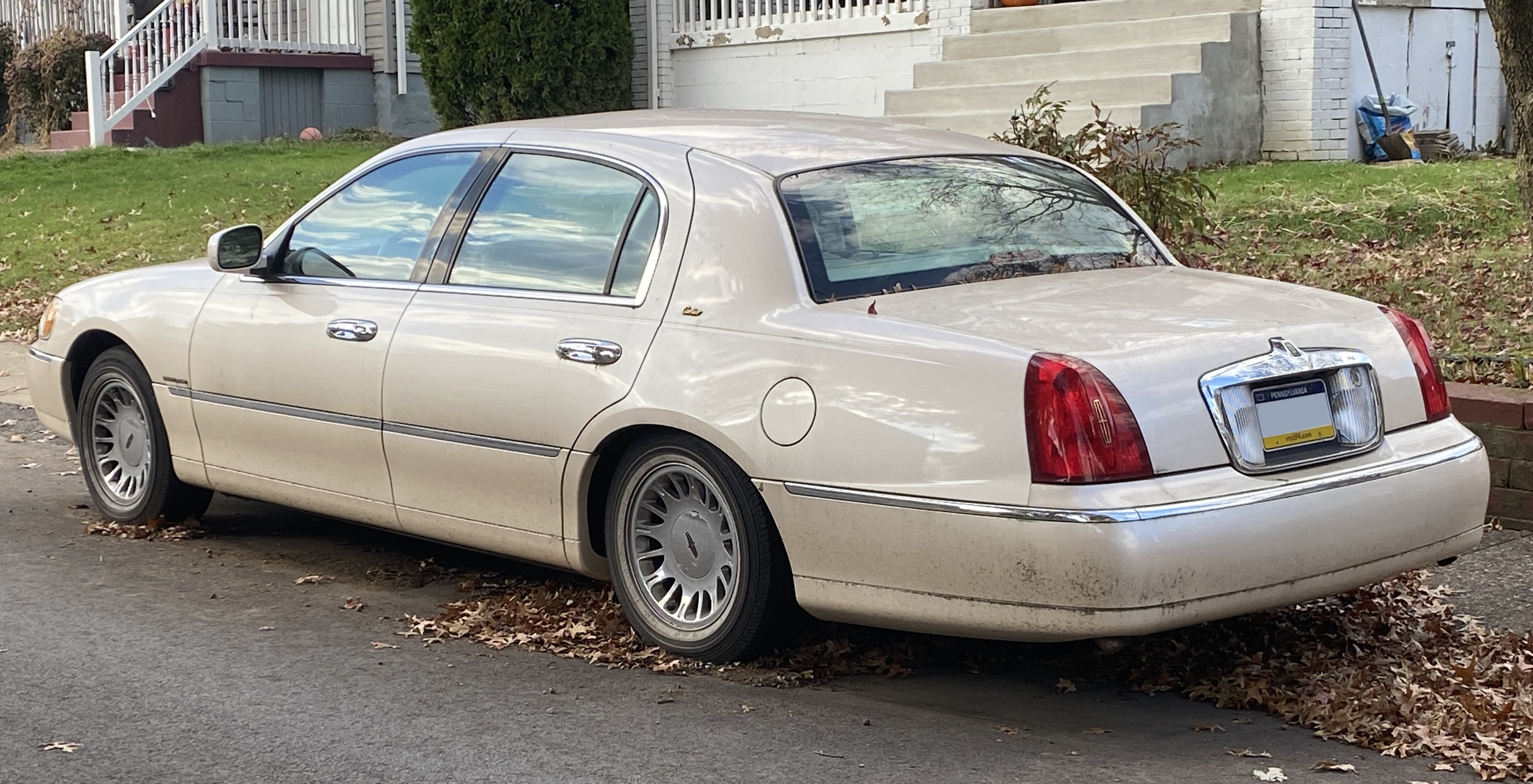
Rear

Facelift

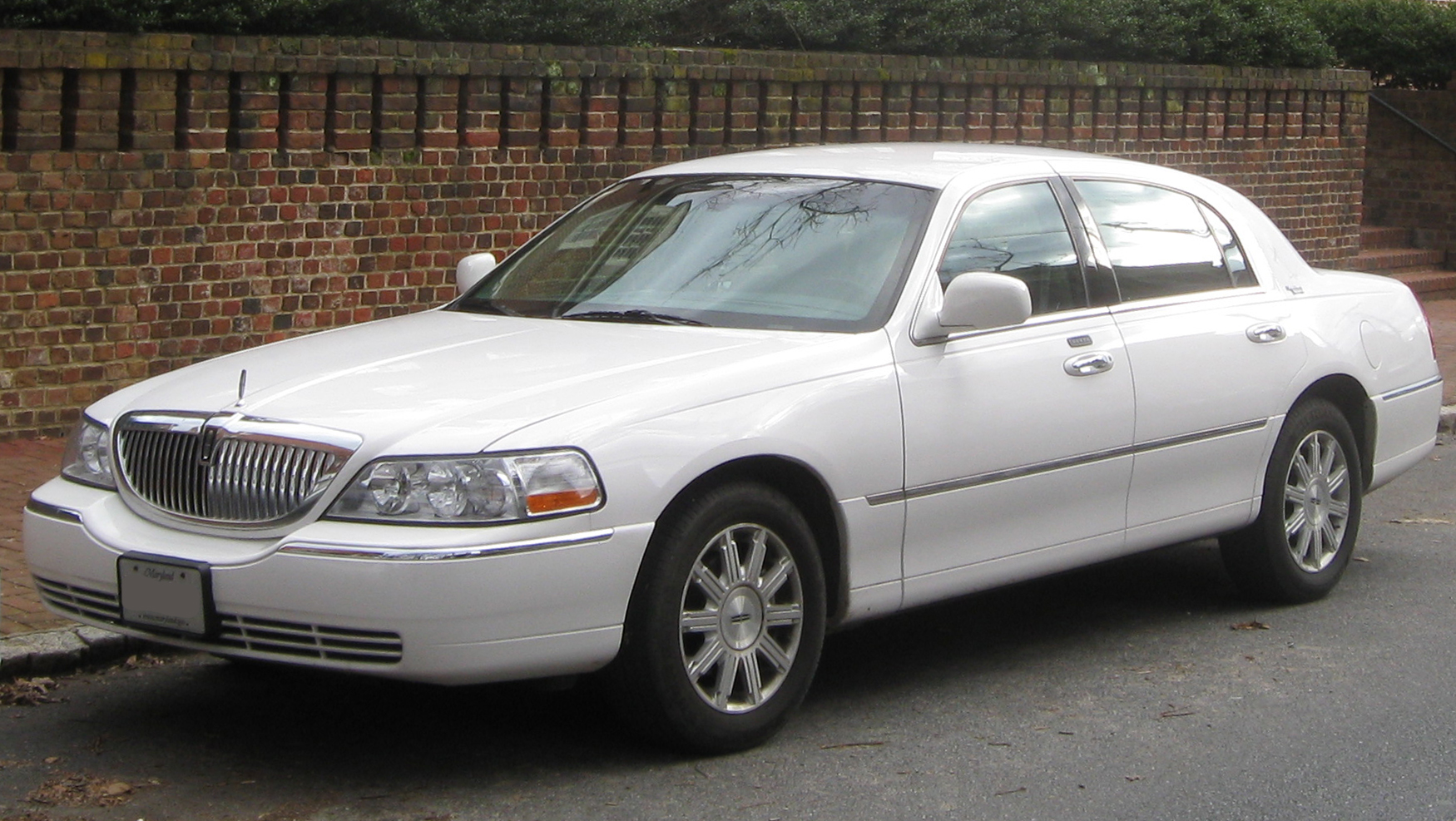
Front

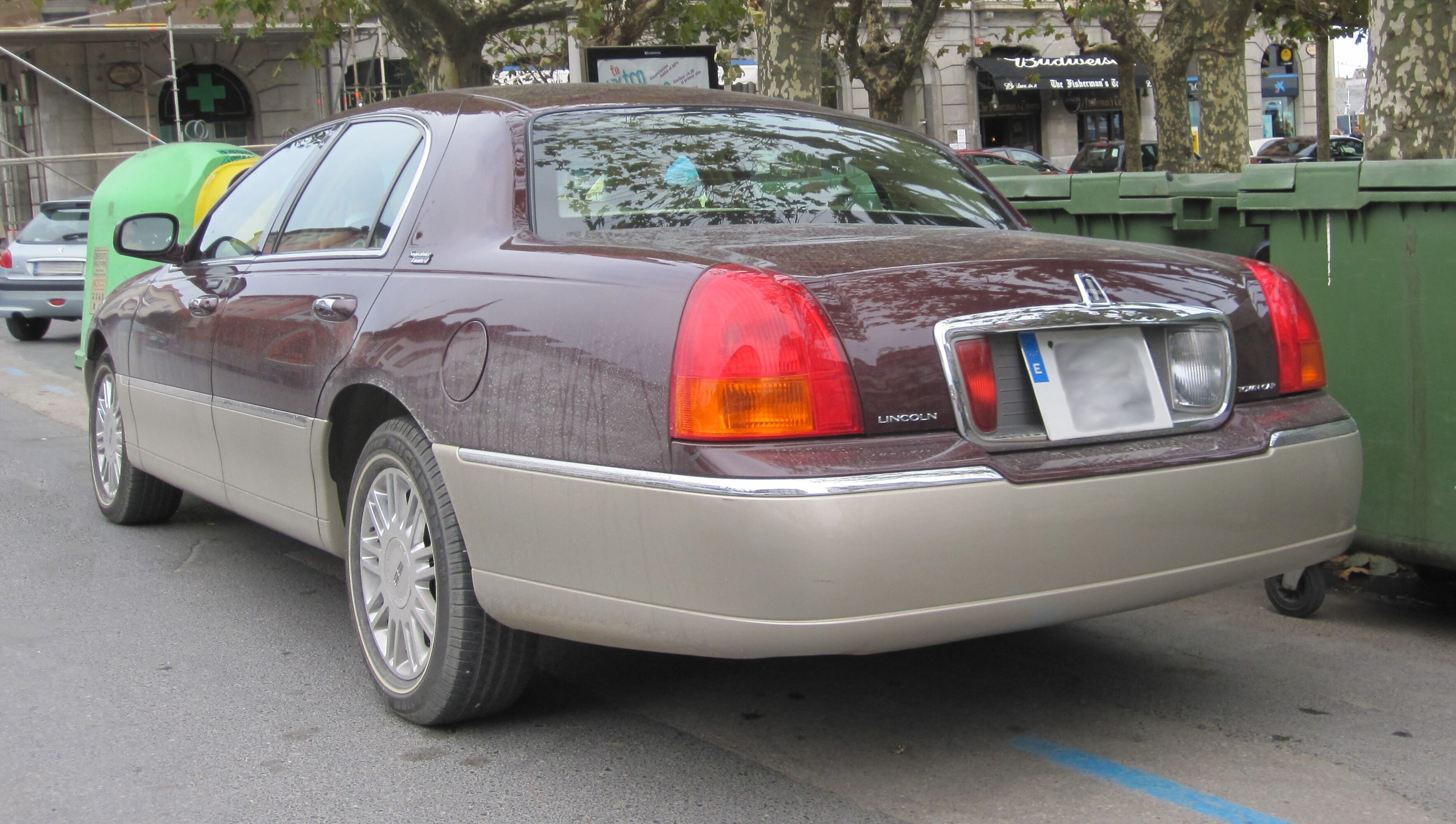
Rear

==== Interior ====
As with its predecessors, the third-generation Town Car shares few visible common components with its divisional counterparts, with the primary exceptions of the steering column and radio controls. The 50/50 split bench seat configuration used for over two decades was replaced by a 40/20/40 design; to better accommodate a third front passenger, the center section was fixed in place. The digital dashboard was retired in favor of an analog system (largely integrating the digital trip computer from the previous generation).

For 1999, the Town Car gained seat-mounted side airbags as standard equipment. The standard-trim Executive Series regained several features previously deleted, including a rear-seat center armrest and door-panel power seat controls (introduced for 1998 on Signature and Cartier trims). The in-car telephone of the previous generation was replaced by a portable Motorola Timeport telephone, introducing voice recognition; in response to the OnStar system introduced by GM, the Town Car adopted the RESCU telematics system introduced with the Continental, including a rearview mirror with its own microphone, adding SOS and roadside assistance buttons; the Rescu system was discontinued after the 2003 model year. In place of a telescoping steering column, the Town Car introduced power-adjustable brake/accelerator pedals for 2001.

In line with the body and chassis updates for 2003, the Town Car also saw functional changes to its interior. While much of the dashboard design remained carryover (with chrome largely replaced with satin-finish metal), the center stack saw a series of updates. While still using a double-DIN head unit, the radio and climate controls were redesigned and relocated (to occupy less space); previously offered only on Cartier trims, an analog clock was now standard (relocated from the center to the top). To add storage, the front-row cupholders were deleted from the ashtray and relocated to the base of the front center seat. Along with restyled upholstery, the outboard front seats were fitted with larger head restraints. On all trims, rear parking sensors became standard; a power-operated trunklid was offered on Cartier trims. To reduce production costs, storage pouches were deleted from the front seats as a running change.

For 2004, several features saw updates. As a flagship option, a touch-screen navigation system is introduced, integrating the 6-disc CD changer into the radio unit (the trunk-mounted changer also remained as an option); Sirius satellite radio was added as separate option. While the previous integrated cellular phone was retired, the system was replaced with optional Bluetooth connectivity, allowing drivers to use their phone and drive undistracted. For 2005, the interior went further functional change, as the satellite navigation system was upgraded to THX sound processing for its audio system (an option shared with the Lincoln LS). The dashboard saw visible change, as the Town Car received a new steering column (shared with the Mercury Grand Marquis, featuring a wood-topped steering wheel). The key lockout for the passenger airbag was deleted (functionally replaced by a weight sensor on the front passenger seat). For 2006, the instrument cluster underwent a complete redesign (for the first time since 1998), adding a tachometer to the Town Car for the first time, combining the two digital functions of the previous design into one.

Coinciding with the assembly relocation to St. Thomas, the Town Car underwent several feature changes for 2008. The DVD-based THX satellite navigation system was retired (the Lincoln LS the Town Car shared it with was discontinued after 2006); as cassette tapes were declining in use, the dual media stereo was also discontinued. In their place, the model line was standardized with the 9-speaker Audiophile system with the 6-disc in-dash CD changer. For 2009, federal safety regulations required a redesign of the window switches; subsequently, updated head restraints were introduced for 2011. For 2011, as supply ended for the model line, some units began to feature a front armrest lacking the bi-directional storage compartment.

Lincoln Town Car interior

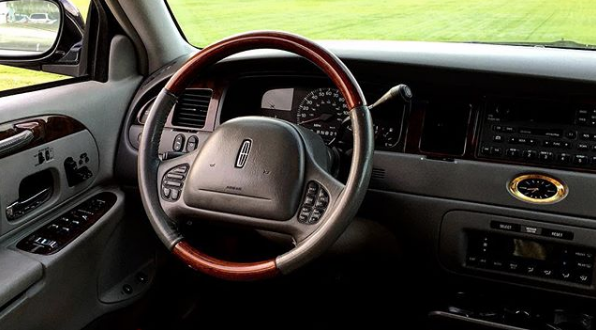
Dashboard (2001 Town Car Cartier)

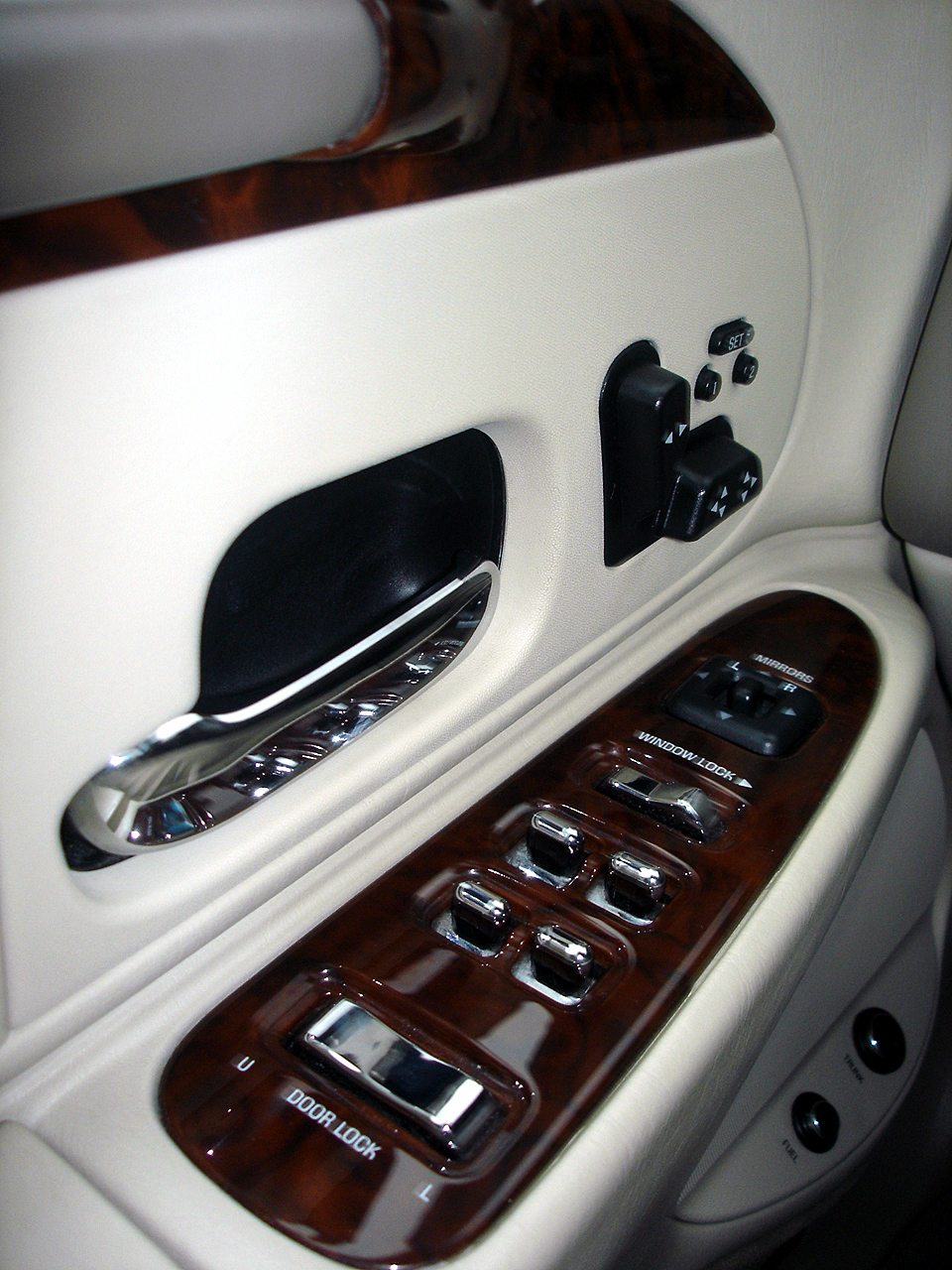
Door panel, showing seat and window controls

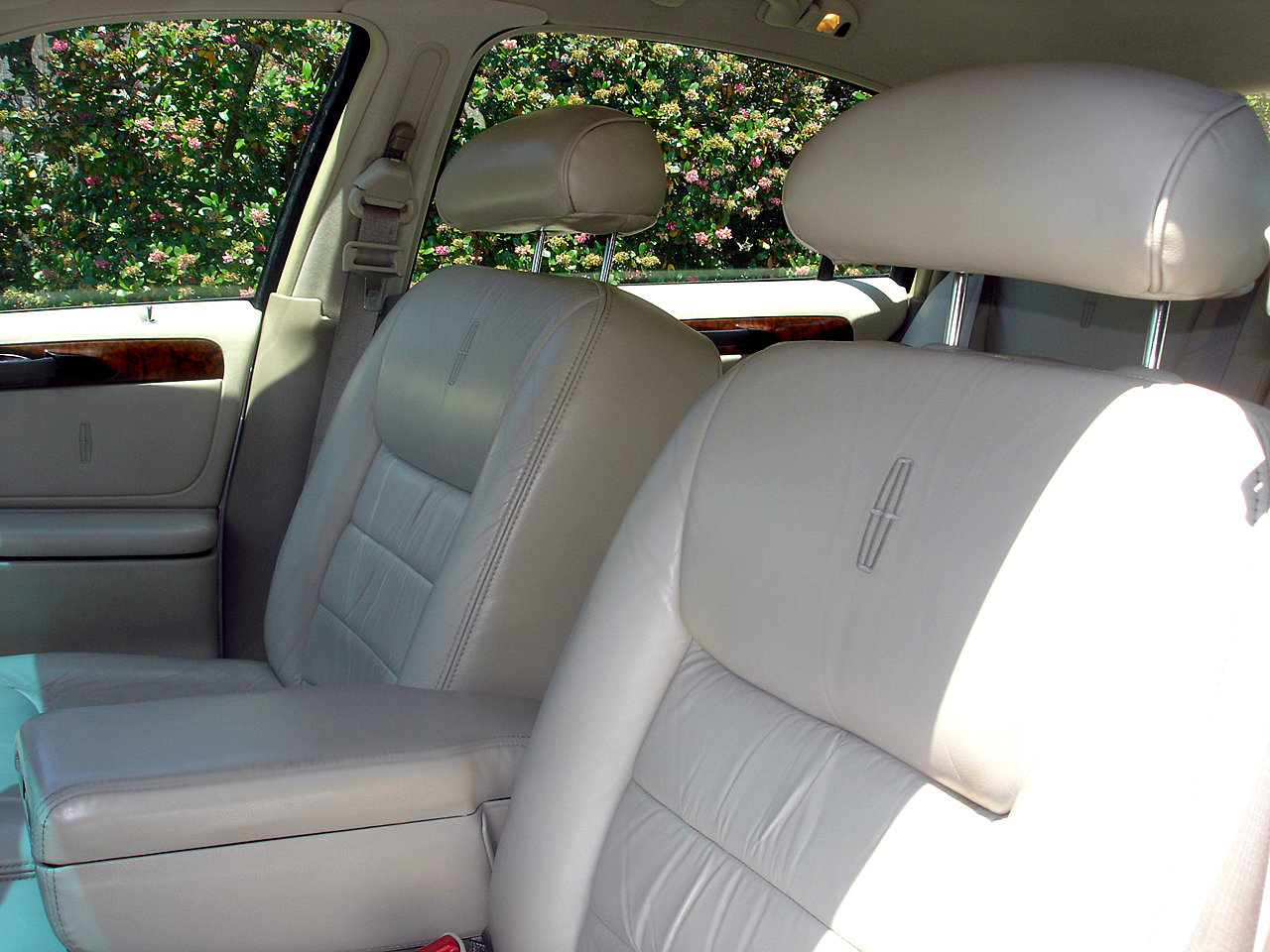
1998–2002 front seats (Signature Series)

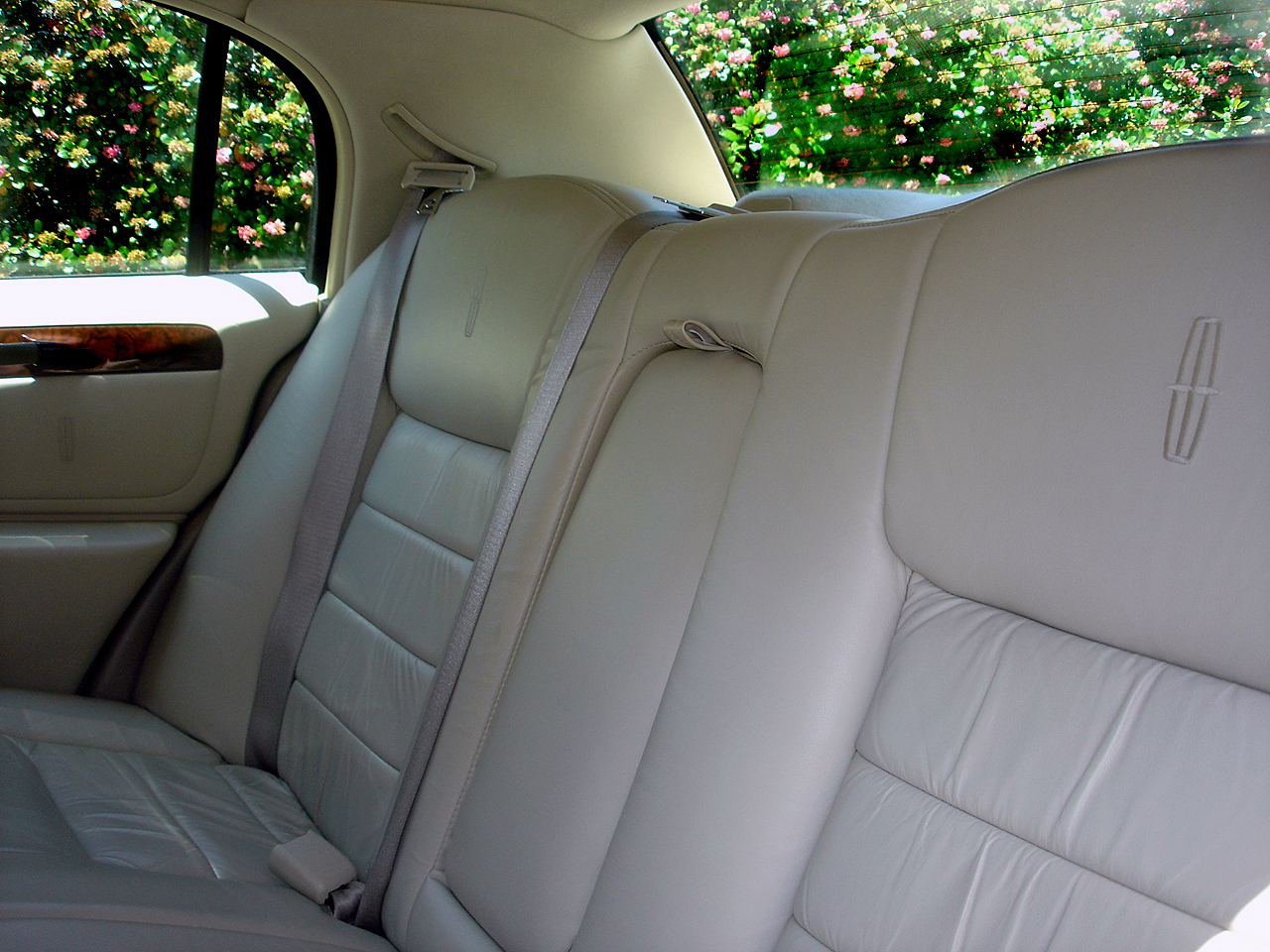
1998–2002 rear seats (Signature Series)

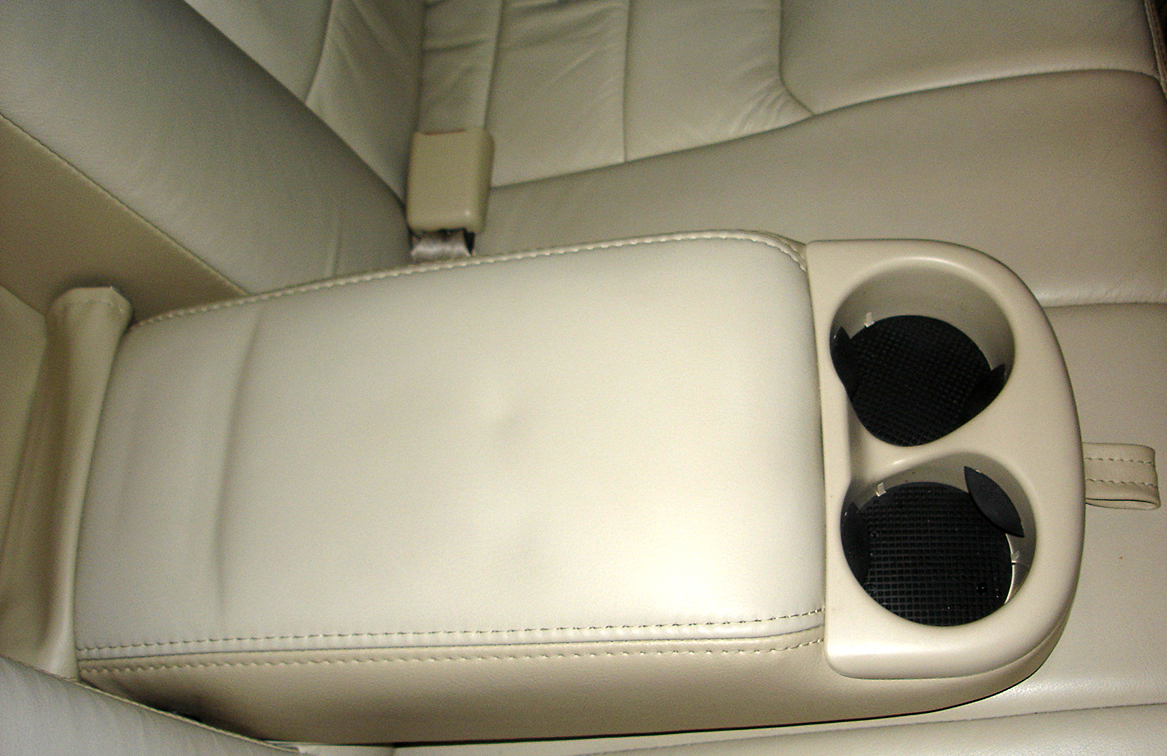
Rear-seat center armrest

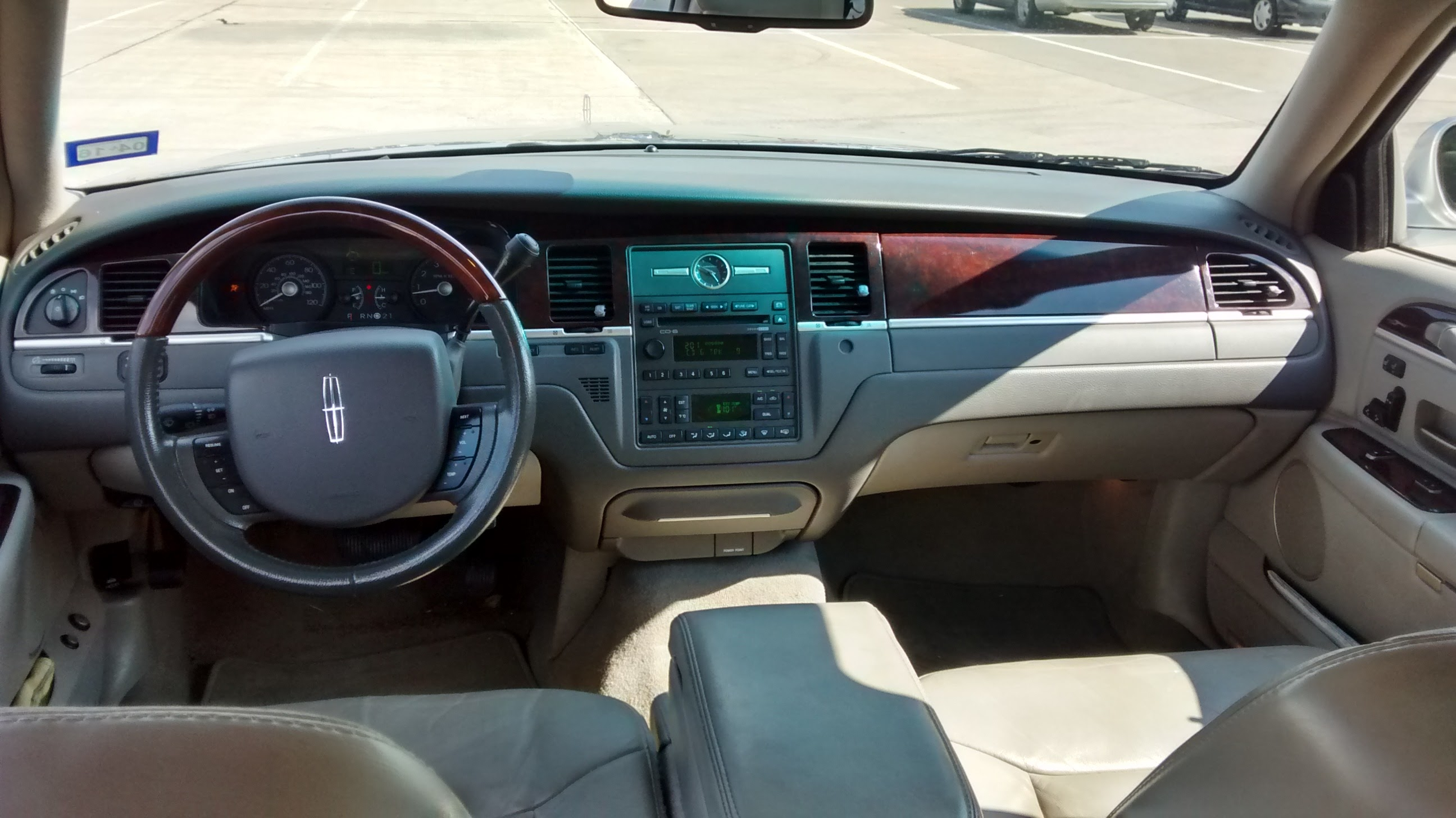
Interior of 2006 Lincoln Town Car Signature Limited Edition

=== Trim ===
The third-generation Lincoln Town Car was initially produced in four trim levels: Executive Series, Signature Series, Signature Series Touring Sedan, and Cartier; trims would be re-structured several times until the end of production in 2011.

The base Executive Series offered standard rear air suspension, Lincoln's SecuriLock anti-theft system, Lincoln's SmartLock anti-lockout system, automatic headlamps, heated mirrors, all-speed traction control, an electronic message center with Lincoln's "Tripminder", anti-lock brakes, leather seats with an 8-way power driver seat/6-way power passenger seat (cloth was optional for 1998, front passenger seat became 8-way power in 1999), leather-wrapped steering wheel with cruise control functions, a "Premium Sound" AM/FM/Cassette stereo with four speakers, electronic automatic temperature control (EATC), seat-mounted side airbags (1999 and newer), and 16-inch "Gear Tooth" aluminum wheels.

The mid-level Signature Series added a JBL (1998 only, Alpine for 1999–2003) AM/FM/Cassette stereo, a two-driver memory function for the driver seat and mirrors, an electronic auto-dimming rear view mirror, a front passenger lumbar function, a steering wheel with redundant audio/temperature controls, and 16-inch "Snowflake" aluminum wheels. Available options included heated front seats, a 9-speaker 145-watt audio system with digital signal processing, an auto-dimming driver mirror, a power moonroof, a six-disc CD changer, a wood-trim steering wheel, an integrated cellular phone, two-tone paint, and a Premium Package which consolidated several of the above options into one option package.

From 1998 until 2002, the Signature Series Touring Sedan was slotted above the Signature Series. In an attempt to draw in younger buyers who sought sportier features, it was Lincoln's counterpart to the Handling and Performance Package offered on the Crown Victoria and Grand Marquis. Touring Sedan models featured a 3.55:1 rear axle ratio for improved acceleration, a higher-stall 11.25-inch torque converter, dual exhaust, re-tuned suspension components with larger stabilizer bars and sport tuned steering, unique perforated leather seats, black birds-eye maple interior trim, an argent grille, monochromatic body-side moldings, and wider 16-inch "Chrome-Tech" wheels on touring tires. All available options, except two-tone paint, were shared with the Signature Series.

The top-trim Cartier added Cartier-specific leather seat trim; the seats had Cartier logos stitched into the seat-backs and unique upholstery. Cartier insignias were also found on the interior door straps (1998–2002) and floor mats. In addition, an analog "Cartier Clock" was placed in the center of the dash above the climate controls. Moreover, heated front seats were standard. Cartier specific features also carried over to the exterior with a black "Lincoln Star" front fascia badge and a black Cartier badge on the trunk-lid. Furthermore, the Cartier received 16-inch "Cartier" chrome wheels. Like the Signature Touring Sedan, dual exhaust was standard. The Cartier shared several of its free-standing options with the Signature Series, and even offered the same Premium Package as an option. Lastly, a Gold Package was offered as optional equipment; it featured gold-color exterior badging.

For 2001, the trim levels were expanded as a six-inch extended wheelbase Town Car was introduced and marketed towards livery and limousine services. To accommodate the extended wheelbase, the B-pillars were widened; this was also done to facilitate the use of the same rear door glass from the standard-wheelbase version. It was offered as both an Executive and Cartier version (named Executive L and Cartier L). According to Lincoln, the extended wheelbase offered an additional 7.8 cubic feet of passenger volume. Additionally, the Cartier L was equipped with rear illuminated vanity mirrors, heated rear seats, 4-way adjustable rear head restraints, and a center armrest that featured redundant controls for the radio, climate controls, and front passenger seat track to allow for more legroom.

For 2002, the Premium Package (included a moonroof and six-disc CD changer) became a standalone trim level and was slotted above each respective trim that it was based on (Premium Signature Series, Premium Signature Touring Sedan, and Premium Cartier); it was not offered for the Executive Series or as an extended wheelbase version.

For its 2003 update, the Signature Series Touring Sedan was dropped from the lineup. The "Series" suffix was also dropped from the Executive and Signature (on sales brochures, in 2004). In addition, the long-wheelbase Executive L was restricted to fleet sales.

In 2004, several changes were made to the trim lineup. All Premium trims were dropped, and the standard wheelbase Executive was restricted to fleet sales. Furthermore, all iterations of the Cartier were discontinued; they were replaced by the new range-topping Ultimate/Ultimate L. The Ultimate trim was short-lived, as it was discontinued for 2005.

Trim levels were once again re-structured for 2005 as the Town Car was now offered in three trim levels for retail sale: Signature, Signature L, and Signature Limited. As a replacement for the Ultimate L, the Signature L featured the same "Rear Seats Amenities Package"; it included heated rear seats, 4-way rear passenger headrests, dual rear cup holders with a tissue bin, rear seat illuminated visors, and a center armrest that featured redundant controls for the radio, climate controls, and front passenger seat track to allow for more legroom. In contrast to its fleet-sales only Executive L counterpart, the Signature L offered heated front and rear seats, a wood-trim steering wheel, as well as a DVD-based satellite navigation system (until 2008).

The new top-trim Signature Limited included a Soundmark Audiophile dual-media AM/FM/CD/Cassette radio with digital signal processing, 8 speakers, a subwoofer, and a 150-watt amplifier; heated front seats; power adjustable pedals with memory; an easy entry/exit driver seat; a full power trunk lid; power moonroof; as well as a wood-trim steering wheel. Available options for the Signature Limited included HID headlamps, a THX-certified audio system with satellite navigation, a power moonroof, a trunk organizer, 17-inch fluted aluminum wheels, and two-tone paint; all optional equipment (except the moonroof) was shared with the Signature L.

In 2006, a Designer series trim was introduced and slotted above the Signature Limited as the new flagship Town Car. Designer models included a Provence leather interior with two-tone door panels, adjustable rear-seat headrests, brushed aluminum scuff plates, additional chrome exterior trim, and 17-inch 18-spoke chrome-aluminum wheels.

Coinciding with the shift in assembly plants, for 2008, the base Signature and top-trim Designer were permanently discontinued, leaving the Signature Limited and extended wheelbase Signature L as the sole remaining models for retail sale until the end of production in 2011; the fleet-only Executive and Executive L would also continue until 2011. Furthermore, many available options were standardized or deleted outright, leaving HID headlamps, daytime running lamps, white-wall tires, 17-inch 18-spoke chrome-aluminum wheels and a trunk organizer as the only remaining options.

=== Special editions ===
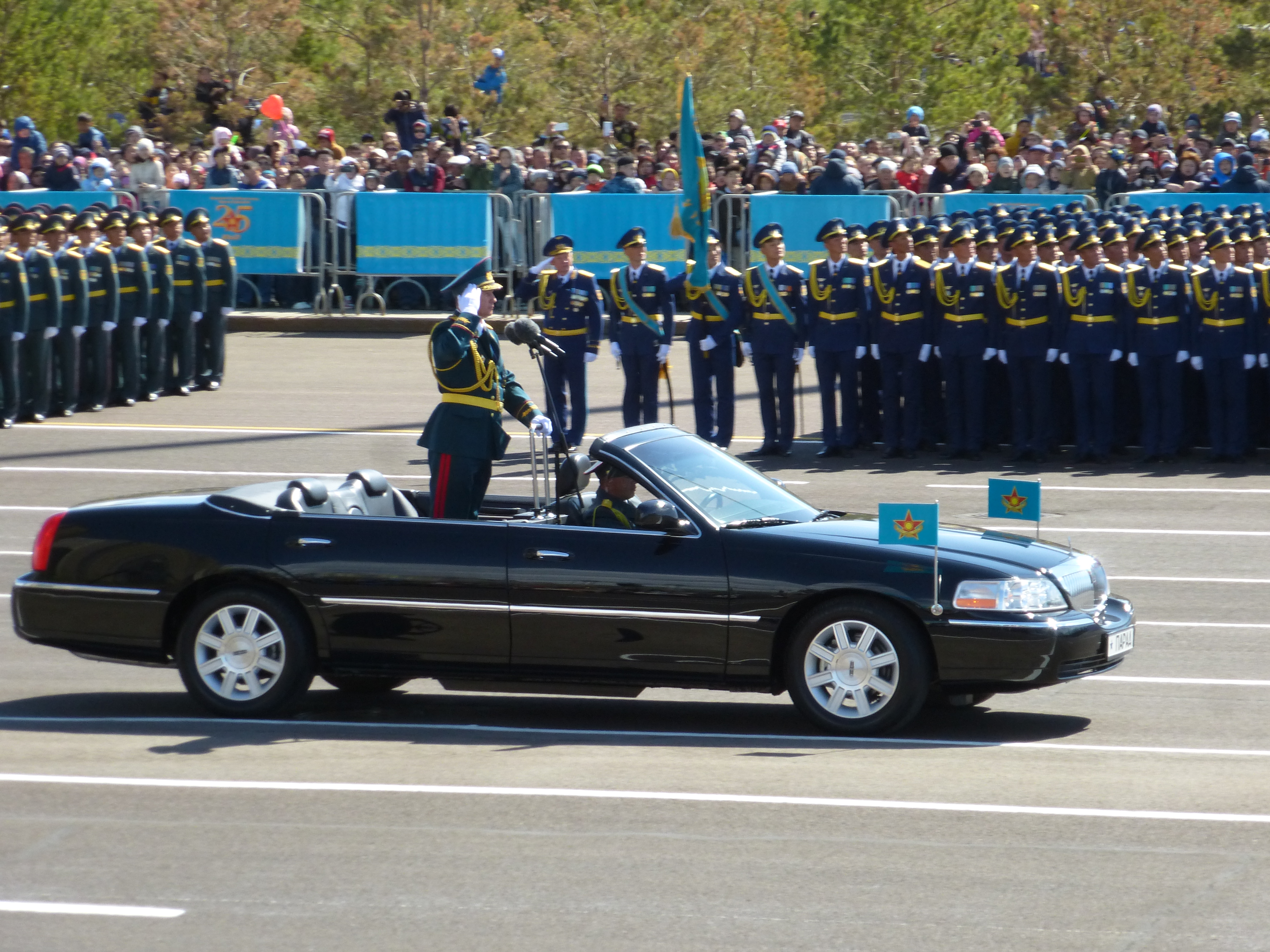
Major General Murat Bektanov, Commander in Chief of the Kazakh Ground Forces, commanding a military parade on Independence Square, Astana in a 2003 Lincoln Town Car

Limited Edition
From 2003 to 2004, Lincoln offered a Limited Edition package for the Ultimate trim; it had Limited badges on the C-pillar, fog lights, heated and memory seats, as well as Arden inserts in the rims and grille. For 2005, the Limited Package was now offered on the Signature Limited with two-tone paint schemes (in addition to two-tone seats); the fog lights were also deleted from the package.

Pro Series
Offered in 2004, a special Pro-series badge was placed on the C-pillars; having the background of a golf course. This badge was stitched onto the front seats, in addition to having chrome 9-spoke rims and a two-tone color scheme.

25th Anniversary Edition
Lincoln commemorated the 25th anniversary of the Town Car by offering a 25th Anniversary Edition package on the 2006 Signature Limited. The package included chrome B-pillar and door handles, unique Eucalyptus wood applique and matching steering wheel with wood inserts, scuff plates with "25th Anniversary Edition" and "25th-anniversary" badging, Provence leather individual 40/20/40 lounge seating with individual comfort, shirring, contrast piping and rear seat adjustable headrests, fog lamps, and 9-spoke chrome wheels.

Continental Edition
Offered in 2010–11 was the Continental Edition package; available as an option only on the Signature Limited trim. The package added Continental badging, chrome 17-inch wheels, and accents to the B-pillars. On the interior, the Continental name was embroidered on the front seats and front floor mats.

=== Safety ===
The Lincoln Town Car was the first production sedan in the world to receive US five-star crash ratings in every category.

National Highway Traffic Safety Administration (NHTSA) 2003 Lincoln Town Car Crash Test Ratings (with side airbags)

- Frontal Driver:
- Frontal Passenger:
- Side Impact (Driver):
- Side Impact (Passenger):
- Rollover:

National Highway Traffic Safety Administration (NHTSA) 1998* Lincoln Town Car Crash Test Ratings (with side air bags)

- Frontal Driver:
- Frontal Passenger:
- Side Impact (Driver):
- Side Impact (Passenger):
- Rollover: N/A

Lincoln Town Car IIHS scores
Moderate overlap frontal offset	Acceptable* (2003 models built before June 2003)
Moderate overlap frontal offset	Good (late 2003–2011)
Head restraints & seats	Marginal* (2003–2010)

- Due to late airbag deployment and resultant injury risks, the Town Car was rated only "Acceptable" in the frontal offset test. Lincoln modified the deployment characteristics for the driver airbag in May 2003, which led to an improved rating of "Good" in the re-test.
- Head restraints were updated for 2011, however, they were not re-tested by the IIHS.

== Variants ==
=== Trim level timeline ===
Lincoln Town Car Timeline
Trim level	1980s									1990s										2000s										2010s
Trim level	'81	'82	'83	'84	'85	'86	'87	'88	'89	'90	'91	'92	'93	'94	'95	'96	'97	'98	'99	'00	'01	'02	'03	'04	'05	'06	'07	'08	'09	'10	'11
Entry	Base										Executive Series													Signature Series				Signature Limited
Mid-level	Signature Series																								Signature Limited
High-end	Cartier Series																							Ultimate		Designer Series
L																				Cartier L				Ultimate L	Signature L
Fleet																								Executive L

=== Livery variants ===
Featuring a standard V8 engine, body-on-frame design, rear-wheel drive and large exterior and interior dimensions, the Town Car became popular in livery and commercial service. In commercial service, the typical Lincoln Town Car saw a life expectancy of well over 400,000 miles. Its basis on the Ford Panther chassis gave it powertrain and suspension commonality with the Mercury Grand Marquis and the Ford LTD Crown Victoria (later the Crown Victoria). This design made them durable even in the rough conditions taxi and livery cars are subjected to, and easy and cheap to repair when they did suffer damage.

The Lincoln Town Car was popular as a stretch limousine donor chassis; it was the most commonly used limousine and chauffeured car in the United States and Canada. Hearses and funeral cars were also built on the Town Car chassis, through Ford's QVM program; the chassis was modified by coachbuilders for use in the funeral business, though Cadillac has always dominated in this market.

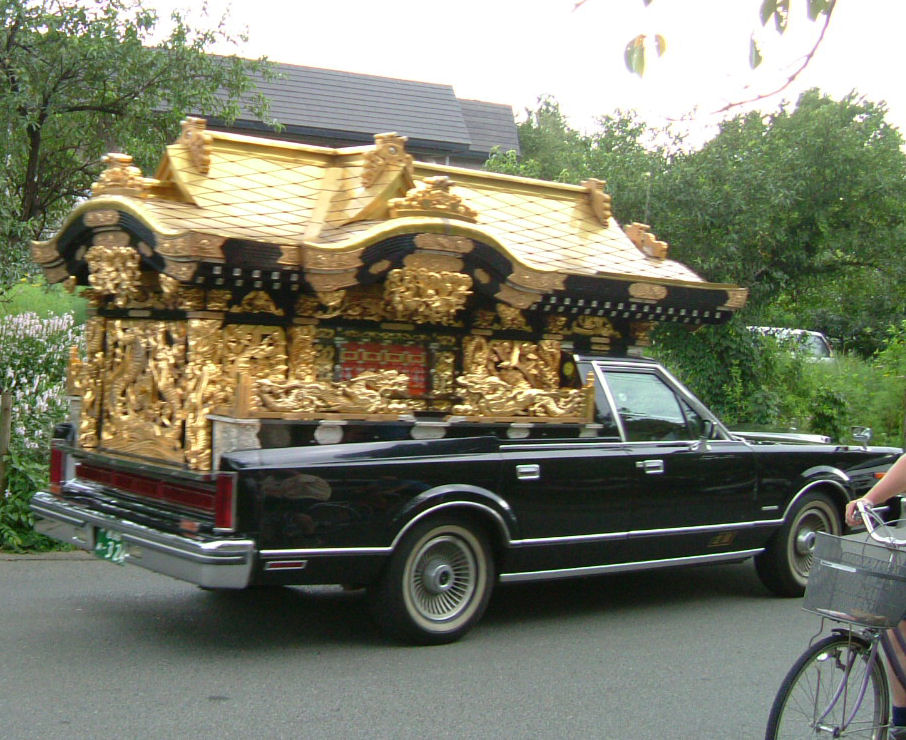
1981–1985 Lincoln Town Car Buddhist hearse conversion in Japan

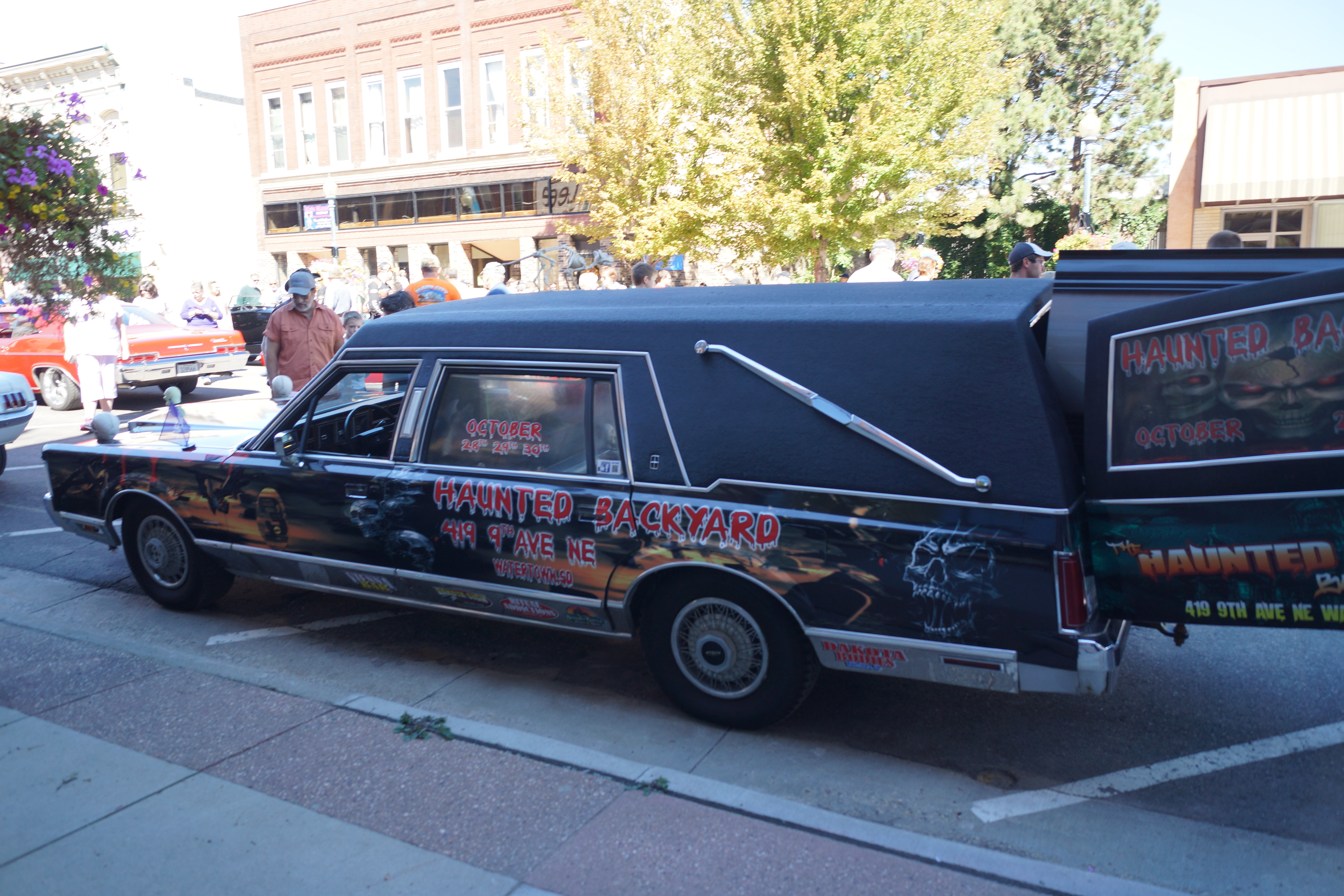
1982 Lincoln Town Car hearse (customized)

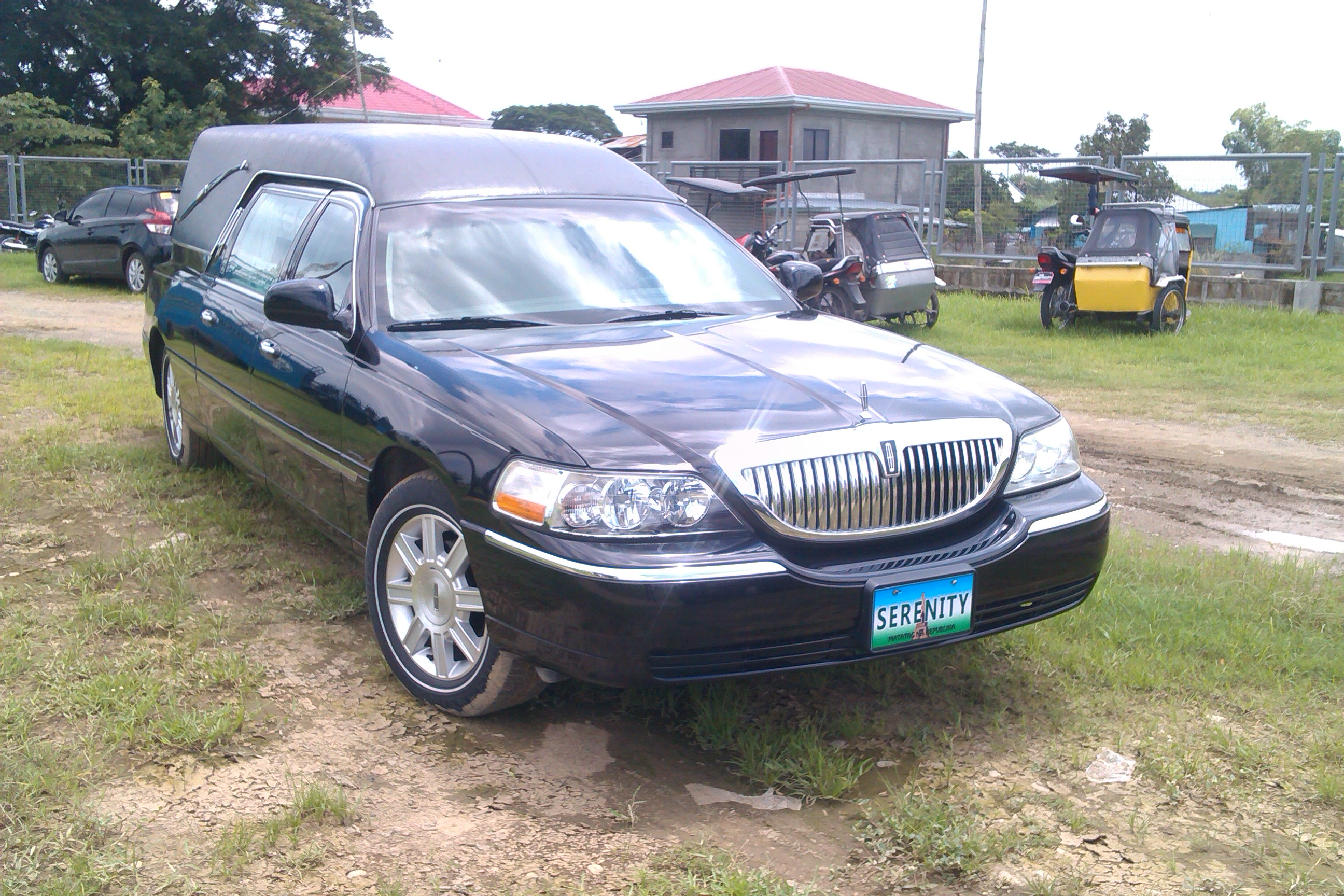
2011 Lincoln Town Car hearse in Philippines

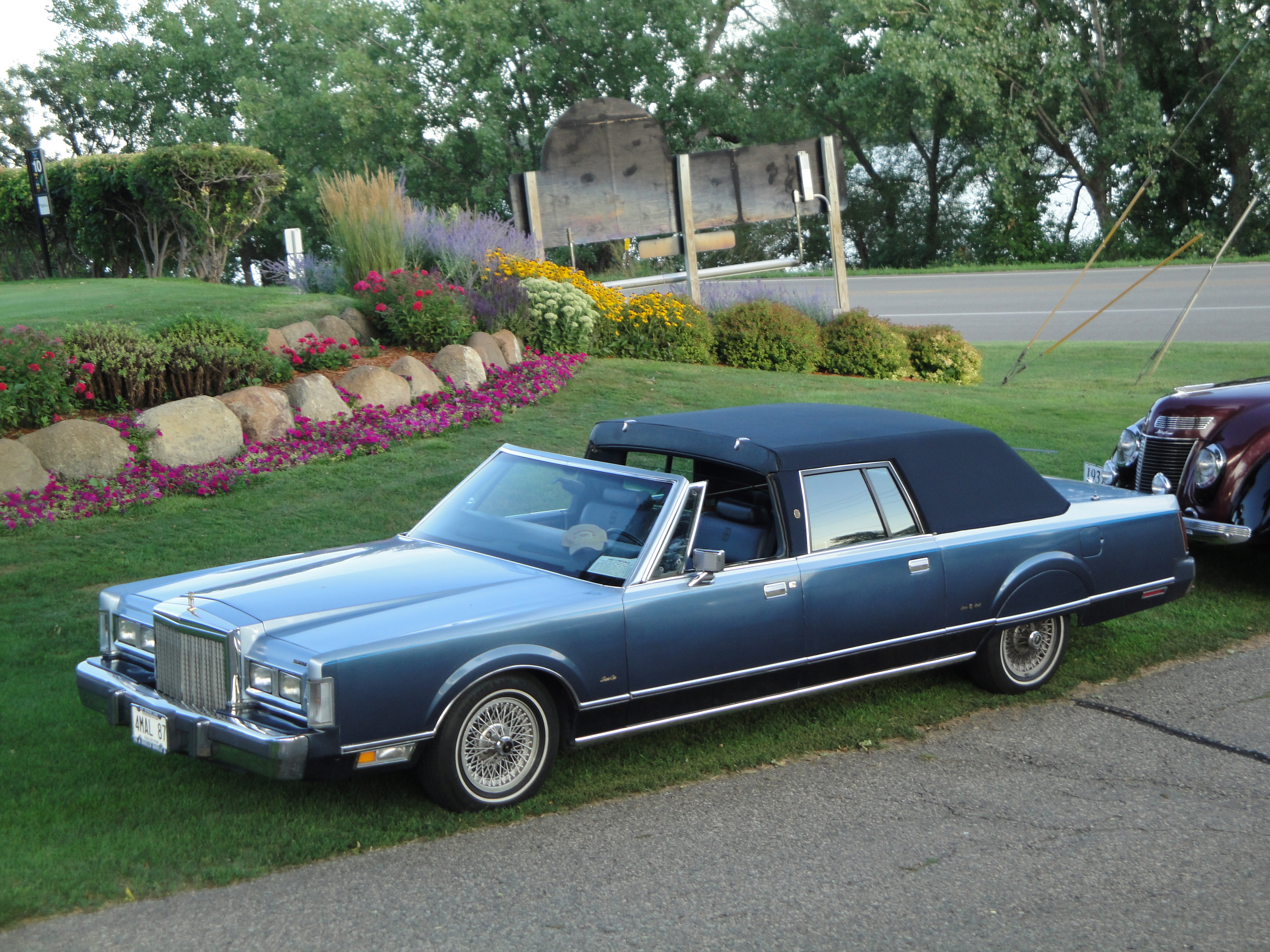
1987 town-car style formal limousine (Brougham bodystyle)

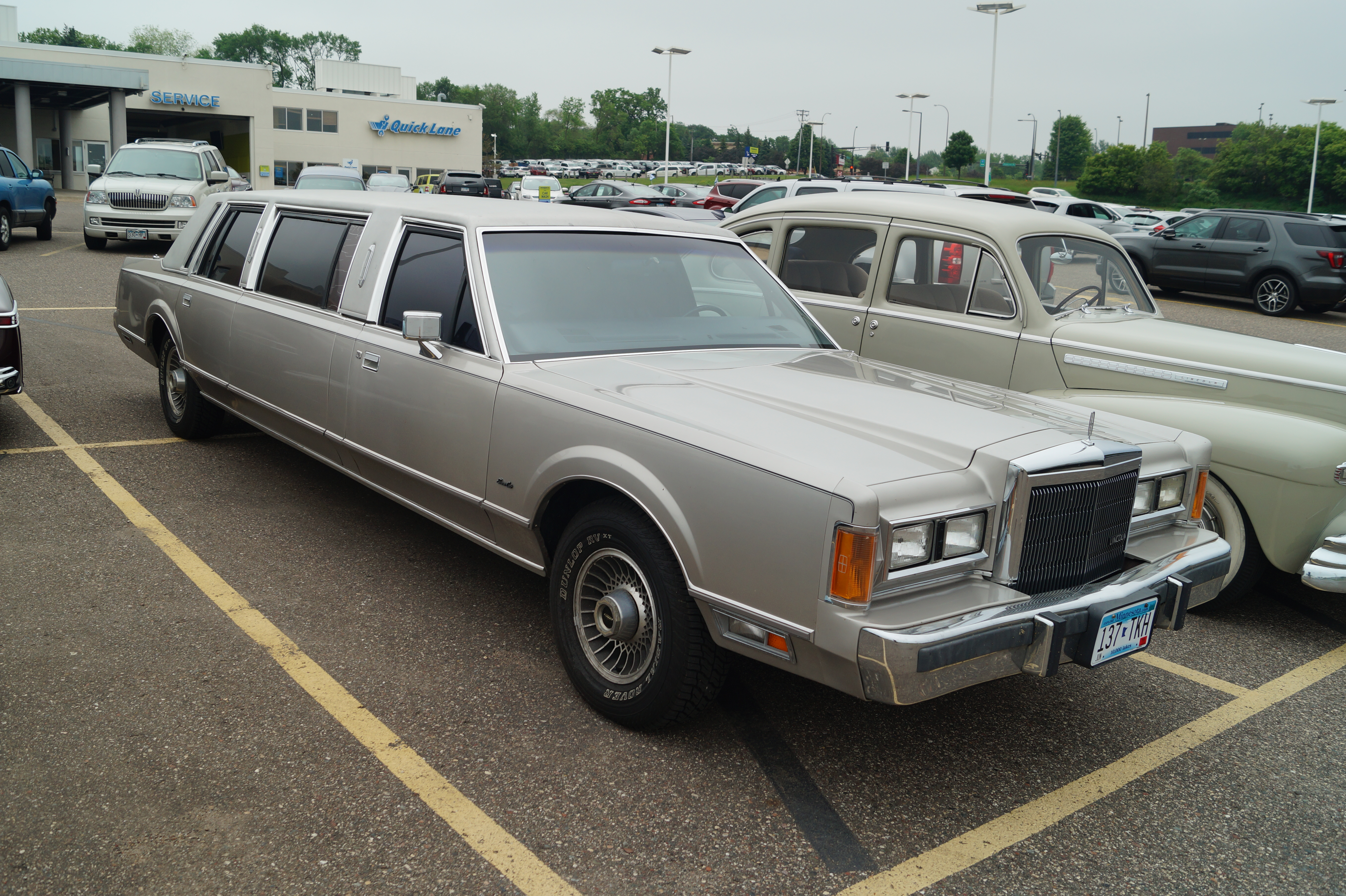
1989 stretch limousine in Minnesota

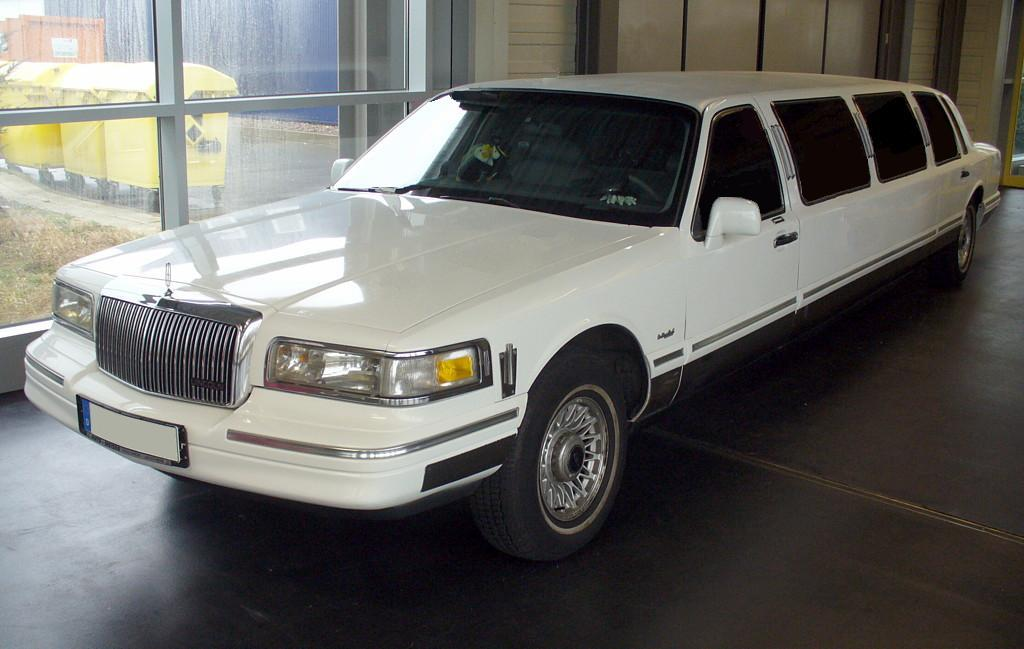
1995–1997 stretch limousine (approximately 120")

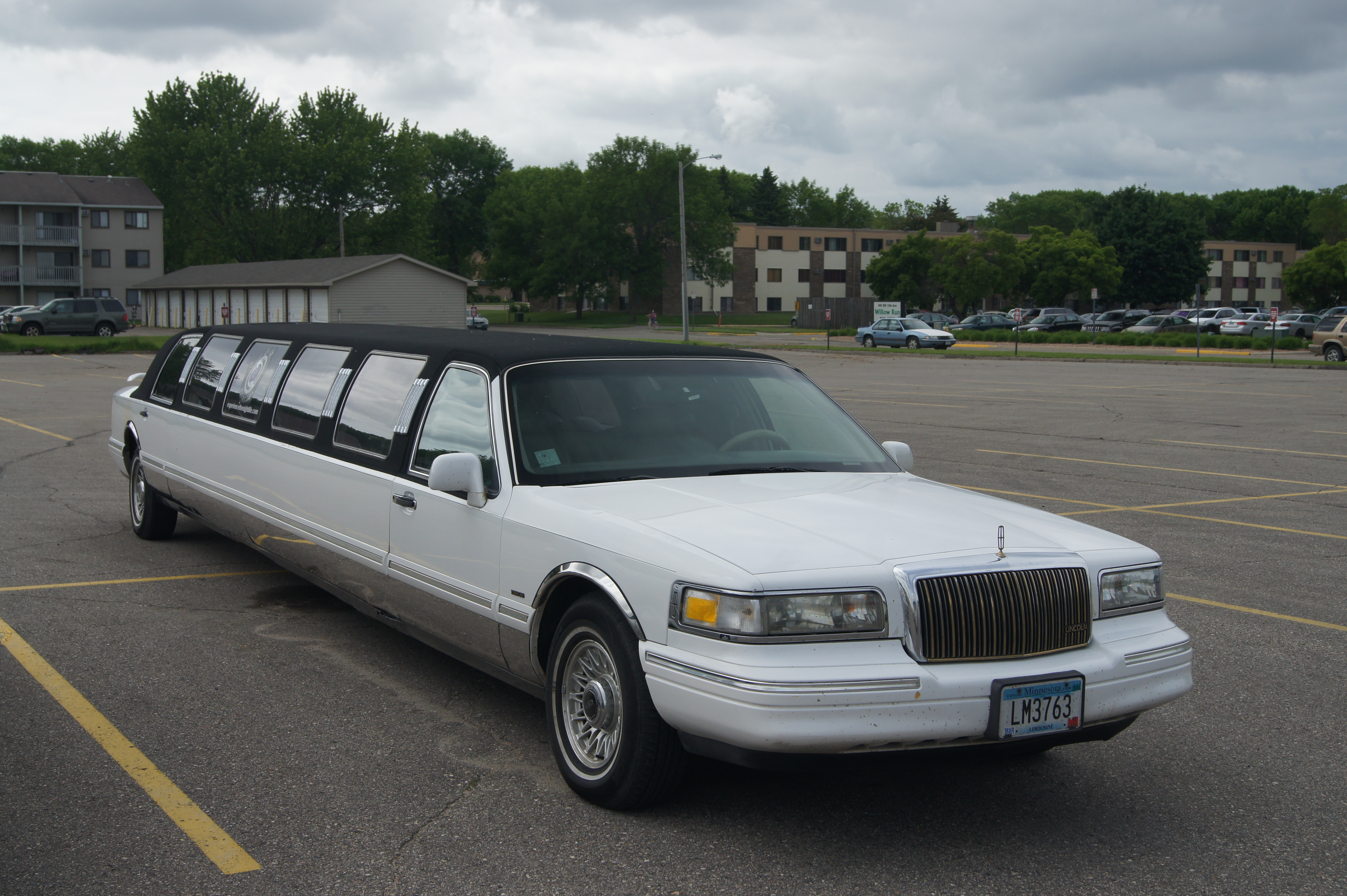
1995–1997 stretch limousine (non-standard; beyond 120 inches)

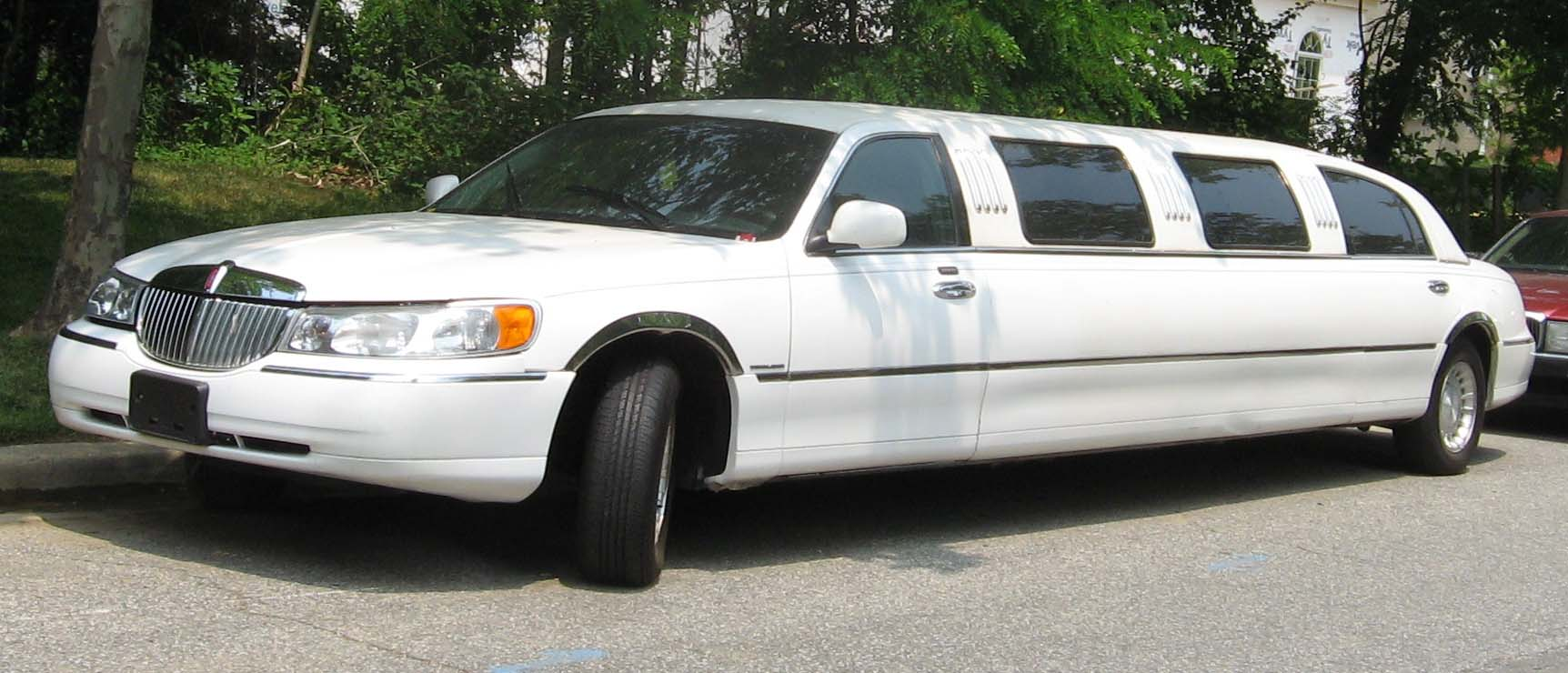
1998–2002 stretch limousine

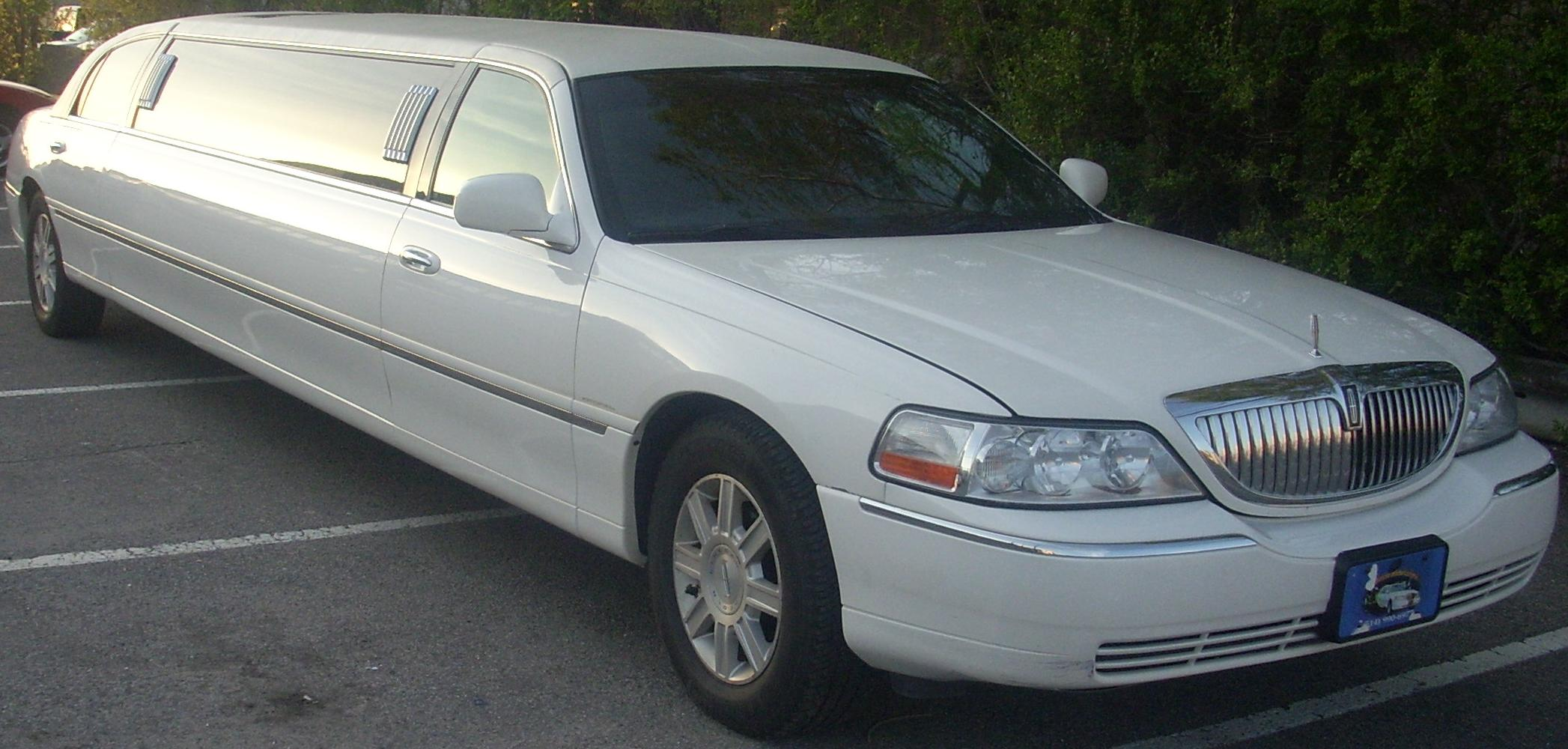
2003–2009 stretch limousine

=== Presidential State Car ===
A 1989 Lincoln Town Car was commissioned by United States President George H. W. Bush as the Presidential State Car of the United States to succeed the 1983 Cadillac Fleetwood used during the Ronald Reagan administration. The Presidential Town Car limousine arrived in 1989 and was the state car for the entire presidency of George H. W. Bush. It was succeeded by a 1993 Cadillac Fleetwood, used by his successor, Bill Clinton. As of 2021, the 1989 Lincoln Town Car is currently the last Lincoln vehicle to have served as a Presidential State Car.

1989 Lincoln Town Car Presidential Limousine

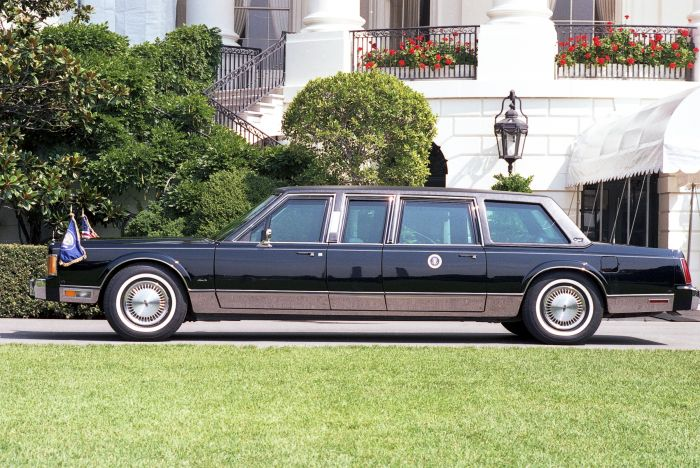
Parked at the White House

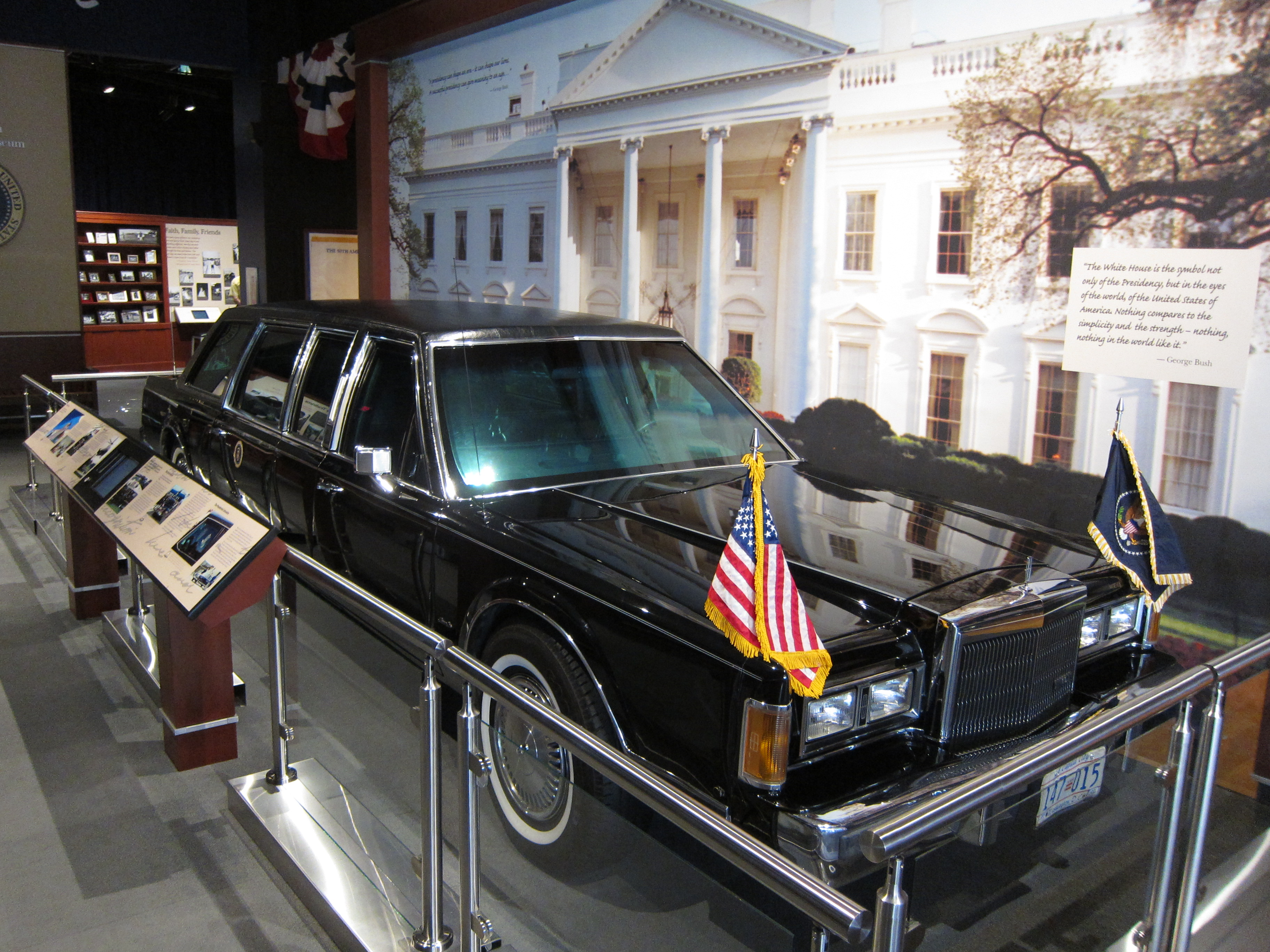
Displayed at George Bush Presidential Library

=== Town Car L ===
A new "L" designation was used for factory extended-wheelbase Town Cars from 2000 to 2011. The L editions offered an additional 6 in (150 mm) of rear-seat legroom, as well as remote access audio and climate controls mounted in the rear center armrest. Also included was a two-way travel switch for the front passenger seat base (a feature shared with the extended-wheelbase Jaguar XJ). The L designation was applied to the top-of-line Cartier (2000–2003), Ultimate (2004 only), and Signature (2005–2011) trim levels. Fleet buyers received it under the Executive L trim designation. Mechanically, Town Car L variants feature several heavy duty components shared with both the fleet-only extended wheelbase Crown Victoria as well as the Crown Victoria Police Interceptor including a heavy-duty front stabilizer bar, heavy duty front struts (2003–2011), a larger battery, as well as a heavy duty cooling system which features an auxiliary transmission and power steering cooler.

For 2000–2002 versions, the "L" edition is identified by a widened B-pillar, bearing the Lincoln "star" ornament; maintaining parts commonality with the standard Town Car. The 2003–2011 "L" editions had longer rear doors, featuring wider versions of the fixed windows.

Lincoln Town Car L (2000–2011)

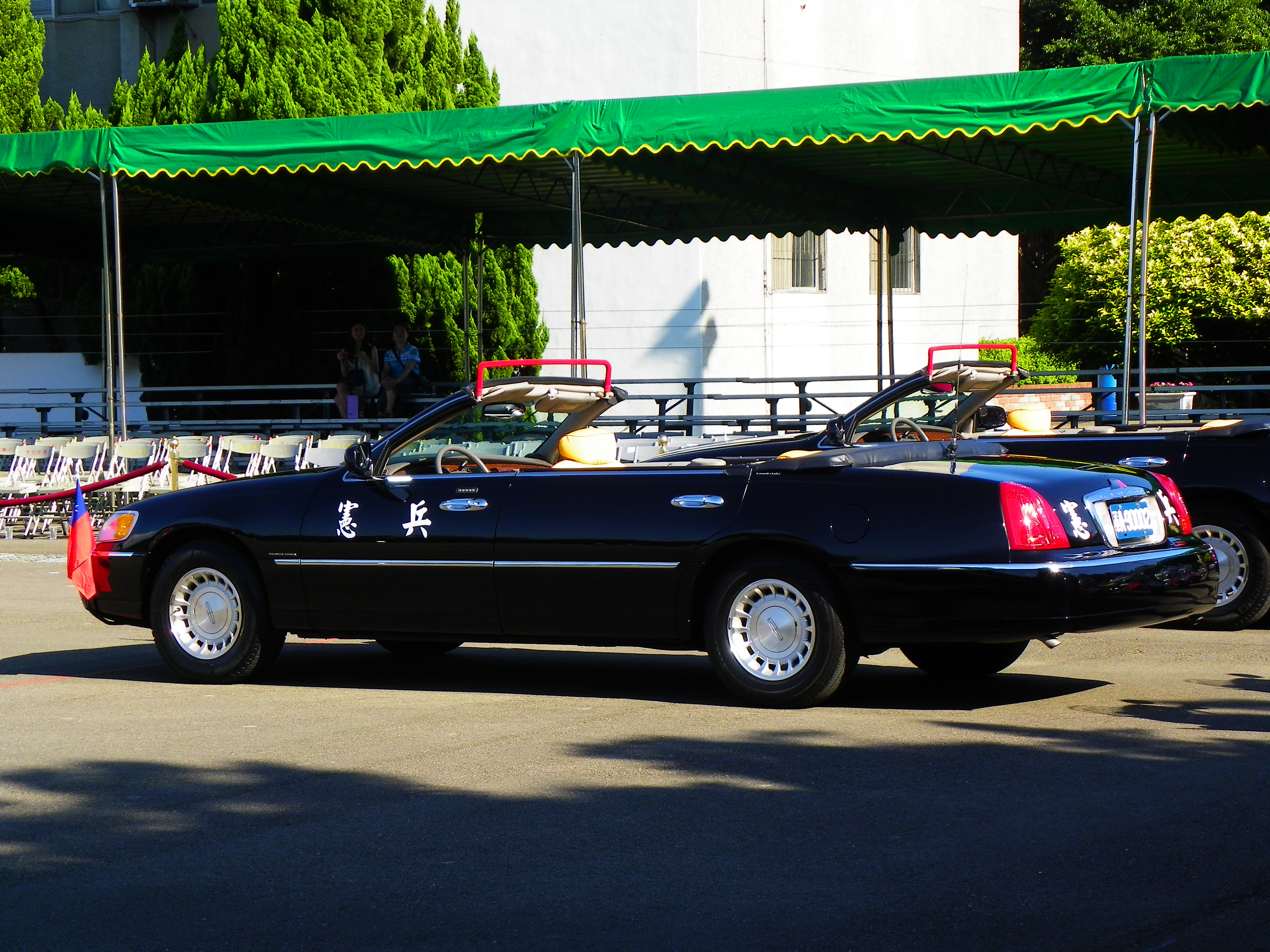
2000–2002 Lincoln Town Car Executive L converted to 4-door convertible in Taiwan (profile showing longer rear doors) used by military police

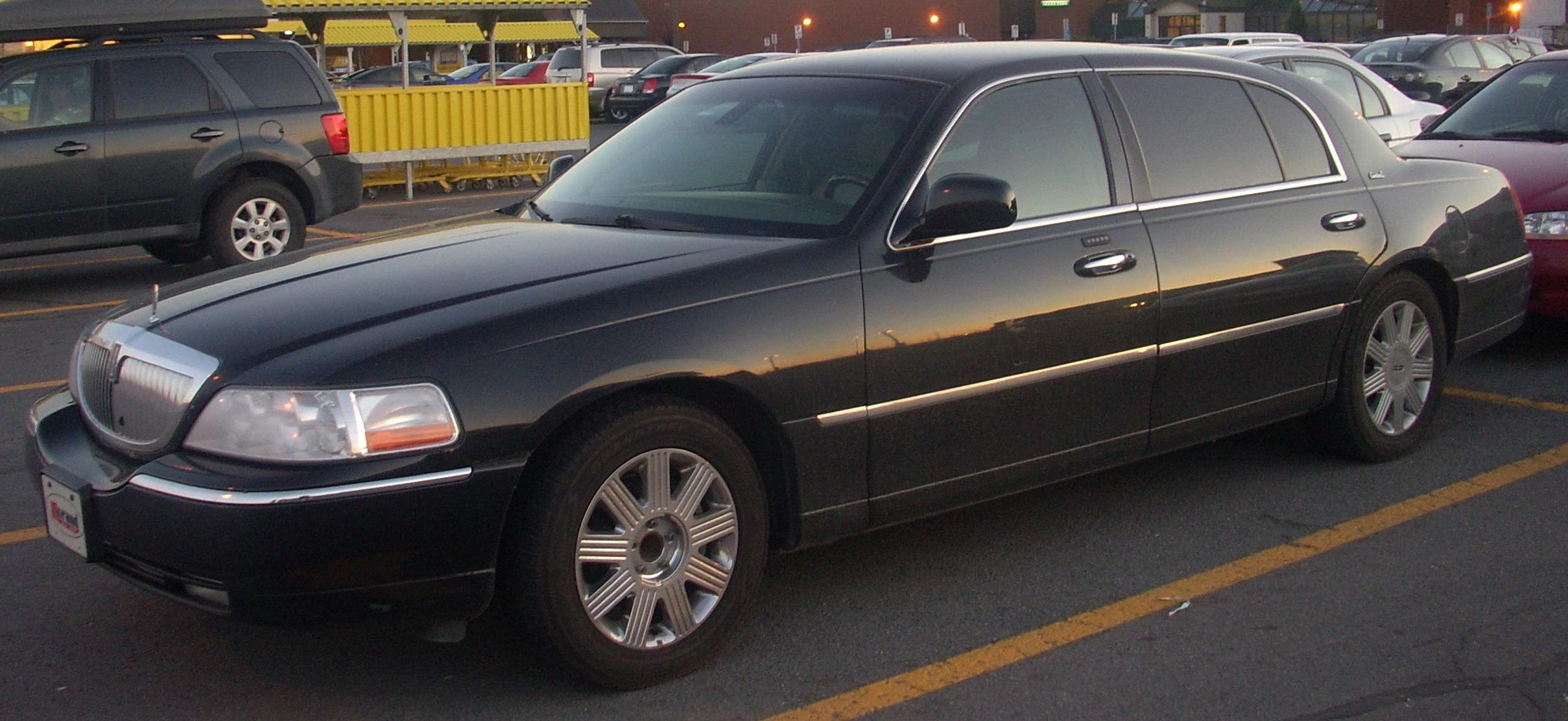
2003 Lincoln Town Car Cartier L

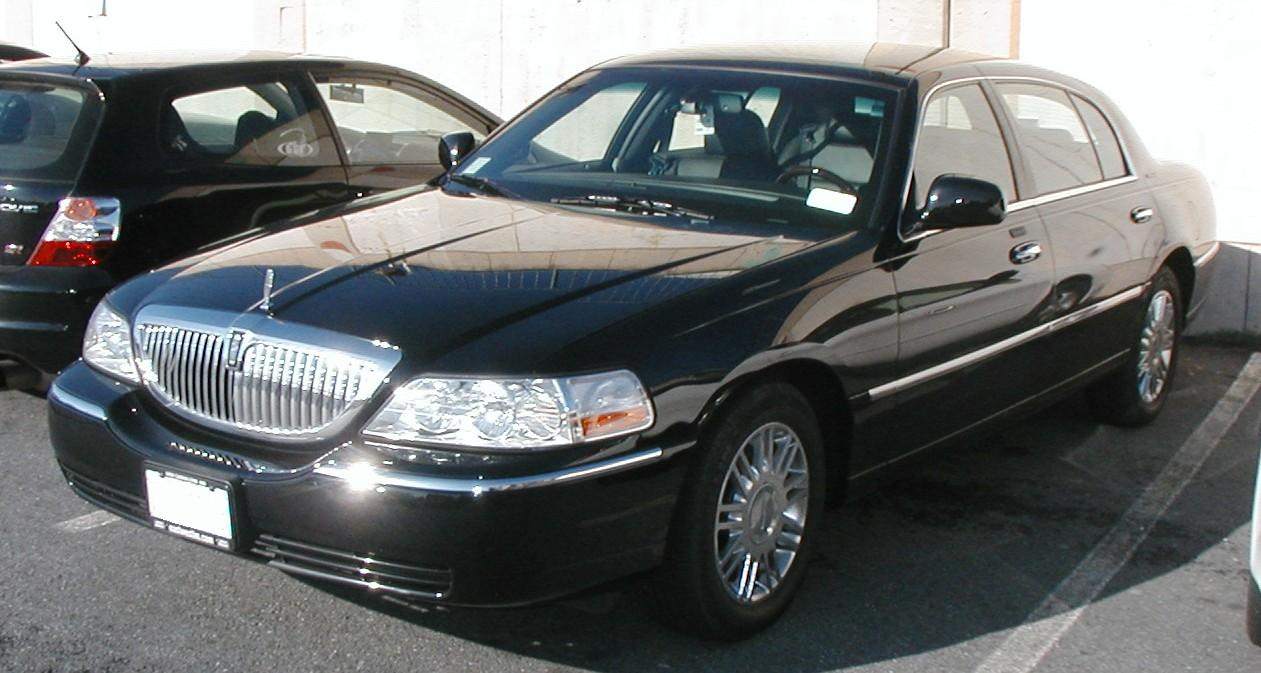
2003–2007 Lincoln Town Car Signature L

=== Ballistic Protection Series ===
Starting in 2003, the Lincoln Town Car had been available featuring ballistic protection from the factory. Adding nearly $100,000 to the base price, the armored body and bulletproof glass increased the curb weight of the Town Car to nearly 7,000 lb (3,175 kg). Other changes included the suspension and brakes. A few dealers in the US were authorized to sell this series.

=== Hongqi CA7460 ===
In China, FAW produced a licensed version of the Lincoln Town Car rebadged as the Hongqi CA7460 (红旗, Red flag CA7460) and Hongqi Qijian (红旗旗舰, Flagship) from November 10, 1998 until 2005. The limousine version is currently called the Hongqi Limousine L1, L2 and L3 respectively. Pricing in 1998 was at 690,000 RMB (US$109,710) while limousines were added to the range. The L3 was introduced in 2001 and had a wheelbase of 3,190 mm (126 in). For 2002, the L1 was introduced and had a wheelbase of 3,990 mm (157 in) and the L2 was introduced in 2003 and had the longest wheelbase out of the three with 5,339 mm (210.2 in). Pricing for the limousine variant was 1,350,000 RMB (US$214,650).

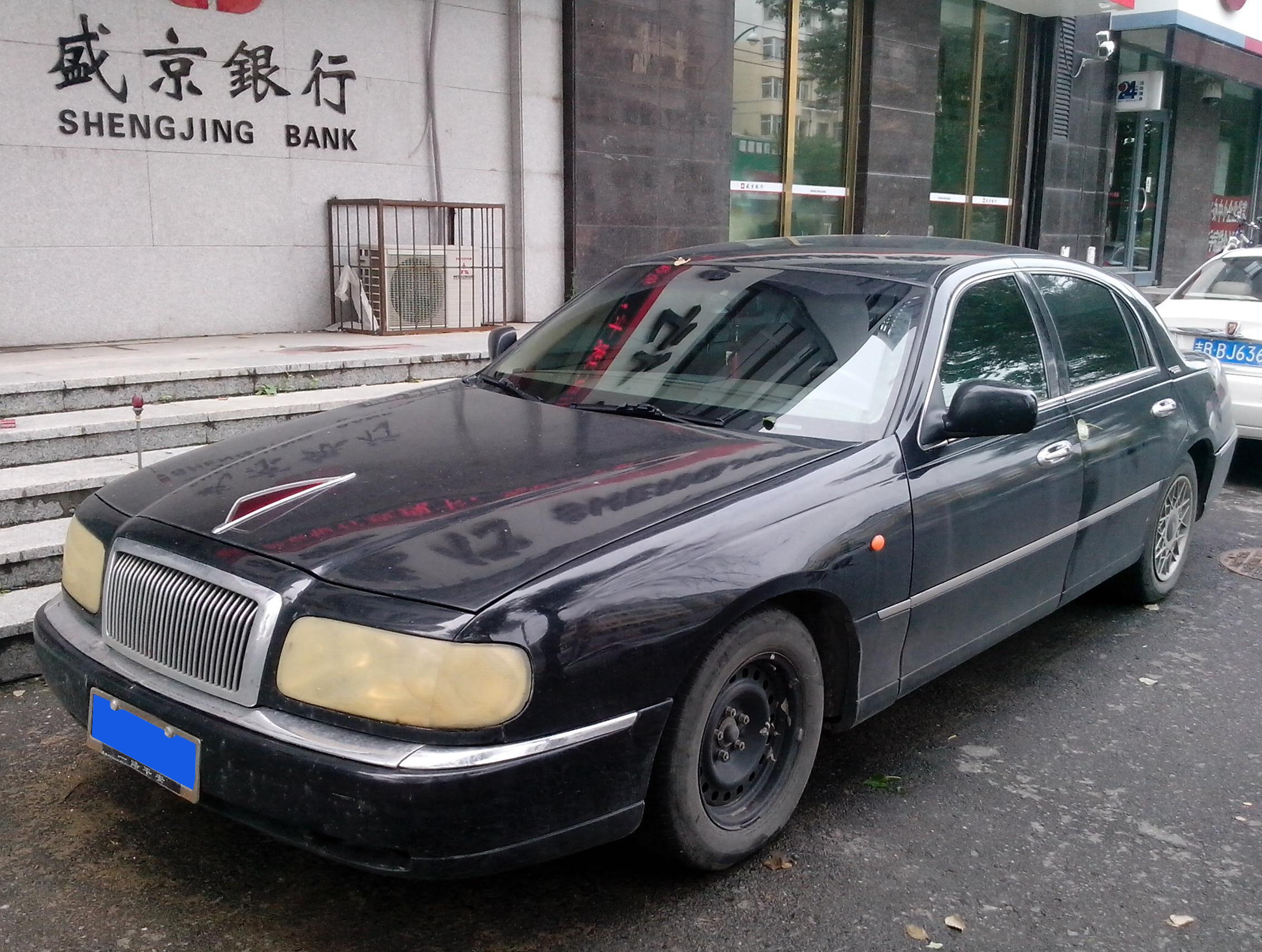
The front is redesigned to follow Hongqi design style; a pair of turn signal lights are added on fenders to meet Chinese standard

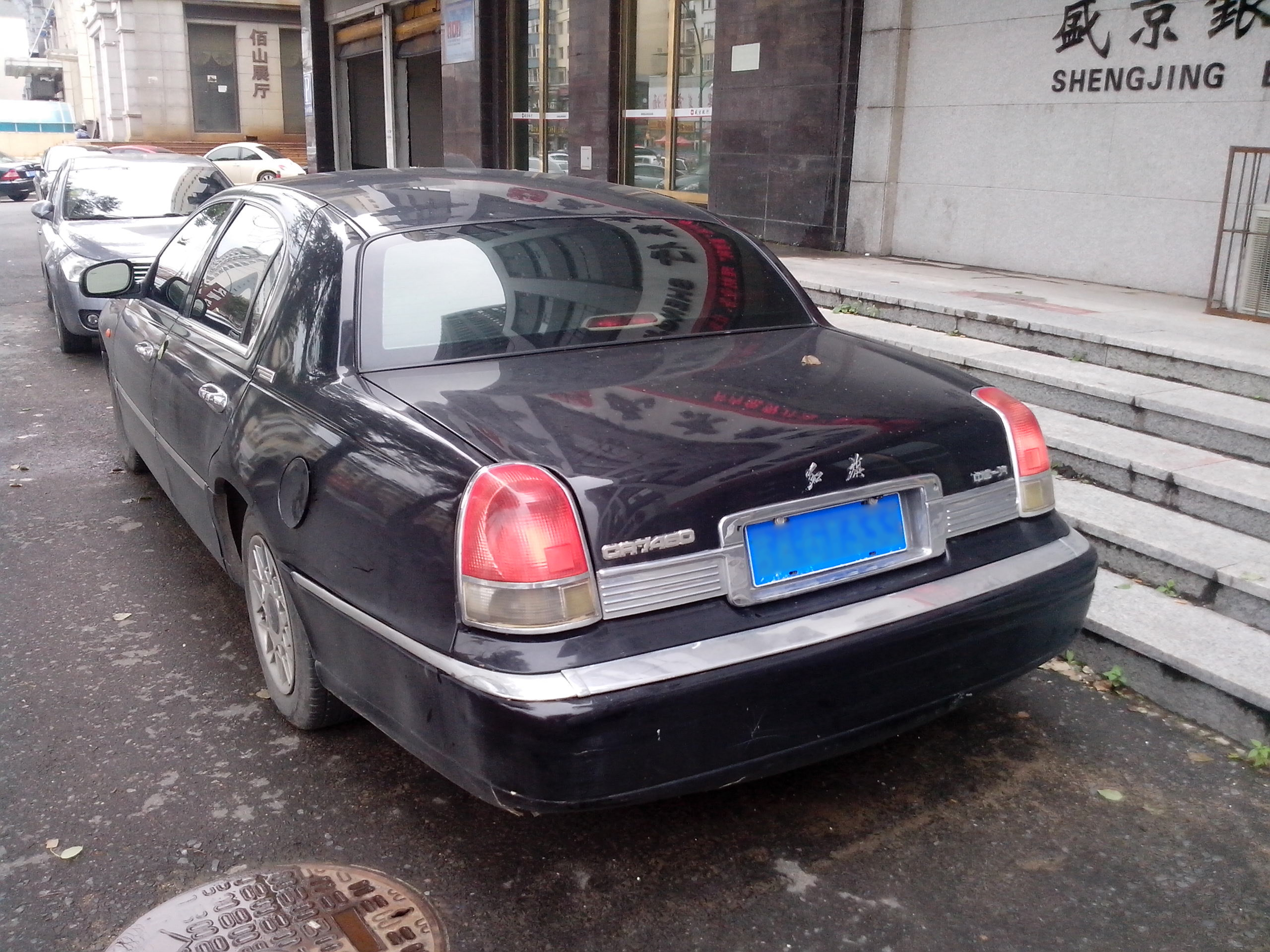
The rear lights set is changed in order to comply with Chinese standard.

== Sales ==
Calendar Year	American sales
1994	120,191
1995	92,673
1996	93,598
1997	92,297
1998	97,547
1999	84,629
2000	81,399
2001	66,859
2002	59,312
2003	56,566
2004	51,908
2005	47,122
2006	39,295
2007	26,739
2008	15,653
2009	11,375
2010	11,264
2011	9,460
2012	1,001
Total	1,058,888

== Discontinuation ==
During the 2000s, in spite of declining sales, the Town Car remained one of the highest-selling American-brand luxury sedans. Outside of retail markets, it was the most used limousine and chauffeured car in the United States and Canada.

In 2006, as part of The Way Forward, Ford considered ending production of Lincoln's largest model as part of the 2007 closing of the Wixom Assembly Plant. Industry observer George Peterson said "It blows everybody’s mind that they are dropping the Town Car. Just think what Ford could do if they actually invested in a re-skin of Crown Victoria, Grand Marquis, and Town Car." Ultimately, Wixom Assembly was closed following the 2007 model year, with the production of the Town Car consolidated with the Ford Crown Victoria, Ford Crown Victoria Police Interceptor, and Mercury Grand Marquis in Canada at St. Thomas Assembly; the first Canadian-produced Town Car was assembled on January 10, 2008.

Following the 2007 model year, however, the Town Car was discontinued for retail sale in Canada, available exclusively for fleet and livery customers afterward. In 2009, the fate of all three Panther-platform models was determined when Ford announced the 2011 closure of the St. Thomas Assembly Plant. For the limousine and livery markets, Ford had promised availability of the Town Car through the 2011 model year; retail sales continued on a limited basis in the United States and for export. In 2010, Ford announced the closure of the Mercury brand at the end of the year, effectively making the Town Car the final model line sold for retail sale produced by St. Thomas Assembly (retail sales of the Crown Victoria ended after 2007).

On August 29, 2011, the final Town Car rolled off the assembly line, without any fanfare or announcement from Ford; St. Thomas Assembly produced its final vehicle (a 2012 Crown Victoria for export) on September 15, 2011.

While Lincoln has not developed a direct successor to the model line following its 2011 discontinuation, the use of the nameplate returned for 2012, denoting a variant of the Lincoln MKT designed for limousine/livery use. The MKT was discontinued after the 2019 model year without a direct replacement, marking the final use of the Town Car name; the nameplate was in use for 49 continuous years by Lincoln (30 as a distinct model line, 11 as a sub-model of the Continental, 8 of the MKT).

== Awards ==
The Town Car has received several awards and recognitions.

- Forbes magazine repeatedly named the Town Car one of the best cars to be chauffeured in along with other, often more expensive flagship sedans, such as the Mercedes-Benz S-Class, BMW 7 Series and Lexus LS. The Town Car Signature L features a rear seat comfort package which not only provides rear seat passengers with audio system and rear compartment climate controls, but also features a control function which allows for the rear seat occupants to move the passenger seat forward, a feature exclusive to few ultra-luxury sedans. In addition to its many amenities, the Signature L also features an unrivaled 46.9 in (1,191 mm) of rear legroom, and 60 in (1,524 mm) of rear shoulder room.
- In 1990, upon the introduction of the second generation Town Car, the vehicle was named Motor Trend Car of the Year. However this award was later included by Car and Driver in a list of the poorly chosen car of the year award winners. Motor Trend has changed the criteria by which it awards its highest accolade: Originally, Car of the Year awards went to the vehicle model which was the most significantly improved over the previous year's design in all respects. Currently, no such consideration is given to contenders for this award, and vehicles are considered for the award even if in their first year of production.

== See also ==
- Ford Crown Victoria/Police Interceptor
- Mercury Grand Marquis/Marauder
- Ford Panther platform
- Lincoln Mark Series
