= Armored car (valuables) =

Specially-designed vehicle used to ensure safe transport of valuables and people

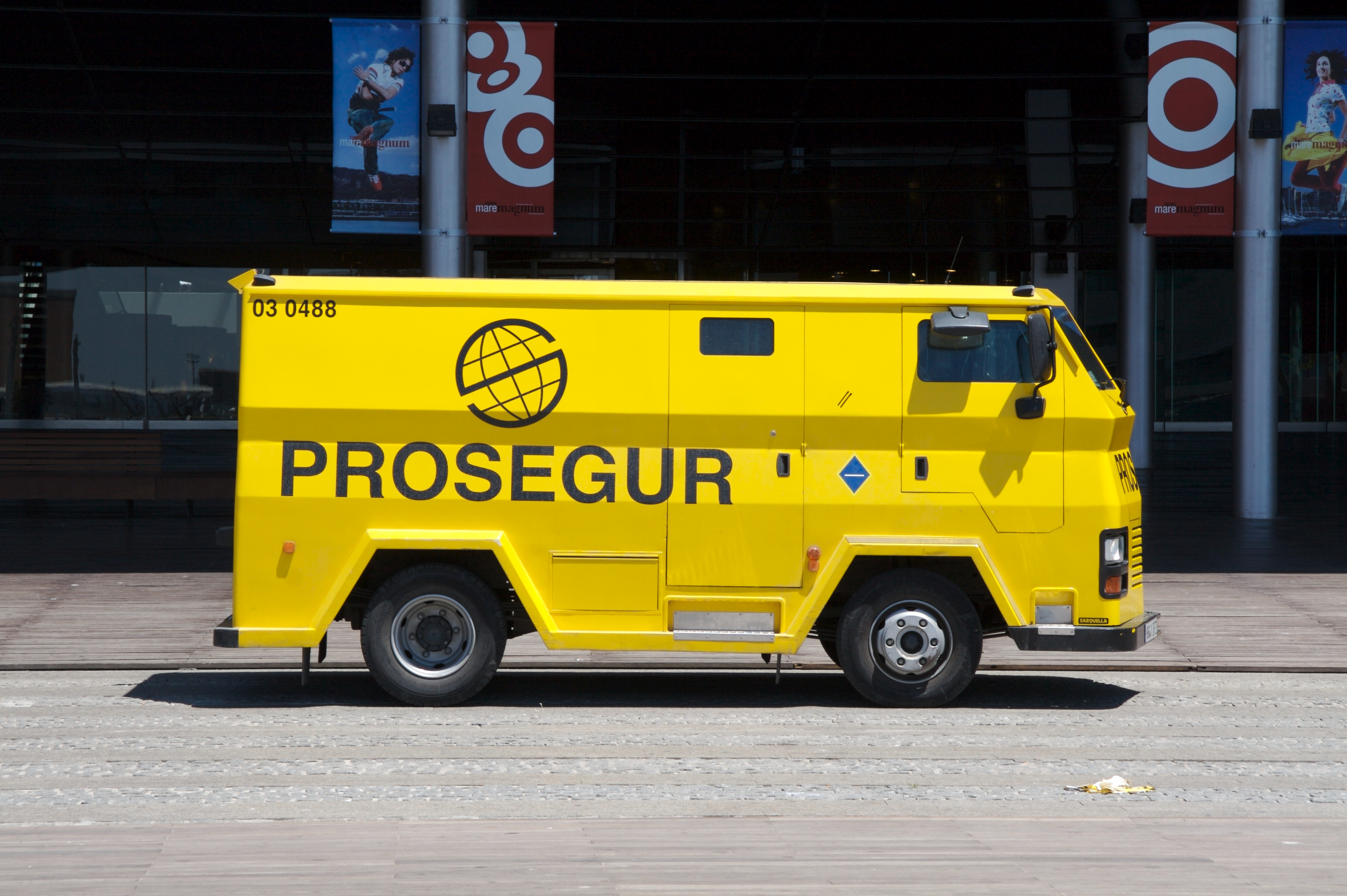
Prosegur armored van in Barcelona

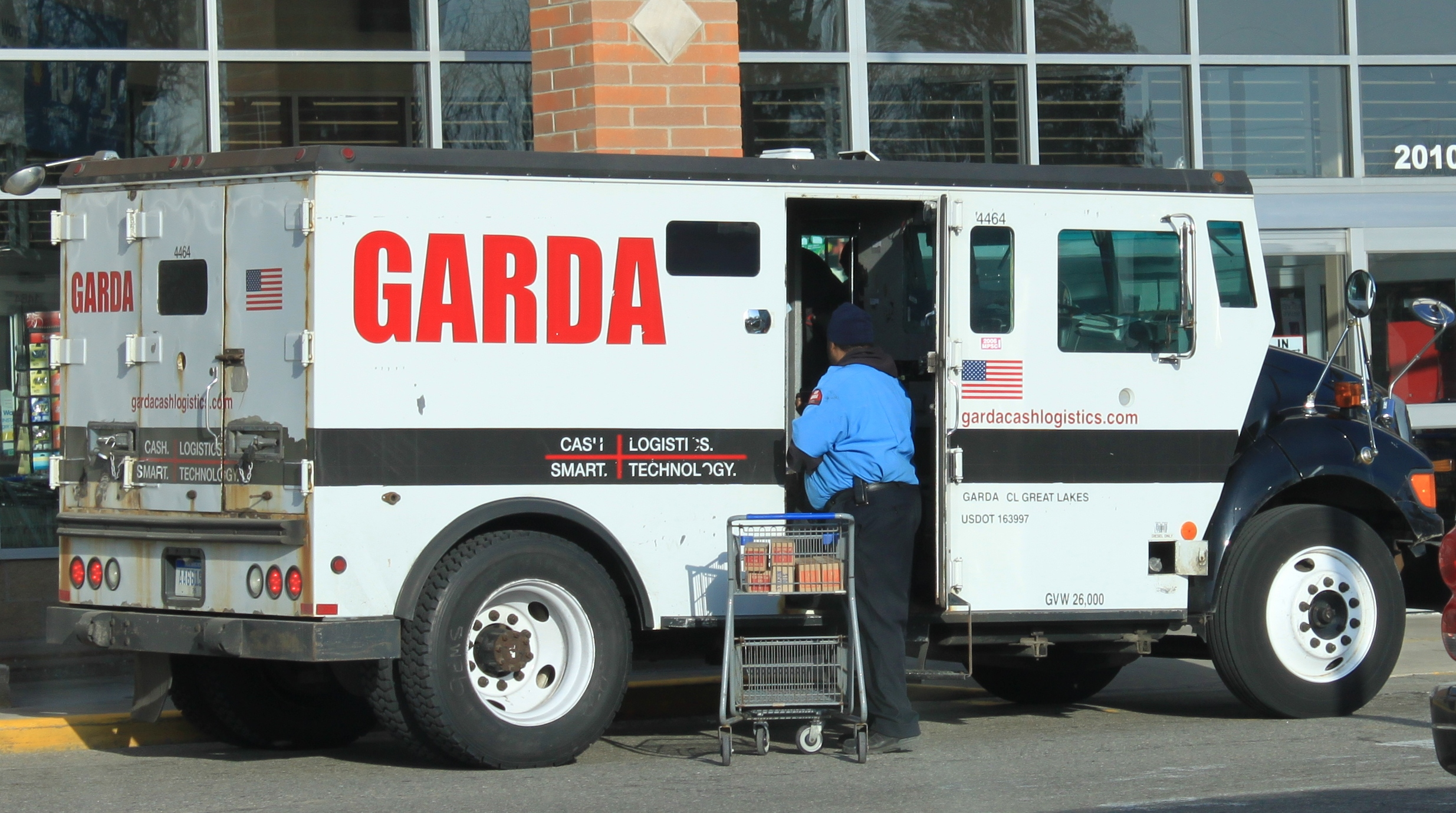
An armored Garda van, in Ypsilanti Township, Michigan

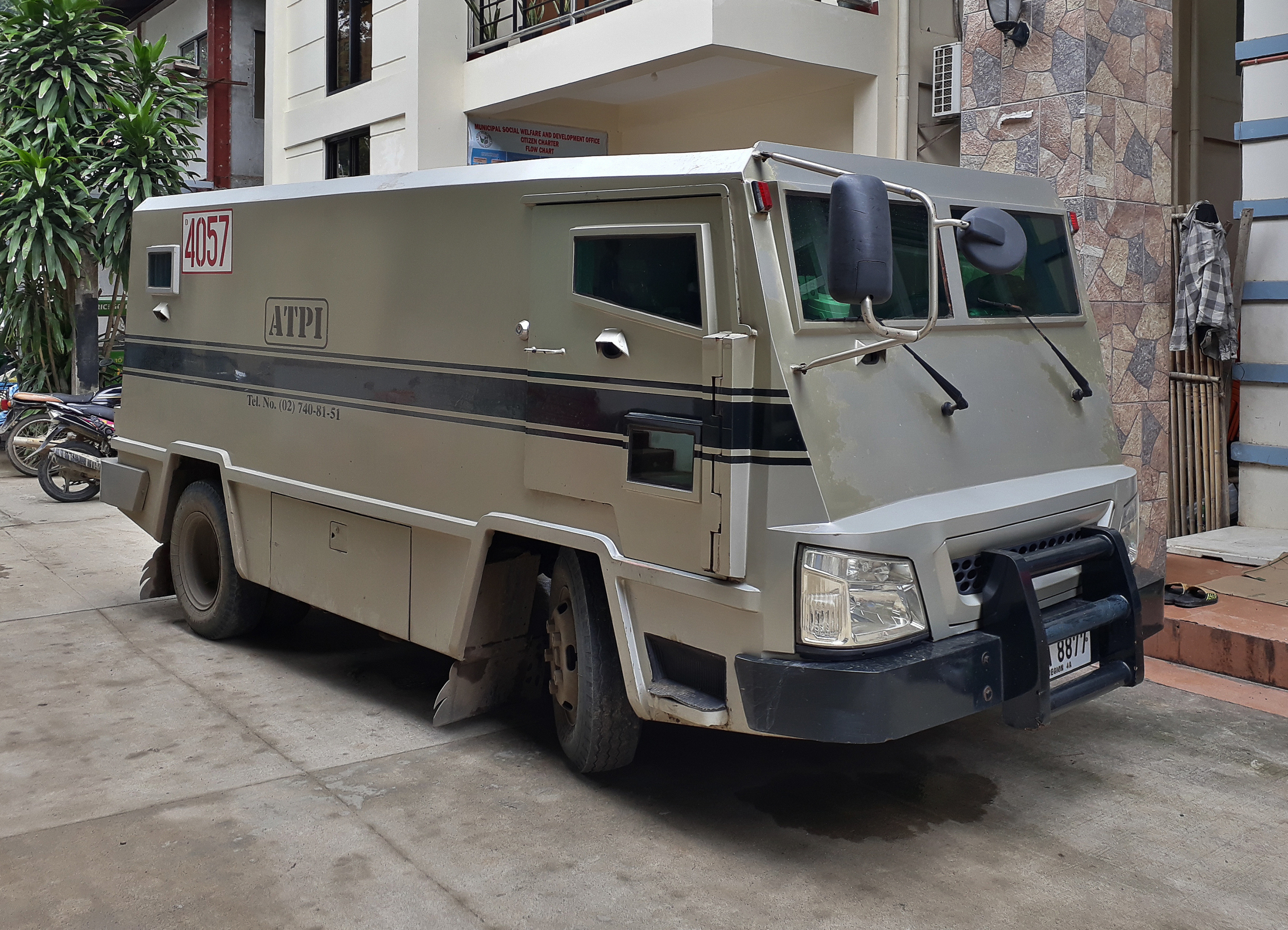
CTK armored van in the Philippines

An armored vehicle (also known as an armored cash transport car, security van, or armored truck) is an armored van or truck used to transport valuables, such as large quantities of money or other valuables, especially for banks or retail companies. The armored car is typically a multifunctional vehicle designed to protect and ensure the wellbeing of the transported contents and guards. Typically customized on a basic van or truck chassis, they feature bullet-resistant glass, armor plating, and reinforced shells and cabs. Armored cars are designed to resist attempts at robbery and hijacking, being able to withstand bullets from most handguns and rifles, as well as extreme degrees of heat, explosives, and collisions.

== History ==
The earliest form of armored transportation for valuables that actually went into production were the "ironclad" treasure wagons designed by the Cheyenne and Black Hills Stage Company during the American Old West. Back then, a platoon of soldiers and cavalrymen were used to transport valuables such as gold safely across the lawless frontier. They were not always successful in escorting their valuables, and some robbers managed to hold up and rob these transports, such as what happened in the Wham Paymaster robbery and the Skeleton Canyon massacres. In Deadwood, the Cheyenne and Black Hills Stage Company suffered robberies along the criminal-infested Deadwood to Cheyenne trail that also resulted in the death of one of their shotgun messengers named Johnny Slaughter. To deter bandits and prevent future robberies, the Stage Company built two steel-plated treasure coaches named Slaughter (after the former shotgun messenger) and Monitor (after the famous USS Monitor in the American Civil War). The stagecoaches had 5/16th-inch thick steel plates, portholes for guards to shoot from, and inside of each coach was a strongbox with walls three inches thick that was bolted to the floor, and was said to be able to resist assaults for 24 hours. Although the stagecoaches were impenetrable, they still left its driver and shotgun messenger unprotected. On September 26, 1878, the Monitor was attacked by the Charles Carey Gang as it left Deadwood. The gang killed one of the passengers, stopped the carriage and took over $27,000 worth of gold and valuables.

Among the first armored cars built was the Bellamore Armored Motor Bank Car, of 1910, which was meant to function like the banking service armored cars of today, but also as a mobile bank branch. It was built on an Autocar Type XXI truck. It was not until Rolls-Royce came out with the Rolls-Royce armoured car in August 1914 that the first armored vehicle was introduced to the British military. The vehicle proved to be superior during the war, creating a demand for armored cars across the globe. In 1930, Mercedes-Benz introduced the Nürburg 460, which was an armored car used to protect the Pope, Pius XI. As the armored car became more and more popular, vehicle manufacturers around the world started creating their own versions.

== Usage ==
=== Financial industry ===
Armored cars are most prominently used in the financial industry to transport currency, financial information, or other valuable assets.

=== Jewelry ===
Many jewelers use armored cars to transport jewelry and materials to their stores, as the valuable nature of such items make them vulnerable to potential robbery attempts.

=== Education ===
Some schools may use armored cars to transport money made by fundraisers or cafeterias. Some universities may have a university bank, and they may require an armored car to handle large amounts of money.

== Vehicles ==
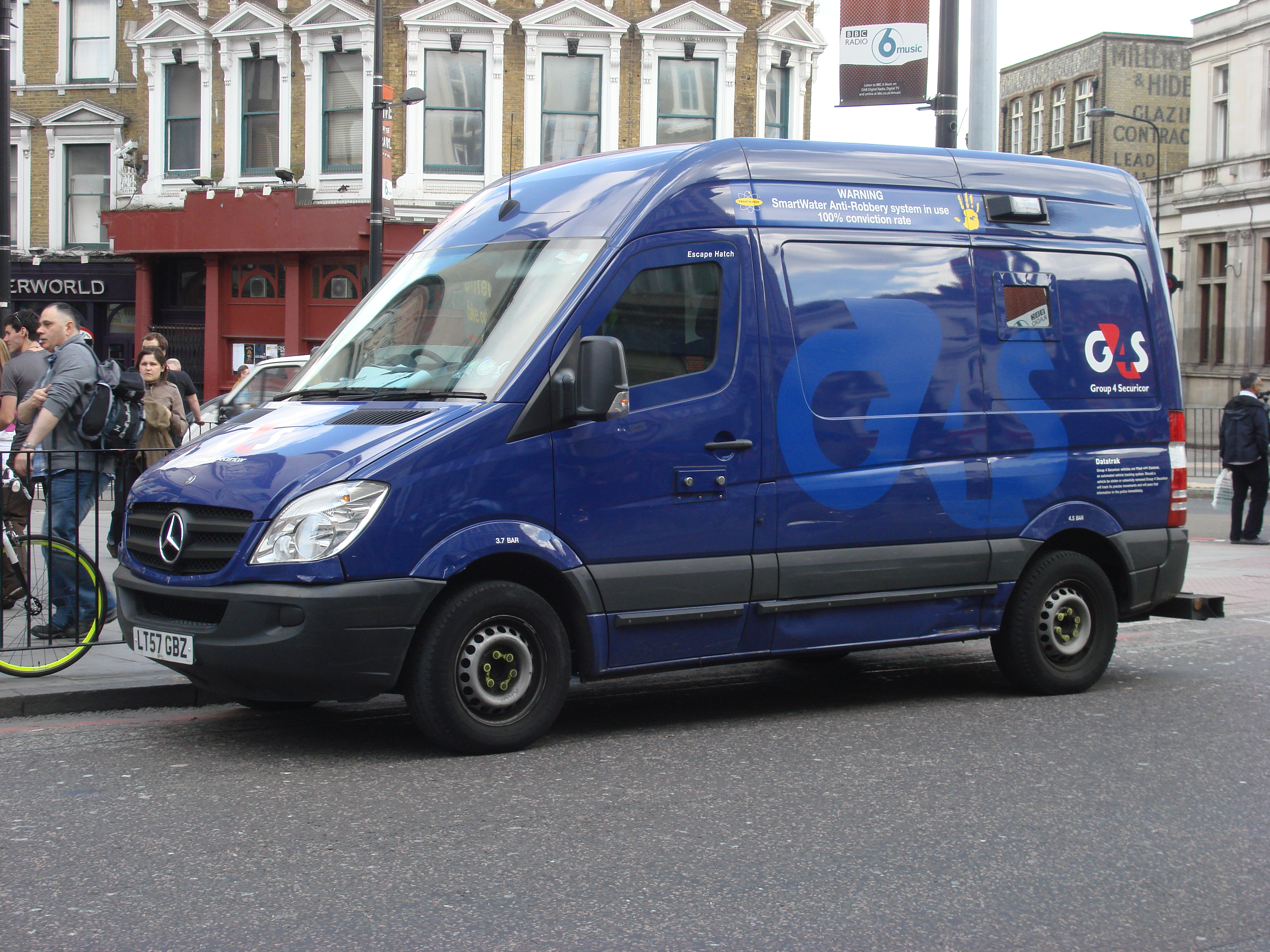
G4S Mercedes-Benz Sprinter security van in the UK

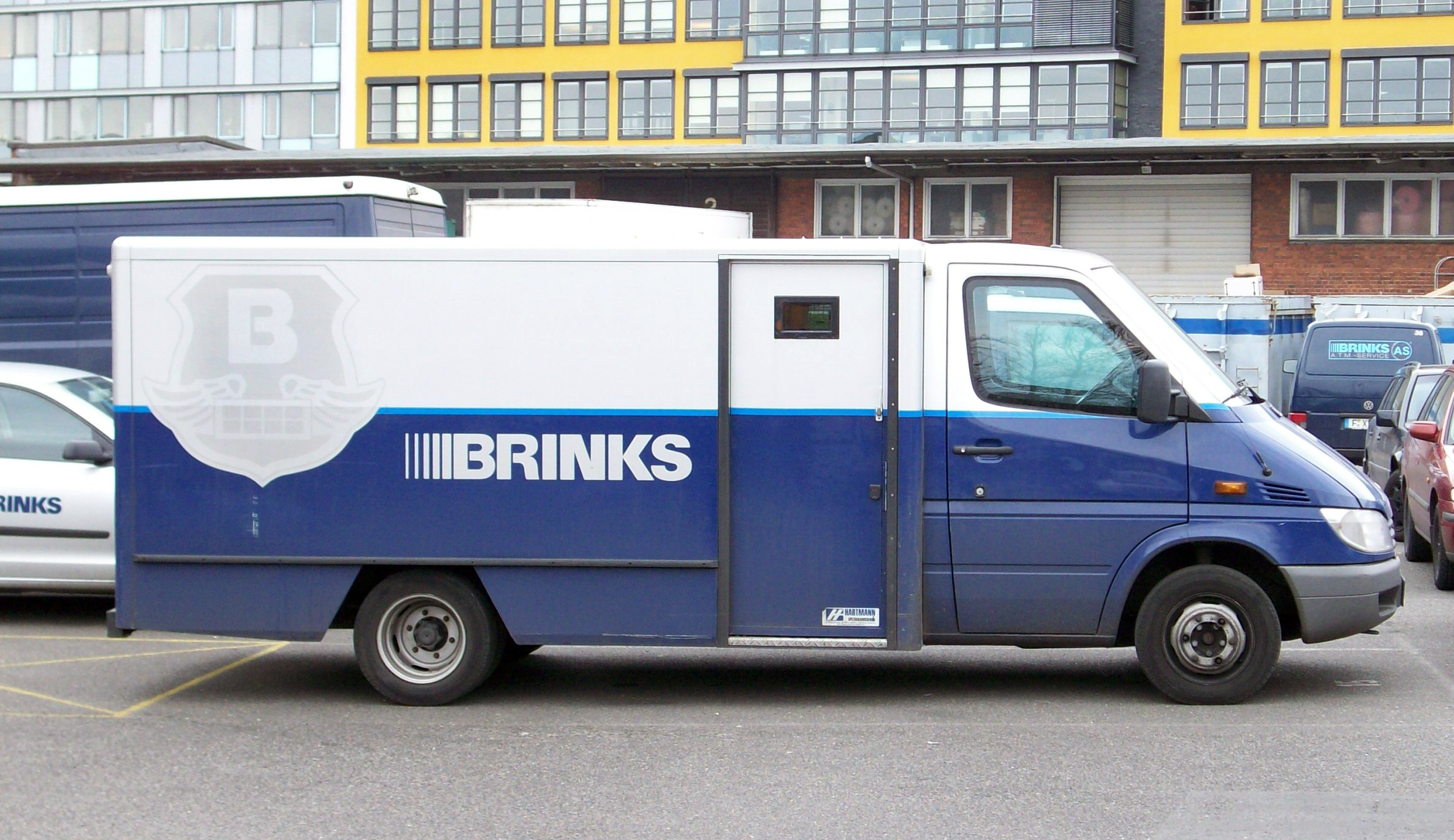
Brinks Mercedes-Benz Sprinter security van in Hamburg, Germany

An armored shell and cab are customized on a basic van or truck chassis. These vehicles are designed to resist attempts at robbery and hijacking. Bullet-resistant glass and reinforced shells and cabs are designed to handle bullets from most handguns and rifles.

=== Construction ===
Production begins with a bare heavy-duty truck chassis, onto which a body frame and armored panels are built up before the interior is outfitted. The walls, floor, ceiling and doors are made from steel in thicknesses from 0.125 in (0.32 cm) to more than 0.25 in (0.64 cm), and the windows from laminated glass between 1.5 in (3.8 cm) and 3 in (7.6 cm) thick. A standard route truck has a gross vehicle weight of around 25,000 lb (11,000 kg), while vehicles built to carry pallets of coin use tandem-axle chassis rated upwards of 55,000 lb (25,000 kg).

Bodies are generally built not by the chassis manufacturer but by specialist armoring firms, among them International Armoring Corporation, INKAS and Alpine Armoring.

=== Traffic safety and security ===
Some armored cars in certain countries may be cleared to have flashing warning lights or sirens. Most armored cars have a bullbar or strengthened bumper to ram through blockades or other road objects if under attack. They normally have CCTV cameras which are watched by the driver, recorded in the van and also recorded at a remotely located control room in case the in-van recordings are stolen by thieves or attackers. With the advent of GPS technology, armored cars are often equipped with tracking devices that can be monitored by the company, letting them see if the vehicle leaves the planned route. GPS can also be used to prevent the rear doors from opening except at designated locations, and can be combined with remote-control systems to disable the engine in the event of theft or hijacking.

=== Access control ===
A number of tools are applied to prevent access to the van by non-security staff including removing external door locks.

The vehicle may or may not be carrying armed guards. Such armored cars are usually operated by security firms, and are therefore often referred to as "security vans".

== Guards ==
Most armored cars have two to three occupants:

- A driver, who is normally never allowed to leave the vehicle until it returns to the garage.
- One or two guards who deliver the valuables, often colloquially known as the "coal bag". Their main duty is to stay watchful, and to load and unload the valuables as fast as possible.

Armored car guards may wear bulletproof vests and sometimes ballistic helmets. Guards may be armed, sometimes with handguns on their person and shotguns or rifles in the vehicle. Armed guards are required to undergo firearms training and may require permits for being a guard or to carry an exposed firearm. Training may also include guidance on remaining calm in emergency situations, such as confronting armed criminals; assisting injured colleagues; notifying local law enforcement; following traffic rules; and choosing the safest routes for transportation.

Five member states of the European Union, namely Denmark, Greece, Ireland, Sweden, and the Netherlands, as well as the United Kingdom, prohibit weapons during cash-in-transit (CIT) operations. In parts of the United States, such as New York State, armored car guards are permitted to carry weapons after reasonable checks. In addition, armored car robberies, like bank robberies, are federal crimes in the United States which will always include the FBI.

== Alternatives ==
Intelligent banknote neutralisation systems are often used as an alternative to armored cars or as a complementary protection for CIT (for example, in semi-armored cars).

== Other uses ==
Despite their primary function as a safe means to transport valuable materials from one place to another, armored cars are occasionally used for other purposes. For example, during the 1997 North Hollywood shootout, LAPD officers commandeered an armored car to extract wounded civilians and officers from the scene towards the end of the shootout. This led to the introduction of specialized armored SWAT vehicles for such situations.

== See also ==
- Armored car (military)
- Armored car (VIP)
- Armoured fighting vehicle
- Armoured personnel carrier
- Non-military armored vehicle
- Safeguards Transporter
- SWAT vehicle
