= Alpine Armoring =

American armored vehicles company

Alpine Armoring Inc.
- Type: Private company
- Industry: Armored vehicle manufacturing Defense industry
- Founded: 1993
- Headquarters: Chantilly, Virginia, United States
- Area served: Worldwide
- Key people: Fred Khoroushi (President/CEO); Dan Diana (General Manager); Cameron Khoroushi (Director of Design Engineering)
- Products: Armored vehicles Tactical vehicles SWAT vehicles
- Services: Custom vehicle armoring Ballistic protection systems
- Website: alpineco.com

Alpine Armoring Inc. is an American supplier and manufacturer of armored vehicles headquartered in Chantilly, Virginia. For over three decades, the company has been specializing in custom-armored vehicles for government agencies, law enforcement, and civilian clients. The company has been featured in the National Geographic Channel series Ultimate Factories and the History Channel series The Works, both in 2008.

== History ==
=== Founding and early years ===
Alpine Armoring initially started its operation in Herndon, Virginia, in 1993 and formally incorporated as Alpine Armoring Inc. in 1997. It initially focused on cash-in-transit (CIT) vans and trucks and custom armored civilian vehicles. The company's proximity to Washington, D.C., enabled it to develop close relationships with United States government agencies and secure early contracts.

In a June 1997 interview on CNNfn with anchor Jody Davis, the company president, Fred Khoroushi, demonstrated an armored 1997 Jeep Grand Cherokee Laredo, rated against all handgun calibers, including 9mm, .357 Magnum, and .44 Magnum, and stated that approximately 90 percent of Alpine Armoring's sales at that time were directed to international clients.

Right after the terrorist attacks of September 11, 2001, Alpine Armoring played an important role in supporting the NY/NJ Port Authority with several armored vehicles.

According to a 2008 National Geographic documentary, there were fewer than 20 licensed armored car manufacturers in the United States at that time, with Alpine Armoring described as "considered one of the best."

=== Expansion into the law enforcement market ===
In 2004, Alpine Armoring entered the SWAT vehicle market with the introduction of the Boxer, based on a lengthened Ford F-550 chassis. This was followed in 2008 by the Bulldog, built on an International Navistar 4700 chassis.

The company's flagship high-level tactical armored vehicle, the Pit-Bull VX SWAT truck, debuted at the International Association of Chiefs of Police (IACP) conference in Chicago in 2011. Built on a Ford F-550 chassis, the vehicle was later reviewed by Car and Driver magazine in 2020.

=== Recent developments ===
The company has expanded its product line to include electric armored vehicles. In September 2025, Alpine Armoring announced the Typhoon, an armored version of the Ford F-150 Lightning which the company described as the first armored electric pickup truck, offering ballistic protection up to CEN level B6+ (marketed by Alpine Armoring as level A9).

Alpine Armoring operates from its headquarters in Chantilly, Virginia, located approximately 40 minutes from Washington, D.C.

== Products and services ==
=== Civilian armored vehicles ===
Alpine Armoring converts a wide range of civilian vehicles, including luxury models such as the Mercedes-Benz S-Class and G-Class, Lexus LX570, Cadillac Escalade, and Chevrolet Suburban. The company offers 12 levels of ballistic protection, rated on Alpine Armoring's internal scale from A1 (CEN B1) to A12 (B7+), which correspond to various international standards, including CEN 1063, NATO STANAG 4671, NIJ, and Underwriters Laboratory specifications.

Khoroushi noted in 1997 that armoring exotic vehicles such as Ferrari or Lamborghini was rare, as the added weight of armor significantly compromised performance, a trade-off typically unacceptable to that class of buyer. Occasional conversions had been performed on vehicles such as the Jaguar XK8.

Popular platforms for armoring include vehicles with high Gross Vehicle Weight Ratings (GVWR), such as the Mercedes S-Class and G-Class, Toyota Land Cruiser, and full-size SUVs from General Motors, including Chevrolet and GMC models. According to Cameron Khoroushi, Alpine Armoring's Director of Design Engineering, manufacturers like Toyota, Mercedes, and General Motors "tend to over-engineer their vehicles," making them better suited for the additional weight of armor. Alpine Armoring also installs heavy-duty suspension replacements and upgrades to properly support increased weight and maintain safe handling and ride quality after armoring.

Build times typically range from four to six weeks for standard conversions, with eight to twelve weeks required for new vehicle types and makes not previously armored by the company.

==== Mastiff ====
The Mastiff is a limited-production armored pickup truck based on the Ford Super Duty platform. It is offered at Alpine Armoring's highest protection tier, Level A12 (CEN B7+), which the company describes as the first commercially offered civilian armored vehicle capable of stopping .50 caliber BMG rounds, as well as other high-power rifle rounds including .30-06, 7.62×51 AP, 5.56×45 AP, and 7.62×39 AP. Armor components include certified lightweight ballistic steel, ballistic composite material, and bullet-resistant glass.

Powered by a turbocharged 6.7-liter Power Stroke V8 diesel engine mated to a 10-speed automatic transmission, the armored vehicle weighs approximately 11,890 pounds. Security features include an anti-sabotage exhaust protection system, an armored ECM, an armored fuel tank, undercarriage floor protection, run-flat tire inserts, strobe lights, a PA system, a siren, and a night vision camera. The interior features heated and ventilated leather seats, an Alcantara steering wheel, and a custom high-end infotainment system. Production is limited to 21 units worldwide.

=== Law enforcement and tactical vehicles ===
==== Pit-Bull series ====
The Pit-Bull model with earlier sub models (XL etc.) with seating configuration of up to 14 crew and the most recent and modern versions (VX and VXT) are Alpine Armoring's primary SWAT and armored personnel carrier (APC) vehicle. Built on a Ford F-600 chassis with a 6.7-liter Power Stroke diesel V8 engine producing 330 horsepower and 750 pound-feet of torque, the vehicle weighs approximately 19,750 pounds and can accommodate up to 10 crew members. The VX model features armor rated to stop .50 BMG rounds and withstand grenades or up to 20 kilograms of TNT. It includes a hydraulic battering ram, seven gun ports, and a 360-degree rotating turret with a flip-up roof shield.

The Pit-Bull VXT, resembling a pickup truck that was introduced in 2024, offers both law enforcement and civilian configurations. Built on a Ford F-600 4x4 chassis, it provides ballistic protection from CEN levels B6+ to B7+ (Alpine level A12). The law enforcement version features rear-facing jump seats with gun ports, while the civilian version offers forward-facing bench seating and a friendlier interior suited for non-tactical customers.

==== Operators ====
The Pit-Bull FX, the name under which Alpine Armoring marketed in the United States from 2008, was supplied to police and gendarmerie units outside the country. Two vehicles were delivered in 2010 to Portugal's Polícia de Segurança Pública for its counter-terrorism Grupo de Operações Especiais; four went to the Rapid Response Squad of Lagos State, Nigeria, in 2011; and further vehicles were allocated to Tunisia's Unité Spéciale de la Garde Nationale and Brigade Nationale d'Intervention Rapide. The model was discontinued around 2014, superseded by the Pit-Bull VX.

==== Other tactical vehicles ====
The Condor, unveiled in 2025, is a luxury tactical SUV based on the Ford F-600 Heavy Duty truck. It features CEN B6+ protection and can seat up to six passengers in a 2+2+2 configuration with numerous luxury interior seating and features for the passengers. The vehicle weighs around 19,200 pounds and includes captain chairs with many features such as dual panoramic sunroofs, ambient lighting, high-end leather and Alcantara trim, and wood laminate flooring.

The Condor-T is a pickup truck version of the Condor with an external cargo bed for carrying equipment. Like the Condor, it is built on a four-wheel-drive Ford F-600 chassis, with a 6.7-liter Power Stroke V8 turbodiesel rated at 330 hp (250 kW) and a six-speed automatic transmission. It rides on 20-inch wheels with run-flat inserts and is offered at Alpine Armoring's A9 to A12 protection levels; the company rates A9 against 7.62×51mm M80 ball rounds and A12 against .50 BMG ball rounds.

=== Technical specifications ===
==== Armor materials and construction ====
Alpine Armoring uses a combination of opaque and transparent armor materials. Opaque armor typically consists of light and certified ballistic steels, Kevlar, Dyneema, and various polyurethane and composites, including ceramics, aluminum carbide, boron carbide, and silicon carbide as deemed needed. Transparent armor comprises multiple layers of polycarbonate, and glass, with thickness ranging from three-quarters of an inch (40 mm) to more than three inches (75 mm), depending on the protection level required. The manufacturing process of soft skin type vehicles involves completely stripping a vehicle to bare metal, integrating armor materials with attention to maintaining a low center of gravity, and reassembling the vehicle with specialized components. A typical conversion at Alpine Armoring's Level A9 adds approximately 1,800 to 3,000 pounds to the weight of an average-sized SUV or sedan.

==== Protection levels ====
Alpine Armoring's vehicle armor rating system ranges from A1 to A12. Level A9, the most commonly manufactured level of its vehicles, provides protection against high-power rifle rounds, including 7.62×39mm (AK-47), 5.56×45mm (AR-15), and 7.62×51mm (M80). Level A12, broadly described as equivalent to "the presidential limousine" protection level, can withstand armor-piercing rounds.

All Alpine Armoring armor materials are typically tested internally and, when incorporated into vehicles, always certified by third-party agencies, including the United States Army's Aberdeen Proving Ground and the Munich Ballistics Agency.

==== Optional features ====
Standard security features include run-flat tire inserts allowing continued operation for at least 50 miles after tire failure, upgraded heavy-duty suspension systems, reinforced doors and hinges, and enhanced braking systems.

Khoroushi noted in 1997 that standard run-flat devices allowed continued operation at up to 35 miles per hour for 30 to 50 miles after tire failure, while a higher-performance pursuit variant permitted speeds of 60 to 70 miles per hour, albeit with accelerated wear at higher speeds. All four tires, including the spare, were typically fitted with run-flat inserts.

Optional equipment includes environmental water-based smoke screen systems, night vision cameras, 360-degree monitoring systems, multi-siren public address systems, satellite phones, fire suppression systems, oxygen overpressure systems for chemical/biological threat protection, and secure weapon storage.

In a 1997 demonstration, Khoroushi highlighted a smoke screen and tear gas deployment system he referred to as a "James Bond box," activated by a dashboard button to deter pursuing vehicles. Other optional accessories demonstrated during the segment included oil slick dispensers, road nail deployment systems, and a door-mounted electric shock deterrent delivering approximately 12 to 15 volts, sufficient to discourage unauthorized entry without causing serious injury. Personal protective accessories such as ballistic helmets, face shields, and body armor were also offered, with entry-level items priced at a few hundred dollars.

== Clients and contracts ==
=== United States government ===
According to USAspending.gov, Alpine Armoring has been awarded many multimillion-dollar federal contracts across 179 transactions, including several via its GSA contract. Company president Fred Khoroushi stated in a 2025 interview that approximately half of Alpine Armoring's business comes from U.S. government contracts, with the remainder divided between law enforcement agencies and private clients, including corporate executives, embassies, and high-profile individuals.

=== International sales ===
As early as 1997, approximately 90 percent of Alpine Armoring's sales were directed to international clients. Fred Khoroushi cited growing instability in post-Soviet republics, Eastern Europe, South America, and the Philippines as key drivers of demand among executives and government officials. According to the company, this percentage in the United States market has been rapidly declining in recent years due to heightened security risks in the US.

== Leadership ==
Fred Khoroushi serves as founder and CEO of Alpine Armoring. Dan Diana serves as General Manager and has represented the company in interviews with automotive media and as the primary point of contact on government procurement contracts.

== Media coverage ==
Alpine Armoring was featured in Season 2, Episode 7 of the National Geographic Channel's Ultimate Factories series in 2008, titled "Armoured Cars." The episode documented the company's manufacturing process and armoring technology.

Alpine Armoring was also featured in the History Channel series The Works, Season 1, Episode 2 ("Steel"), which aired on July 17, 2008. The segment included a live ballistic demonstration of a 12-ton Alpine Armoring SWAT vehicle rated A10 (CEN B7), capable of speeds up to 80 to 90 miles per hour, with the program's host inside the vehicle during the test, conducted at the company's Dallas facility.

The company has received coverage in several automotive publications, including Car and Driver, MotorTrend, and AutoEvolution, as well as industry publications such as Police Magazine, Sovereign Magazine, and Military.Africa. In October 2026, motoring journalist Cesare Gasparri Zezza reviewed the Condor-T for the Italian daily Il Giornale and the motoring website Autoappassionati.it, describing it as an armored pickup that "brings together the look of a tactical vehicle and the cabin of a limousine" and noting that its weight called for braking early.

Alpine Armoring regularly exhibits at different industry-rated security shows in the United States and around the world, including at the International Association of Chiefs of Police (IACP) annual conference, including exhibitions in 2011, 2025, and other years.

== See also ==
- Armored car (VIP)
- Vehicle armour
