= Armored car (VIP) =

Civilian vehicle modified with armor to protect occupants

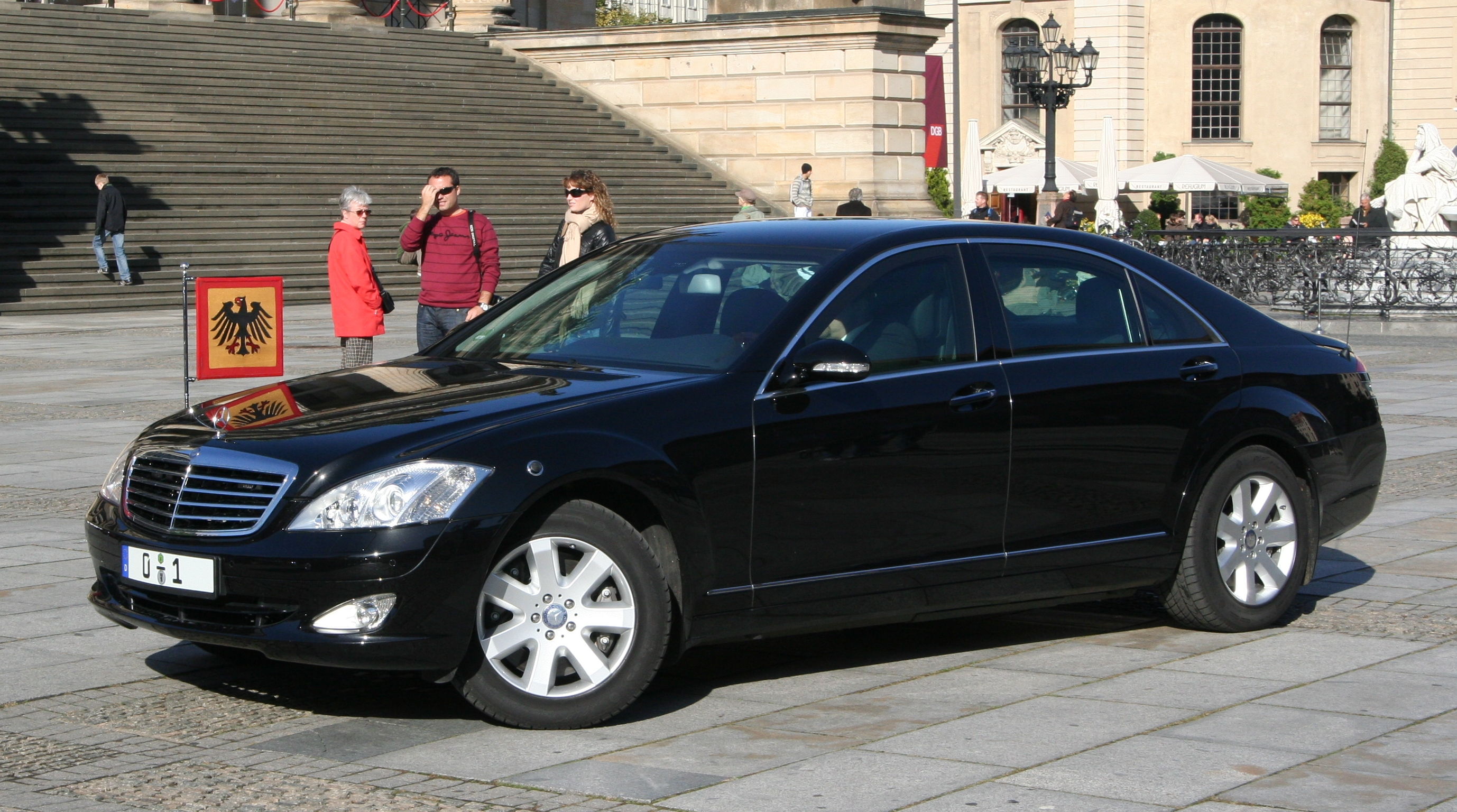
An armored Mercedes-Benz W221 used by the President of Germany

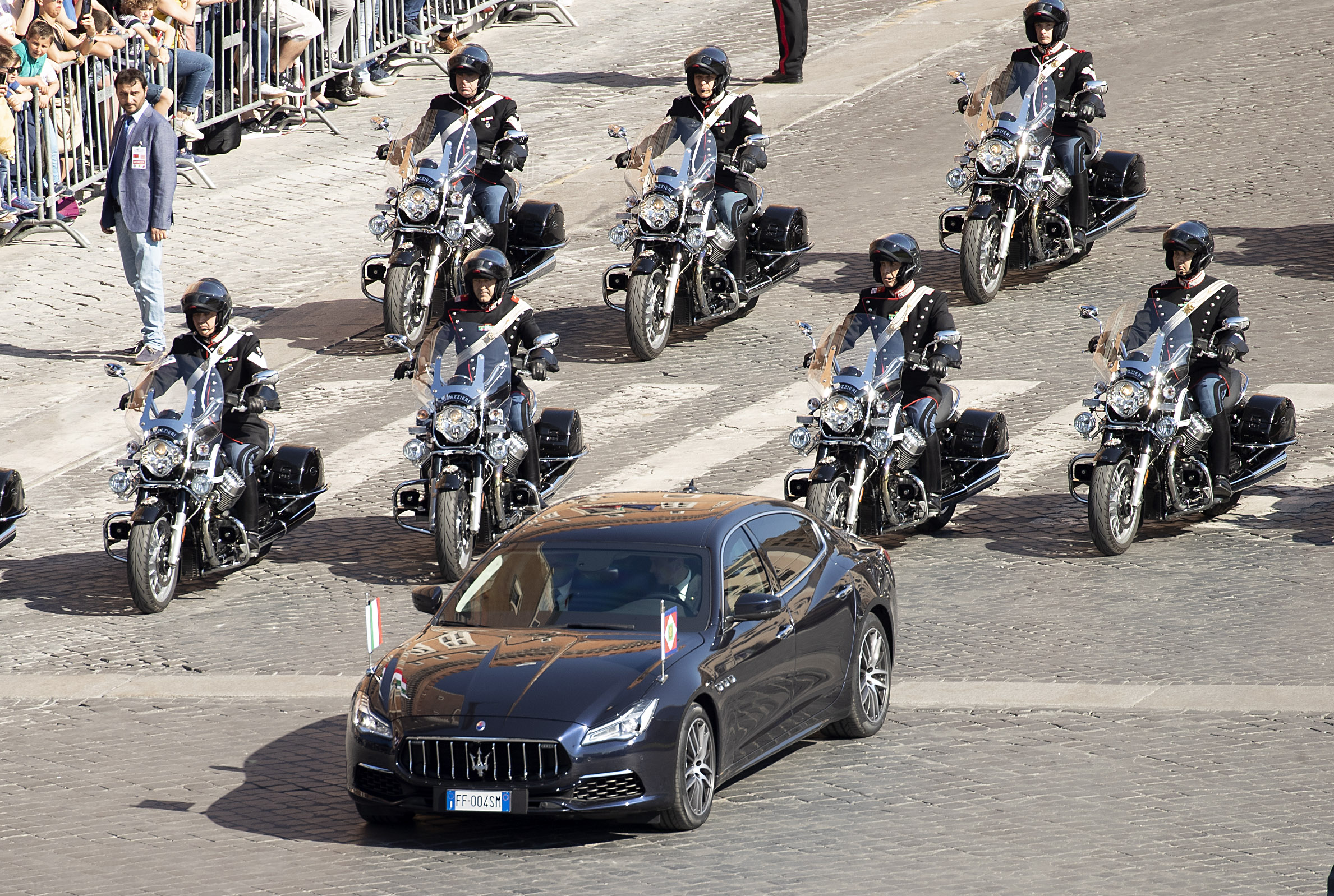
An armored Maserati Quattroporte VI used by the President of Italy

A VIP armored car is a civilian vehicle with a reinforced structure that is designed to protect its occupants from assaults, bullets and blasts. Armored cars are typically manufactured with bulletproof glass and layers of armor plating, often with a variety of other defensive mechanisms and features to aid the individuals inside. Unlike military armored vehicles, a civilian armored car is designed to be inconspicuous and visually similar to its factory version.

Armored cars are used internationally and often used to protect high-profile individuals such as heads of state, political figures, businesspersons, VIPs, and sometimes celebrities. They may also be used by governmental law enforcement agencies as well as private military contractors. Chicago mobster Al Capone reportedly owned an armored 1928 Cadillac 341A.

== Base vehicles ==
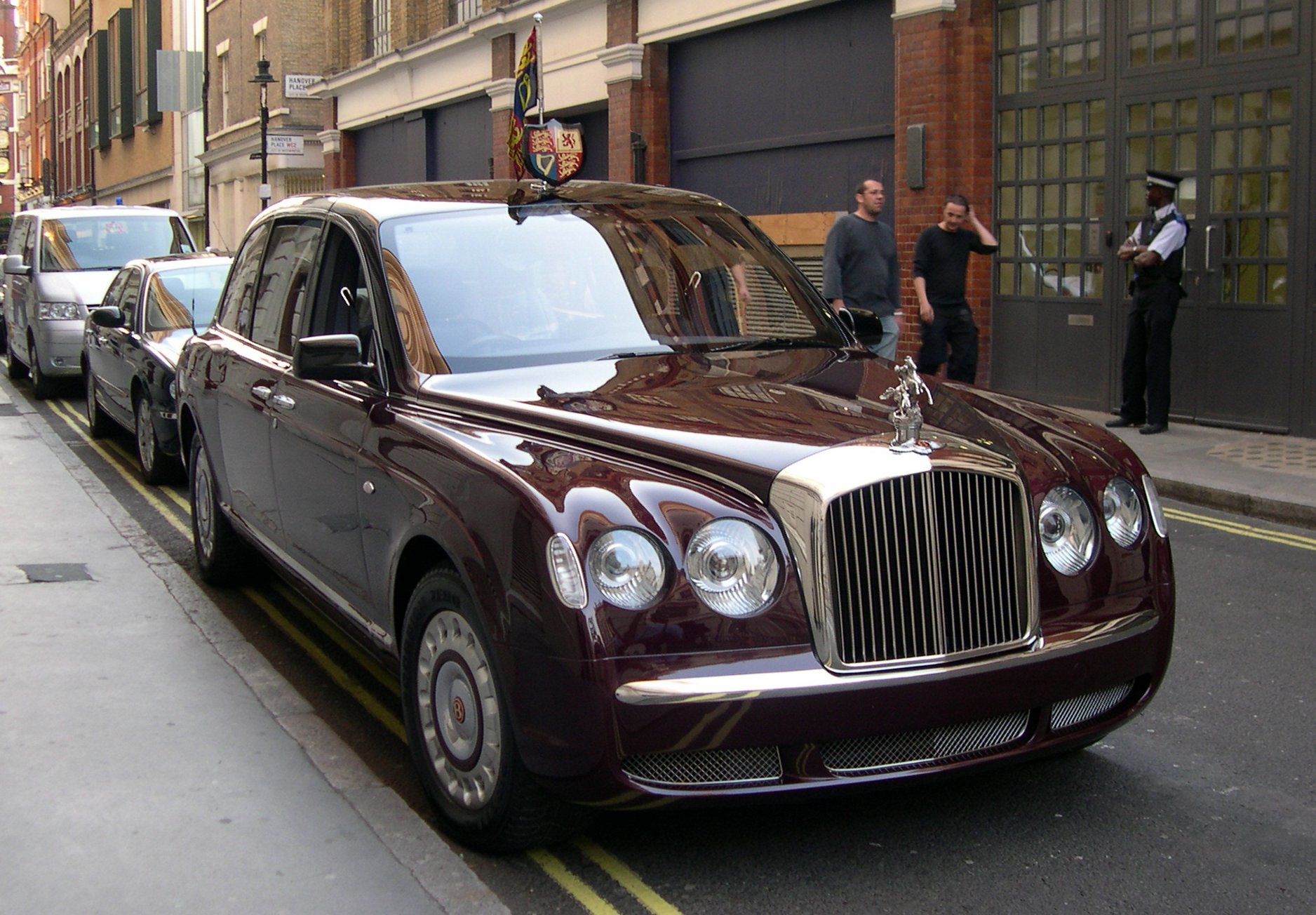
Queen Elizabeth II's Bentley State Limousine

Most civilian armored cars are created by fitting aftermarket upgrades to standard production cars. Several car manufacturers produce armored car models from the factory, such as the Audi Security Vehicles (A6 and A8 models), Lincoln Town Car BPS, Hyundai Equus, BMW Security series (3 Series, 5 Series, 7 Series and X5 models), the Mercedes Benz Guard vehicles (E, ML, GL, G & S Class).

=== Aftermarket conversion ===
Vehicles not offered with factory protection are converted by specialist armoring companies; examples with articles here include International Armoring Corporation, INKAS and Alpine Armoring.

A conversion begins by stripping the vehicle down to bare steel or aluminum, after which ballistic steel, composite panels and multi-layer bullet-resistant glass are fitted inside the existing bodywork, so that a well-executed result is visually indistinguishable from the standard car. Lightweight ballistic steel is the usual opaque material, with Dyneema, roughly a quarter the weight of ballistic steel, and Kevlar used where mass matters more, as on sports cars. Before armoring begins the converter calculates the vehicle's center of gravity, finished weight and spring rates so that handling is not compromised by the added mass. A typical conversion adds about 1,500 pounds and takes six to eight weeks on common platforms such as the Mercedes-Benz S-Class, Range Rover, Cadillac Escalade, Chevrolet Tahoe and Chevrolet Suburban.

Some civilian armored cars may be one-off unique vehicles with no standard equivalent, such as the Presidential state car of the United States, which is styled like a Cadillac but reportedly is built on the same medium-duty truck platform as the GMC TopKick.

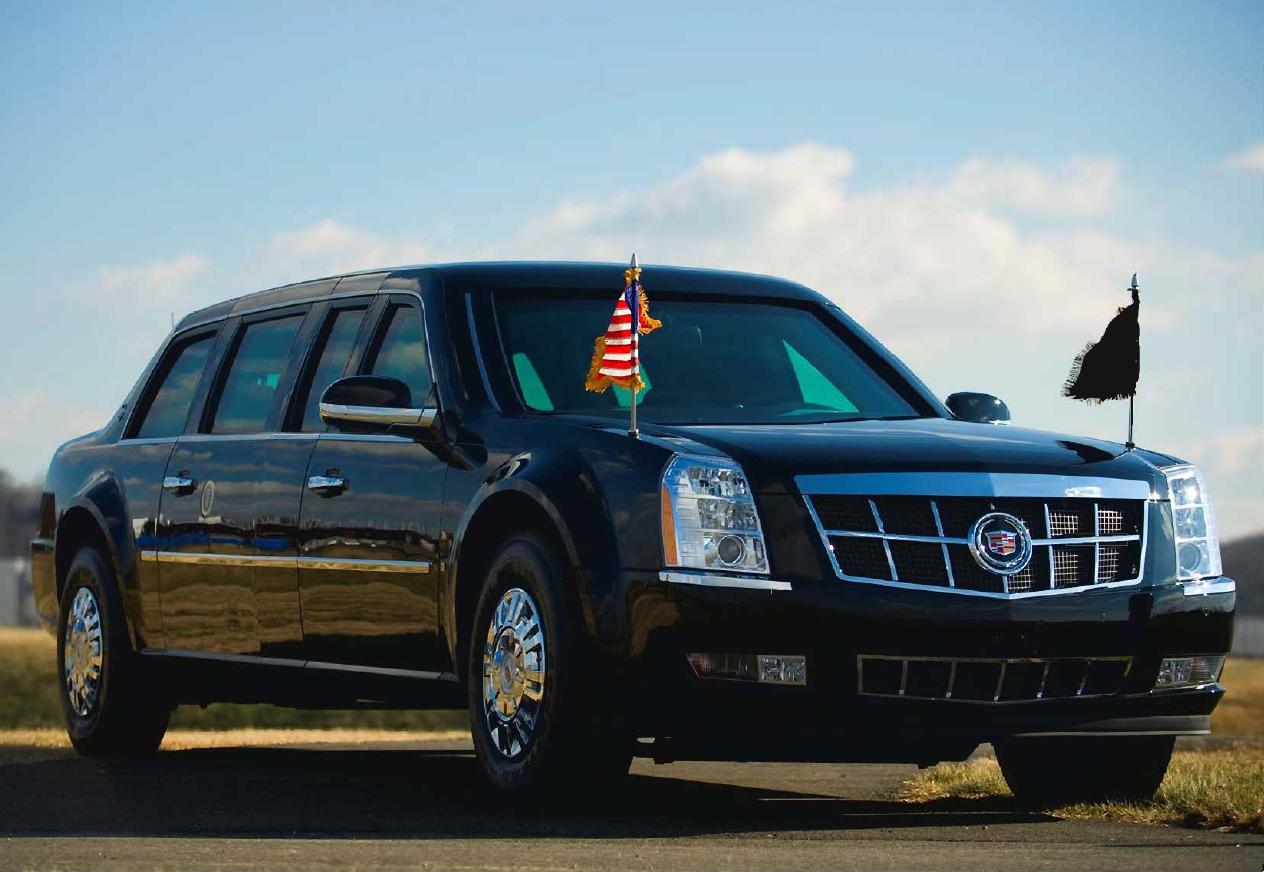
Presidential State Car of the United States, also known as Cadillac One

== Certification ==
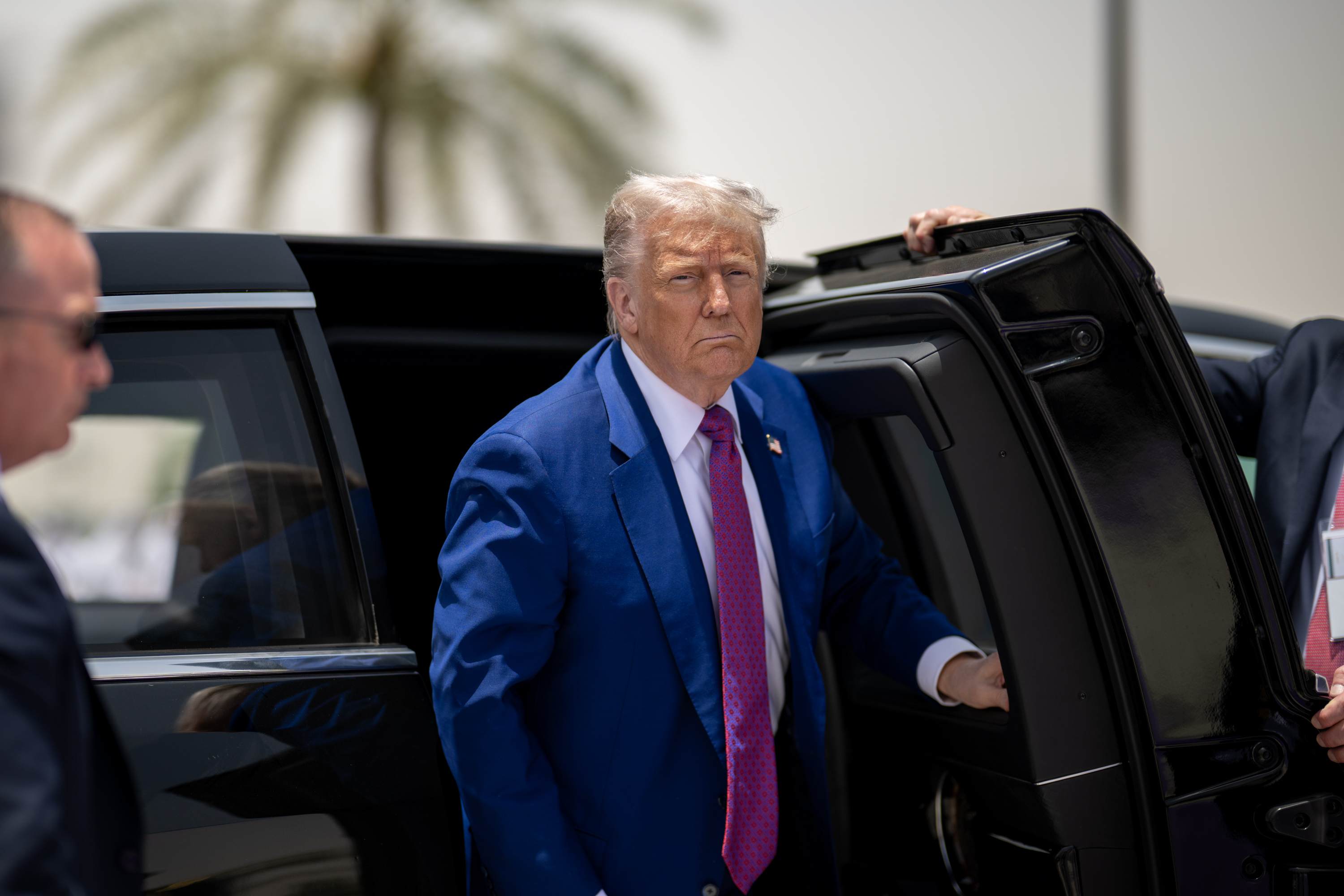
Armored door on Presidential state car (United States)

There are a variety of armoring standards which relate to non-military armored vehicles, the most common are:

- Ballistics Rating (BR): This is a European standard which certifies the materials used both transparent (BR - DIN EN 1063) and opaque (FB - DIN EN 1522/23), general guidelines on vehicle construction and covers 3 levels from 2 to 7 . This is usually grouped under a single definition of B, e.g. B6
- Vereinigung der Prüfstellen für angriffshemmende Materialien und Konstruktionen (VPAM) - VPAM have a number of standards that relate to non-military armored vehicles, they are:
  - APR 2006 - These are the general test guidelines for armored products.
  - PM 2007 - This covers the materials used.
  - BRV 1999 and 2009 - This certification indicates that the whole vehicle has been tested instead of just the materials used.
  - ERV 2010 - Blast protection certification.
- Vehicle Security Advisory Group (VASG) - A British Standard for armored car construction and testing.
- National Institute for Justice (NIJ) - The American National Institute of Justice certification, covers body armor as well as vehicles and covers 5 levels.

== See also ==
- Non-military armored vehicle
- Official state car
- Presidential state car (Russia)
- Presidential state car (United States)
