= Police armored vehicle =

Armoured vehicle used by police tactical units

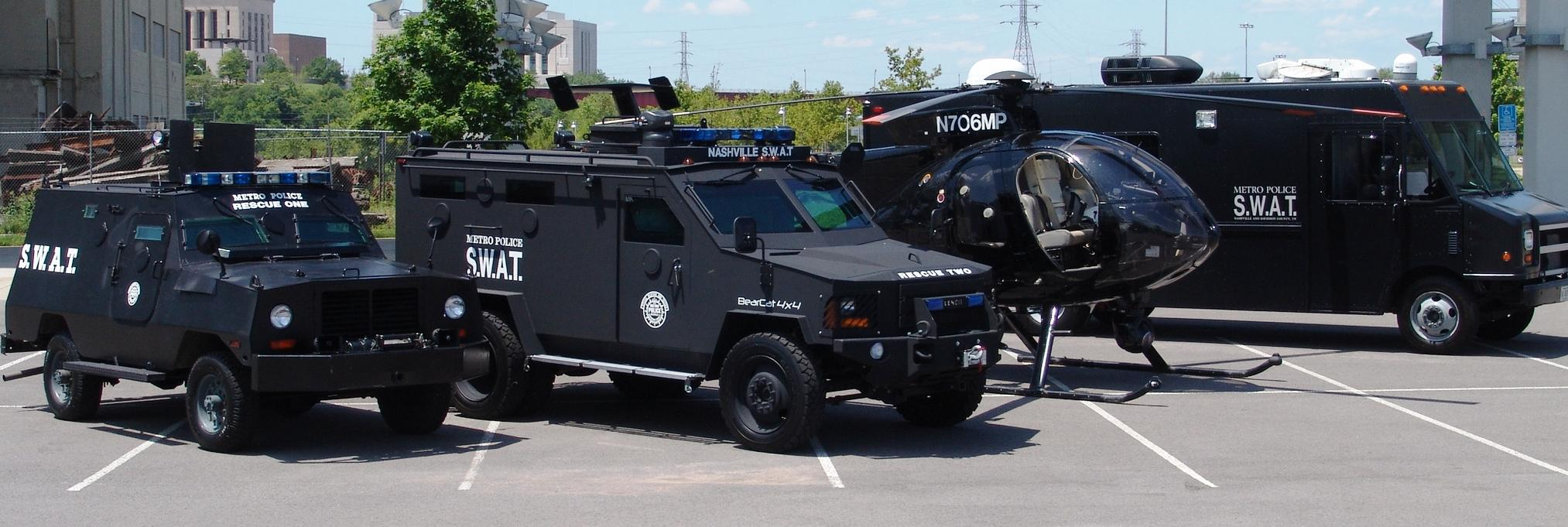
Metro Nashville Police SWAT vehicles. From left to right: Cadillac Gage Ranger, Lenco BearCat, MD 500 helicopter, tactical operations center step van

A police armored vehicle, also referred to as a police rescue vehicle, armored rescue vehicle, tactical police vehicle, or SWAT vehicle, is a non-military armored vehicle used by police, primarily police tactical units and riot police, to respond to incidents that necessitate their use. They are most often in configurations similar to military light utility vehicles, infantry mobility vehicles, or armoured personnel carriers. They are generally designed to have armor that can sufficiently block high-caliber rounds, space to carry the unit's equipment, and sufficient passenger seating; some also allow for additional personnel to hang onto the side of the vehicle in transit.

== Production ==
A police armored vehicle may simply be an unarmored van, truck, or SUV used to transport equipment or officers or used as a command post. Other more specialized vehicles may be demilitarized (i.e. stripped of heavy weaponry) armored personnel carriers or MRAPs acquired as military surplus or designed specifically as police vehicles to allow officers to operate in situations where armed confrontation is likely. Specialized heavy-duty commercial vehicles can be up-fitted and built solely as police armored vehicles, such as the Lenco BearCat or the Alpine Armoring Pit-Bull, which are built on a Ford F-Series chassis. Ambulances and armored cars can also be converted into police armored vehicles, though this is less common.

== By country ==
=== China ===
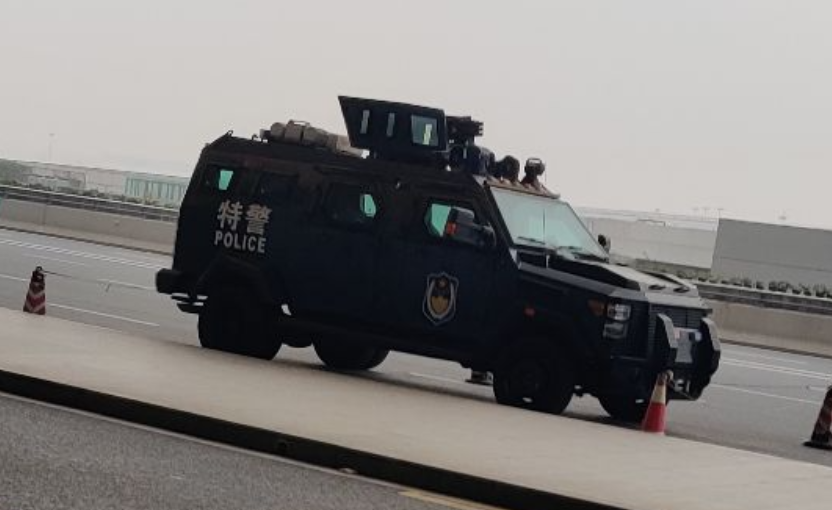
Chengdu police Saber Tooth Tiger truck

In China, one of the most widely used tactical vehicles used by the police is the "Saber tooth tiger". It is based on the Ford F-550 and, according to its manufacturer, can withstand M16 and AK-47 rounds, has multiple gun ports, a top speed of 130km/h, a maximum occupancy of 10 personnel and a cost of 2 million yuan (US$298,830).

=== France ===
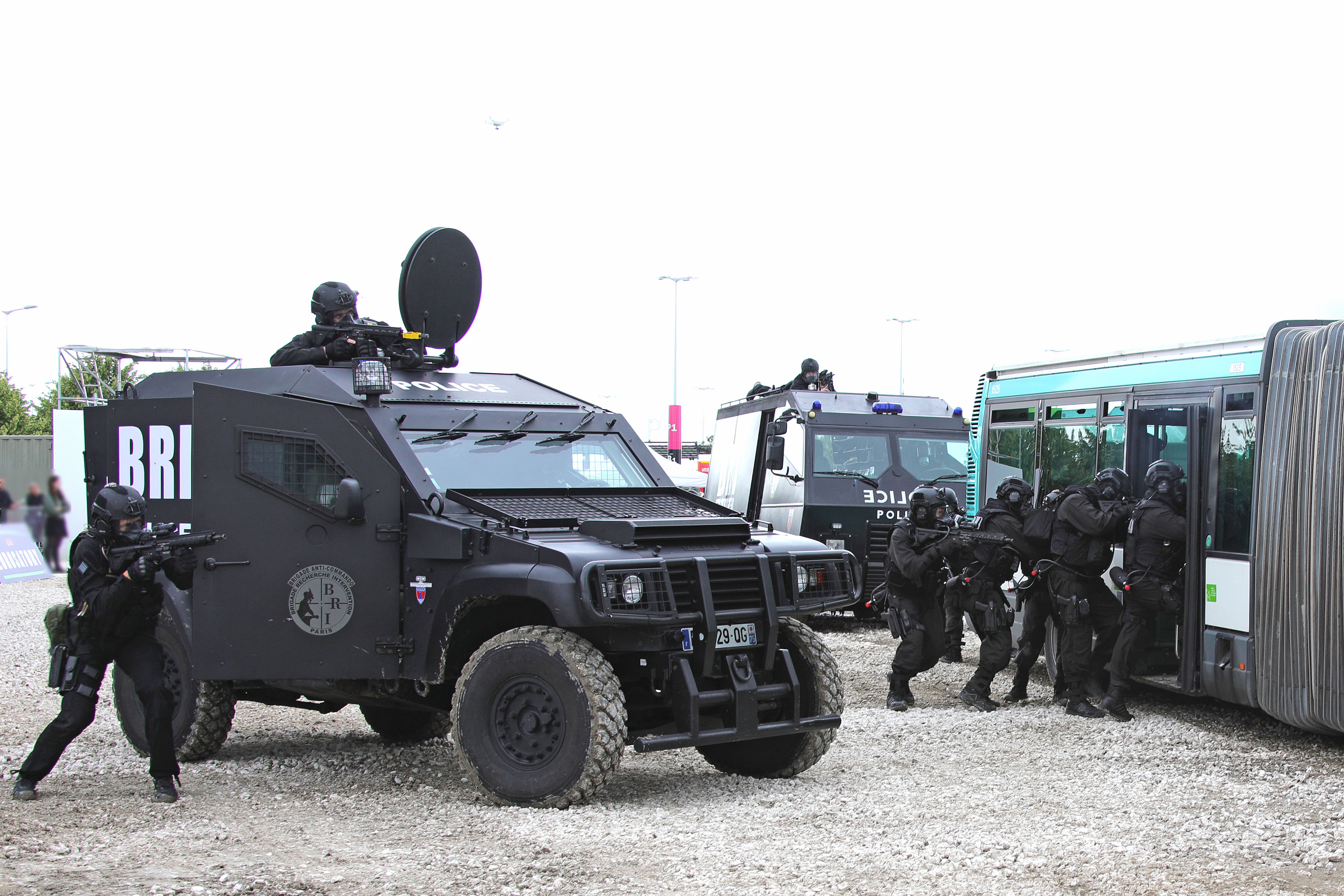
Armored vehicles of the French Research and Intervention Brigade

Among other armoured vehicles, the National Police RAID and Search and Intervention Brigade are equipped with different armoured vans such as the Panhard PVP, former armored cars, and infantry mobility vehicles such as the Nexter Titus.

=== Germany ===
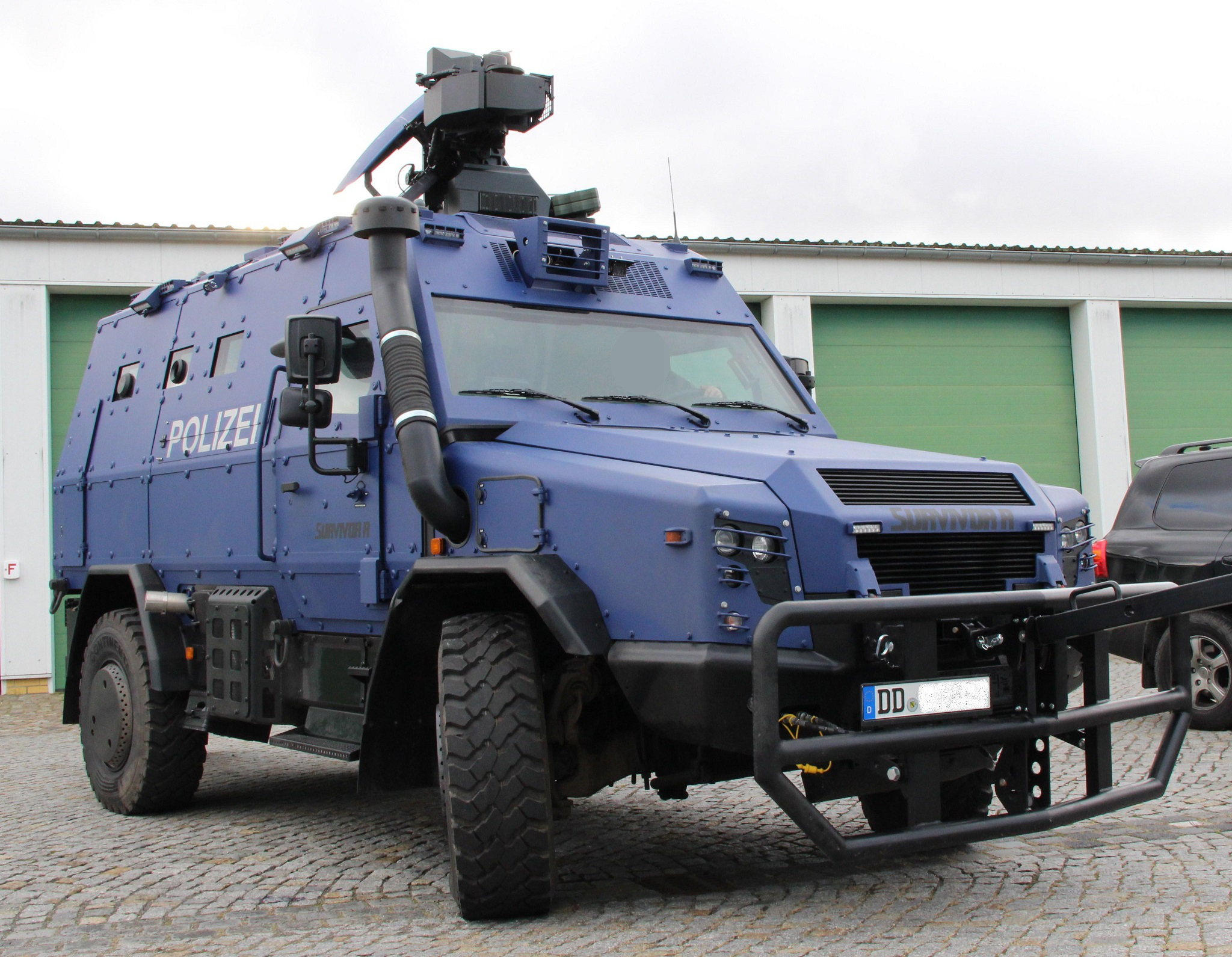
An RMMV Survivor R of the State Police of Saxony in Germany

Armoured police vehicles were first introduced after World War I by German police forces, who had more than hundred armoured vehicles called Sonderwagen (German for special automobile). Nowadays the Federal Police and the state police forces still maintain armoured vans, like Sonderwagen 4 and Sonderwagen 5. The federal police recently also ordered the LAPV Enok in addition to its Mowag Eagle and ATF Dingo. The SEK special state police units use armored vehicles like the LAPV Enok and the Survivor R.

=== Japan ===
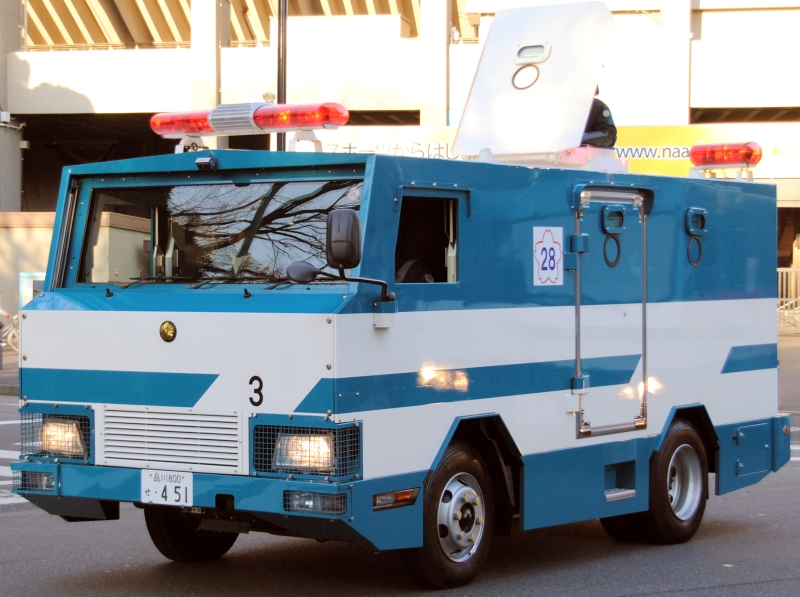
A Mitsubishi Fuso Canter Special Armored Vehicle Type PV-2 of the Tokyo Metropolitan Police Department

Riot Police Units have been operating some series of Armoured buses (警備車, Keibi-sha), mainly used as mobile shelters and barriers. More heavily armored vehicles called Special Armored Vehicles (特型警備車, Tokugata-keibi-sha) were introduced in the 1960s. The first deployed model was called Type F-3, based on Mitsubishi's cab-after-engine trucks. They were initially treated as idlers because there are only few reports of gun violence in Japan, but they were highly appreciated during the Asama-Sansō incident in 1972 and their significance were widely recognized.

After several model changes, Type PV-2 based on the Mitsubishi Fuso Canter is now deployed nationwide, mainly for anti-firearms squads. There are also simplified versions called Special Armored Vans (特型遊撃車, Tokugata-yūgeki-sha) and much larger Heavy Special Armored Vehicles (銃器対策警備車, Jūki-taisaku-keibi-sha); the latter is dedicated to the Special Assault Teams.

=== New Zealand ===
The New Zealand Police uses a small fleet of unmarked and armoured Toyota Land Cruisers for matters of nation security or high-risk firearm incidents. The vehicles known as Armoured Special Purpose Vehicles are both bullet and blast resistant designed to blend into normal traffic. Based in Auckland, Wellington and Christchurch the Land Cruisers are used by the Armed Offenders Squad (AOS) and Special Tactics Group (STG) for operations and incidents across the country. The New Zealand Police have operated vehicles similar since the early 2000, but these Land Cruisers which became operational in 2019 are the first specialist vehicles to be armoured. In 2024 the New Zealand Government invested over $250 million [NZD] into police equipment including 55 new specialist vehicles, although the exact number is unknown a small number of these will be Armoured Special Purpose Vehicles.

=== United Kingdom ===
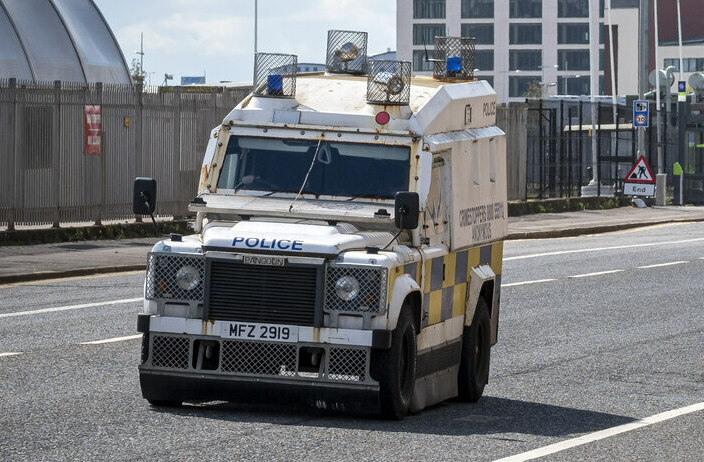
A Land Rover Defender-based OVIK Pangolin of the Police Service of Northern Ireland on patrol in Belfast

Police in the United Kingdom, particularly the Police Service of Northern Ireland (PSNI), has a great number of police role armoured vehicles based upon a range of base platforms including the Land Rover Defender and the OVIK Crossway. The internal security situation in Northern Ireland demands that the police operate up to 450 armoured vehicles which are optimised for public order duties. The PSNI uses OVIK Pangolin armoured public order vehicles. UK Police are seeing upgrades within their fleet across the different forces, with West Yorkshire Police acquiring two Lenco Bearcats, popular with United States Law Enforcement agencies.

=== United States ===
SWAT units may employ police armored vehicles for insertion, maneuvering, or during tactical operations such as the rescue of civilians, officers, firefighters, and/or military personnel pinned down by gunfire. To avoid detection by suspects during insertion in urban environments, SWAT units may also use modified buses, vans, trucks, or other seemingly normal vehicles. During the 1997 North Hollywood shootout, LAPD SWAT commandeered an armored cash-delivery truck , which they used to extract wounded civilians and officers from the raging firefight with the heavily armed bank robbers.

=== Tunisia ===
After the 2010–2011 revolution, Tunisia acquired Pit-Bull FX and Pit-Bull VX armored vehicles from the American manufacturer Alpine Armoring and assigned the FXs to the National Guard Special Unit (USGN) and the police’s National Rapid Intervention Brigade (BNIR). On 22 June 2018, the United States donated nine Pit-Bull VX armored personnel carriers to the counter-terrorism brigade of the Interior Ministry’s General Directorate of Intervention Units, to be used against terrorism and to secure the border region. The Pit-Bull FXs were regularly seen on deployments throughout the 2010s, and the BNIR deployed one after the May 2023 shooting at the Ghriba synagogue on Djerba.

== See also ==
- Internal security vehicle
