= Soft-skinned vehicle =

Non-armored military vehicle

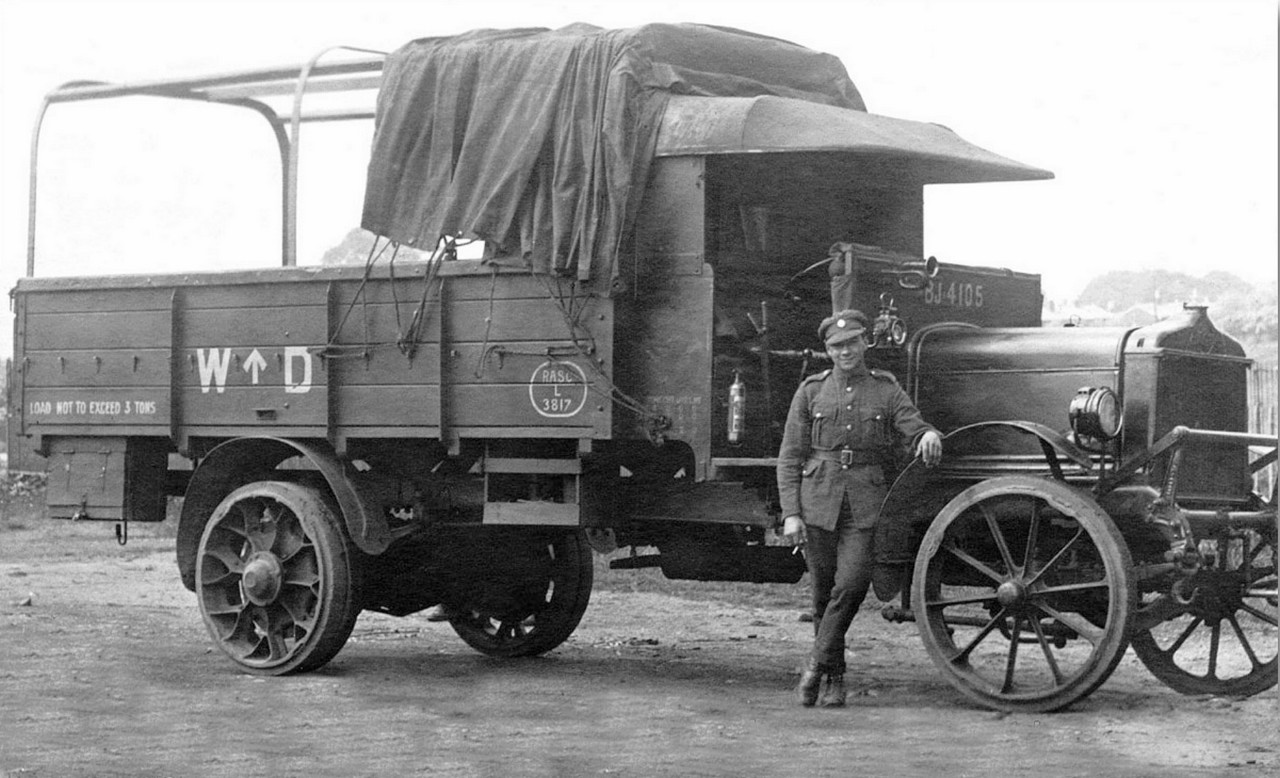
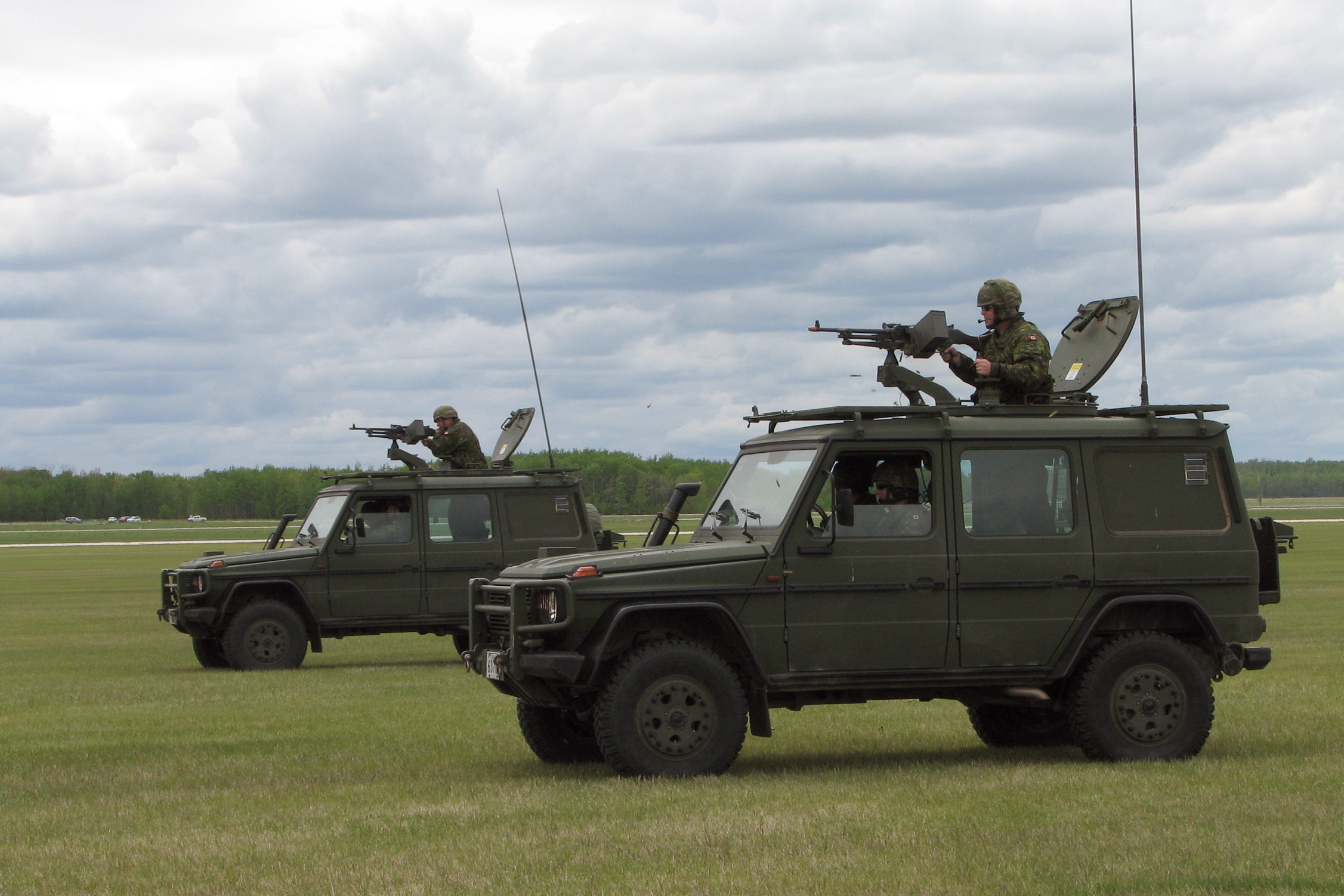
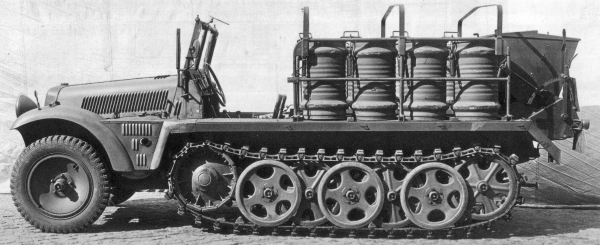
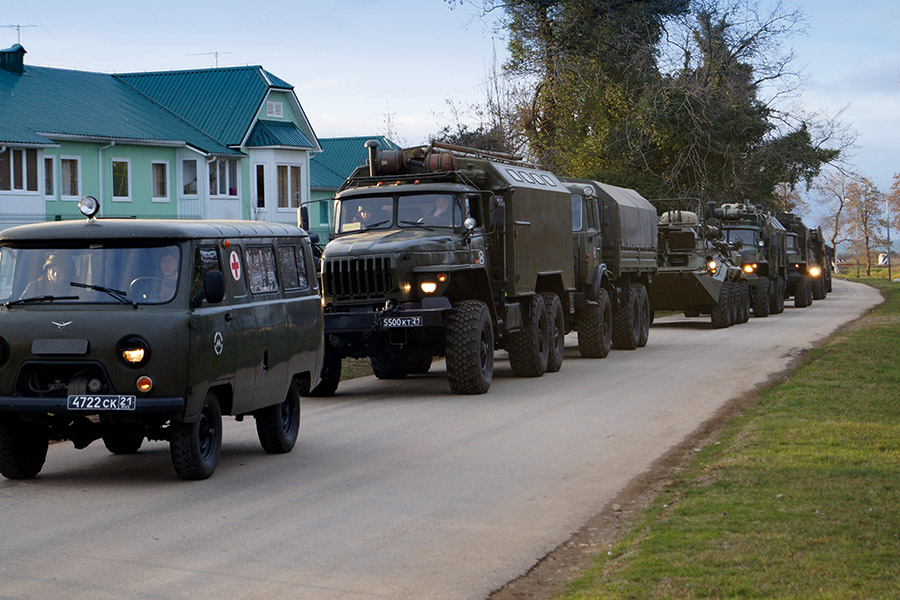
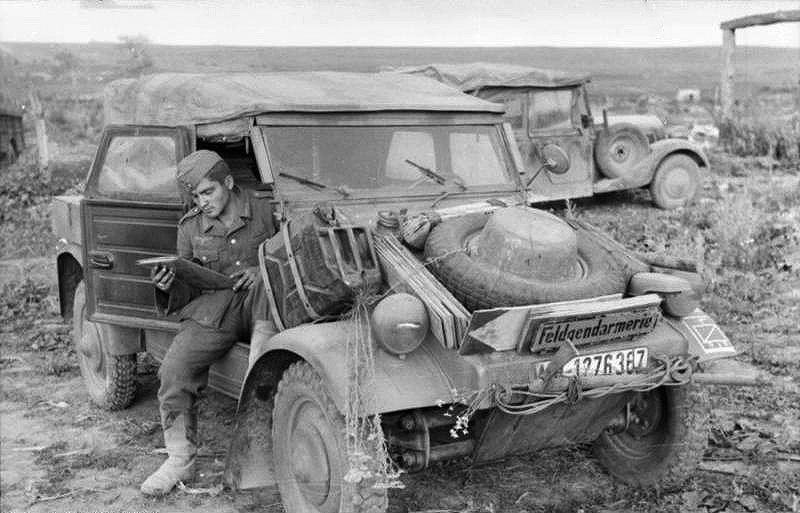
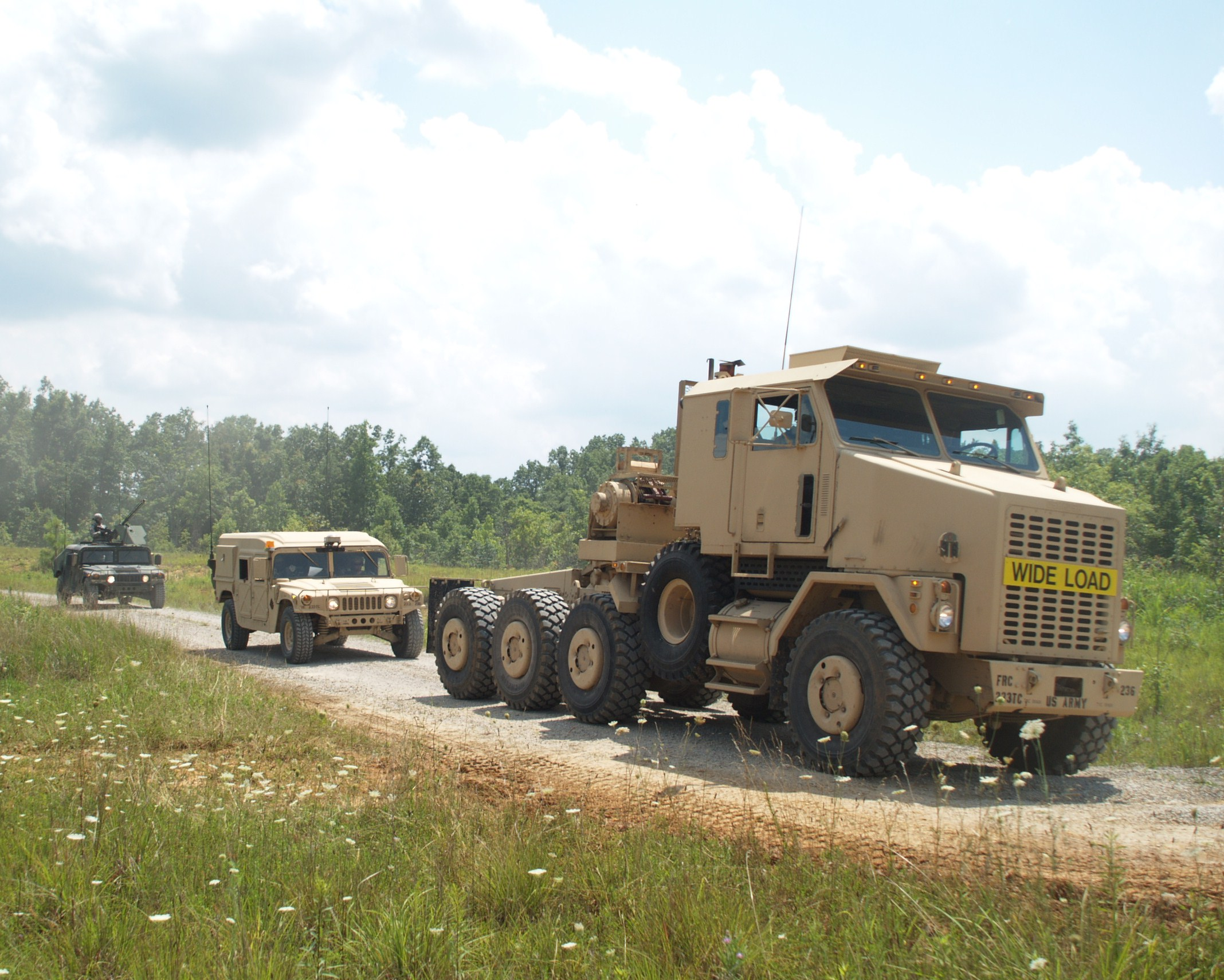
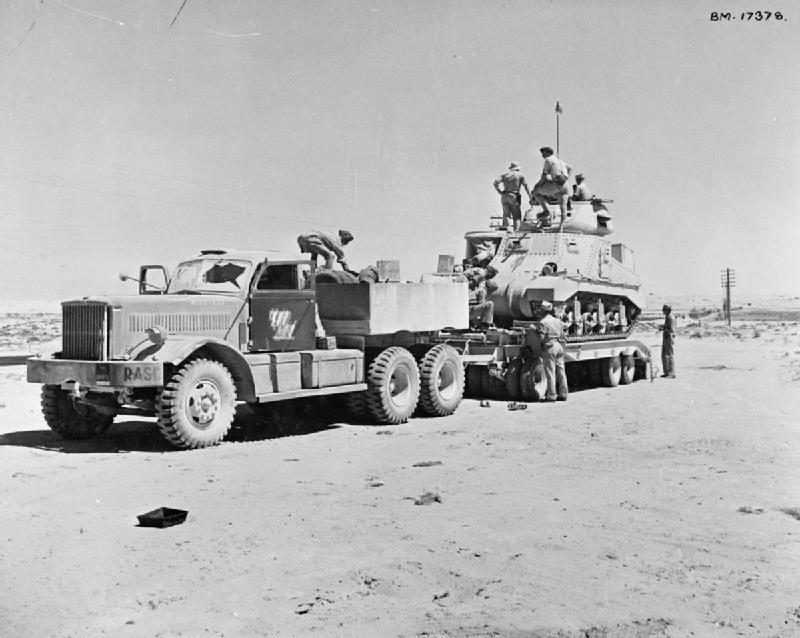
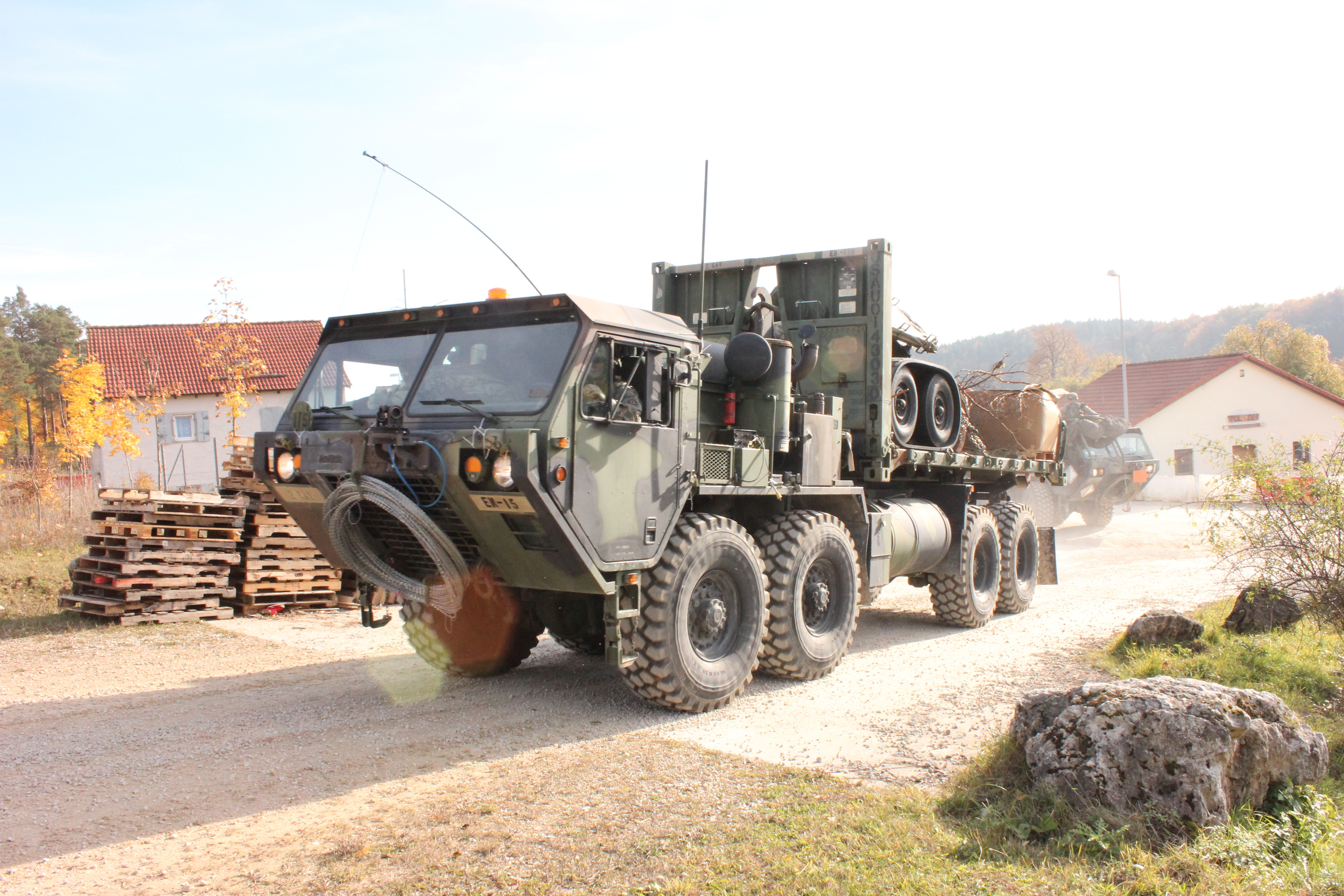
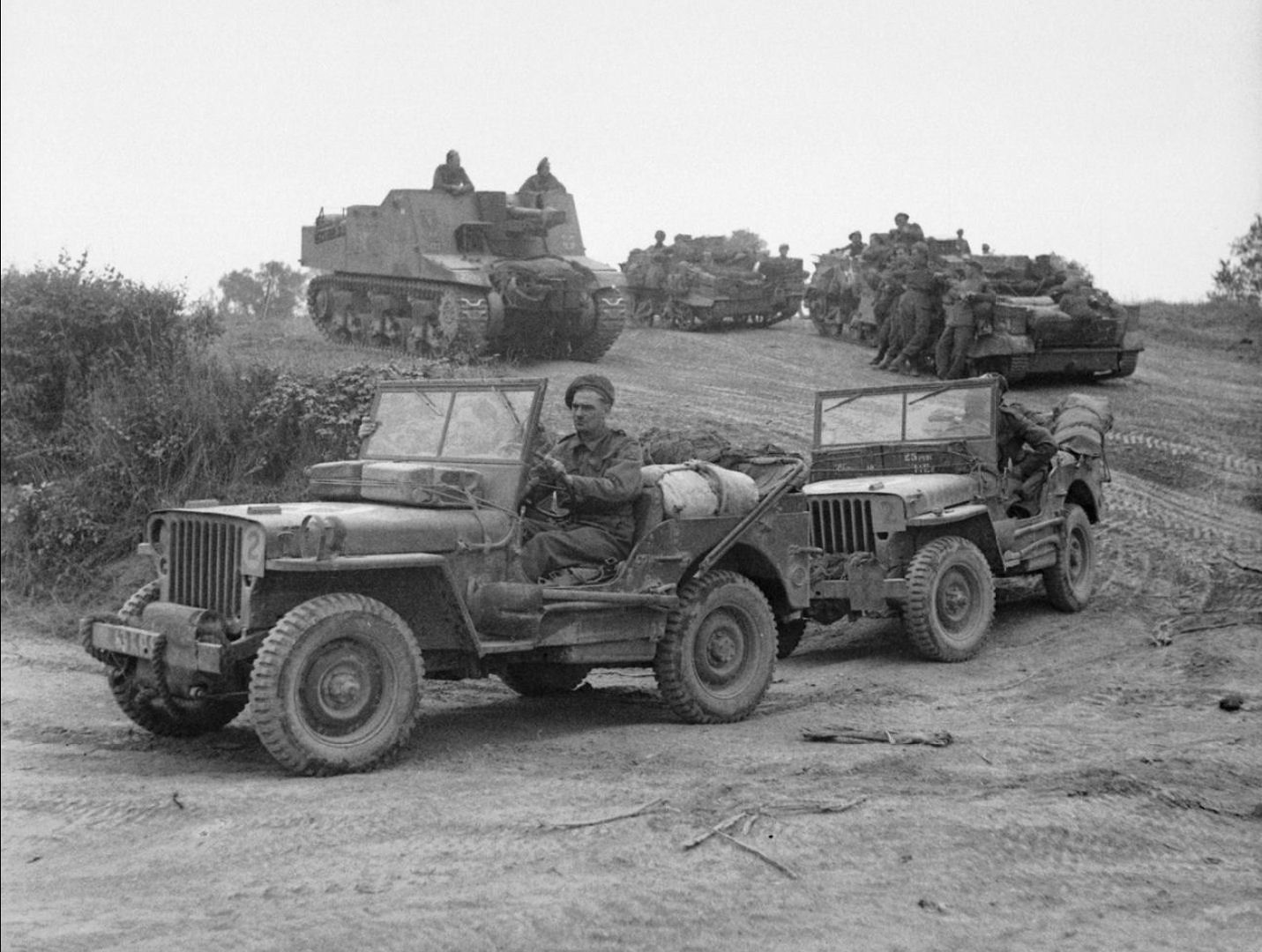

In military terminology, a soft-skinned vehicle, also known as a 'B' vehicle, is a vehicle that is not protected by vehicle armour. Lexicographer Eric Partridge believed the term soft-skinned vehicle first appeared in military parlance in the early 1940s.

Soft-skinned or 'B' vehicles are often considered wheeled military vehicles such as light utility vehicles and trucks, but they can be any unarmoured wheeled or tracked vehicle that is not primarily designed to be employed for offensive purposes. They can be purpose-designed models specifically built for military service, militarised versions of commercial vehicle models or standard commercial civilian vehicles pressed into military service. In some cases this class of vehicles may be fitted with vehicle armour for crew defence.

Historically in times of war, a number of military units have converted soft-skinned vehicles into armoured fighting vehicles. One of the first units to do so was the British Royal Naval Air Service. During the First World War the Royal Naval Air Service's Armoured Car Section converted a number of cars and trucks into armoured cars and armoured lorries by adding vehicle armour and various armaments.
