= International Armoring Corporation =

Manufacturer of armoured cars

- Type: Private
- Industry: Manufacturer of armored passenger vehicles
- Founded: 1993
- Headquarters: Ogden, Utah, USA
- Key people: Mark F. Burton; Francisco Ruiz
- Number of employees: 150+
- Website: Armormax.com

International Armoring Corporation (IAC) is a designer and manufacturer of armoured cars using light weight synthetic fiber armor laminates. Established in Ogden, Utah, United States on May 6, 1993, International Armoring Corporation uses lightweight synthetic armor laminates called Armormax (a material designed and developed by IAC). IAC designs and molds the armor to fit the vehicle rather than modifying the vehicle to fit the armor. IAC has sold 4,000 and 5,000 vehicles annually.

All design and material preparation is done in the company’s headquarters in Ogden, Utah and then shipped to its foreign facilities for installation.

The Mexican drug war has increased demand for armored vehicles. Corporate executives and political leaders, have ordered armored cars for protection.

The company IAC has been named one of the winners in 2003 – 2013 (19 awards. In 2009 IAC was honored with the best of state statue "BOSS" trophy for their contributions in community development. It also received an award in the FY 2006 Small Business Subcontractor Awards Program of UT-Battelle, LLC, operator of the Oak Ridge National Laboratory.

IAC won "Manufacturer of the Year" in 2012 and "Automotive / Transportation Company of the Year" in 2013 International Stevie Award for “The best Multinational Company in North America” in the 2008 and "The Best International Satellite Facility" in 2007. International Business Awards.

In 2006, Mark F. Burton, Founder and CEO of IAC, was recognized by Ernst & Young as “Entrepreneur of the Year.”

IAC were selected as the 2006 recipients of the “Contractor Small Business of the Year”. This award recognizes businesses that excel in contract performance that service and supply the U.S. Government.

Other awards for IAC include Entrepreneur magazine’s “100 Hottest Companies in America” and Inc. magazine’s “Inc. 500 - #6.”

In May 2021 an cash-in-transit vehicle, armored by ArmorMax, was subject to an attempted heist in South Africa. The resulting video went viral.

== See also ==
- Vehicle armour
