= Non-military armoured vehicle =

Armored vehicle operated outside military organizations

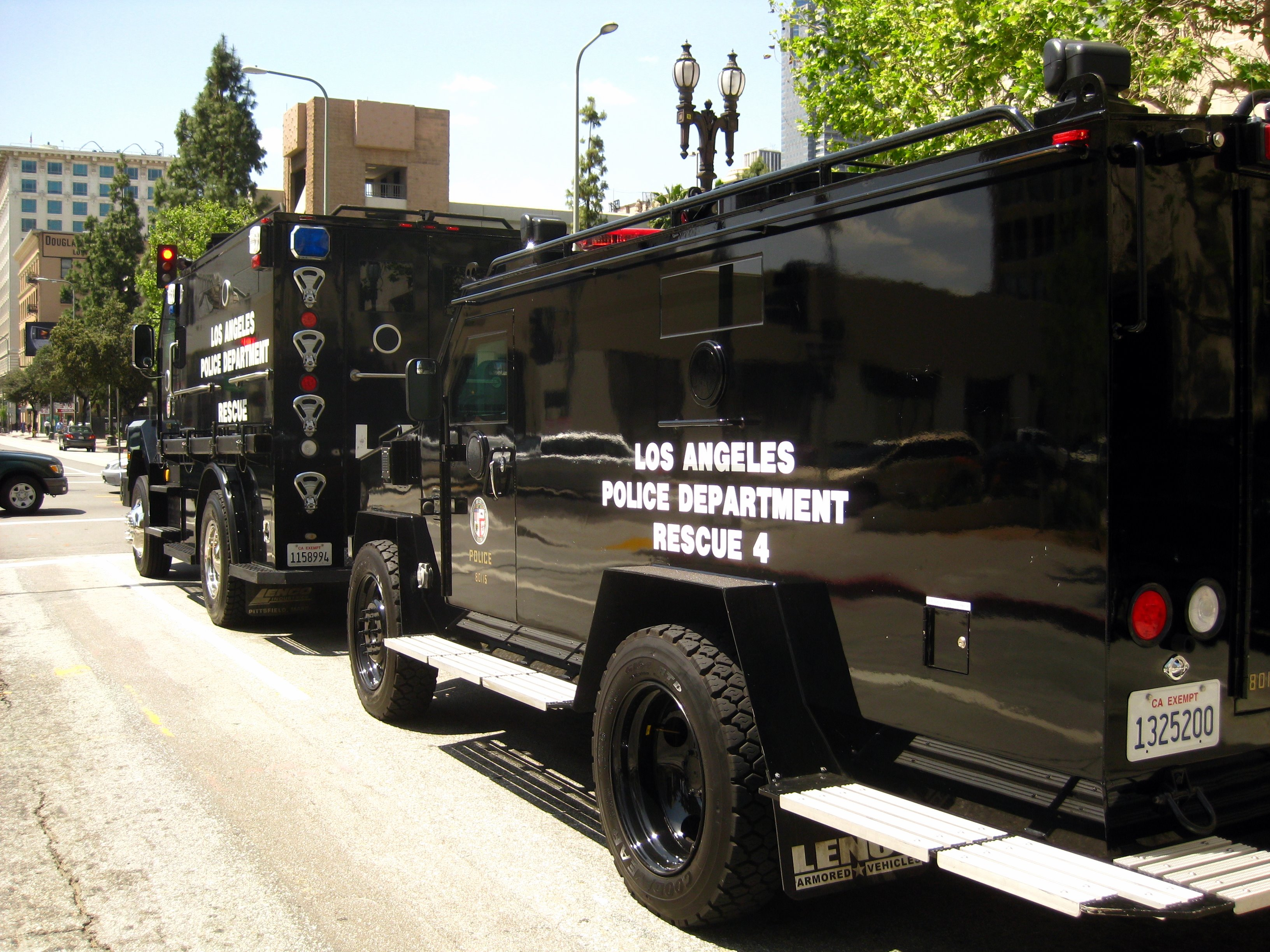
A common example of a non-military armoured vehicle is a SWAT vehicle, such as these vehicles operated by the Los Angeles Police Department.

Non-military armoured vehicles (or paramilitary armoured vehicles if used by a paramilitary) are armoured vehicles used outside professional armed forces. While primarily invented and used for defense/internal conflicts from an equally well armed organized force, armour technology has found a number of other uses outside of this military context.

== Internal security forces ==
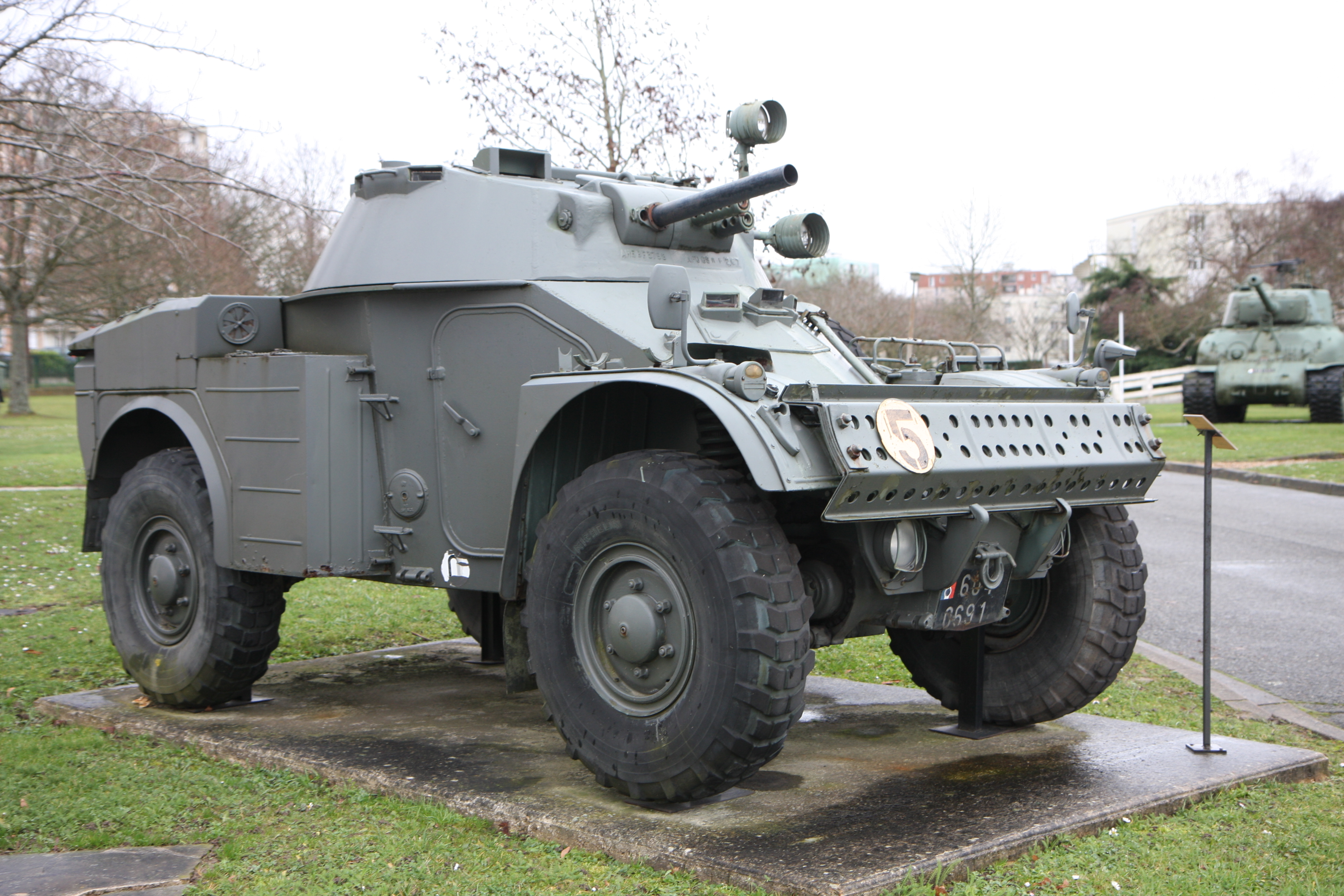
Decommissioned Panhard AML armoured car of the French National Gendarmerie

Several sovereign states employ a standing security force, akin to a military force but separate from the official military. These official forces are often equipped with armoured cars, although often fitted with less lethal armaments, such as water cannon.

In countries that employ a territorial reserve force, only mobilized in times of war for civil defense, these forces may also be equipped with armoured cars. As the main heavy armaments may be out of the country or with the main army, the civil defense force may only have these military specification armoured cars as their best defense.

In France the paramilitary National Gendarmerie is amongst other vehicles equipped with 70 Berliets.

The United Kingdom police, particularly the Police Service of Northern Ireland (PSNI), has a great number of police role armoured vehicles based upon a range of base platforms including the Land Rover Defender and the OVIK Crossway. The internal security situation in Northern Ireland demands that the police operate up to 450 armoured vehicles which are optimised for public order duties. The PSNI uses OVIK PANGOLIN armoured public order vehicles.

== Rebel forces ==
In times of civil war or rebellion, factions or opposition groups without sufficient access to military armour, may convert civilian vehicles into fighting vehicles, adding improvised vehicle armour.

Mexican drug cartels used armed trucks with improvised vehicle armour to fight both law enforcement and rival cartels called narco tanks or Monstrou.

== Construction equipment ==
Bulldozers, excavators, and other equipment are sometimes armoured to protect operators from debris.

== Fire engines ==
Fire engines used in HAZMAT and airport firefighting are sometimes armoured to protect firefighters from explosions.

== Emergency services ==
Several domestic police forces possess armoured vehicles. These may exist as part of specific response units, such as SWAT. Other forces in specific trouble spots, such as apartheid South Africa, or Northern Ireland at the height of The Troubles, may routinely patrol in armoured vehicles.

In Israel, the Emergency medical services also have armoured ambulances for the protection of patients and crew.

In Germany, the Sonderwagen or Specialwagon is used for riot-control. An armoured 6x6 vehicle, the Sonderwagen emblazoned with POLIZEI demonstrates the additional paramilitary capability of the Bundespolizei, which has arrest powers like the U.S. FBI but paramilitary capability like the U.S. National Guard.

== Prisoner transport ==
Lightly armoured vans and buses may also be used as Prisoner transport vehicles, as protection against attempts to break the prisoners out of custody.

== Buses ==
In some cases, buses may also be fitted with armour. These can also be used by the regular military, but are still serving their main purpose of transporting people.

== Valuables ==
Armoured cars often find use in transporting valuable commodities, usually currency, in order to provide a defence against robbery.

== VIP transport ==
Several VIPs such as businessmen, politicians and diplomats may choose to be transported, or provided with an armoured passenger car, as a protection against kidnap or assassination.

== Tornado chasing ==
In the field of tornado study, a vehicle has been specially modified to be able to drive into the heart of tornados to take measurements while protecting the occupants from debris.

== Gallery ==
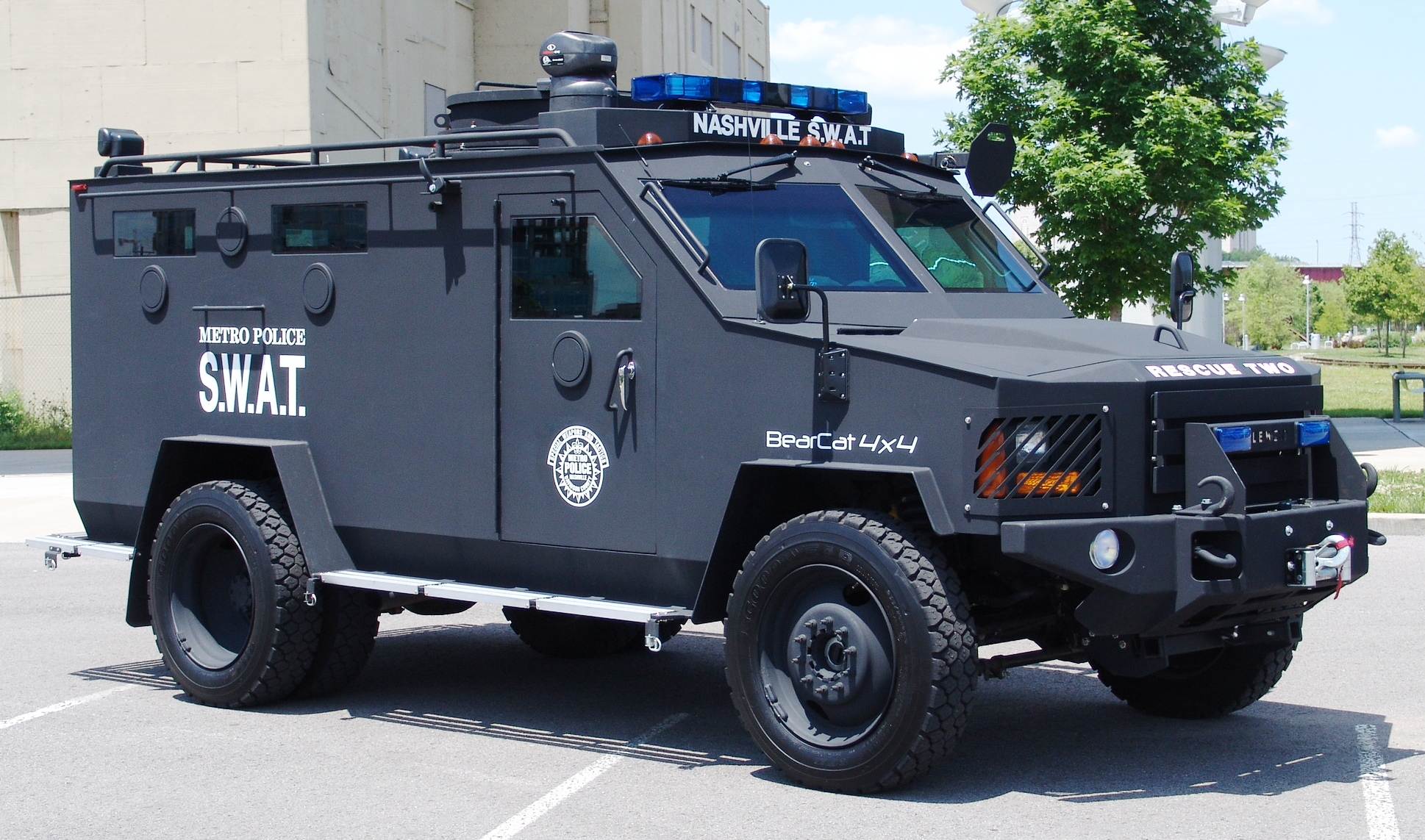
Lenco BearCat Armoured Rescue Vehicle Metropolitan Nashville Police SWAT.

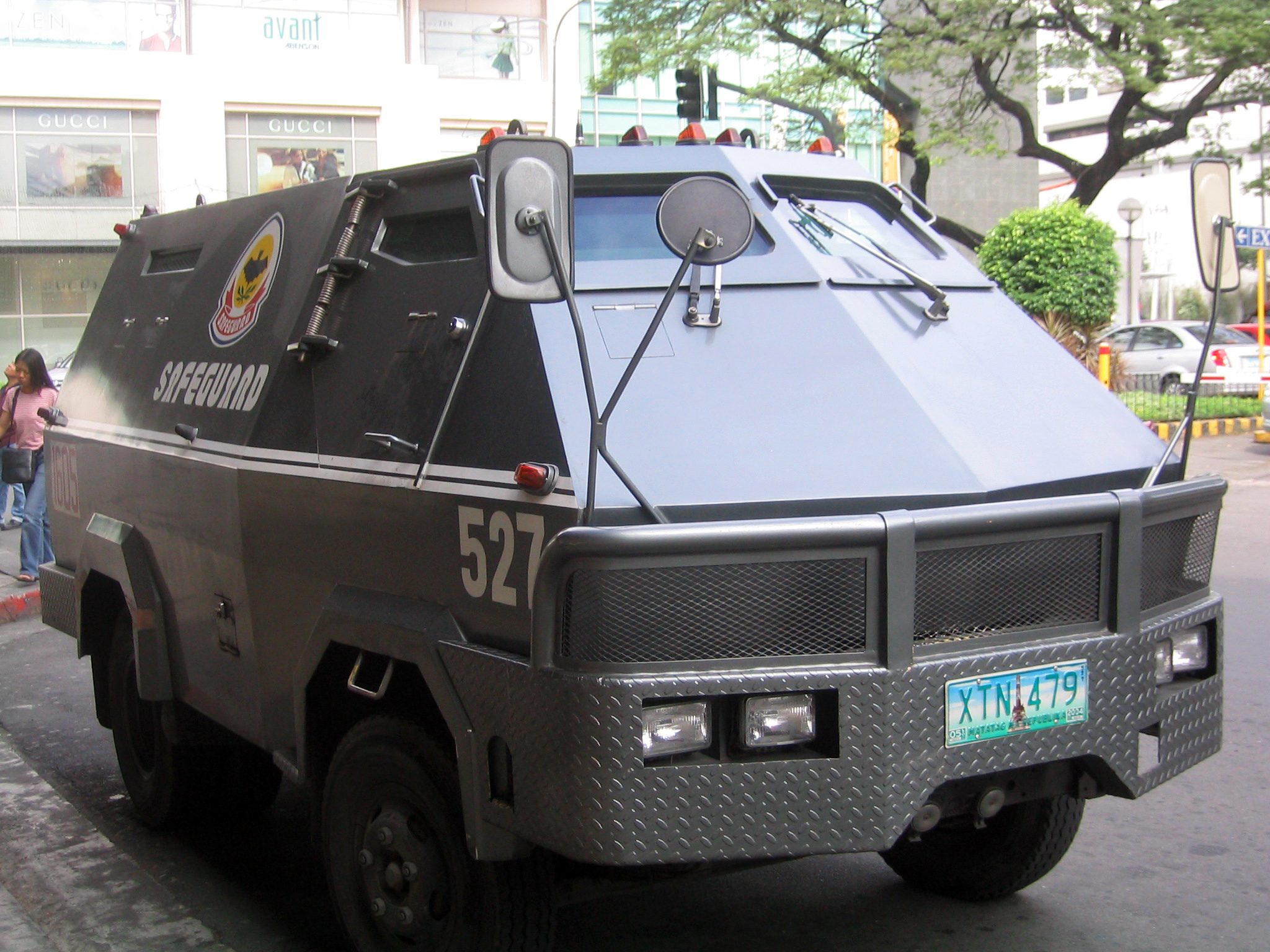
Armored van in Manila.

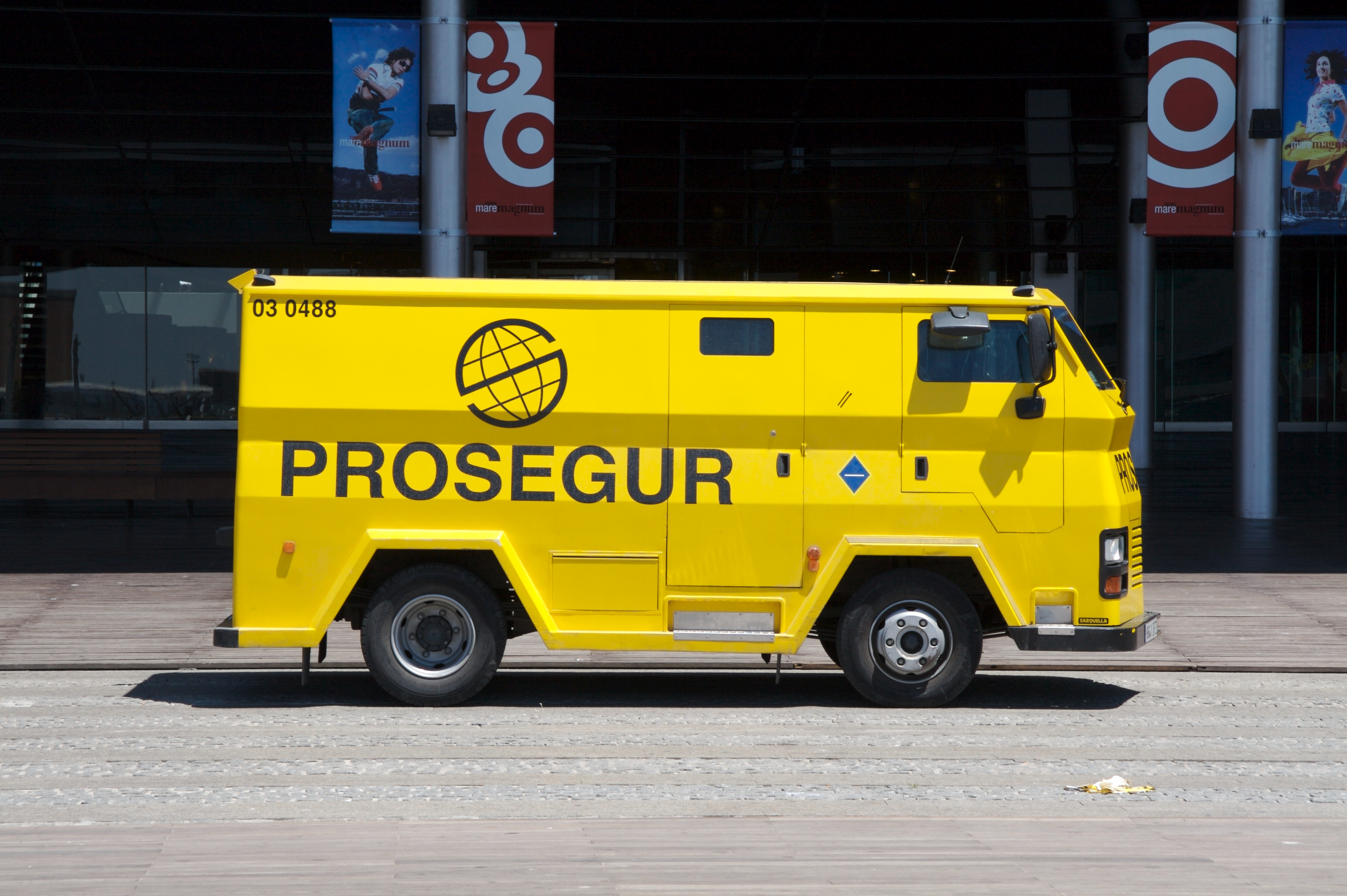
Prosegur armored truck in Barcelona.

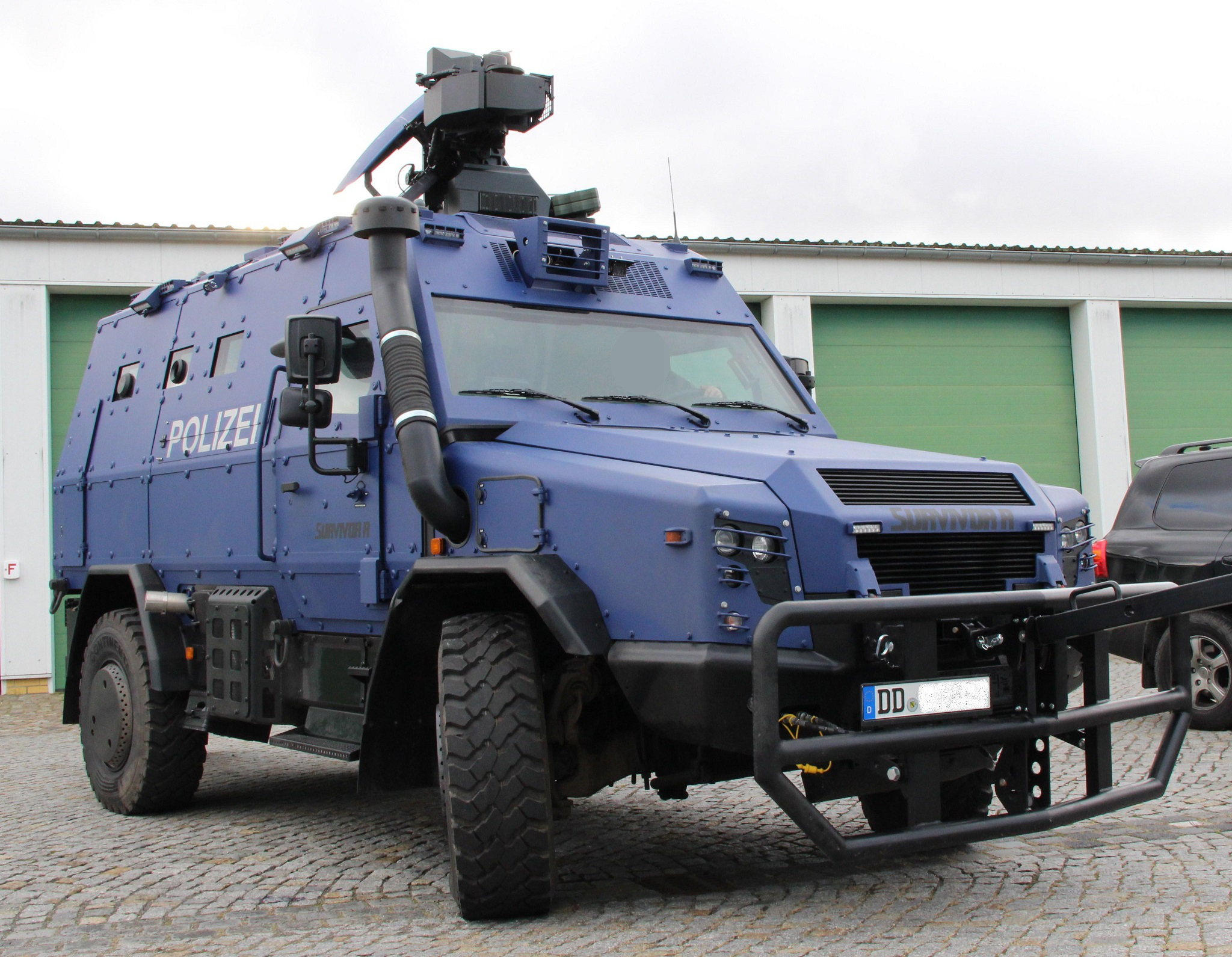
A Sonderwagen 5 of the Special Operational Unit (SEK) of the Saxony State Police in Germany

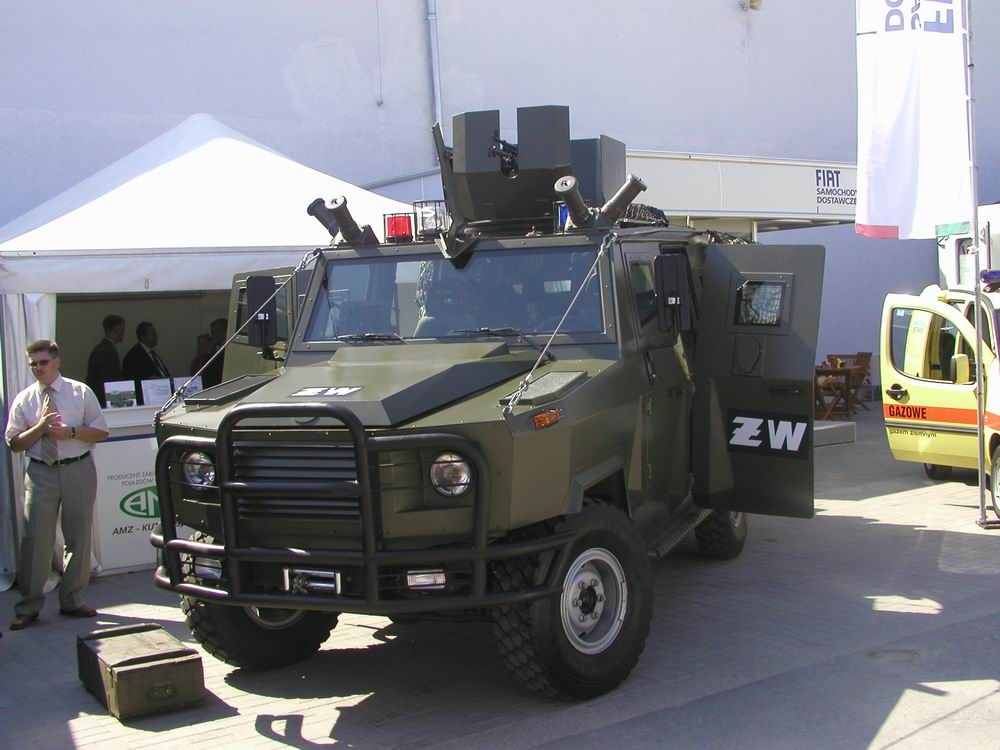
Polish Dzik-2 in the colors of the Polish Military Police.

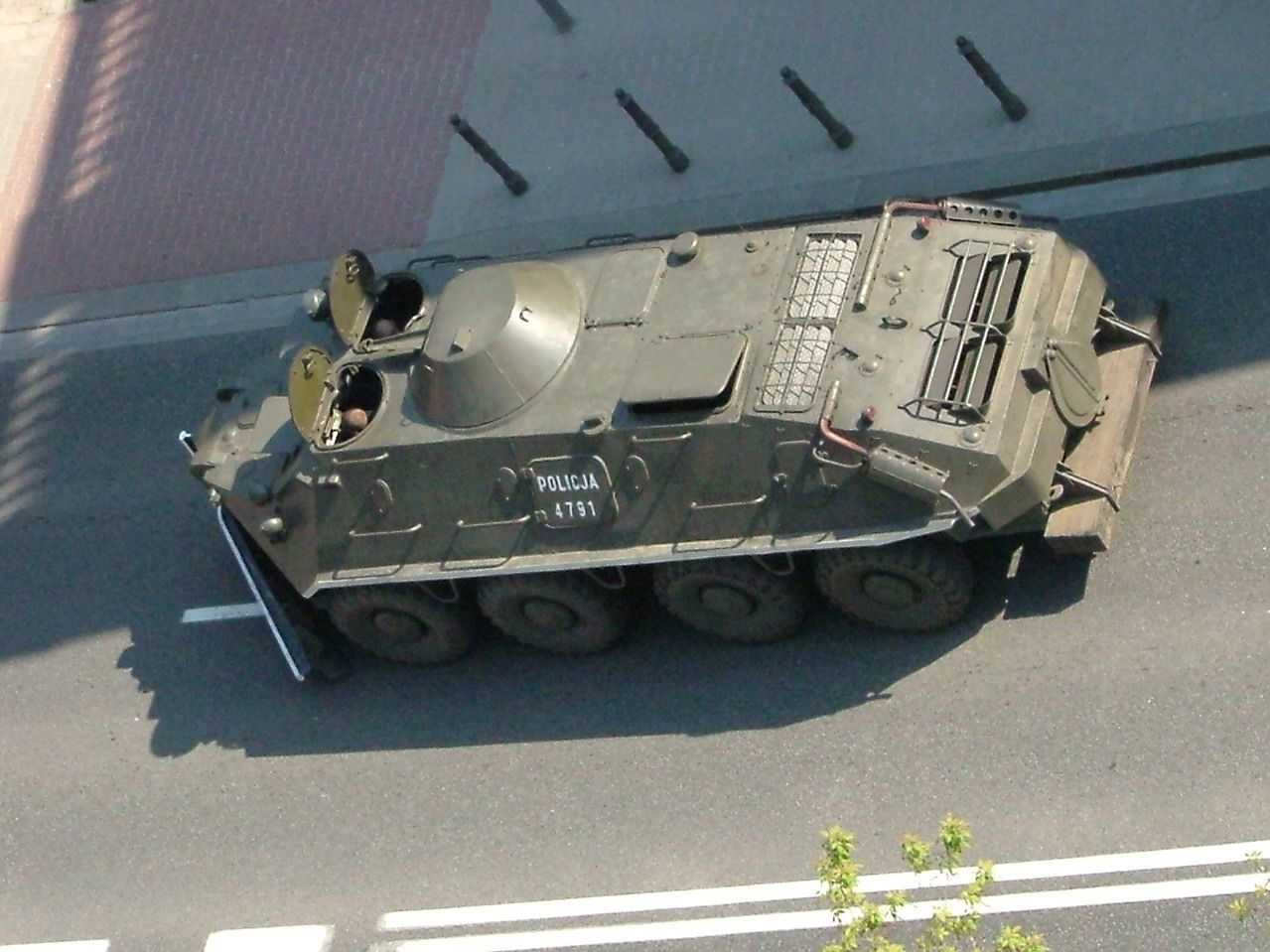
Polish Police in Warsaw - BTR-60PB.

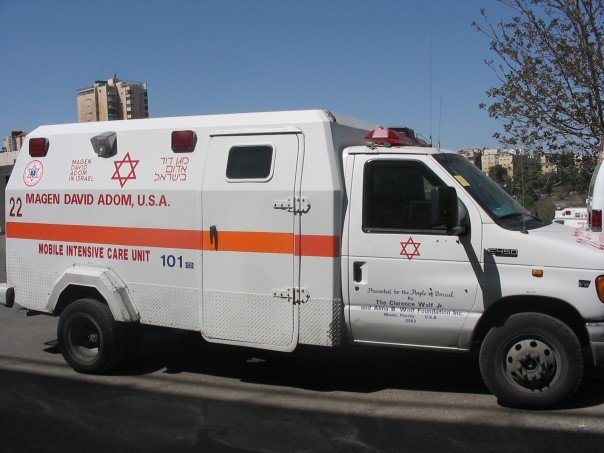
Israeli EMS armored MICU ambulance for when EMS crews may be shot at.

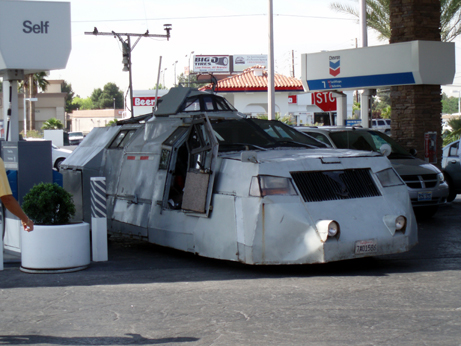
An armored Ford F-450 called a TIV that is used to intercept tornadoes.

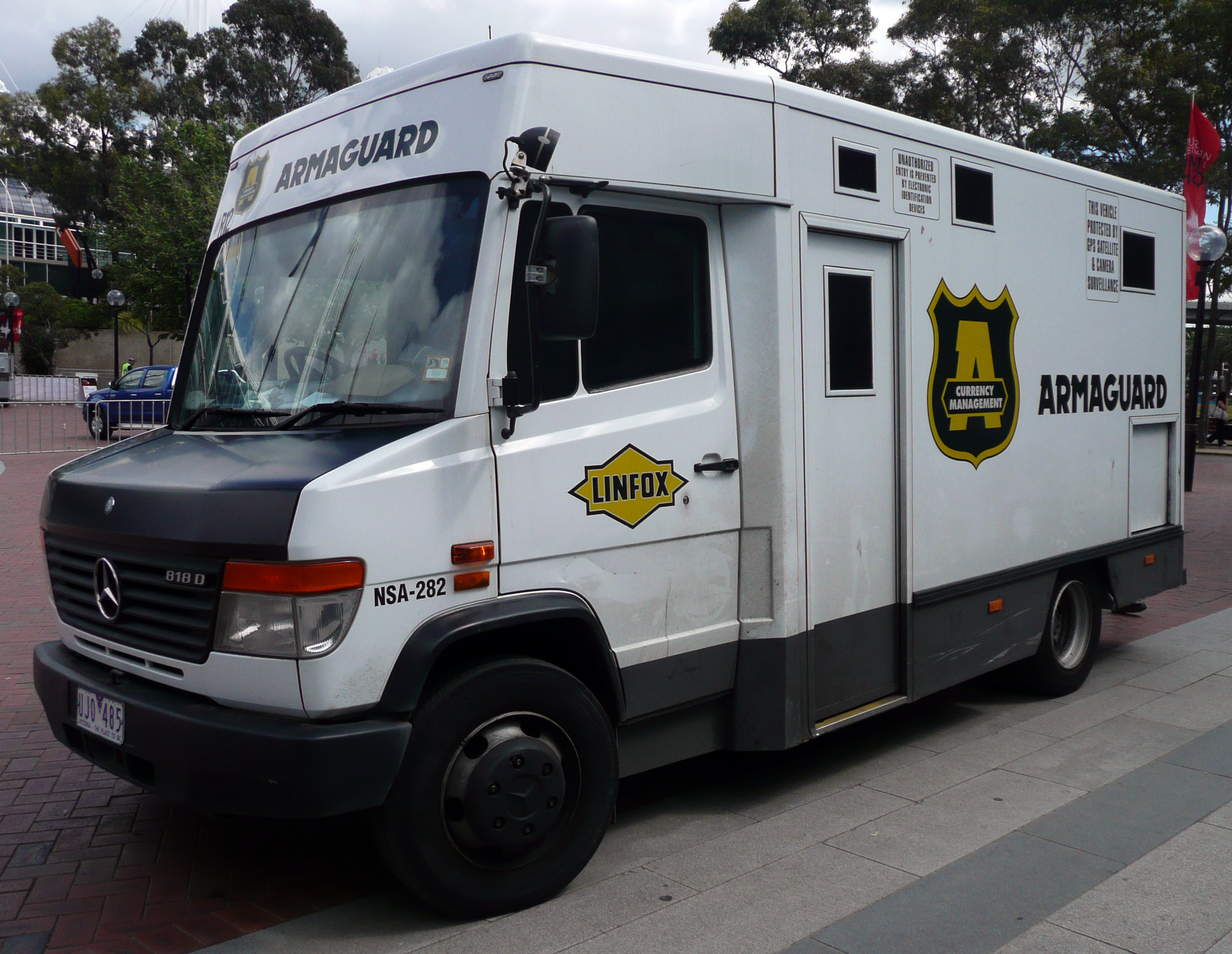
Mercedes-Benz Vario.

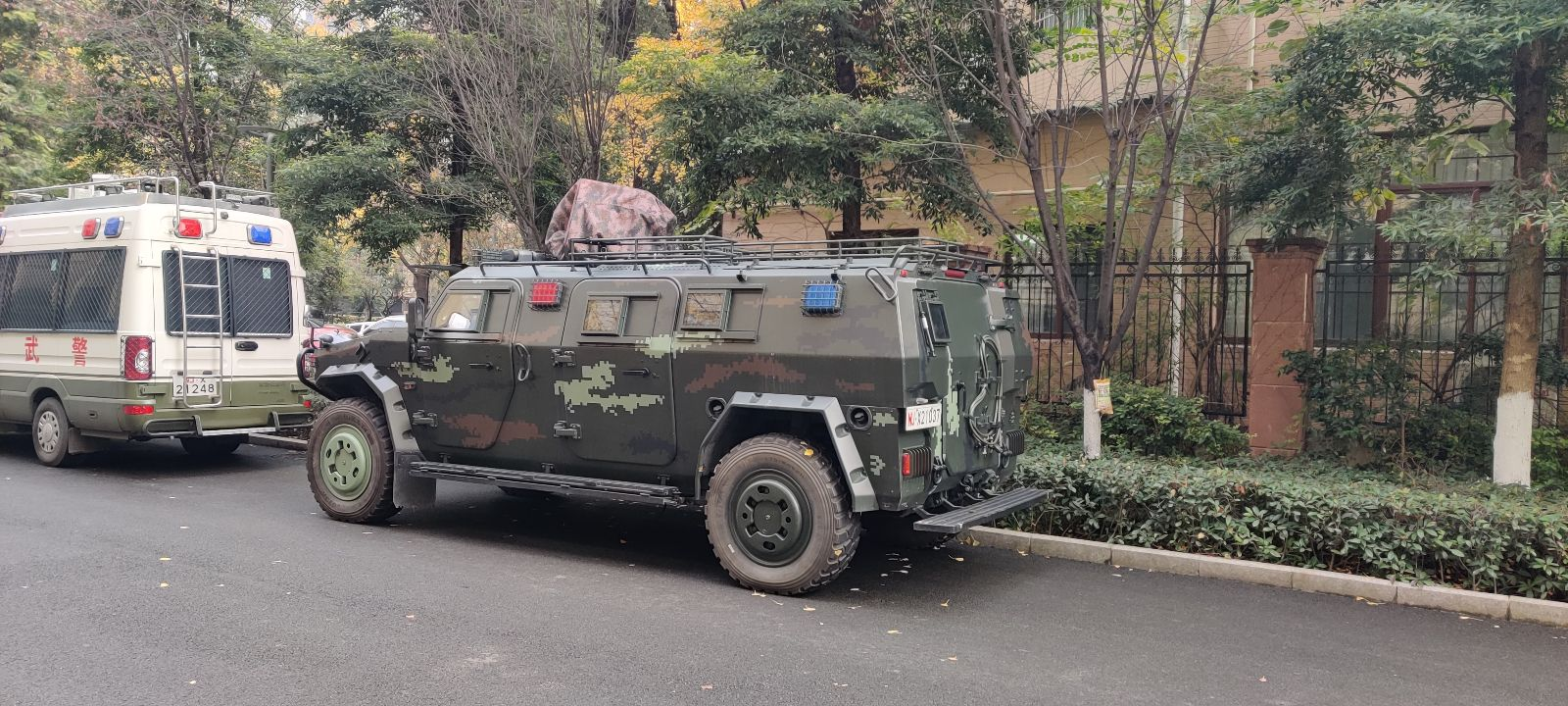
A People's Armed Police CSK-181
