= Peacekeeper =

Peacekeeper may refer to:

== General ==
- A person involved in peacekeeping
  - United Nations peacekeeping
- Peace officer
- Conservator of the peace

== Military ==
- The LGM-118 Peacekeeper, a land-based nuclear ICBM
  - Peacekeeper Rail Garrison, a mobile missile system for the LGM-118 Peacekeeper
- Cadillac Gage Ranger, armored fighting vehicles
  - Cadillac Gage Peacekeeper II, one of the two models of the vehicle

== Fiction ==
- The Peacekeepers, a 1988 Star Trek: The Next Generation novel by Gene DeWeese
- The Peacekeeper, a 1997 Canadian and American action film
- Peacekeepers (Farscape), a fictional military and law enforcement organization in Farscape
- Peacekeepers (The Hunger Games), the combined military and police force in Panem in The Hunger Games
- "Peacekeeper" (NCIS), a 2021 television episode
- Peacekeepers, a 1988 science fiction novel by Ben Bova

== Video games ==
- The Peace Keepers, a 1993 video game for the Super Nintendo Entertainment System
- Peacekeeper Revolver, a video game gun for the Phillips Cd-i video game console

== Other uses ==
- Peacekeeper (benchmark), a web browser benchmark from Futuremark Corporation
- Peacekeeper (EP), by Barkmarket, 1995
- "Peacekeeper" (song), by Fleetwood Mac, 2003
- The Peacekeepers (film), a 2005 documentary film
- Peacekeeper Park, an urban park in Calgary, Alberta, Canada
- Peacekeepers Way, a highway in Nova Scotia, Canada
- Newfoundland and Labrador Route 2, also known as Peacekeepers Way, a highway in Newfoundland, Canada

== See also ==
- Peacemaker (disambiguation)
