= Cape Cod Regional Law Enforcement Council =

The Cape Cod Regional Law Enforcement Council is a regional mutual aid facilitator formed by 43 police agencies in the area on or near Cape Cod, Massachusetts. It pools resources to provide SWAT, a Motor Vehicle Crash Reconstruction Team, a School Resource Officers’ Network and other units in the area.

A report from the ACLU of Massachusetts found that the CCRLEC was highly militarized and possessed a Lenco BearCat.

Agencies that belong to the group include:

- Barnstable Police Department
- Barnstable County Sheriff's Office
- Bourne Police Department
- Brewster Police Department
- Cape Cod Municipal Police Academy
- Chatham Police Department
- Dennis Police Department
- Eastham Police Department
- Falmouth Police Department
- Harwich Police Department
- Mashpee Police Department
- Nantucket Police Department
- Orleans Police Department
- Provincetown Police Department
- Sandwich Police Department
- Truro Police Department
- Wellfleet Police Department
- Yarmouth Police Department
