= Interventionism (politics) =

State interference in another's affairs

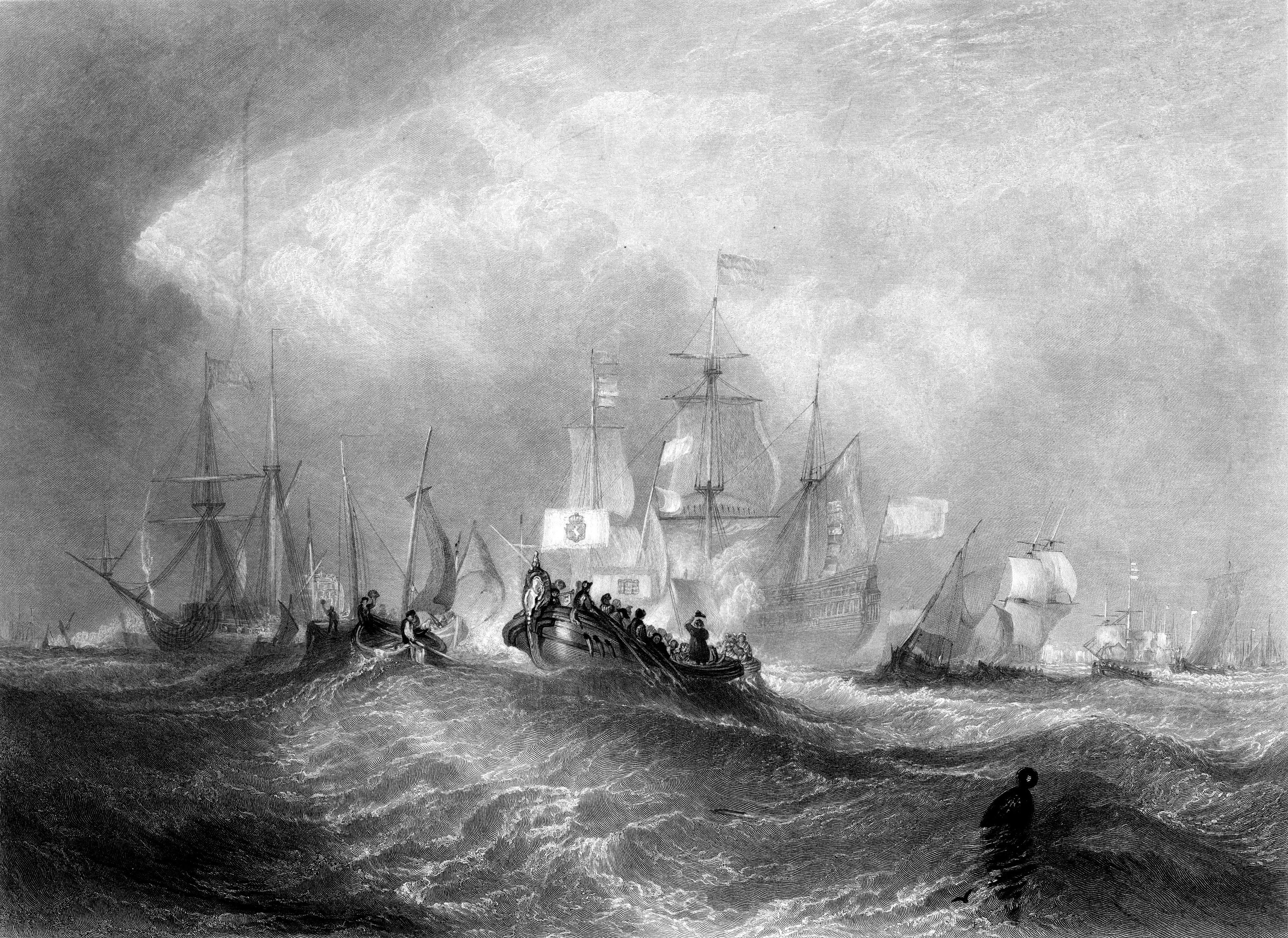
An illustration of William of Orange of the Dutch Republic landing at Brixham to depose James II of England during the Glorious Revolution in 1688

Interventionism, in international politics, is the interference of a state or group of states into the domestic affairs of another state for the purposes of coercing that state to do something or refrain from doing something. The intervention can be conducted through military force or economic coercion. A different term, economic interventionism, refers to government interventions into markets at home.

Military intervention, which is a common element of interventionism, has been defined by Martha Finnemore in the context of international relations as "the deployment of military personnel across recognized boundaries for the purpose of determining the political authority structure in the target state". Interventions may be solely focused on altering political authority structures, or may be conducted for humanitarian purposes, or for debt collection.

Interventionism has played a major role in the foreign policies of Western powers, particularly during and after the Victorian era. The New Imperialism era saw numerous interventions by Western nations in the Global South, including the Banana Wars. Modern interventionism grew out of Cold War policies, where the United States and the Soviet Union intervened in nations around the world to counter any influence held there by the other nation. Historians have noted that interventionism has always been a contentious political issue in the public opinion of countries which engaged in interventions.

According to a dataset by Alexander Downes, 120 leaders were removed through foreign-imposed regime change between 1816 and 2011. A 2016 study by Carnegie Mellon University political scientist Dov Haim Levin (who now teaches at the University of Hong Kong) found that the United States intervened in 81 foreign elections between 1946 and 2000, with the majority of those being through covert, rather than overt, actions. Multilateral interventions that include territorial governance by foreign institutions also include cases like East Timor and Kosovo, and have been proposed (but were rejected) for the Palestinian territories. A 2021 review of the existing literature found that foreign interventions since World War II tend to overwhelmingly fail in achieving their purported objectives.

== History ==
Interventionism has played a major role in the foreign policies of Western powers, particularly during and after the Victorian era. The New Imperialism era saw numerous interventions by Western nations in the Global South, including the Banana Wars. According to Hans J. Morgenthau, prohibitions on interventionism in the 19th century were intended to protect new nation-states from interference by long-standing, powerful monarchies. Modern interventionism grew out of Cold War policies, where the United States and the Soviet Union intervened in nations around the world to counter any influence held there by the other nation. Historians have noted that interventionism has always been a contentious political issue in the public opinion of countries which engaged in interventions.

== Foreign-imposed regime change ==
Studies by Alexander Downes, Lindsey O'Rourke, and Jonathan Monten indicate that foreign-imposed regime change seldom reduces the likelihood of civil war, violent removal of the newly imposed leader, and the probability of conflict between the intervening state and its adversaries, and does not increase the likelihood of democratization unless regime change comes with pro-democratic institutional changes in countries with favorable conditions for democracy. Downes argues:

The strategic impulse to forcibly oust antagonistic or non-compliant regimes overlooks two key facts. First, the act of overthrowing a foreign government sometimes causes its military to disintegrate, sending thousands of armed men into the countryside where they often wage an insurgency against the intervener. Second, externally-imposed leaders face a domestic audience in addition to an external one, and the two typically want different things. These divergent preferences place imposed leaders in a quandary: taking actions that please one invariably alienates the other. Regime change thus drives a wedge between external patrons and their domestic protégés or between protégés and their people.

Research by Nigel Lo, Barry Hashimoto, and Dan Reiter has contrasting findings, as they find that interstate "peace following wars last longer when the war ends in foreign-imposed regime change". However, research by Reiter and Goran Peic finds that foreign-imposed regime change can raise the probability of civil war.

== By country ==
=== China ===
The People's Republic of China has intervened in foreign countries on numerous occasions. Traditionally, official stances by China included a non-intervention approach, though as it became an emerging power, it has utilized intervention tactics.

=== Cuba ===
The small island nation of Cuba had impacts throughout the world.

Cuba intervened into numerous conflicts during the Cold War. The country sent medical and military aid into foreign countries to aid Socialist governments and rebel groups. These interventionist policies were controversial and resulted in isolation from many countries. Due to the ongoing Cold War, Cuba attempted make allies across Latin America and Africa. Cuba believed it had more freedom to intervene in Africa as the U.S. was more concerned about Latin America. Still, the US was strongly opposed to Cuban involvement in Africa and continued Cuban intervention was a major source of tension. Cuban intervention was often confidential and all Cuban doctors and soldiers were forced to keep their location confidential.

In Latin America, Cuba supported numerous rebel movements, including in Nicaragua, and in Bolivia where Che Guevara attempted to foment an insurgency. In 1959, Cuba unsuccessfully invaded Panama and the Dominican Republic. Within Africa, Cuba supported numerous independence movements, including in Angola, Guinea-Bissau, and Mozambique. Che Guevara also went to the Democratic Republic of the Congo (Zaire) to support the Simba rebellion. Cuba's largest foreign interventions were in Angola in support of the MPLA and in Ethiopia in support of Mengistu Haile Mariam during the Ogaden War. Cuba also intervened militarily in the Arab world including in Yemen, Algeria, Iraq, and in support of Syria during the October 1973 War. They also supported the People's Revolutionary Government during the United States invasion of Grenada. While most Cuban military interventions were Soviet-backed, Cuba often worked independently and at times even supported opposing sides. General Leopoldo Cintra Frías, who served in both Angola and Ethiopia, stated, "The Soviets were never able to control us although I think that was their intention on more than one occasion."

Cuban foreign policy was motivated by both idealism and realpolitik. It publicly justified its interventions into foreign conflicts for a number of reasons; to spread their revolutionary ideas, aid "liberation movements" fighting for independence, and to protect the territorial sovereignty of allied nations. Cuban leader Fidel Castro stated: "Our Revolution is not a revolution of millionaires. Instead, it is one carried out by the poor, and is one which dreams of ensuring the well-being not only of our own poor, but rather of all the poor in this world. And that is why we talk of internationalism." Cuba was the only economically lesser developed nation with extensive military intervention in Africa. Cuba was a strong supporter of the Organization for African Unity's emphasis on border protection and African independence.

Following the dissolution of the Soviet Union in 1991 and facing the economic difficulties during the Special Period, Cuba continued to maintain a presence in Africa, including the service of many doctors. Cuban medical internationalism was a prominent feature of their interventions alongside military aspects. Medical internationalism consisted of four prevailing approaches: emergency response medical teams sent overseas; establishment abroad of public health systems for providing free health care for local residents; taking in foreign patients to Cuba for free treatment; and providing medical training for foreigners, to Cuba and overseas. All Cuban doctors overseas were volunteers.

=== Egypt ===
Egypt has intervened in Libya.

=== Ethiopia ===
Ethiopia has intervened in Somalia.

=== France ===
France has intervened in Libya and in West Africa.

=== India ===
India has intervened in Sri Lanka.

=== Indonesia ===
Indonesia has intervened in East Timor.

=== Iran ===
Iran has intervened in Iraq and in Syria.

=== Nigeria ===
Nigeria has shown the will to intervene in the affairs of other sub Saharan African countries since independence. It is said that one of the reasons Yakubu Gowon was removed from office had been the squandering of Nigeria's resources in such far-away lands as Grenada and Guyana, with no returns, economic or political for Nigeria. The philosophy of subsequent military governments in Nigeria was that in an increasingly interdependent world, a country cannot be an island.

=== Russia ===
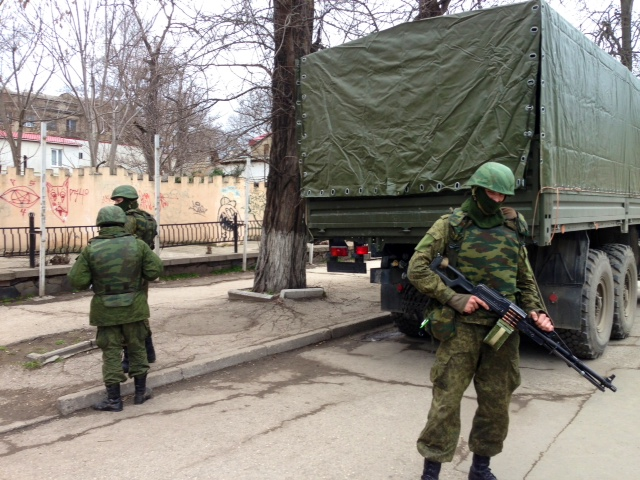
Soldiers without insignia in Crimea, 2014, referred to as "little green men"

Russia has used hybrid warfare to foster instability in other countries while avoiding all-out war.

Examples of Russian hybrid warfare include the use of unmarked soldiers, disinformation campaigns, sabotage, cyberwarfare, and fostering illegal immigration. Following the 2022 Russian invasion of Ukraine, reports of Russian hybrid warfare have increased significantly.

=== Saudi Arabia ===
Saudi Arabia has led interventions in Bahrain and in Yemen.

=== Soviet Union ===
Eastern Bloc

Over the course of its history, the Soviet Union intervened in foreign countries on numerous occasions.

=== Turkey ===
Turkey has intervened in Cyprus, in Libya and in Syria.

=== United Arab Emirates ===
The UAE has intervened in Sudan and in Yemen.

=== United Kingdom ===
Britain's history with interventionism dates back to the British Empire era, characterized by military and political involvement across Africa, South Asia, and the Middle East. As the Empire declined, Britain continued to intervene abroad throughout the 20th century, notably in the miscalculated Suez Crisis (1956) and controversial counterinsurgency campaign known as the Malayan Emergency (1948–1960). In the post-Cold War period, the UK intervened among others in the Gulf War (1991), Bosnia, Kosovo (1999), and Sierra Leone (2000) as part of NATO operations and UN mandates. Following the September 11 attacks, the UK joined the US-led coalition in Afghanistan (2001) and Iraq (2003) under Prime Minister Tony Blair, the latter proving highly controversial domestically. The UK also played a leading role in the 2011 military intervention in Libya under UN Security Council Resolution 1973, while also providing military training and assistance across Africa, including Mali and Somalia.

=== United States ===
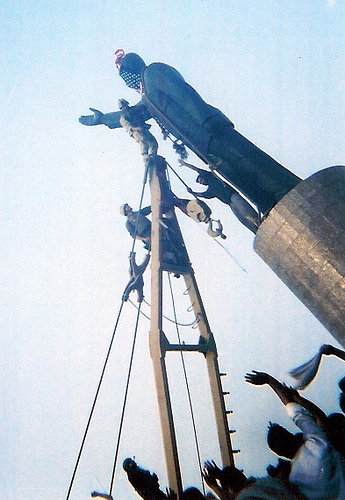
U.S. Marines raise the U.S. flag over Saddam Hussein's statue during the 2003 Iraq War.

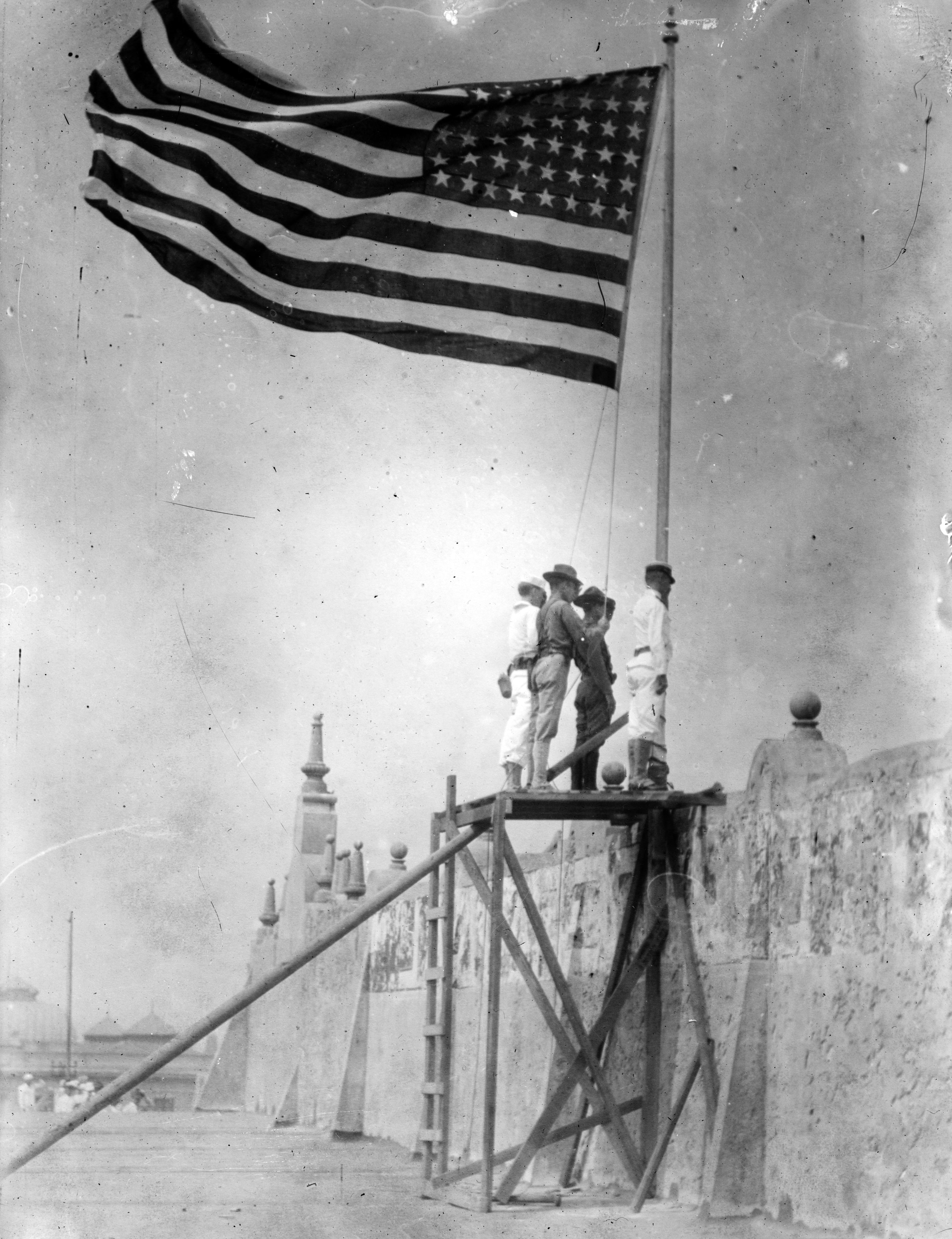
U.S. Marines raise the U.S. flag over Veracruz, Mexico during the Banana Wars.

The United States has been involved in hundreds of interventions in foreign countries throughout its history, engaging in nearly 500 military interventions between 1776 and 2026, with half of these operations occurring since 1950 and over 25% occurring in the post-Cold War period. Common objectives of U.S. foreign interventions have historically revolved around economic opportunity, protection of U.S. citizens and diplomats, territorial expansion, counterterrorism, fomenting regime change and nation-building, promoting democracy, providing aid and enforcing international law. There have been two dominant ideologies in the United States regarding foreign policy—interventionism, which encourages economic, political and military intervention in the affairs of foreign countries—and isolationism, which discourages these.

The 19th century formed the roots of United States foreign interventionism, which at the time was largely driven by economic opportunities in the Pacific and Spanish-held Latin America along with the Monroe Doctrine, which saw the U.S. seek a policy to resist European colonialism in the Western Hemisphere. The 20th century saw the U.S. intervene in two world wars in which American forces fought alongside their allies in international campaigns against Imperial Japan, Imperial and Nazi Germany, and their respective allies. The aftermath of World War II resulted in a foreign policy of containment aimed at preventing the spread of world communism. The ensuing Cold War resulted in the Truman, Eisenhower, Kennedy, Carter, and Reagan Doctrines, all of which saw the U.S. engage in espionage, regime change, proxy wars, and other clandestine activity internationally against affiliates and puppet regimes of the Soviet Union. The Nixon Doctrine reaffirmed the nuclear umbrella but wanted U.S. allies to be self-dependent, as exemplified by Vietnamization.

After the Soviet Union collapsed in 1991, the U.S. emerged as the world's sole superpower and, with this, maintained interventionist policies in Africa, Eastern Europe, and the Middle East. Following the September 11 attacks in 2001, the Bush administration launched the "war on terror" in which the U.S. waged international counterterrorism campaigns against various extremist groups—such as al-Qaeda and the Islamic State—in various countries. The Bush Doctrine of preemptive war saw the U.S. invade Afghanistan in 2001 and Iraq in 2003. In addition, the U.S. expanded its military presence in Africa and Asia via status of forces agreements and a revamped policy of foreign internal defense.

The Obama administration's Pivot to Asia strategy sought to refocus U.S. geopolitical efforts from counter-insurgencies in the Middle East to bolstering U.S. influence in East and Southeast Asia, reinforcing the first island chain and countering China's rising influence and perceived expansionism in the South China Sea —a trajectory continued by the Trump (2017–2021, 2025–present) and Biden administrations under the Free and Open Indo-Pacific (FOIP) strategy. The second Trump administration introduced the Trump Corollary to the Monroe Doctrine, aiming to consolidate U.S. dominance in the Western Hemisphere and prevent Chinese, Russian and other adversarial powers from meddling in "America's backyard." In January 2026, the U.S. intervened in Venezuela, capturing President Nicolas Maduro and constraining his government. The next month, the United States and Israel jointly attacked Iran, killing Iranian supreme leader Ali Khamenei and other Iranian leaders, sparking the ongoing 2026 Iran war.

The United States Navy serves as a key element of United States global power projection and its ability to conduct foreign interventions. As a blue-water navy, it has been involved in anti-piracy activity in international and foreign territory throughout its history, from the Barbary Wars to combating modern piracy off the coast of Somalia and other regions. The United States Air Force's strategic airlift and global strike capabilities alongside clandestine activity by special operations units are two other major components in U.S. hard power projection.

== See also ==
- Allied intervention in the Russian Civil War
- Counterinsurgency
- Democracy promotion
- Economic sanctions
- Embargo
- Exporting the revolution
- Foreign involvement in the Syrian Civil War
- Gunboat diplomacy
- Global policeman
- Humanitarian intervention
- War against the Islamic State
- International isolation
- International relations theory
- Isolationism
- Liberal hawk
- Liberal internationalism
- Military occupation
- Multilateralism
- Neoconservatism
- Non-interventionism
- Pacification
- Peacekeeping
- Peace enforcement
- Peacemaker
- Peace makers
- Peacemaking
- Police action
- Sakoku
- Unilateralism
- War hawk
- White man's burden
