= Lenko =

Lenko is a given name and surname. Notable people with the name include:

== Given name ==
- Lenko Grčić (1925–1999), Croatian footballer and coach
- Lenko Latkov (1975–2003), Bulgarian serial-killer

== Surname ==
- Jiří Lenko (born 1985), Czech footballer
- Joanna Lenko (born 1992), Canadian ice-dancer

== See also ==
- Lenco (disambiguation)
- Lenkov
