= Lenco =

Lenco may refer to:

- Lenco Turntables, an audio equipment company
- Lenco BearCat, an armored assault vehicle made by Lenco Industries

== See also ==
- Lenko (disambiguation)
