= Peacemaker =

Peacemaker or The Peacemaker may refer to:

== Individuals and groups ==
- UN Peacemaker, a project of the UN to support international peacemakers and mediators
- Peace makers, a list of contemporary individuals and organizations involved in peacemaking
- Peacemakers, an American pacifist organization
- Great Peacemaker, the traditional founder of the Haudenosaunee confederacy
- "The Peacemakers", the title of the 1993 Time Person of the Year, referring to and represented by Yasser Arafat, Yitzhak Rabin, F.W. de Klerk, and Nelson Mandela
- Edward VII, called the "Peacemaker"
- Alexander III of Russia, called the "Peacemaker"
- Conservator of the peace
- Peacemaker (Thai band)

== Arts, literature and entertainment ==
=== Film and television ===
- The Peacemaker (1997 film), an action film directed by Mimi Leder, starring George Clooney and Nicole Kidman
- Peacemaker (1990 film), a science fiction film directed by Kevin S. Tenney
- The Peacemaker (1956 film), a Western film directed by Ted Post, starring James Mitchell
- The Peacemaker (1922 film), a British silent drama film
- Peacemakers (TV series), a 2003 TV series starring Tom Berenger
- Peacemaker (TV series), a 2022 TV series starring John Cena

=== Literature and printed media ===
- Peace Maker (pamphlet), an 1842 pamphlet advocating polygamy
- Peacemaker (novel), a 2007 novel by James Swallow
- Peacemaker (C. J. Cherryh novel), a 2014 novel set in C. J. Cherryh's Foreigner universe
- The Peacemaker (newspaper), a pacifist newspaper published in Australia from 1939 to 1971
- The Peacemaker (novel), a 1934 novel by C. S. Forester
- "The Peacemaker" (short story), a 1983 Nebula award-winning short story by Gardner Dozois
- The Peacemaker, a 1618 anti-duelling pamphlet by Thomas Middleton
- Peacemakers (book), a 2001 book by Margaret MacMillan
- Peacemakers Manual, a 2007 book by Egon Ranshofen-Wertheimer
- Peacemaker (character), the name of multiple superhero comic book characters from DC Comics
- Peacemaker Kurogane, a manga and 2003 anime

=== Music ===
- Roger Clyne and the Peacemakers, a rock music band

==== Albums ====
- The Peacemaker (1998), and The Peacemaker 2 (2004), albums by hip hop DJ Tony Touch
- Peace Maker, an album by Eamon McGrath
- Peacemaker (Texas Hippie Coalition album), 2012, or the title song
- Peacemaker (Vera Sola album), 2024

==== Songs ====
- "Peacemaker", a Karl L. King song
- "Peacemaker", a song by power metal band Sonata Arctica
- "Peacemaker", a song on Iced Earth's 2014 album Plagues of Babylon
- "Peacemaker", a song on Green Day's 2009 album 21st Century Breakdown
- "The Peacemaker", a 1973 song by Albert Hammond

=== Visual fine art ===
- The Peacemakers, an 1868 painting by George Peter Alexander Healy
- The Peacemakers (mural), a mural created by the Bruton sisters for the 1939 Golden Gate International Exposition in San Francisco

== Weapons ==
- Colt Single Action Army, a handgun
- An early name for the LGM-118 Peacekeeper, or MX Missile
- A cannon that exploded aboard the USS Princeton

=== Other media ===
- Peacemaker (Transformers), a character in the Transformers franchise
- PeaceMaker, a 2007 video game designed to promote peace in the Middle East
- SS Empire Peacemaker
- Myrotvorets (Peacemaker), a Ukrainian website which reveals personal information of people who are considered to be "enemies of Ukraine"

== Vehicles ==
- Peacemaker (ship), a 1989 Class-A tall ship (barquentine rig)
- Peacemaker, a submarine designed in the 1880s by Josiah Tuck
- Convair B-36 Peacemaker, a bomber aircraft

== See also ==
- Peacekeeper (disambiguation)
