= Cadillac Gage Peacekeeper II =

- Type: Armoured personnel carrier
- Place of origin: United States

Production history
- Designer: Textron Marine and Land Systems
- Manufacturer: Textron Marine and Land Systems
- Unit cost: $170,000
- Produced: 2003–?

Specifications
- Mass: 6,800 kg (15,000 lb)
- Length: 5.13 m
- Width: 2.59 m (w/ running boards) 2.01 m (w/o running boards)
- Height: 2.46 m (w/ cupola) 1.98 m (w/o cupola)
- Crew: 1
- Passengers: 7
- Armor: 12.7 mm steel
- Main armament: 1x general-purpose machine gun or automatic grenade launcher (optional)
- Engine: Vortec 8.1-liter gas V8/Duramax diesel 340 bhp/300 bhp
- Suspension: torsion bar
- Maximum speed: 112.5 km/h (road)

The Cadillac Gage Peacekeeper II is a four-wheeled armored personnel carrier marketed as an internal security vehicle, produced by Textron Marine & Land Systems. Per its name, it is the successor to the Cadillac Gage Ranger, which was alternatively known as the Cadillac Gage Peacekeeper. Built on a Ford F-350 chassis, the Peacekeeper II was unveiled in 2003 and, like its predecessor, was designed for militaries as an internal security and military police vehicle, as well as for law enforcement as a SWAT vehicle, though it was less popular.

The Cadillac Gage Peacekeeper II is no longer offered by Textron, with trademarks cancelled, though it is unclear when it was discontinued. It was developed at a unit cost of approximately US$170,000.

== History ==
In 2002, Textron representatives announced the Peacekeeper II was in development at the Law Enforcement Tactical Response Show & Conference (TREXPO) East exhibition in August 2002. The following year, a working production model was displayed at TREXPO West in March 2003.

In 2018, the 509th Logistics Readiness Squadron at Whiteman Air Force Base acquired and refurbished a Peacekeeper II for static display purposes.

== Design ==
The Peacekeeper II is powered by a 340 bhp (250 kW) V8 gas engine. Optionally, this can be replaced with a 300 bhp (220 kW) diesel engine. It uses a front-engine, four-wheel-drive layout coupled to an Allison automatic transmission, and also features power steering and a torsion bar suspension. It can reach a maximum speed of 70 mph (112.5 km/h).

Externally, the Peacekeeper II resembles its predecessor, but notably eschews the older-style circular headlights for modernized headlights resembling those on the first generation Chevrolet Silverado, and has a larger distinctive grille, among other aesthetic changes. The Peacekeeper II is equipped with 0.5-inch (13 mm) thick armor and can withstand up to 7.62 mm armor-piercing ammunition. Large windows made of bulletproof glass and eight view vision blocks in the rear cabin are provided for visibility. The Peacekeeper II is also equipped with run-flat tires.

The Peacekeeper II can carry one driver, one front passenger, and six rear passengers. Bucket seats are provided for the driver and front passenger, while bench seats are provided for the rear cabin. Foldable running boards with handrails are included on the sides and rear of the vehicle, allowing for more personnel to hang onto the exterior of the vehicle. The interior is fully insulated and is equipped with air conditioning and heaters.

Weapons are installed on a 180°-rotatable top-mounted gun turret cupola that allows for the mounting of a general-purpose machine gun or automatic grenade launcher, though law enforcement configurations typically exclude this. Additionally, eight firing ports are located below each of the vision blocks for the vehicle's occupants to fire weapons and dispense devices such as smoke grenades with minimal risk.
