= Lenco BearCat =

American non-military armored vehicle

BearCat
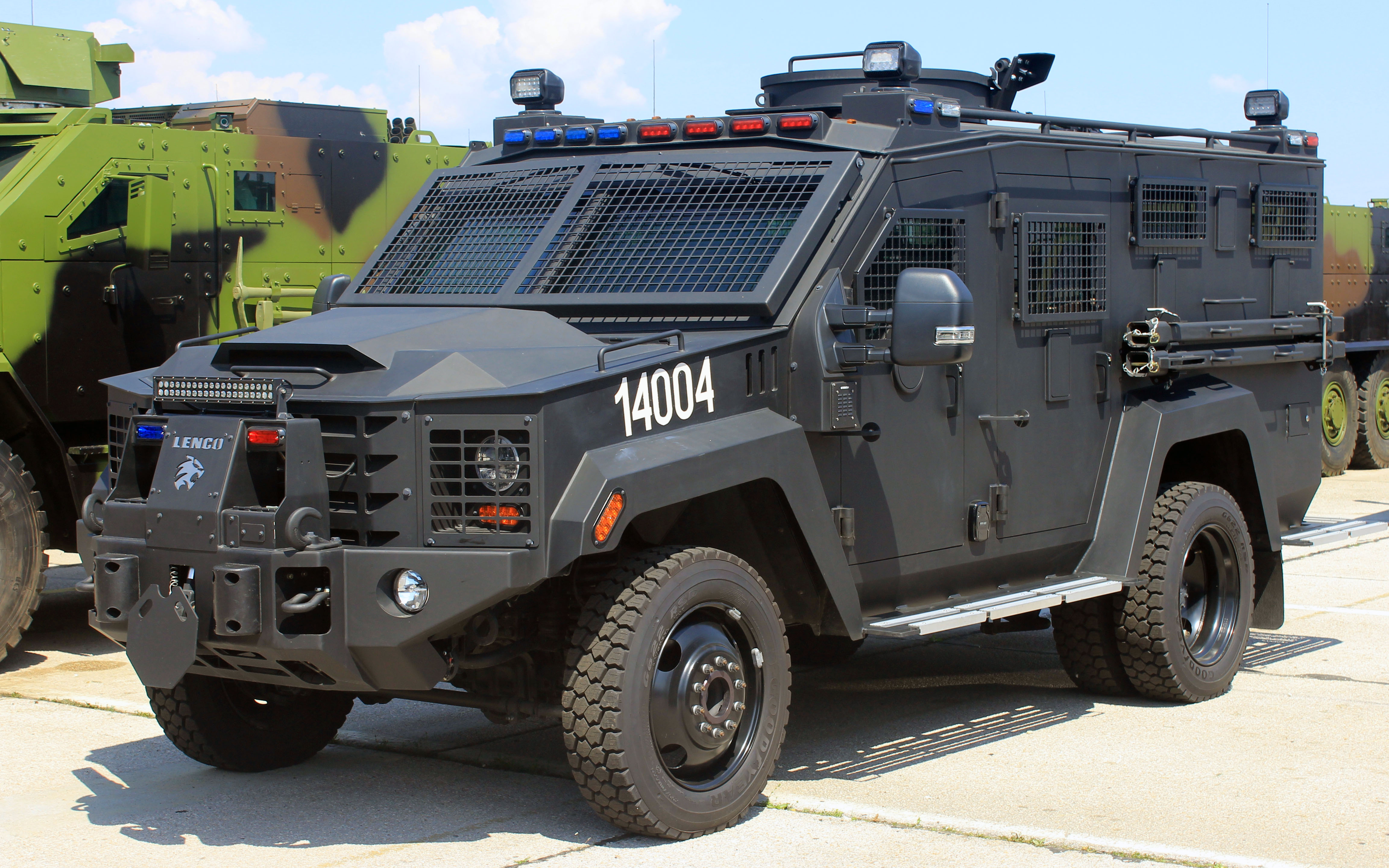
- A Lenco BearCat G2 operated by the Serbian Armed Forces military police
- Type: Non-military armored vehicle
- Place of origin: United States

Service history
- In service: 2001–present
- Used by: See § Operators

Production history
- Designed: 2001
- Manufacturer: Lenco Industries
- Unit cost: US$188,793–300,000
- Produced: 2001–present
- Variants: See § Variants

Specifications
- Mass: 17,550 lb (7,961 kg)
- Length: 240 in (6,096 mm)
- Width: 120 in (3,048 mm)
- Height: 144 in (3,658 mm)
- Crew: 2 + 10 passengers
- Armor: 0.5–1.5 in (13–38 mm) steel plate (NIJ Type IV+)
- Main armament: Weapon mountable rotating roof hatch
- Secondary armament: Multiple side gun ports
- Engine: 6.7 L Ford Power Stroke turbo-diesel V8; 440 hp (328 kW) @ 2,800 rpm
- Transmission: Ford 6R140 6-speed automatic
- Suspension: Live axle
- Maximum speed: 90 mph (145 km/h)

The Lenco BearCat is a wheeled internal security vehicle designed for law enforcement, military, and paramilitary use, produced by Lenco Industries. Introduced in 2001 as an offshoot of (and later successor to) the larger Lenco BEAR, the BearCat is used by numerous law enforcement agencies and military units across the world.

== History ==
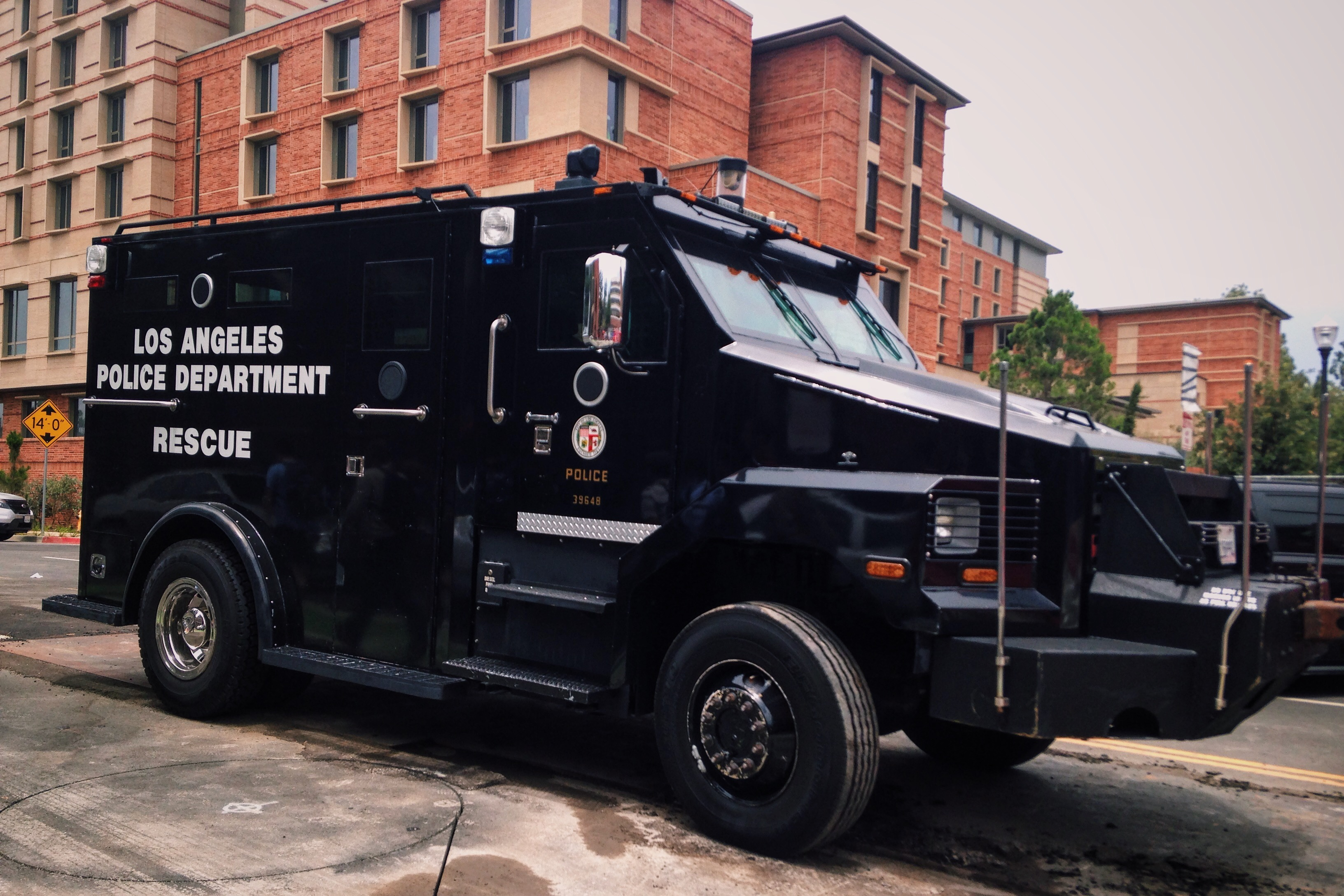
A Lenco BEAR, the larger predecessor to the BearCat, operated by the Los Angeles Police Department

Lenco Industries, doing business as Lenco Armored Vehicles, is an American armored vehicle manufacturer based in Pittsfield, Massachusetts, established in 1981. As of the early 2010s, Lenco has produced more than 5,000 armored vehicles for use in more than 40 countries worldwide.

Prior to the introduction of the Lenco BEAR and BearCat, dedicated police armored vehicles did not exist; most tactical units in the late 20th century used unarmored vans and multi-stop trucks, repurposed armored transport trucks, or armored personnel carriers and armored cars acquired from military surplus, none of which were specifically designed and equipped for law enforcement applications. One of the closest analogues to the BearCat at the time was the Cadillac Gage Ranger, a small internal security vehicle designed for military police that was sold to civilian police through surplus sales and the Law Enforcement Support Office. While the BEAR was released in 2000 to address this niche, it was based on a Freightliner truck chassis and was rather large.

The first BearCat was designed and completed in August 2001 as a smaller spin-off of the BEAR, with input from the Los Angeles County Sheriff's Department's Special Enforcement Bureau as an updated and improved version of their military surplus Cadillac Gage Rangers.

== Usage ==
In law enforcement use, BearCats are generally considered "armored rescue vehicles", with their primary use being to transport police tactical unit officers to and from hostile situations and to help extract civilians, officers, and casualties who may be stuck in the area. To suit this purpose, the BearCat is designed to protect its occupants from a variety of small arms and explosive weapons. The BearCat can also be fitted with aftermarket tactical equipment such as a battering ram, an armored turret, or CS gas dispensers to be used for offensive purposes (i.e. to provide moving cover during a shootout or breach a building during a raid or standoff).

Since their introduction, BearCats have been credited with saving lives in armed confrontations on numerous occasions, including by stopping 7.62 mm caliber rounds fired at officers during a shootout in Athens, Texas in 2010; blocking "high-powered rifle" fire that penetrated regular police cars in Bucks County, Pennsylvania in 2012; protecting sheriff's deputies from rifle fire during a shootout in Oklahoma County, Oklahoma in 2015; being used as a weapon during a shootout in Kern County, California in 2026; and assisting intervention operations during mass shootings such as the 2015 Colorado Springs Planned Parenthood shooting and the 2016 Pulse nightclub shooting.

Lenco had the largest contract with U.S. Immigration and Customs Enforcement (ICE) in Massachusetts in 2025. According to Boston.com, Lenco Industries has "scored $5.2 million in contracts since last year, and its BearCat's 'militarized aesthetic' has been a visual centerpiece in some ICE operations". The Berkshire Eagle reported that demonstrators as well as local and state officials have called on Lenco Industries to refuse future contracts with ICE.

== Design ==
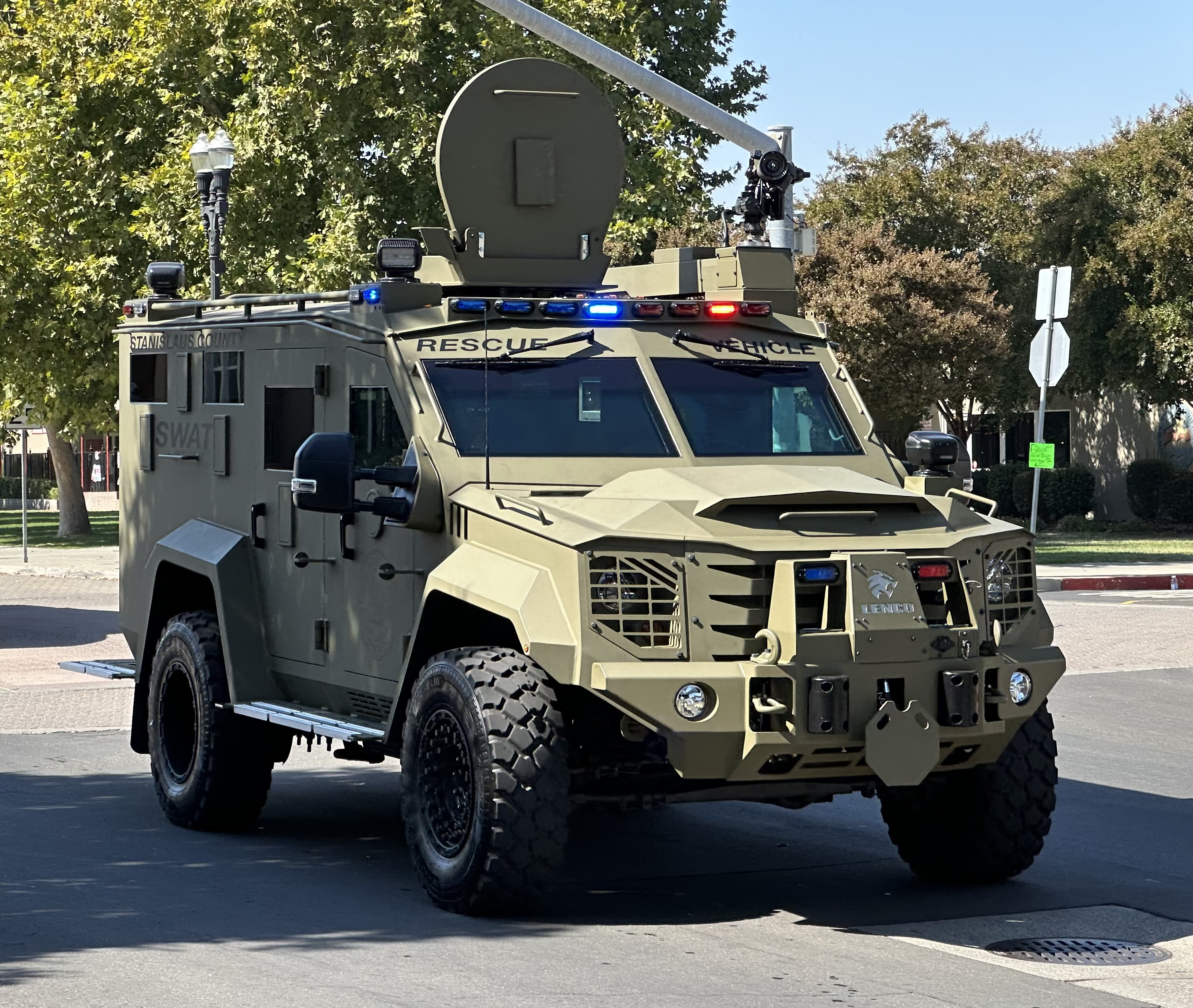
A newer-model BearCat with an armored roof hatch operated by the Stanislaus County Sheriff's Department

The BearCat is based on a Ford F-550 Super Duty commercial truck chassis with two available engines (the V10 Triton Gasoline and the 6.7L Turbo Diesel) and a six-speed automatic transmission. The BearCat features 0.5–1.5-inch-thick armored steel bodywork, completed with .50 BMG-rated bulletproof glass capable of surviving multiple hits, and blast-resistant flooring.

The BearCat is designed to be customizable with a variety of non-standard features and aftermarket equipment depending on the customer's requirements, including:

- Emergency vehicle lighting
- Emergency vehicle equipment
- A roof hatch for a man-operated gun turret, a CROWS turret, or an unarmed elevated lookout point, with or without bulletproof glass panels and blast shields
- A Mobile Adjustable Ramp System (MARS), an adjustable and retractable top-mounted platform that effectively transforms the vehicle into a modernized siege tower
- A bullbar-mounted battering ram
- Gun ports
- Running boards
- Electric winches
- Protection against chemical, biological, radiological, nuclear and explosive threats
- CS gas deployment nozzles
- Radiation detection systems
- A backup camera
- Thermographic camera systems
- Floodlights and spotlights

=== Variants ===
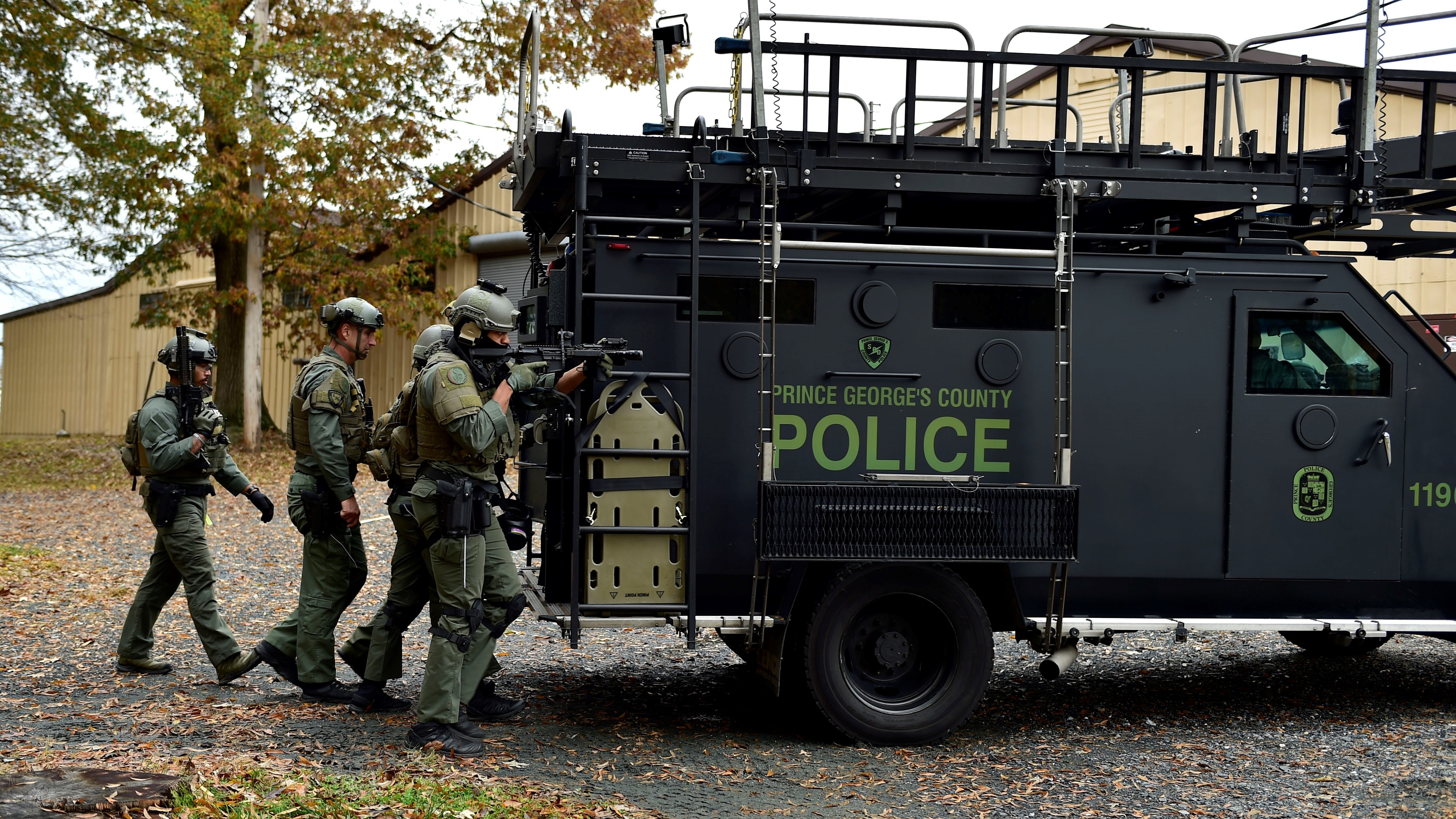
A BearCat Elevated Tactics variant operated by the Prince George's County Police Department

There are numerous variants of the BearCat designed for specific purposes or customers. As of 2025, these are the:

- G2 – Base variant for law enforcement
- G3 – Off-road variant for law enforcement
- G4 – Armored military-oriented all-terrain vehicle
- G5 – Improved all-terrain military variant. Includes underbody V-hull for mine protection, blast-attenuating seats and weapons integration including remote weapon station.
- X3 – Double-cab pickup variant of the G3
- BombCat/EOD – Bomb disposal variant designed to accommodate a remote-control vehicle
- MedCat/Medevac – Medical evacuation variant equipped with medical litters, oxygen tanks, a lighted work station, and dedicated compartments for medical supplies, akin to an armored ambulance
- FireCat – Firefighting variant of the X3, featuring an armored water tank and a roof-mounted fire hose similar to a water cannon
- SUV – Lower-profile security version designed to be similar to an SUV or passenger van, featuring bulletproof glass windows and removing overt features such as the roof hatch and bullbar
- Elevated Tactics – BearCat with a MARS system installed
- LandCat – A slightly taller and slimmer variant built on a Toyota Land Cruiser 70 series chassis designed for confined urban areas or off-road responses, with a smaller capacity (8 occupants as opposed to 12 for most other variants)
- Rail Rescue Vehicle – Road-rail variant operated by the MARTA Police Department

== Operators ==
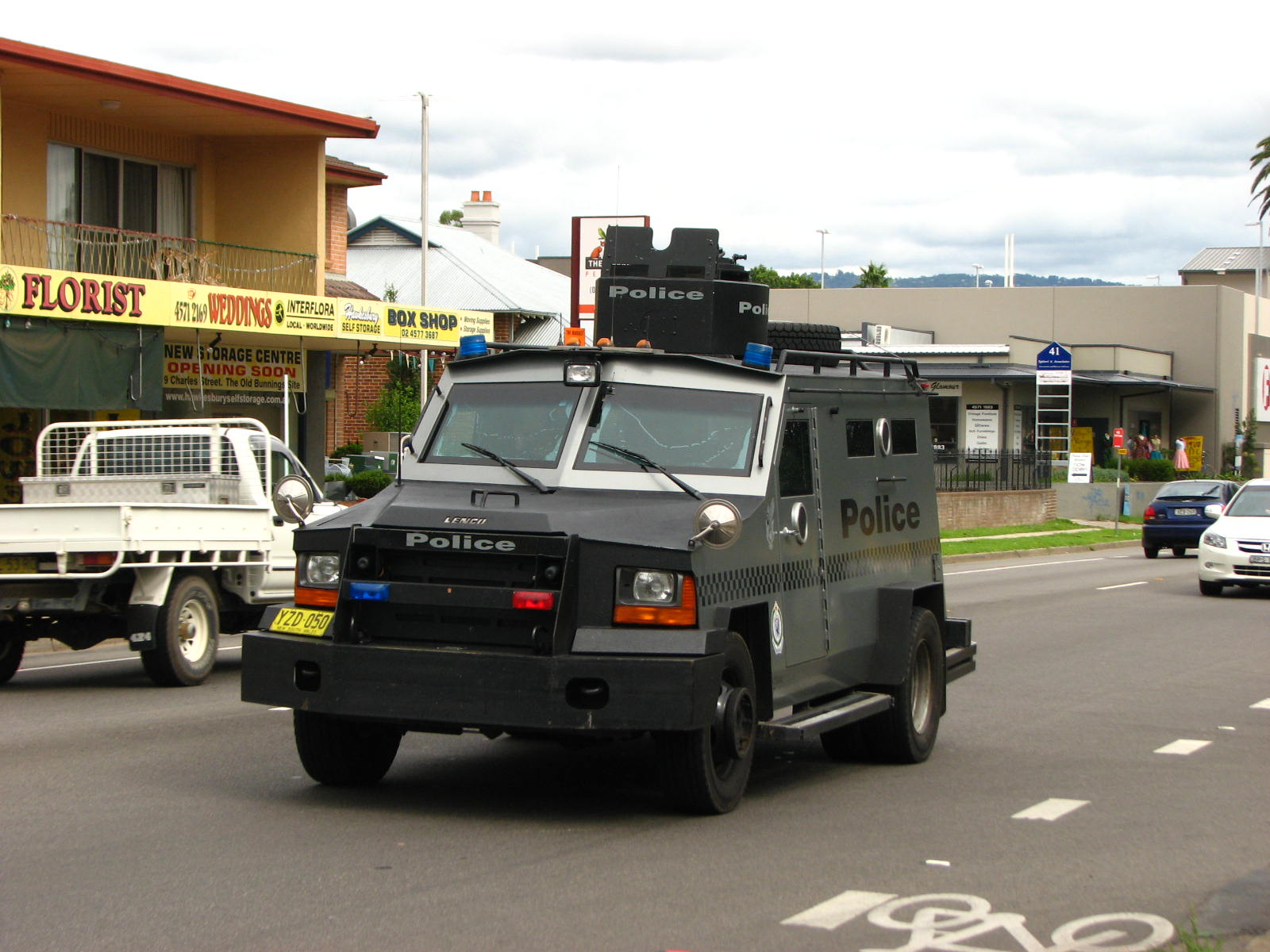
An early-model BearCat operated by the New South Wales Police Force

Australia

- Australian Federal Police – Australian National Counter Terrorism Committee and Specialist Response Group
- New South Wales Police Force – In 2025, five new BearCats were acquired bringing the fleet to six BearCats; the full-time Tactical Operations Unit (TOU) has x2 including 1 with an extendable ramp; x4 are based around the state of NSW for use by the TOU and the part-time Tactical Operations Regional Support (TORS).
- Northern Territory Police – Territory Response Group
- Queensland Police Service – The state has 3 active-use BearCats with an additional announced in 2023, 2 are operated by the Special Emergency Response Team (SERT) with one in Brisbane and one in Cairns along with an EOD variant (BombCat) used by the Explosive Ordnance Response Team (EORT) in brisbane.
- South Australia Police – Special Tasks and Rescue Group
- Tasmania Police – Special Operations Group
- Victoria Police – Special Operations Group ×2 (2018 variant) and Critical Incident Response Team x1 (2013 variant)
- Western Australia Police – Tactical Response Group ×2

Belgium

- Antwerp Local Police

Brazil

- Military Police of Goiás State – Batalhão de Operações Especiais

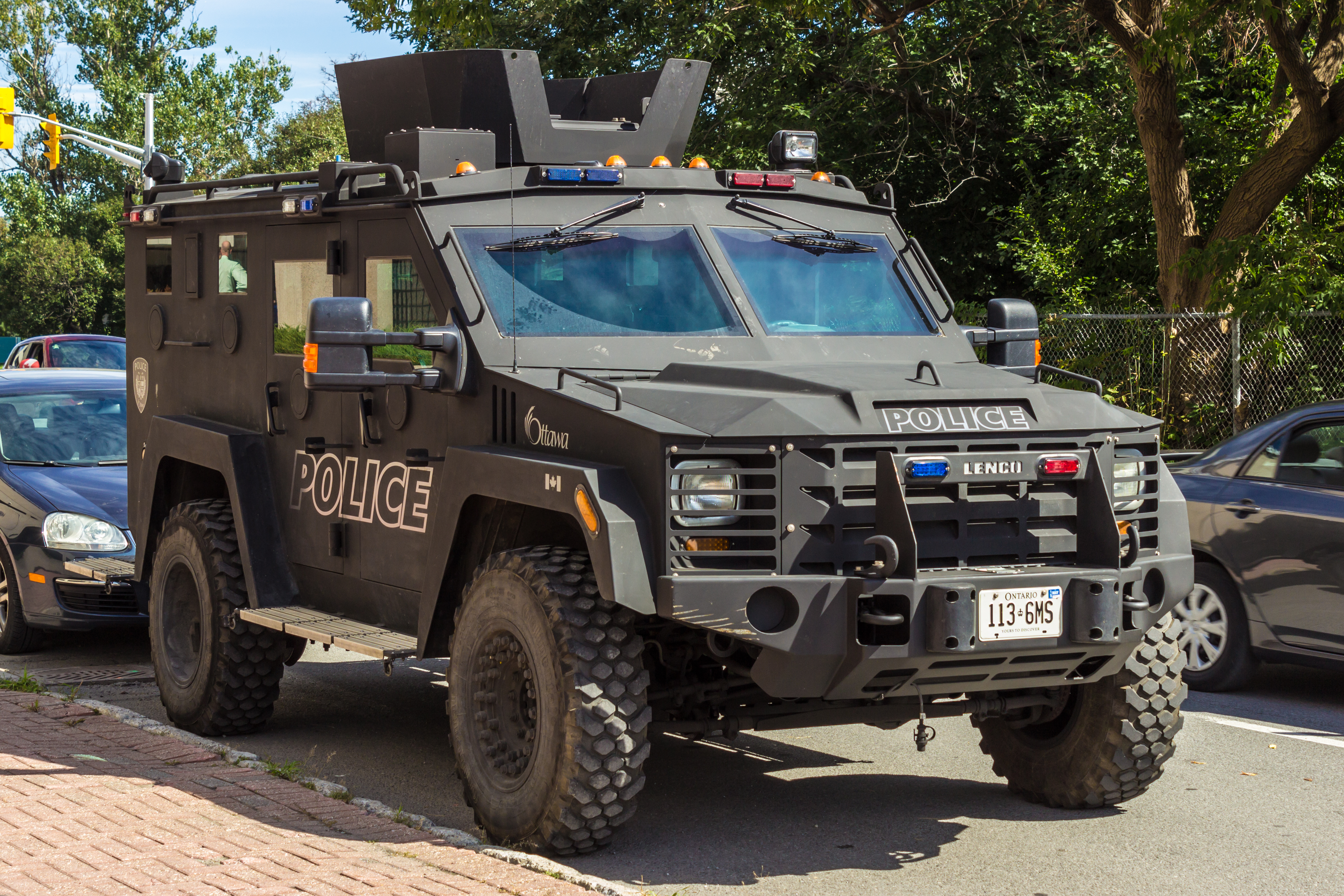
A BearCat G3 operated by the Ottawa Police Service

Canada

- Ottawa Police Service – Tactical Unit
- Saskatoon Police Service – Emergency Response Team

Denmark

- Politiets Aktionsstyrke

Hungary

- Counter Terrorism Centre

Jamaica

- Jamaica Constabulary Force - Two units in need of repair as of 2026.

Morocco

- Moroccan Auxiliary Forces – 88 BearCat armored vehicles in riot control, troop transport, communications, convoy protection, and SWAT variants.
- BCIJ (Bureau Central d'Investigations Judiciaires), Moroccan Domestic Intelligence Unit & Special Forces.

Netherlands

- National Police Corps - Multiple Lenco BEARs and Lenco BearCats in service with the Dienst Speciale Interventies (Special Intervention Service). A police service consisting of both military and police personnel, specialized in counter-terrorism ops, apprehension of high-value or high-risk individuals, aircraft hijackings and hostage situations. Also includes operators belonging to M-Squadron of NLMARSOF, special operations forces of the Netherlands Marine Corps, under DSI command for domestic counter-terrorism operations on Dutch soil, specialized in large-scale and complex interventions.

Pakistan

- Balochistan Police

Serbia

- Serbian Armed Forces - Military Police

South Korea

- National Police Agency (South Korea) - Korea National Police Special Operation Unit

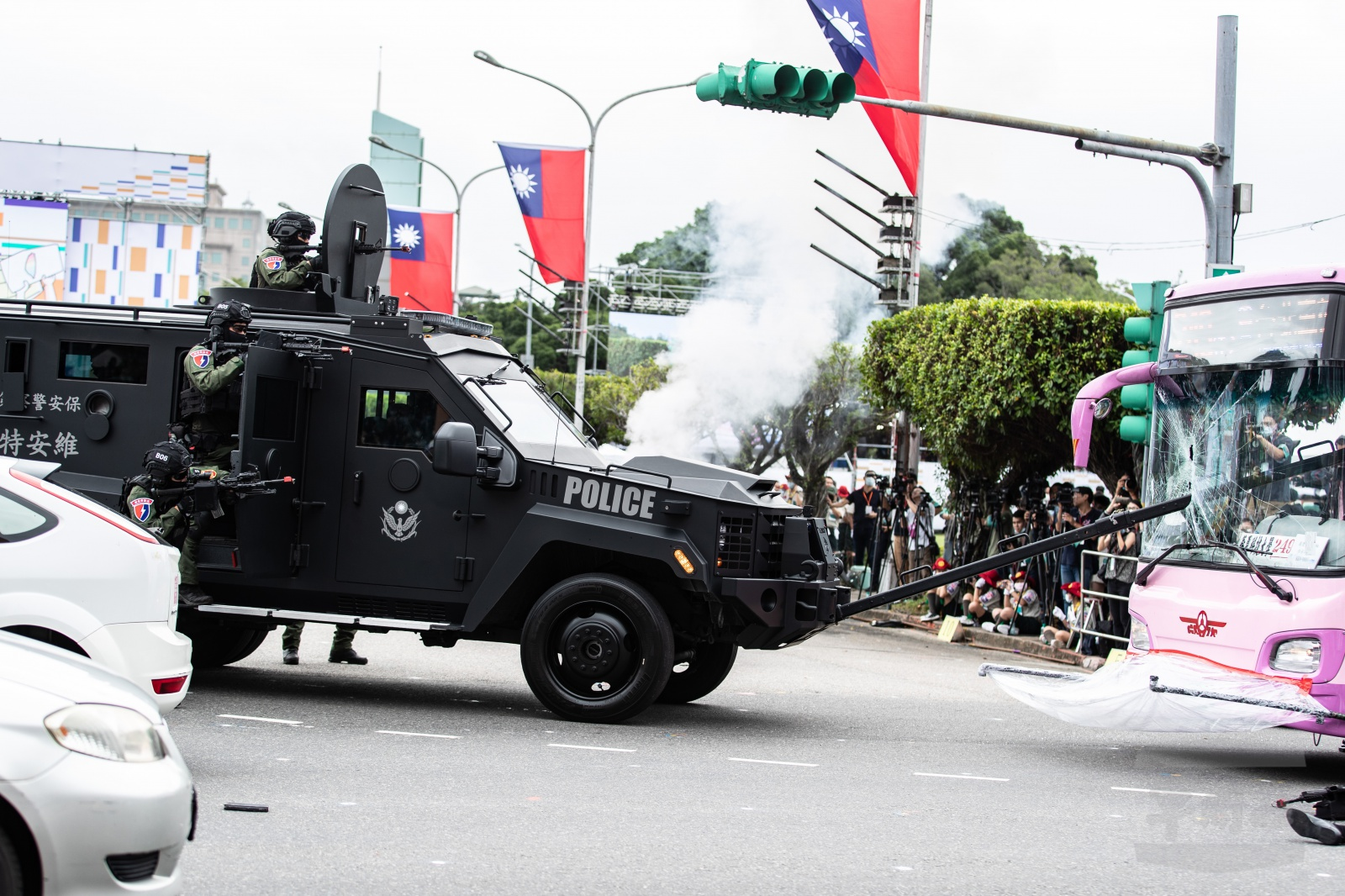
A BearCat operated by the National Police Agency of Taiwan

Taiwan

- National Police Agency (Taiwan) - National Police Agency Special Operations Group

United Kingdom

- Police Service of Northern Ireland - Counter Terrorism Unit/Hostage Rescue

United States

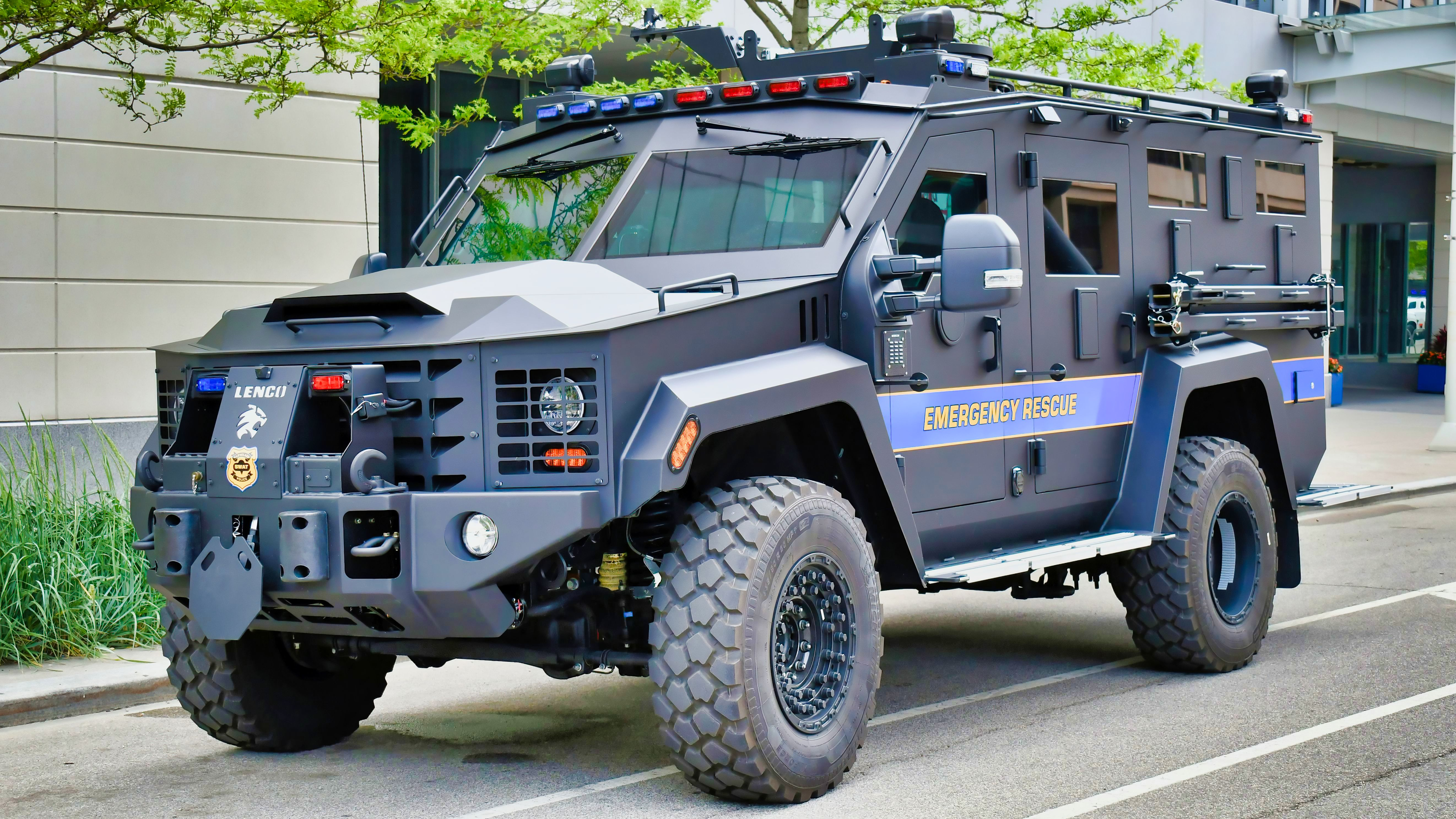
A BearCat G3 operated by the Cleveland Division of Police

Federal

- Federal Bureau of Investigation – Special Weapons and Tactics Teams
- United States Department of Energy Over 80 Lenco BearCats on (8) DoE Sites
- United States Immigration and Customs Enforcement
  - Enforcement Removal Operations (ERO) – Special Response Teams
  - Homeland Security Investigations (HSI) – Special Response Teams
- United States Park Police
- Kennedy Space Center – Emergency Response Team

State/Local

A considerable number of state police, sheriff's offices, and municipal police agencies in the United States operate BearCats for their tactical units, with over 500 BearCats in use across the country in 2013. These agencies include:

- Alaska State Troopers
- Chicago Police Department
- Cleveland Division of Police
- Dallas Police Department
- Denver Police Department
- Des Moines Police Department
- Honolulu Police Department
- Kansas Highway Patrol
- Louisiana State Police
- Los Angeles County Sheriff's Department
- Los Angeles Police Department
- Miami-Dade Sheriff's Office
- New Mexico State Police
- New York City Police Department
- Pasadena Police Department
- Portland Police Bureau
- Prince George's County Sheriff's Office
- Prince William County Police Department
- Unified Police Department of Greater Salt Lake
- San Diego Police Department
- San Francisco Police Department
- Santa Barbara Police Department
- St. Louis Metropolitan Police Department
- St. Petersburg Police Department

Military

- United States Air Force – Air Force Security Forces
- United States Air Force – 60 BearCats for convoy protection
- United States Marine Corps – Marine Corps Security Force Regiment
- United States Army – Military Police Corps Special Reaction Teams
  - Fort Carson
  - Fort Hood
  - Fort Riley
  - Fort Bragg
  - Camp Carroll
- United States Navy Strategic Weapons Facilities Pacific/Atlantic – Over 100

=== Non-state actors ===
- Syrian Democratic Forces

== Gallery ==
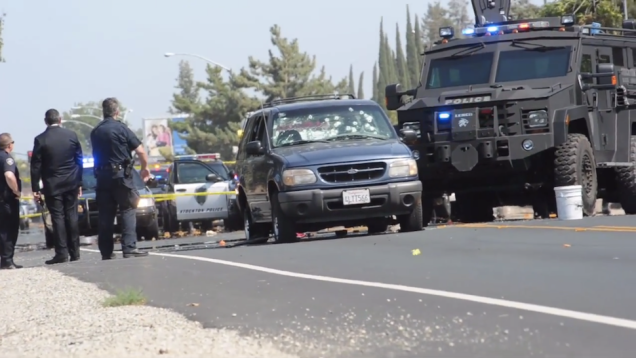
A BearCat used by the Stockton Police Department in the 2014 Stockton bank robbery

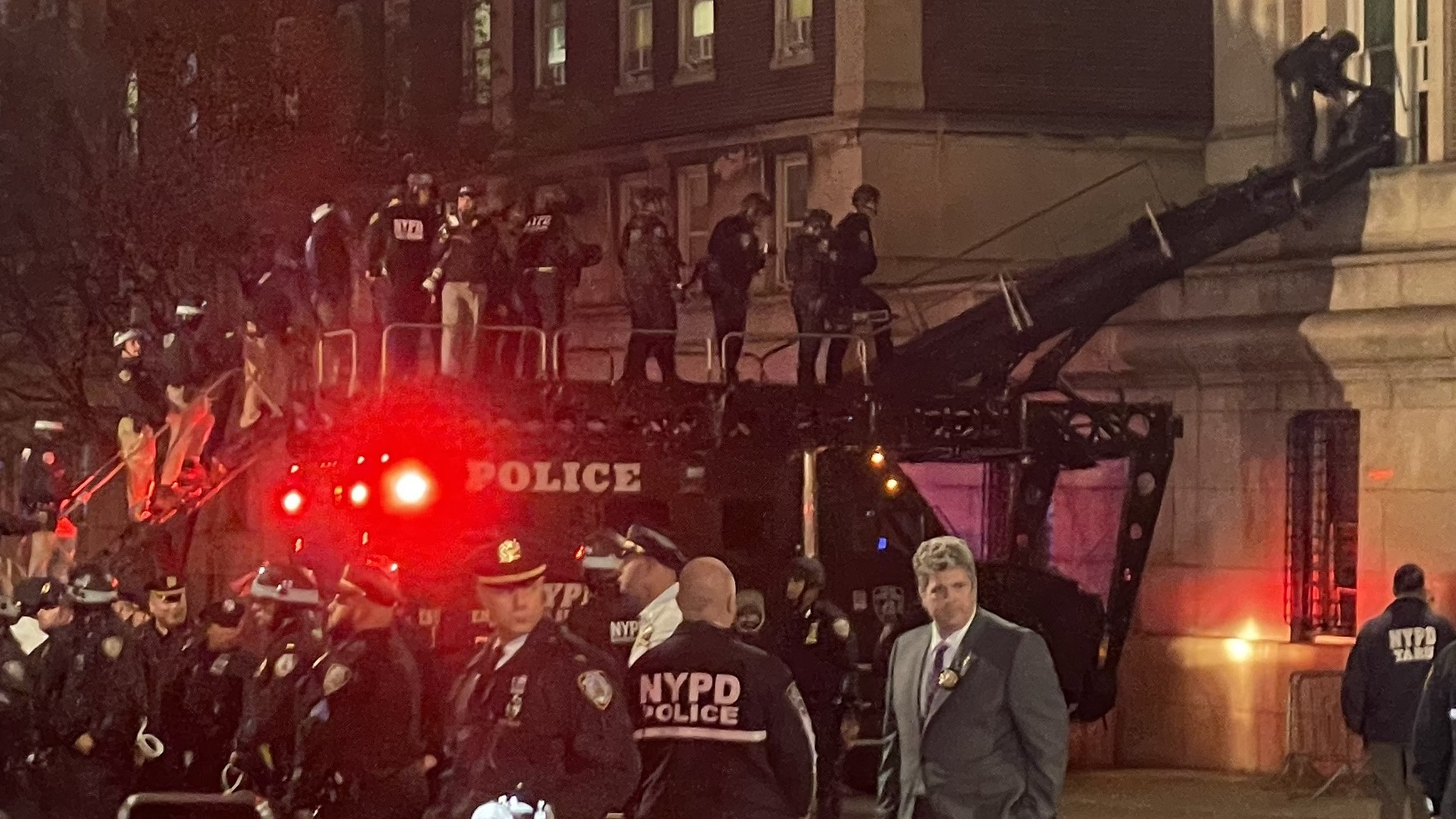
A BearCat Elevated Tactics variant used by the NYPD Emergency Service Unit at the Gaza Solidarity Encampment at Columbia University

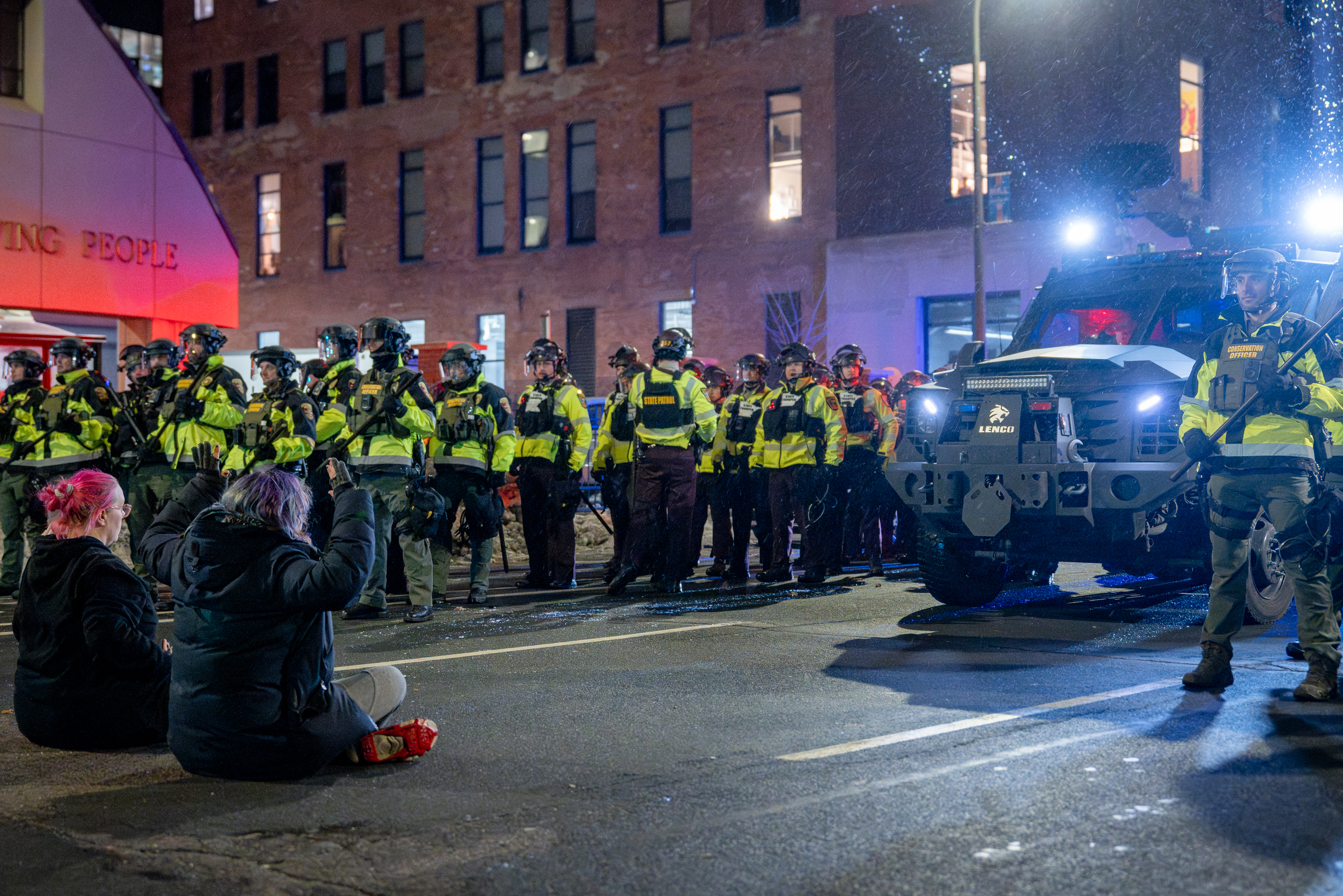
A BearCat used by United States Immigration and Customs Enforcement during protests against Operation Metro Surge

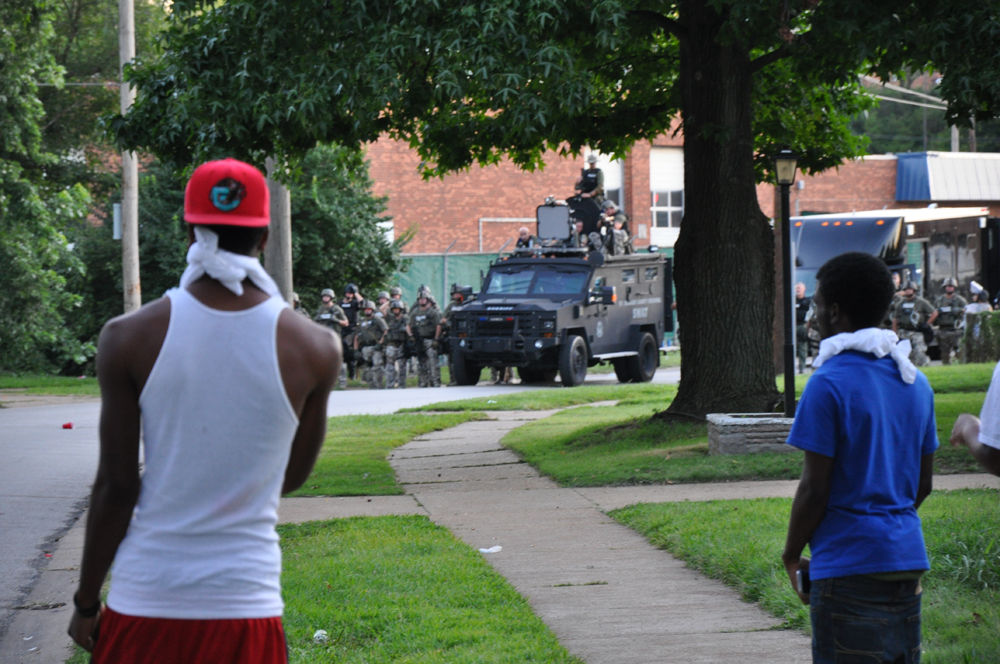
A BearCat with a long-range acoustic device mounted in the turret during the 2014 Ferguson unrest

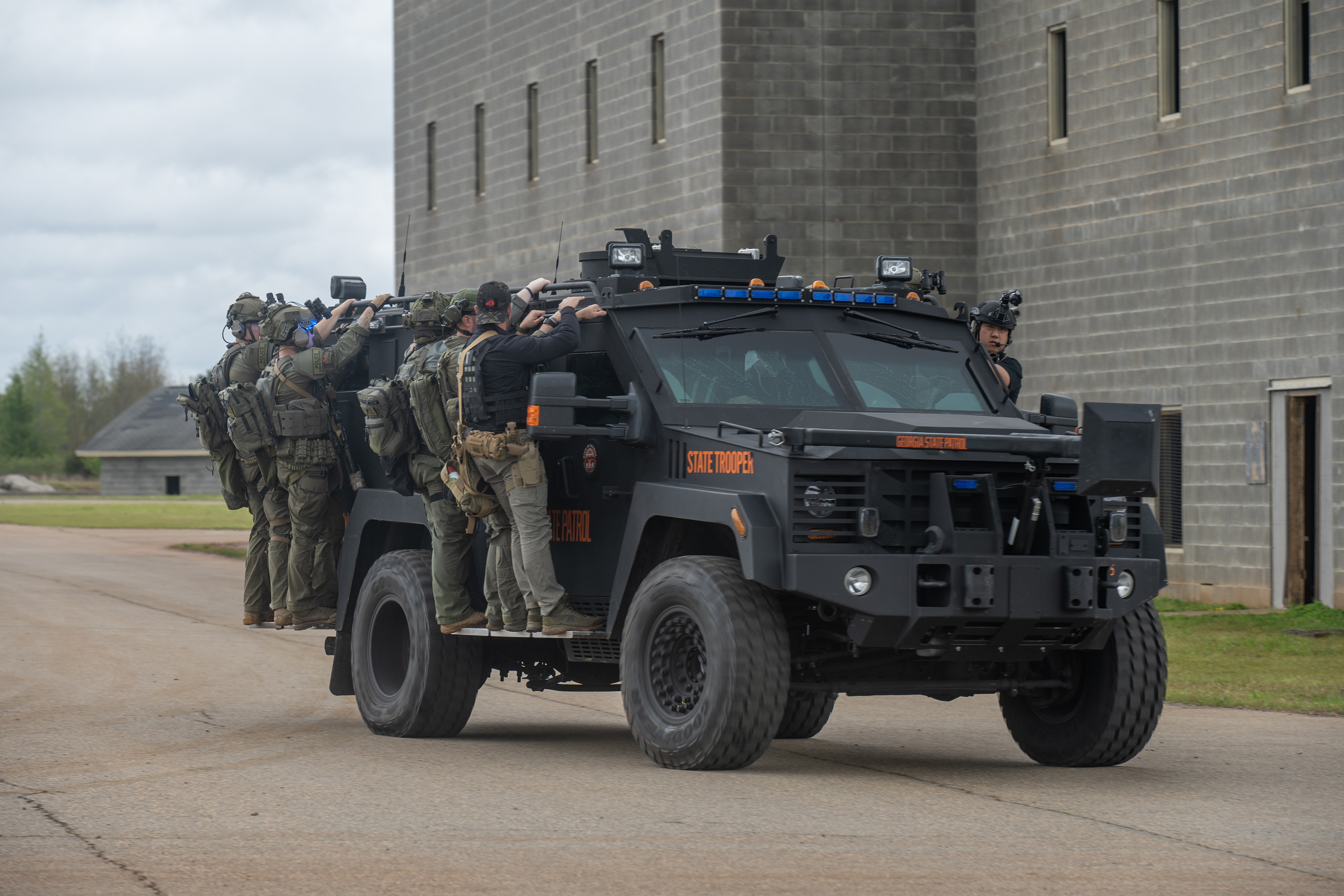
Georgia State Patrol troopers mounting a BearCat using its side handles and running boards

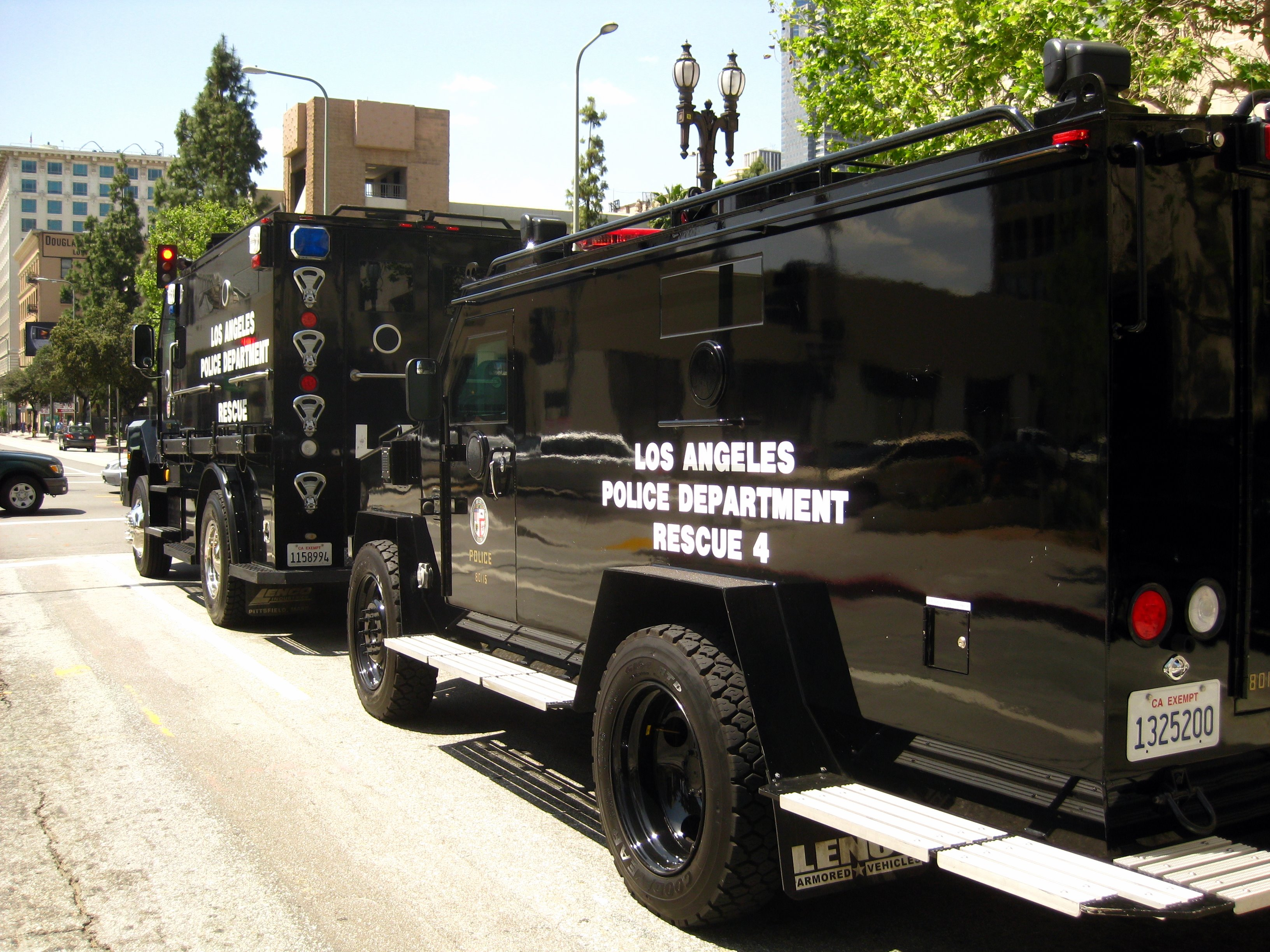
A BEAR and BearCat both operated by the LAPD
