= Lenkov =

Lenkov is a surname. Notable people with the surname include:

- Alexander Lenkov (1943–2014), Russian actor
- Peter M. Lenkov (born 1964), Canadian TV and film writer and producer

Jeffrey Lenkov TV Producer
