= Cadillac Gage Ranger =

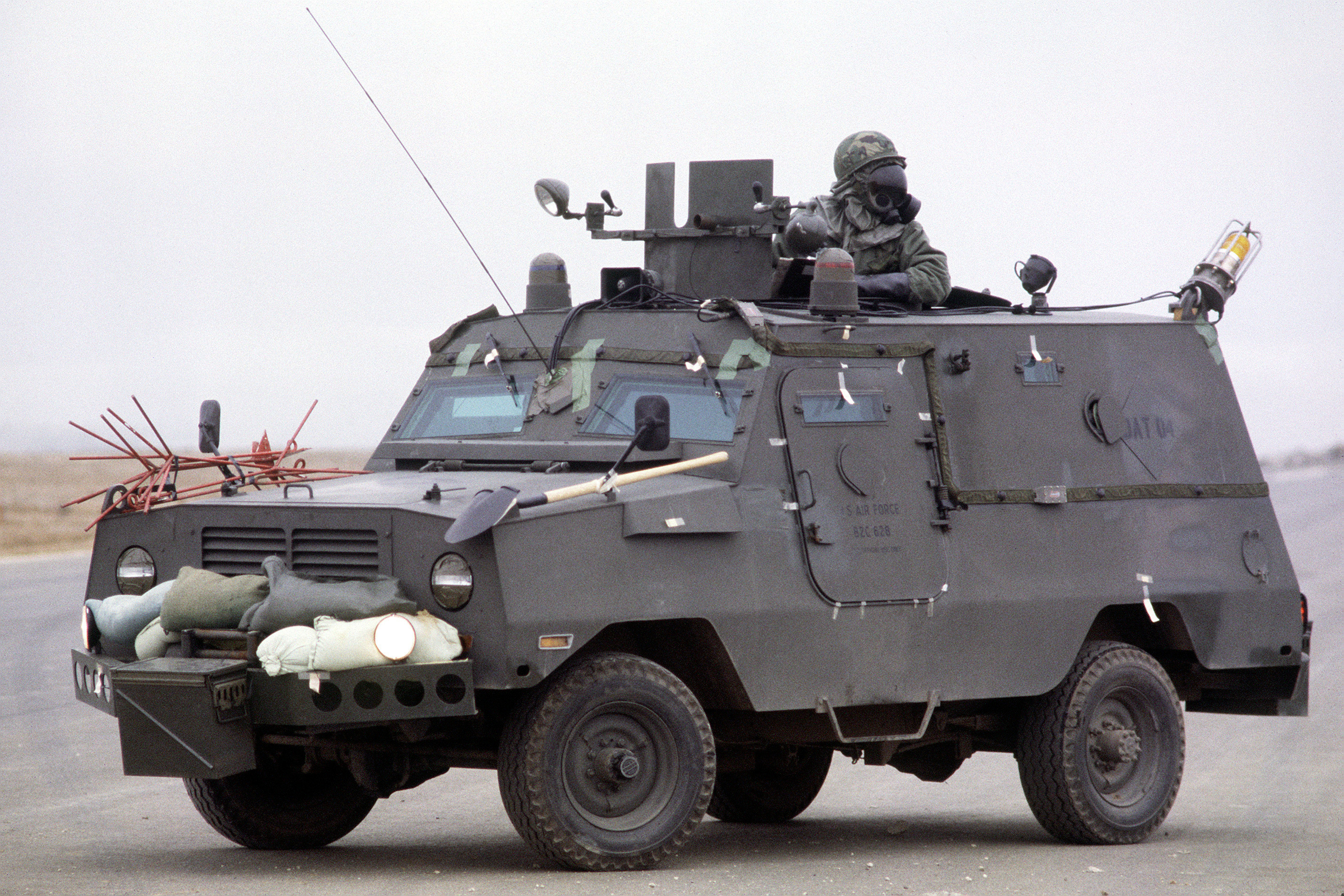
- A United States Air Force Cadillac Gage Ranger at Spangdahlem Air Base in 1985
- Type: Internal security vehicle
- Place of origin: United States

Service history
- In service: April 1980–late 1990s
- Used by: See Operators
- Wars: Implementation Force

Production history
- Designer: Cadillac Gage
- Manufacturer: Textron Marine & Land Systems
- Unit cost: $230,720
- Produced: 1979–?

Specifications
- Mass: 4,903 kg (10,809 lb) (loaded)
- Length: 5,030 mm (198 in)
- Height: 2,030 mm (80 in)
- Crew: 1
- Passengers: 5
- Main armament: 1x general-purpose machine gun (optional)
- Transmission: Automatic
- Ground clearance: 203 mm (8.0 in)
- Operational range: 483 km (300 miles)
- Maximum speed: 113 km/h (70 mph)

The Cadillac Gage Ranger, known popularly and in United States military service as the Cadillac Gage Peacekeeper or Cadillac Gage Peacekeeper I, is a four-wheeled armored personnel carrier marketed as an internal security vehicle, produced by Cadillac Gage (now Textron Marine & Land Systems). Built on a Dodge truck chassis, production began in 1979 to produce an armored vehicle for the United States Air Force (USAF) Security Forces, its largest customer, though Luxembourg and Indonesia also reportedly used Rangers as well. The Ranger also saw considerable service with law enforcement as a SWAT vehicle.

The Cadillac Gage Ranger is no longer offered by Textron, with trademarks cancelled, though it is unclear when it was discontinued. In 2003, Textron unveiled a successor to the Ranger, the Cadillac Gage Peacekeeper II. As of 2020, the Ranger's per unit replacement cost is approximately US$230,720.

== History ==
The Cadillac Gage Ranger began production in 1979 to meet a USAF Security Forces requirement for armored vehicles to use in base protection and patrols. The first Rangers were delivered to the USAF in April 1980, with 571 vehicles under a contract of $30,532 each. In 1981, 560 additional Rangers were ordered by the USAF and the United States Navy. By 1994, around 708 Rangers had been produced and served with the U.S. military, with 20 of those Rangers sold to Indonesia the same year.

By the mid-to-late 1990s, the Ranger was being phased out of service to be replaced by the Humvee, but in 1996, Rangers with the USAF Security Forces were deployed to Bosnia and Herzegovina as part of Implementation Force peacekeeping, the only time they are known to have been deployed in a military conflict.

When the USAF Security Forces retired their Rangers, they were sold to American law enforcement as part of the United States Department of Defense's Law Enforcement Support Office.

In 1996, National Museum of the United States Air Force collections chief Scott Ferguson convinced his superiors that a 1980 Cadillac Gage Ranger on display at the museum had been requested by another military facility; however, this was in fact a lie Ferguson used to steal the Ranger, drive it off Wright-Patterson Air Force Base, and hide it in Middletown, Ohio. Between 1997 and 1998, Ferguson drove the Ranger across Ohio state lines and displayed it at military conventions in Tennessee and Pennsylvania before selling it on the black market on July 11, 1999 for $18,000; it would ultimately be sold to the Cherokee County Sheriff's Office in North Carolina for $38,000. In August 2004, Ferguson was found guilty for stealing the Ranger and crossing state lines in it. He was sentenced to 12 months in prison and 3 years of supervised release, and fined $29,000 in restitution.

In 2010, Federal Defense Industries and Textron entered an agreement to allow FDI to provide authorized aftermarket parts, support, and assistance for servicing the Ranger. Defenseshield is contracted to provide replacement windows for Rangers still in service.

== Design ==
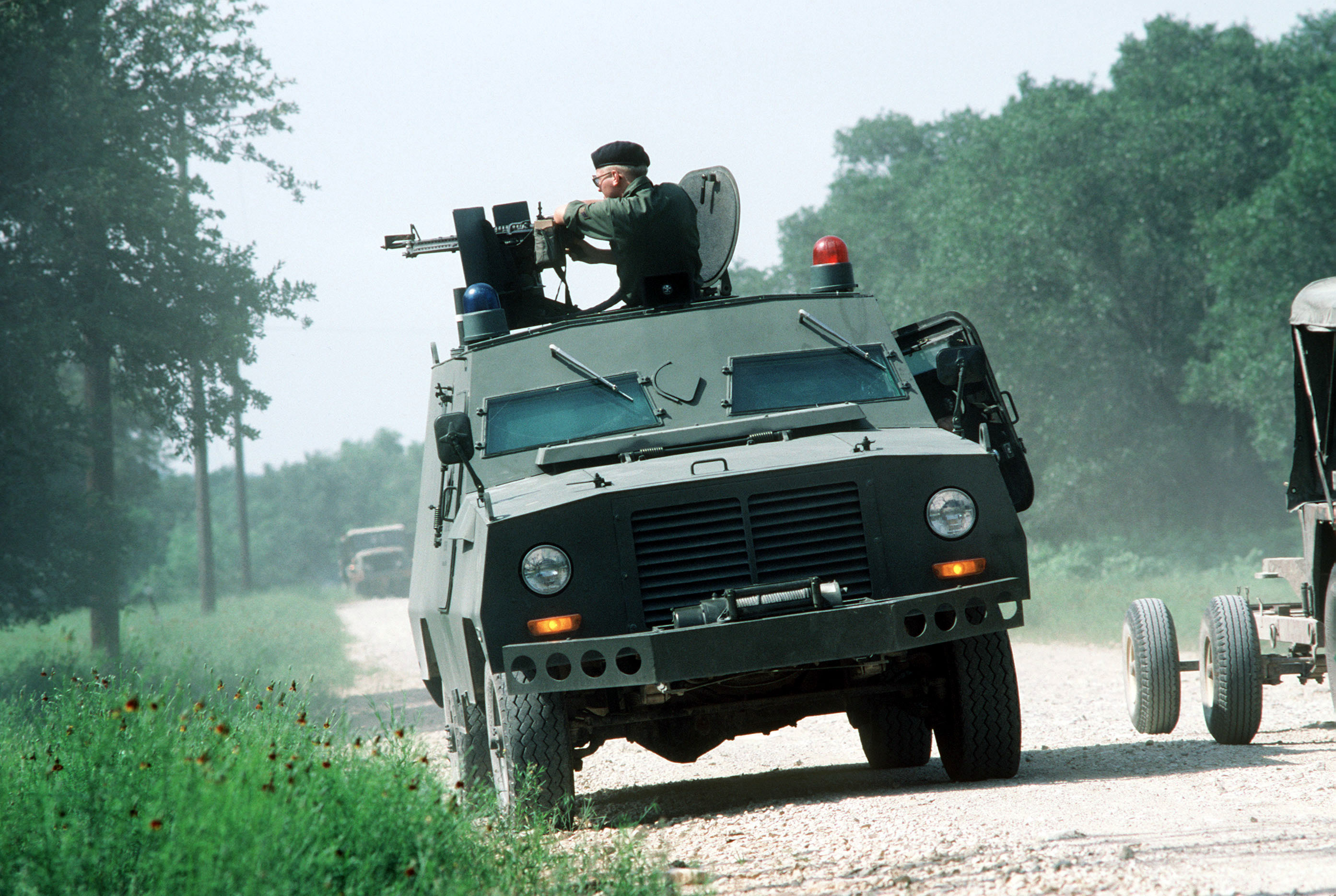
A member of USAF Security Forces manning an M60 machine gun mounted atop a Cadillac Gage Ranger in 1983

The Cadillac Gage Ranger is built on a Dodge Ram truck chassis with a shorter wheelbase. It uses a front-engine, four-wheel-drive layout, coupled to an automatic transmission with three forward gears and one reverse gear. The Ranger has a weight of 4,903 kg (10,809 lb) when loaded, with a length of 5,030 mm (198 in), a height of 2,030 mm (80 in), and a ground clearance of 203 mm (8.0 in). Its top speed is 113 km/h (70 mph) with an operational range of 483 km (300 miles).

The vehicle can carry one driver, one front passenger, and four rear passengers. Bucket seats are provided for the driver and front passenger, while bench seats are provided for the rear cabin. The entire body of the vehicle, including the floor, features Cadloy vehicle armor capable of withstanding 7.62 mm fire.

Weapons are installed on a rotatable top-mounted gun turret that allows for the mounting of a general-purpose machine gun (typically excluded in law enforcement configurations), as well as firing ports for the vehicle's occupants to fire weapons and dispense devices such as smoke grenades with minimal risk.

== Peacekeeper II ==
The Cadillac Gage Peacekeeper II was a modernized follow-up to the Cadillac Gage Ranger, first unveiled in 2003.

== Operators ==
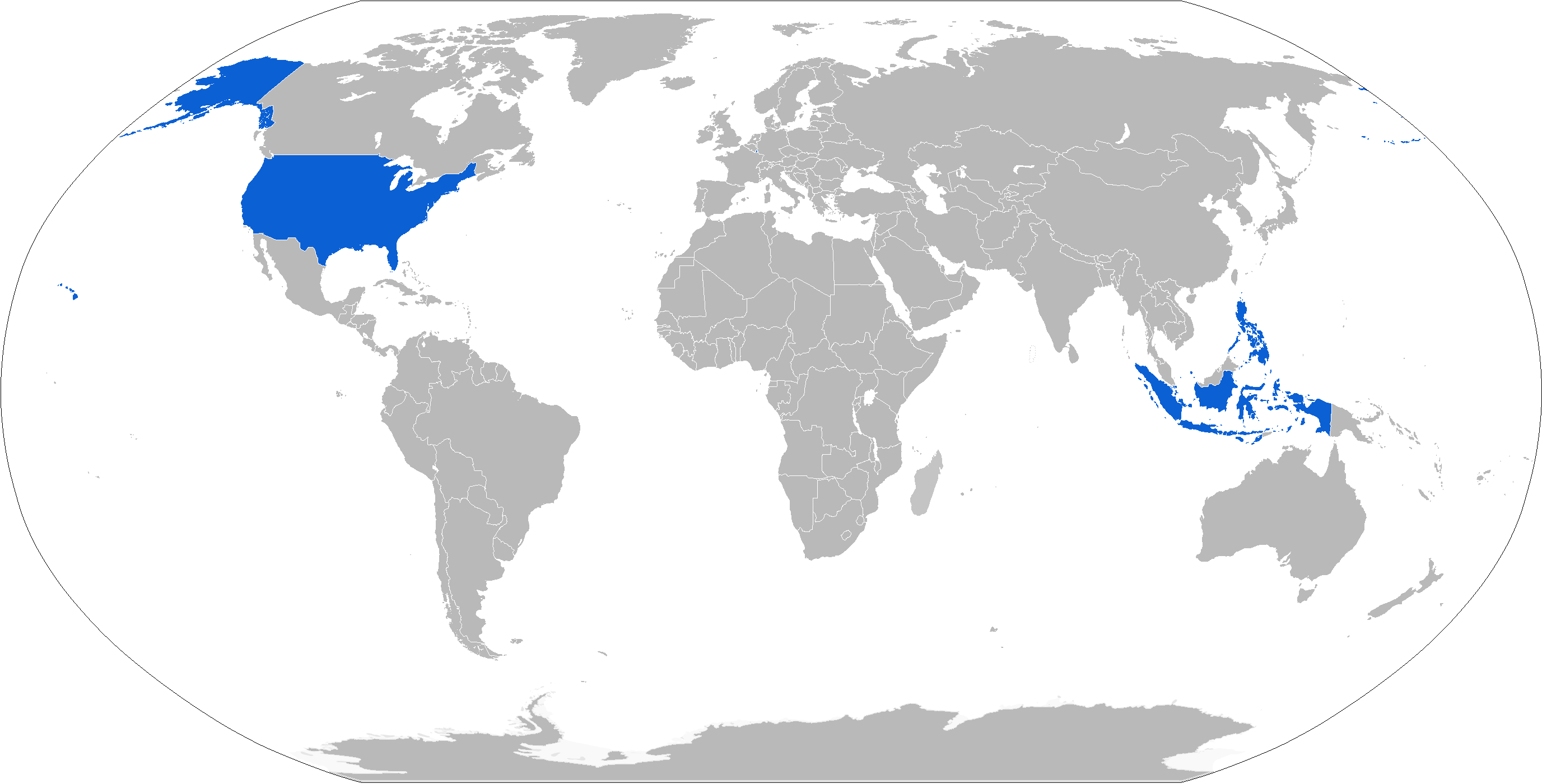
Map of Gage Ranger operators in blue

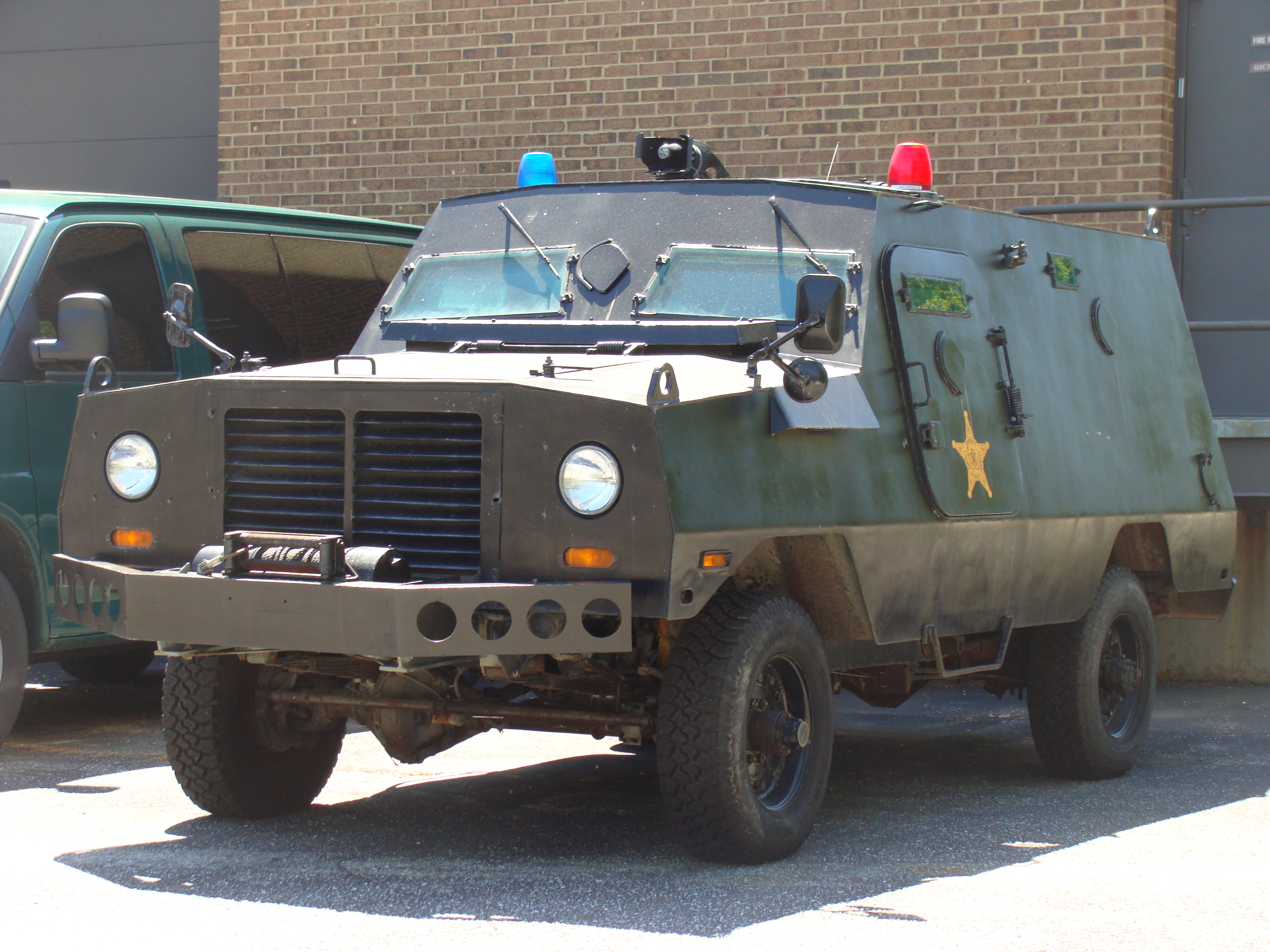
Ranger of the Prince George's County Sheriff's Office in 2009

=== Current operators ===
- United States
  - As of 2020, two Rangers are in active USAF service.
  - Anaheim Police Department, in the process of being replaced.
  - Sacramento Police Department, Still present but used very infrequently.
  - Benton County Sheriff's Office
  - Becker County Sheriff's Office
  - Chapel Hill Police Department
  - Cherokee County Sheriff's Office
  - Cobb County Police Department
  - Montclair Police Department
  - Neenah Police Department
  - Salisbury Police Department
  - South Pasadena Police Department
  - Modesto Police Department
  - Jefferson County (Ohio) Sheriff's Department
  - Jackson County (Michigan) Sherriff's Department
  - Ripon Police Department

=== Former operators ===
- Indonesia: 20 Rangers adopted in service in 1994. Known to be used by Paspampres.
- Luxembourg
- United States: Formerly with US military service
  - Was briefly used by US Border Patrol.
  - Burbank Police Department
  - Columbia Police Department
  - Frederick Police Department
  - San Joaquin County Sheriff's Office
  - Tri-Cities Region SWAT Team
  - Prince George's County MD Sheriff's Department

== See also ==
- Roshel Senator
- Lenco BearCat
