= Internal security vehicle =

Personal armoured vehicle

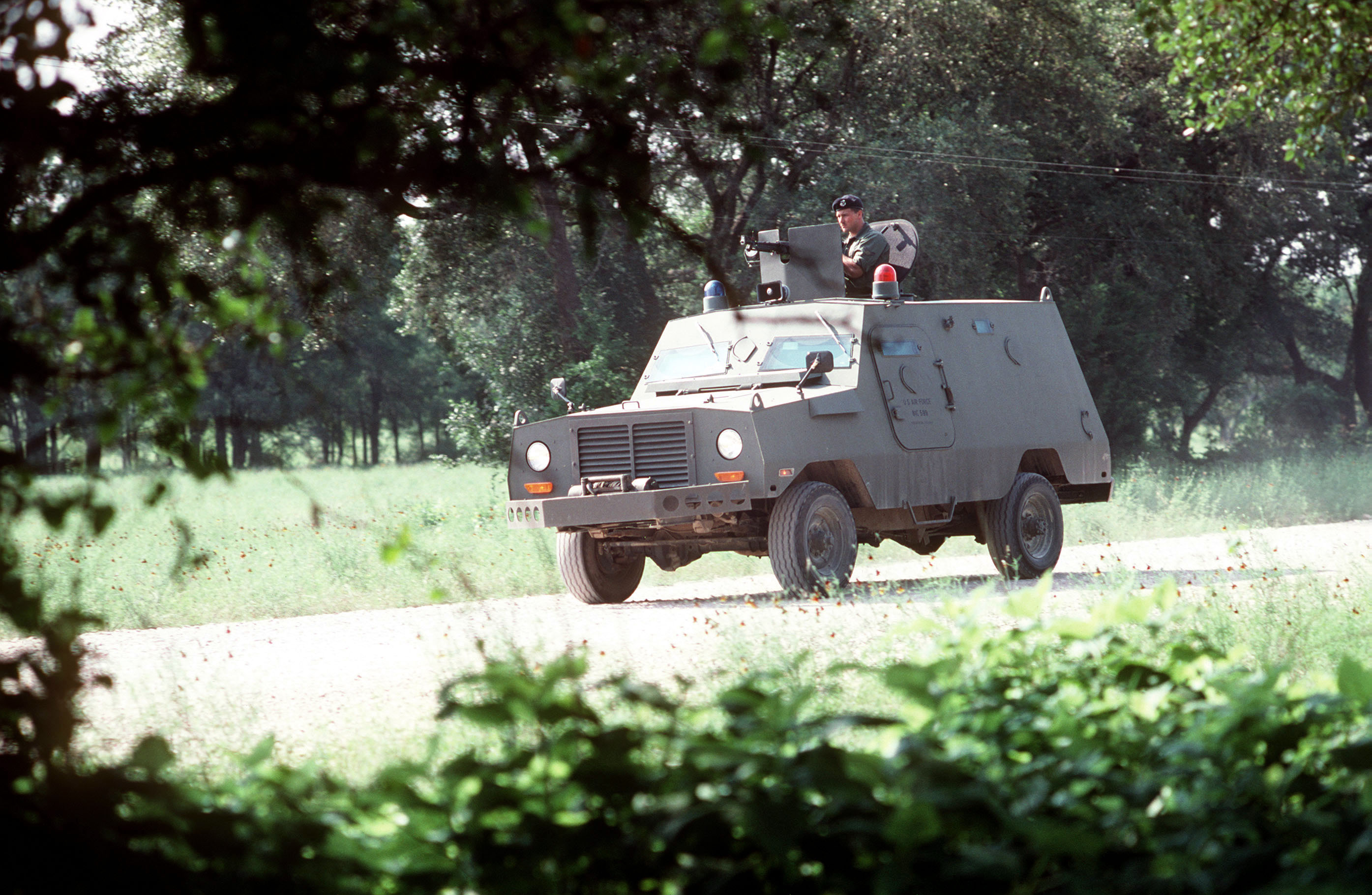
United States Air Force Cadillac Gage Ranger (1983)

An internal security vehicle (ISV), also known as an armored security vehicle (ASV), is an armored car or armored personnel carrier used for supporting contingency operations.

== Design ==
Internal security vehicles are typically armed with a turreted heavy machine gun and auxiliary medium machine gun. The vehicle is designed to minimize firepower dead space and the vehicle's weapons can be depressed to a maximum of 12°. Less-lethal water cannons and tear gas cannons can provide suppressive fire in lieu of unnecessary deadly fire.

The vehicle must be protected against weapons typical of riots. Protection from incendiary devices is achieved through coverage of the air intake and exhaust ports as well as a strong locking mechanism on the fuel opening. Turret and door locks prevent access to the interior of the vehicle by rioters. Vision blocks, ballistic glass and window shutters and outside surveillance cameras allow protected observation from within the vehicle.

Wheeled 4×4 and 6×6 configurations are typical of security vehicles. Tracked security vehicles are often cumbersome and can have negative political connotations for being perceived as an invading or occupying force.

== Gallery ==
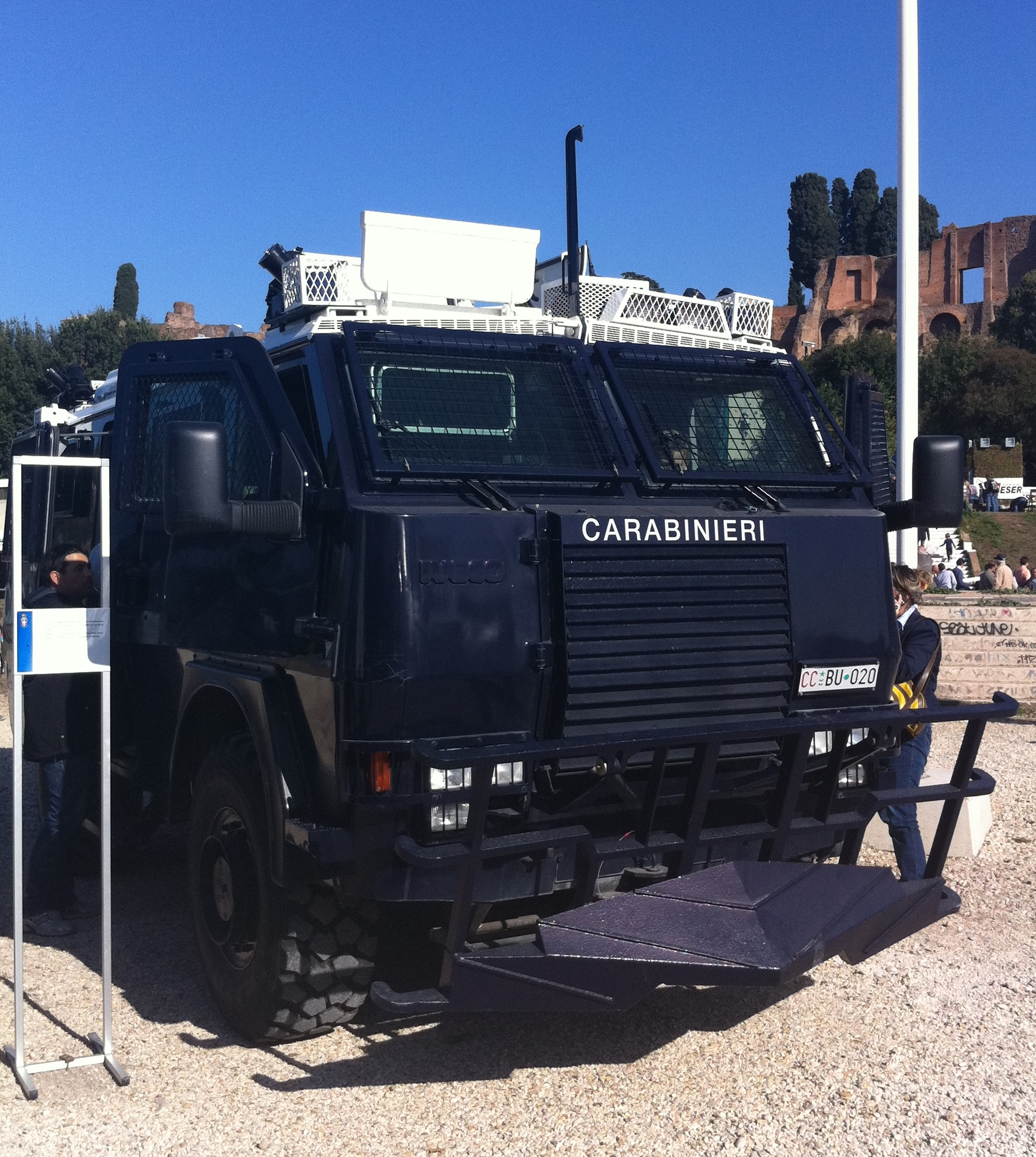
Italian Carabinieri RG-12 (2010)

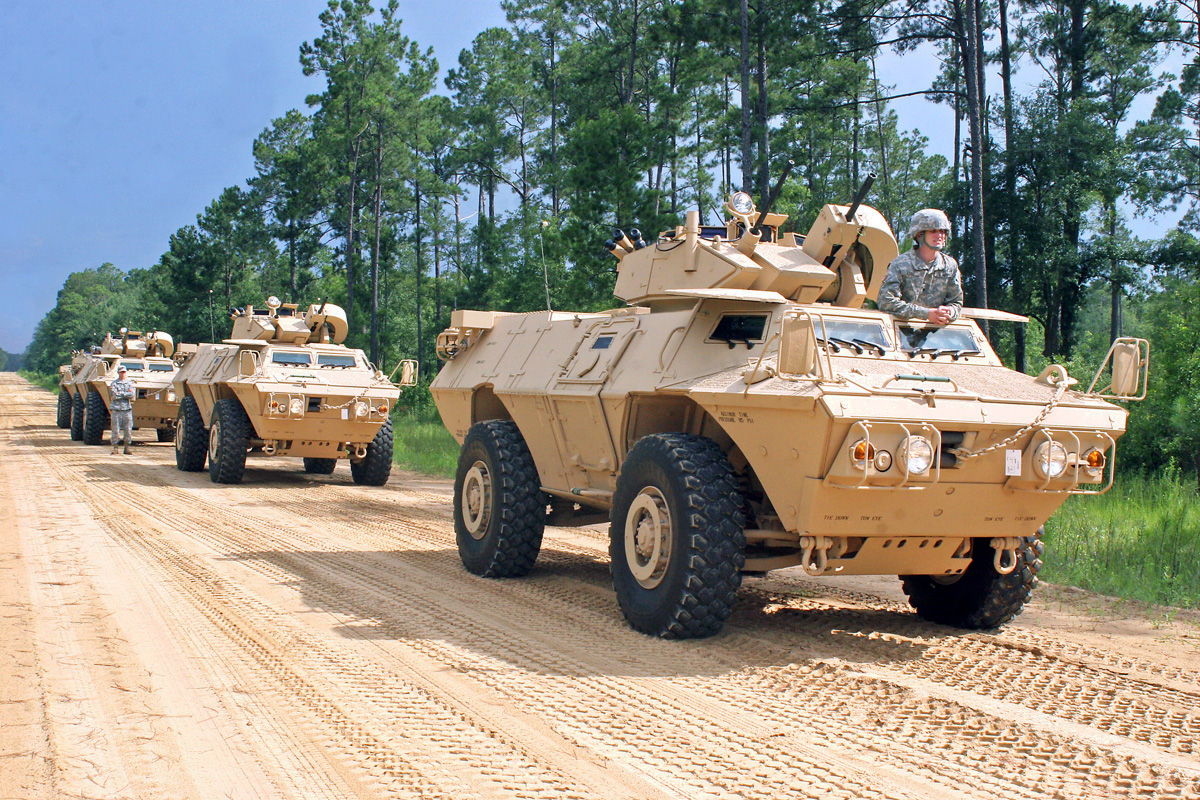
U.S. Army M1117 armored security vehicle (2010)

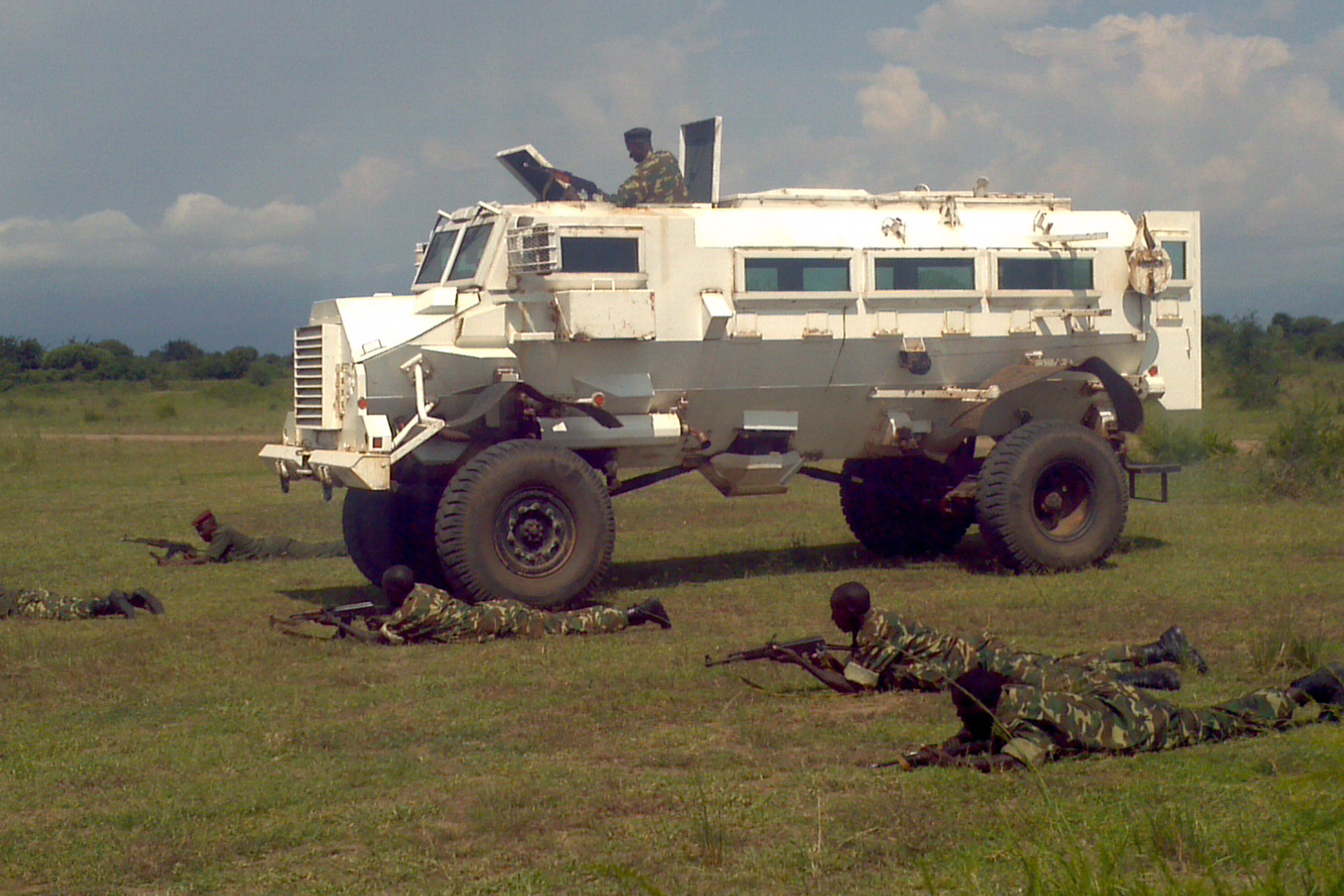
South African Casspir (2012)

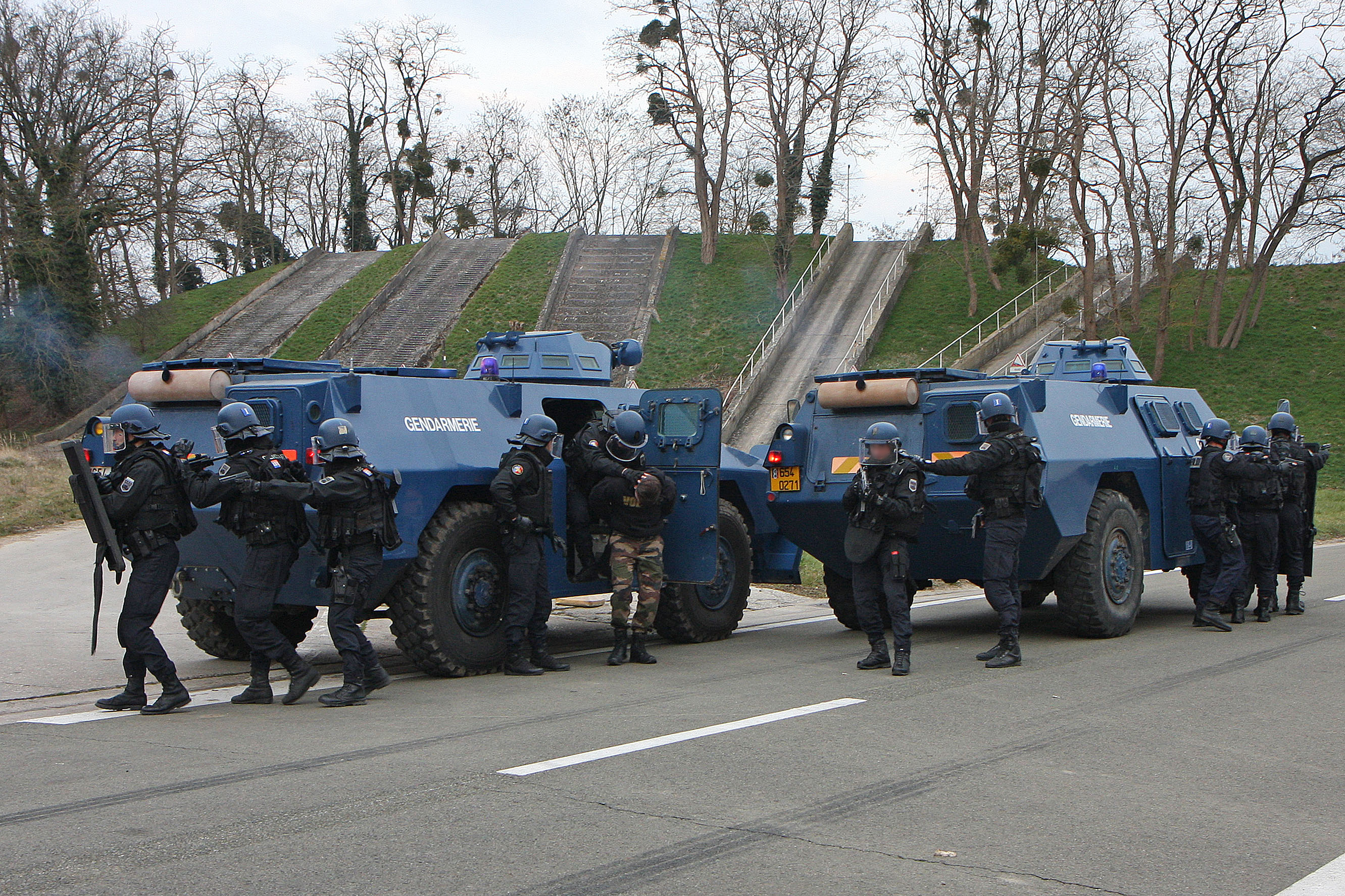
French Gendarmerie VXB 170 (2016)

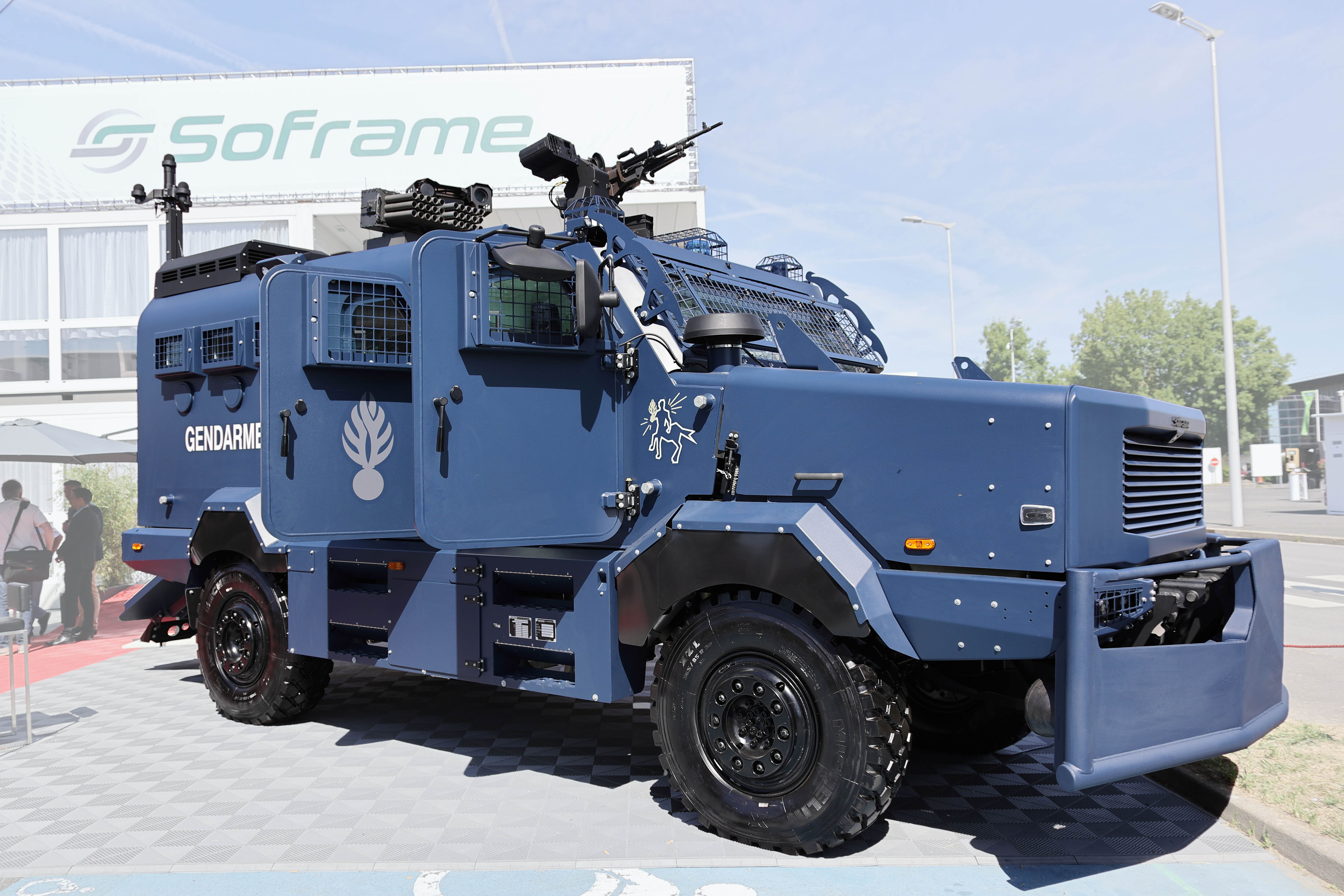
French VIPG Centaure (2022)

== See also ==
- Armored car (military)
- SWAT vehicle
