= Conservator of the peace =

In ancient British customs, Conservators of the Peace (Latin: Custodes pacis), or Wardens of the Peace, were individuals who had a special charge, by virtue of their office, to see that the King's peace was kept.

== England ==
The 18th century legal writer Thomas Edlyne Tomlins, in an 1820 legal dictionary, defines "conservator of the peace" as a person who until the creation of the justices of the peace by King Edward III, had "an especial charge to see the king's peace kept" either as incident to other offices or of itself. The king was the "principal conservator of the peace within all his dominions"; other general conservators of the peace included the Lord Chancellor or Lord Keeper, Lord Treasurer, Lord High Steward, Earl Marischal, Lord High Constable, justices of the King's Bench, and Master of the Rolls. At common law, sheriffs and sometimes constables were regarded as conservators of the peace within their county, and constables and tythingmen were also seen as conservators of the peace within their jurisdiction.

More recently, the chamberlain of Chester was a conservator in the county of Cheshire.

== Virginia ==
The role of "special conservators of the peace" still exists in the U.S. state of Virginia. These individuals are appointed by a Virginia Circuit Court to perform certain duties and responsibilities within a geographically limited jurisdiction, and are regulated by the Virginia Department of Criminal Justice Services. Security guards are often special conservators of the peace in Virginia.
