= Combat Training Centre - Jungle Training Wing =

- Active: 1942 – present
- Country: Australia
- Branch: Australian Army
- Type: Jungle Warfare
- Part of: Combat Training Centre
- Garrison/HQ: Tully, Queensland
- Motto(s): The oath to serve your country did not include a contract for normal luxury and comforts enjoyed within our society. On the contrary, it implied hardships, loyalty and devotion to duty, regardless of your rank. This battle school is here to remind you of that oath.
- Abbreviation: JTW

Combat Training Centre – Jungle Training Wing (CTC-JTW) is located in Tully, Queensland and are the Australian Army's specialists in jungle warfare, with their primary mission being to deliver basic and advanced jungle warfare training to dismounted Combat Team sized organisations. Most of the Combat Teams that complete a Sub-Unit Training (SUT) rotation at JTW are infantry rifle companies from within the Royal Australian Regiment.

JTW not only provides this training to Australian Army units but also to allied Army units, including, but not limited to the US, Indonesia and the Philippines. JTW also conducts the Junior Officer's Jungle Operations Course (JOJOC) training course as well as training in visual tracking.
