= John Hartley (general) =

Australian defence and intelligence strategist

- Born: 5 January 1943 (age 83); Cardiff, Wales
- Military career
- Allegiance: Australia
- Branch: Australian Army
- Service years: 1962–2000
- Rank: Major General
- Commands: Land Command Australia (1998–00); Deputy Chief of Army (1995–98); Defence Intelligence Organisation (1992–95); Training Command (1991–92); Albury–Wodonga Military Area (1984–87); Army Apprentices' School (1984–87)
- Conflicts: Vietnam War
- Awards: Officer of the Order of Australia; Mentioned in Despatches (2); Army Commendation Medal (3) (United States); Air Medal (United States); Cross of Gallantry (South Vietnam); Knight Commander's Cross of the Order of Merit of the Federal Republic of Germany

Major General John Curtis Hartley, AO (born 5 January 1943) is an Australian defence and intelligence strategist and a retired officer of the Australian Army. He joined the army via the Royal Military College, Duntroon in 1962, was commissioned into the Royal Australian Infantry Corps and spent much of his career in military intelligence. He twice deployed on operations during the Vietnam War, during which he was Mentioned in Despatches on two occasions and seriously wounded, and commanded the Albury–Wodonga Military Area and the Army Apprentices' School (1984–87). He served as General Officer Commanding Training Command (1991–92), Director of the Defence Intelligence Organisation (1992–95), Deputy Chief of Army (1995–98), and Land Commander Australia (1998–00). Since his retirement from the army in 2000, Hartley has been involved in community and veterans' organisations and is an active contributor to discussion on defence and strategic issues.

== Early life ==
John Curtis Hartley was born in Cardiff, Wales, on 5 January 1943 to Dorothy Ann Prosser and John Curtis Hartley. The family settled in Australia in 1953, where Hartley was educated at Nambour State High School on Queensland's Sunshine Coast. He later obtained a Bachelor of Arts degree from the University of Queensland.

== Military career ==
Hartley entered the Royal Military College, Duntroon as an Australian Army officer cadet in February 1962. On graduation, he was commissioned a lieutenant in the Royal Australian Infantry Corps on 15 December 1965 and posted to a platoon command in the 5th Battalion, Royal Australian Regiment (5RAR). Shortly after, 5RAR was mobilised for deployment to Vietnam. The battalion underwent three months of rigorous training prior to emplaning for Vietnam, arriving on 8 May. Within two weeks, Hartley and 5RAR were engaged in active operations. Alongside the United States 503rd Infantry Regiment and the 1st Battalion, Royal Australian Regiment, 5RAR took part in Operation Hardihood to clear an area in Phước Tuy Province to establish Nui Dat, a base of operations for the 1st Australian Task Force. Hartley was twice Mentioned in Despatches for his distinguished performance in Vietnam.

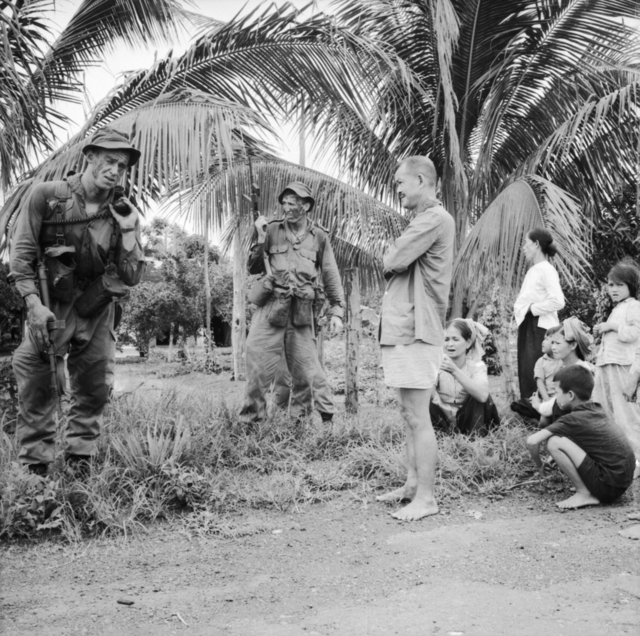
Lieutenant John Hartley (centre, with Owen Gun) and soldiers of 5RAR guard Vietnamese civilians following a house sweep, 26 May 1966.

Hartley returned from Vietnam in May 1967 and was posted as aide-de-camp to the General Officer Commanding Northern Command in Brisbane. He was advanced to temporary captain on 24 July that year, appointed General Staff Officer (Grade 3) Operations at headquarters 6th Task Force in 1968, and made substantive captain from 15 December 1969. In April 1970 he returned to Vietnam for a second tour, this time as a military advisor with the Australian Army Training Team Vietnam. In this capacity, Hartley was a senior advisor to a battalion of the Army of the Republic of Vietnam. He was seriously wounded while operating in Phước Tuy Province on 21 March 1971 and was evacuated to Australia on 5 April, but in recognition of his service Hartley was awarded a Cross of Gallantry from the South Vietnamese government, as well as an Army Commendation Medal with oak leaf cluster and "V" device and an Air Medal from the United States.

In 1973, Hartley was appointed adjutant of the Australian Army Intelligence Centre in Woodside, South Australia, and advanced to temporary major from 3 August. He was posted as Staff Officer (Grade 2) Operations and Intelligence to the 4th Military District in 1974, confirmed in the rank of major on 15 December 1975, and appointed a senior instructor at the School of Military Intelligence in Canungra, Queensland, from 1976. Hartley was posted on a two-year exchange with the United States Army Pacific, based in Hawaii, from 1977. He returned to Australia with a second oak leaf cluster to his Army Commendation Medal and, on 15 January 1980, was made temporary lieutenant colonel and appointed to the directing staff of the Army Command and Staff College. His rank was made substantive from 14 July the same year.

Hartley was appointed as Staff Officer (Grade 1) Operations at the headquarters 1st Division in 1981, made deputy director of Military Intelligence at Australian Army headquarters in Canberra in 1983 and, promoted colonel on 17 December 1984, was posted as Commander of the Albury–Wodonga Military Area and Commandant of the Army Apprentices' School. For his performance in the latter command, Hartley was appointed a Member of the Order of Australia in the 1987 Birthday Honours. He completed the course at the United States Army War College in 1987–88 and, with the rank of brigadier, was posted as Military Secretary at Australian Army headquarters from 1988. As a major general, Hartley was appointed General Officer Commanding Training Command in 1991, advanced to an Officer of the Order of Australia in the Birthday Honours the following June, and succeeded Major General John Baker as Director of the Defence Intelligence Organisation in 1992. After three years as head of Australia's military intelligence agency, he was appointed Deputy Chief of Army in 1995. In 1998, Hartley was awarded a Knight Commander's Cross of the Order of Merit of the Federal Republic of Germany and made Land Commander Australia; his final military appointment before he retired in 2000 after 38 years of military service.

== Post-military life ==
Since retiring from the army, Hartley has been active in community and veterans' organisations and a contributor to research on defence and strategic issues. He has lectured on geo-strategic issues at the University of Queensland and Griffith University, has published on military and strategic matters in a range of newspapers and defence magazines, and was the commentator on SBS television and ABC Radio National for the initial phase of the Iraq War in 2003. He was also appointed National President of the Australian Army Training Team Vietnam Association in 2000, President of the National Rifle Association of Australia in 2006, and Chairman of the Battle Honours Committee in 2007. He has been Institute Director and CEO of the strategic research institute Future Directions International since 2009, and is on the board of Soils for Life, an organisation that promotes regenerative landscape management practices.

Hartley has two daughters, and lives in the Perth suburb of Nedlands, Western Australia.

== Bibliography ==
- Davies, Bruce; McKay, Gary (2005). The Men Who Persevered: The AATTV – The Most Highly Decorated Australian Unit of the Viet Nam War. Crows Nest: Allen & Unwin. ISBN 9781741144253.
- O'Neill, Robert (1968). Vietnam Task: The 5th Battalion, the Royal Australian Regiment, 1966/67. Melbourne: Cassell Australia. OCLC 20116.

Military offices
Preceded by Major General Frank Hickling	Land Commander Australia; 1998–2000	Succeeded by Major General Peter Cosgrove
Preceded by Major General Geoffrey Carter	Deputy Chief of Army; 1995–1998	Succeeded by Major General Peter Abigail
Preceded by Major General John Baker	Director of the Defence Intelligence Organisation; 1992–1995	Succeeded by Major General James Connolly
