= Frank Hickling =

Australian Army officer

- Born: 13 October 1941 (age 85); Gosford, New South Wales
- Military career
- Allegiance: Australia
- Branch: Australian Army
- Service years: 1961–2000
- Rank: Lieutenant General
- Commands: Chief of Army (1998–00); Land Command (1996–98); Australian Defence Force Academy (1995–96); Training Command (1992–94); Northern Command (c.1990–92)
- Conflicts: Vietnam War; Operation Bel Isi
- Awards: Officer of the Order of Australia; Conspicuous Service Cross

Lieutenant General Francis John Hickling, AO, CSC (born 13 October 1941) is a retired senior Australian Army officer, whose career culminated with his appointment as Chief of Army from 1998 to 2000.

== Military career ==
Hickling graduated from the Officer Cadet School, Portsea, in 1961. He undertook regimental postings with the Royal Australian Engineers, and saw service in Vietnam from 1970 to 1971.

After serving as the Director of Plans, Army, Hickling was appointed Commander, Northern Command and received the Conspicuous Service Cross (CSC) for service in that role in 1993. This was followed by a posting as General Officer Commanding Training Command from 1992 to 1994.

Made commandant of the Australian Defence Force Academy in 1995, Hickling was appointed an Officer of the Order of Australia (AO) for distinguished service to the Army and Australian Defence Force in the field of military training in 1996. On promotion to Major General, Hickling then served as Commandant, Australian Defence Force Academy followed by Land Commander Australia from 1996 until 1998. In February 1998, he led Operation Bel Isi, a peace monitoring mission to Bougainville following a break in civil unrest in the country.

Hickling was promoted lieutenant general and appointed Chief of the Army in 1998. As Chief of the Army he deployed Australian troops to East Timor.

In retirement he chaired the Review of the Australian Defence Force Cadets (ADFC) Scheme which reported in 2008. Hickling also served as Senior Mentor, Australian College of Defence and Strategic Studies, and Advisor to BAE Systems. Hickling remains the Representative Colonel Commandant, Royal Australian Engineers.

Military offices
Preceded by Lieutenant General John Sanderson	Chief of Army; 1998–2000	Succeeded by Lieutenant General Peter Cosgrove
Preceded by Major General Peter Arnison	Land Commander Australia; 1996–1998	Succeeded by Major General John Hartley
Preceded by Rear Admiral Anthony Carwardine	Commandant of the Australian Defence Force Academy; 1995–1996	Succeeded by Air Vice Marshal Gary Beck
