= Combined Arms Training Centre =

Training establishment of the Australian Army

- Active: 1998–present
- Country: Australia
- Branch: Australian Army
- Type: Training Establishment
- Role: Combat corps officer and soldier training
- Size: Four schools
- Part of: Forces Command
- Garrison/HQ: Bridges Barracks

Insignia
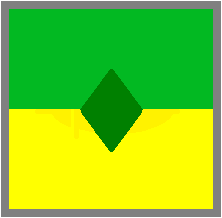
- Unit Colour Patch

The Combined Arms Training Centre (CATC) is an Australian Army training establishment that is part of Forces Command. Its headquarters is located at Bridges Barracks, at Puckapunyal, near Seymour, Victoria, approximately 100 kilometres (62 mi) to the north of Melbourne.

The centre was established in 1998–1999, in the mould of the Army Logistic Training Centre, to group the individual schools of the Army's combat corps – armour, artillery, engineers and infantry – under one command. At the time of its establishment it was known as the Combat Arms Training Centre, but in 2006 it was redesignated as the Combined Arms Training Centre. The centre is commanded by an officer with the rank of colonel who holds the appointment of commandant. Of its constituent schools, two – the School of Artillery and the School of Armour – are co-located with HQ CATC at Puckapunyal, while the School of Infantry is located at Lone Pine Barracks at Singleton, New South Wales, and the School of Military Engineering is located at Holsworthy Barracks in the Liverpool Military Area.

The establishment provides individual training to officers and soldiers across a number of courses including initial employment training and regimental officer basic courses, as well as more advanced and specialty courses, using a variety of techniques and technologies including simulators and other training aids, as well as operational equipment and weapons platforms. In addition, the centre is the venue for a number of other training exercises and activities. This includes the Australian Army Skill at Arms Meet (AASAM), which includes teams from the Army, Air Force and Navy, as well as teams from overseas. A combined arms firepower demonstration is also carried out at CATC every year called Exercise Chong Ju.
