= Ken Gillespie =

Australian general (born 1952)

Kenneth James Gillespie
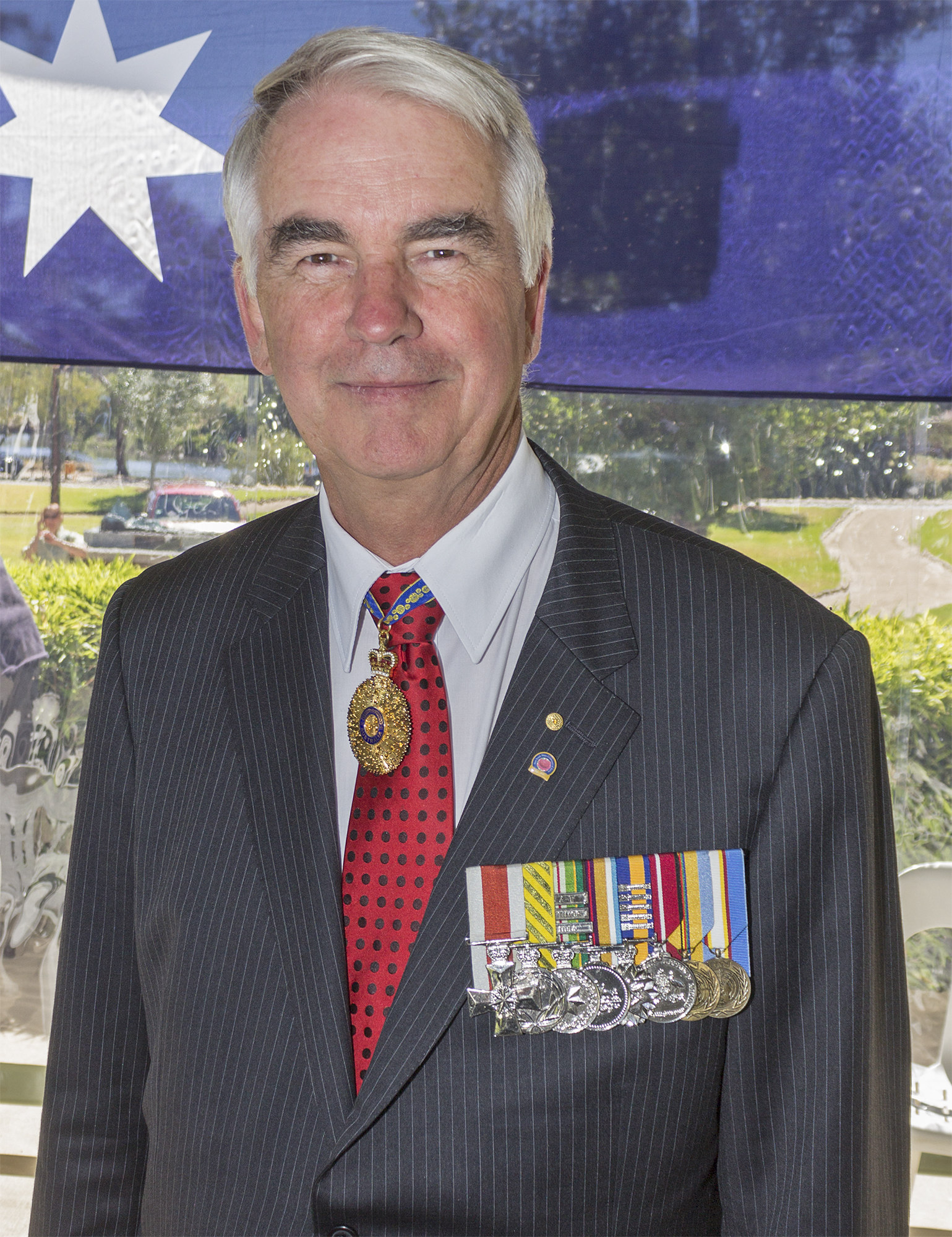
- Ken Gillespie in December 2013
- Born: 28 June 1952 (age 74); Brisbane, Queensland, Australia
- Military career
- Allegiance: Australia
- Branch: Australian Army
- Service years: 1968–2011
- Rank: Lieutenant General
- Commands: Chief of Army (2008–11); Vice Chief of the Defence Force (2005–08); Land Commander Australia (2004–05); Commander Australian Contingent, Operation Slipper (2001–02); Commander West Sector, Operation Tanager (2000–01)
- Conflicts: Namibia (UNTAG); East Timor (UNTAET); War in Afghanistan; Operation Slipper
- Awards: Companion of the Order of Australia; Distinguished Service Cross; Conspicuous Service Medal; Commander of the Legion of Merit (United States); Meritorious Service Medal (Singapore)

Lieutenant General Kenneth James Gillespie AC, DSC, CSM (born 28 June 1952) is a retired senior officer in the Australian Army. Gillespie served as Vice Chief of the Defence Force from 2005 until 2008, then Chief of Army from 2008 until his retirement in June 2011.

== Military career ==
Gillespie was educated at Inala State High School in Brisbane and enlisted in the Australian Army in 1968 as an apprentice bricklayer. He graduated from the Officer Cadet School, Portsea, in 1972, gaining a commission in the corps of the Royal Australian Engineers.

Gillespie held a range of regimental and staff appointments including Instructor at the School of Military Engineering and at the 1st Recruit Training Battalion. He then held regimental appointments as a junior officer in 2nd Field Engineer Regiment, 5th Field Engineer Regiment, 2nd/3rd Field Engineer Regiment and 1st Construction Regiment, after which he became a Senior Instructor at the School of Military Engineering.

Gellespie attended the Australian Army Command and Staff College, Queenscliff in 1985 and became Australian Exchange Instructor at the Royal School of Military Engineering in the United Kingdom in 1986. In 1989 he raised and then deployed as the second in command and operations officer, the 2nd Australian Contingent to the United Nations Transition Assistance Group (UNTAG) in Namibia.

In 1990, Gillespie became Standing Chairman of the Quadripartite Working Group for the Engineers in the ABCA Armies Agreement and in 1991 he attended the UK Joint Services Command and Staff College where he earned a Graduate Diploma in Strategic Studies. In 1992 he held a senior staff appointment at the Directorate of Engineers — Army. He was appointed a Member of the Royal College of Defence Studies in the United Kingdom in 1998 and was selected to be Senior National Officer for Australia in the ABCA Program in 1999.

Gillespie's senior officer appointments included becoming inaugural commanding officer of the 3rd Combat Engineer Regiment, Staff Officer Operations to the Chief of the Defence Force, inaugural commander of the Australian Theatre Joint Intelligence Centre, for which he was made a Member of the Order of Australia, and inaugural Principal Staff Officer — Intelligence, Headquarters Australian Theatre.

He was promoted to brigadier in January 1999. In this rank he was the Chief of Staff Training Command — Army, he commanded the United Nations Sector West multinational brigade in East Timor, and he was the National Commander of Australia's contribution to Operation Slipper.

Gillespie was promoted to major general and made Land Commander Australia in January 2004, and to lieutenant general as Vice Chief of the Defence Force in 2005.

Gillespie assumed his appointment as Chief of Army on 4 July 2008. On 29 April 2010, Gillespie was presented with Singapore's Meritorious Service Medal by the Deputy Prime Minister of Singapore, Teo Chee Hean, and Chief of the Singapore Army, Brigadier General Chan Chun Sing. The award came as a result of Gillespie's "leadership and commitment to furthering relationships between the armies" of Australia and Singapore. In August 2010, controversy arose when Gillespie outlawed the wearing of berets on the grounds that they led to an increased risk of skin cancer. The exemption of the special forces from the ban added to the controversy. Gillespie handed over command of the Army to Lieutenant General David Morrison during a ceremony on 24 June 2011, and officially retired from the Australian Defence Force two days later.

== Personal life ==
Gillespie is married to Carmel and they have a student daughter. He has two grown children from a previous marriage. He is well travelled, enjoys most sports (particularly golf), and is a keen reader.

== Honours and awards ==
In February 2018, the then NSW Governor, His Excellency General the Honourable David Hurley AC DSC(rtd) promulgated in the NSW Government Gazette, the election of Ken Gillespie as a Fellow of the Royal Society of New South Wales.

For his service as the Commander Australian Contingent, Operation Slipper, Gillespie was appointed Officer of the Order of Australia in the Military Division in the 2003 Australia Day Honours. On 26 January 2011, Gillespie was promoted to Companion of the Order of Australia (AC).

Gillespie was awarded the Distinguished Service Cross in 2002 for "distinguished command and leadership" while Commander Sector West deployed on active service with the United Nations Transitional Administration East Timor during Operation Tanager.

Companion of the Order of Australia (AC)	(2011)
Officer of the Order of Australia (AO)	(2003)
Member of the Order of Australia (AM)	(1998)
Distinguished Service Cross (DSC)	(2002)
Conspicuous Service Medal (CSM)	(1992)
Australian Active Service Medal	with 3 clasps: NAMIBIA, EAST TIMOR, and ICAT
Afghanistan Medal	
Defence Force Service Medal with Federation Star	(40–44 years of service)
Australian Defence Medal	
UNTAG (United Nations Transition Assistance Group)	Namibia 1989–90 (1992)
UNTAET (United Nations Transitional Administration in East Timor)	
Commander of the Legion of Merit (United States)	2009
Meritorious Service Medal (Military) (Singapore)	2010

Military offices
Preceded by Lieutenant General Peter Leahy	Chief of Army; 2008–2011	Succeeded by Lieutenant General David Morrison
Preceded by Vice Admiral Russ Shalders	Vice Chief of the Defence Force; 2005–2008	Succeeded by Lieutenant General David Hurley
Preceded by Major General David Hurley	Land Commander Australia; 2004–2005	Succeeded by Major General Mark Kelly
