= Peter Cosgrove =

Governor-General of Australia from 2014 to 2019

General The Honourable Sir Peter Cosgrove AK, CVO, MC
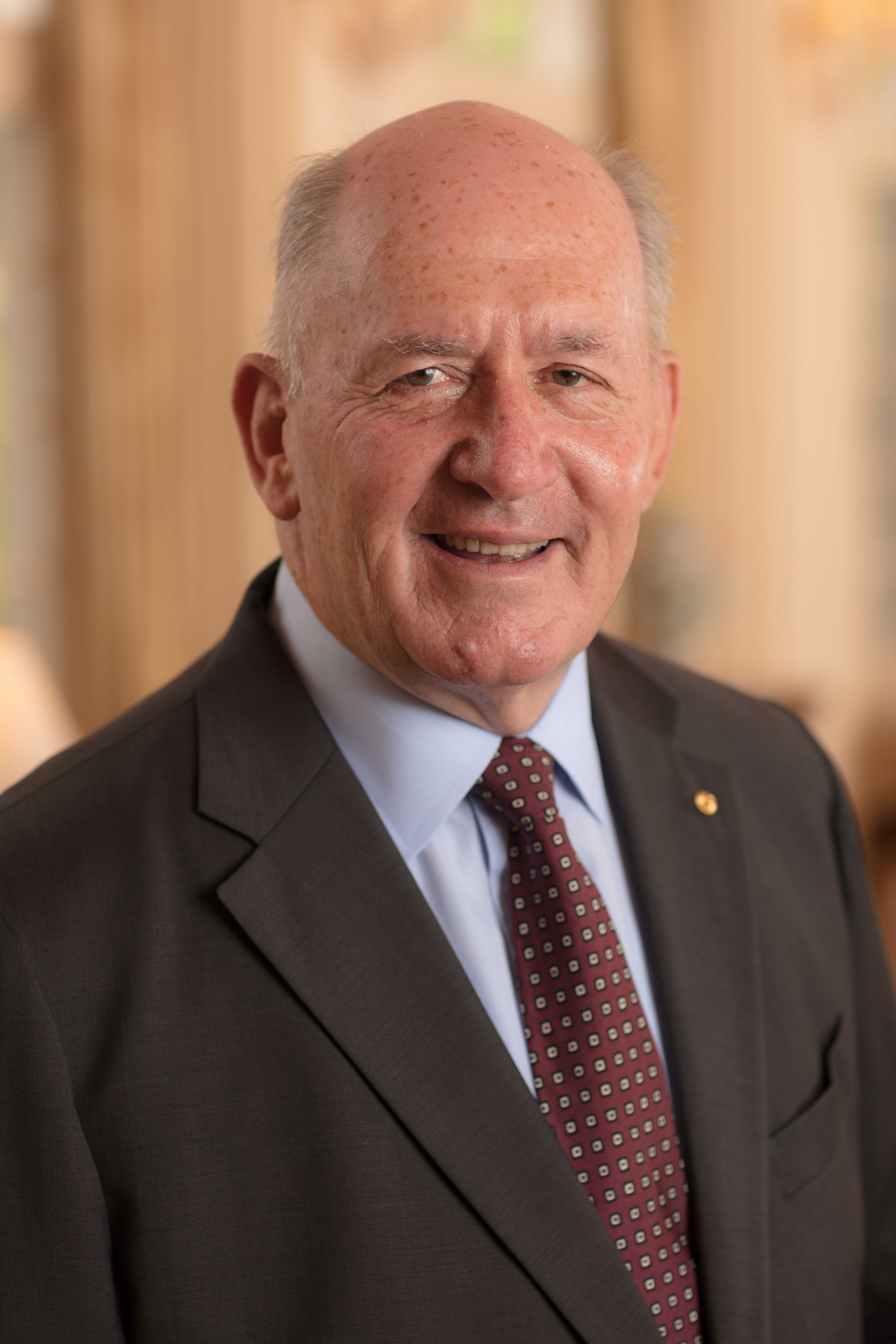
- Cosgrove in 2017

26th Governor-General of Australia
- In office 28 March 2014 – 1 July 2019
- Monarch: Elizabeth II
- Prime Minister: Tony Abbott; Malcolm Turnbull; Scott Morrison
- Preceded by: Dame Quentin Bryce
- Succeeded by: David Hurley

Administrator of the Commonwealth
- In office 30 April 2023 – 10 May 2023
- Monarch: Charles III
- Governor General: David Hurley
- Prime Minister: Anthony Albanese

Personal details
- Born: Peter John Cosgrove; 28 July 1947 (age 79) Sydney, New South Wales, Australia
- Spouse: Lynne Payne
- Children: 3
- Education: Royal Military College, Duntroon; National Defence College, India

Military service
- Allegiance: Australia
- Branch/service: Australian Army
- Years of service: 1965–2005
- Rank: General
- Commands: Chief of the Defence Force (2002–05); Chief of Army (2000–02); Land Command Australia (2000); International Force East Timor (1999–00); 1st Division (1998–99); 6th Brigade (1992–93); 1st Battalion, Royal Australian Regiment (1983–84)
- Battles/wars: Vietnam War; International Force East Timor
- Awards: Knight of the Order of Australia; Commander of the Royal Victorian Order; Military Cross; Complete list

General Sir Peter John Cosgrove (born 28 July 1947) is an Australian retired senior Army officer who served as the 26th governor-general of Australia, in office from 2014 to 2019.

A graduate of the Royal Military College, Duntroon, Cosgrove fought in the Vietnam War, receiving the Military Cross in 1971. From 1983 to 1984, he was commander of the 1st Battalion, Royal Australian Regiment, and he later served as commander of the 6th Brigade and the 1st Division. Cosgrove rose to prominence in 1999, when he served as commander of the International Force for East Timor (INTERFET), which oversaw the peacekeeping mission in East Timor during its transition to independence. He is also an alumnus of National Defence College, India.

Cosgrove was Australia's Chief of Army from 2000 to 2002 and Chief of the Defence Force from 2002 to 2005, receiving corresponding promotions to lieutenant general and general. Cosgrove retired from active service following the end of his term as Chief of the Defence Force, and subsequently served as leader of a taskforce helping to rebuild communities in Queensland after Cyclone Larry in 2006. In January 2014, Cosgrove was named to succeed Dame Quentin Bryce as Governor-General of Australia. He was sworn in on 28 March 2014 and made a Knight of the Order of Australia on the same date. Cosgrove retired on 1 July 2019 and was succeeded by General David Hurley.

== Early life and education ==
Viceregal styles of Sir Peter Cosgrove (2014–2019)
- Reference style: His Excellency the Honourable
- Spoken style: Your Excellency

Peter John Cosgrove was born in Randwick, in the Eastern Suburbs of Sydney on 28 July 1947.

He was educated at Waverley College in Sydney, then followed his father, a warrant officer, into the Australian Army by attending the Royal Military College, Duntroon in 1965. Cosgrove's uncle, Bill Cosgrove, was a professional Australian rules football player, but was killed in action while serving with the Royal Australian Air Force during World War II.

Cosgrove spent time in Waverley College's Cadet Unit, as Adjutant CUO P. Cosgrove. He tied for the Major General JA Chapman Cane for the most efficient cadet in the unit. Years later the cadet unit has named an award after Cosgrove, the General Cosgrove Shield, each year to honour the achievements of the most senior ranking officer to graduate.

== Military service ==
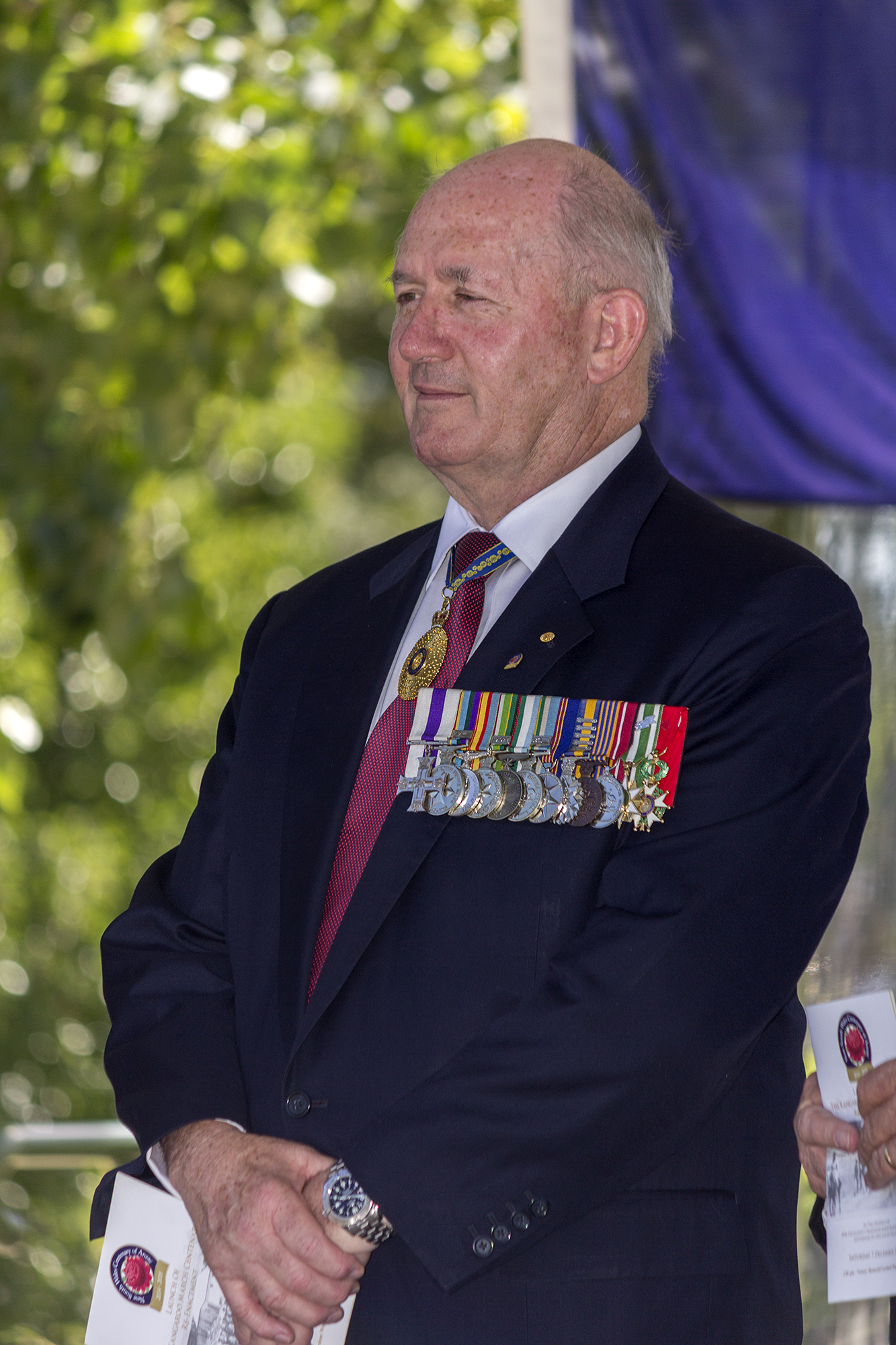
Cosgrove at the Centenary of the Kangaroo March launch in 2013

Cosgrove was appointed a probationary second lieutenant in August 1968 while attached to a regular army unit, and was commissioned a lieutenant on 11 December 1968. He was allotted to the Royal Australian Infantry. He arrived in South Vietnam on 3 August 1969 and was posted to 9th Battalion, Royal Australian Regiment on 20 August 1969. On 10 October 1969, Lieutenant Cosgrove was commanding 5 Platoon, B Company. The platoon located an occupied bunker system in an area where, because of the proximity of allied troops, indirect fire support was difficult to obtain. In spite of this, he led his platoon in an assault on the bunkers without indirect fire support, capturing the system and killing and wounding at least four enemy without sustaining any casualties. On 16 October 1969, 5 Platoon located another bunker system occupied by about a platoon of enemy. Lieutenant Cosgrove silently deployed his own platoon for an attack. His assault completely surprised the enemy causing them to flee, abandoning large quantities of food, stores and documents. The following day in the same bunker system a party of enemy approached his right forward section and was engaged by the sentry. Knowing that the remainder of the section was elsewhere on other tasks, Lieutenant Cosgrove ran to the contact area and personally conducted the fight against the enemy. As a result of his actions, two enemy were killed and three weapons and four packs containing rice were captured. He was awarded the Military Cross for these actions.

Cosgrove was promoted to the temporary rank of captain on 21 September 1970, and was appointed an aide-de-camp to the then-Governor-General Paul Hasluck on 20 December 1971. He was promoted to substantive captain on 31 October 1974 (seniority from 13 July), to temporary major on 2 January 1976 and to substantive major on 11 December 1978. In 1980 he was awarded the National Medal, and was promoted to lieutenant-colonel on 7 December 1981. In the mid-1980s he commanded the 1st Battalion, Royal Australian Regiment.

Cosgrove came to national fame in 1999 when, as a major general, he led the international forces (INTERFET) in a peacekeeping mission to East Timor. The mission's success made him one of Australia's most respected and popular military leaders. He returned to Australia in 2000 as Land Commander Australia, was promoted to lieutenant general in July and appointed Chief of the Army and, in 2002, was advanced to general as Chief of the Defence Force.

In 2004, the Foreign Minister Alexander Downer queried the judgement of Federal Police Commissioner Mick Keelty. Following a joint interview with the then Defence Minister Robert Hill, Cosgrove was accused of "playing politics" when he said that, on this occasion, he disagreed with Keelty's point of view. However, Cosgrove expressed strong support for the Police Commissioner in his Australian best selling autobiography, My Story, published in 2006. On 3 July 2005, Cosgrove's three-year appointment as Chief of the Defence Force was completed, and he was succeeded by then-Chief of Air Force Air Marshal Angus Houston.

== Post-military career ==
=== Cyclone Larry Taskforce ===
On 23 March 2006, Cosgrove was selected to lead the Queensland Government taskforce of rebuilding communities damaged by Cyclone Larry, a Category 5 tropical cyclone that devastated the Innisfail region of northern Queensland. "In recognition of the important contribution General Cosgrove made to the community of North Queensland following Cyclone Larry", on 11 October 2008, Queensland Premier Anna Bligh announced that a new residential suburb in the Bohle Plains area of Townsville would be named Cosgrove, formerly the site of an Abattoir for the cattle sale yards next to it.

=== Corporate leadership and community organisations ===
Cosgrove served on the board of Australia's main airline Qantas between July 2005 and January 2014 and is on numerous other boards as chairman or member.

He served as Chancellor of the Australian Catholic University between November 2010 and January 2014.

As of 2014 he was honorary patron of the ACT Veterans Rugby Club and the Rosies Youth Mission.

Cosgrove was appointed as patron to the Australian Volunteer Coast Guard Association in 2015.

In 2005 Cosgrove accepted the role of Patron of the Spirit of Australia Foundation.

== Governor-General ==
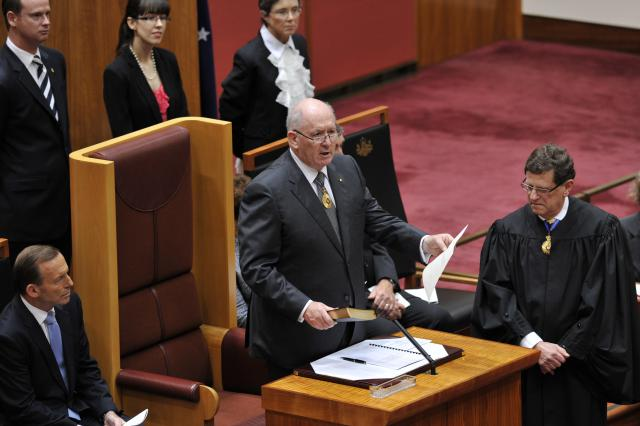
Swearing in as Governor-General

On 28 January 2014, Prime Minister Tony Abbott announced that Queen Elizabeth II had accepted his advice to appoint General Cosgrove as the next Governor-General of Australia, to succeed Dame Quentin Bryce in late March. On 25 March, Abbott announced that the Queen had also approved the reinstatement of the grade of Knight or Dame in the Order of Australia (she had abolished it in 1986 on the advice of Bob Hawke), and that governors-general would be ex officio the Principal Knight or Dame of the Order. The incumbent, Quentin Bryce, was immediately made the first new Dame of the Order. On 28 March, Cosgrove succeeded Dame Quentin and was sworn in as Governor-General by Chief Justice Robert French, becoming Sir Peter Cosgrove. Former headmaster of Waverley College, Ray Paxton, states "In choosing Sir Peter Cosgrove for Governor General, Australia has honoured a remarkable man". During his time as Governor-General, Sir Peter Cosgrove was a supporter for the Lung Foundation Australia.

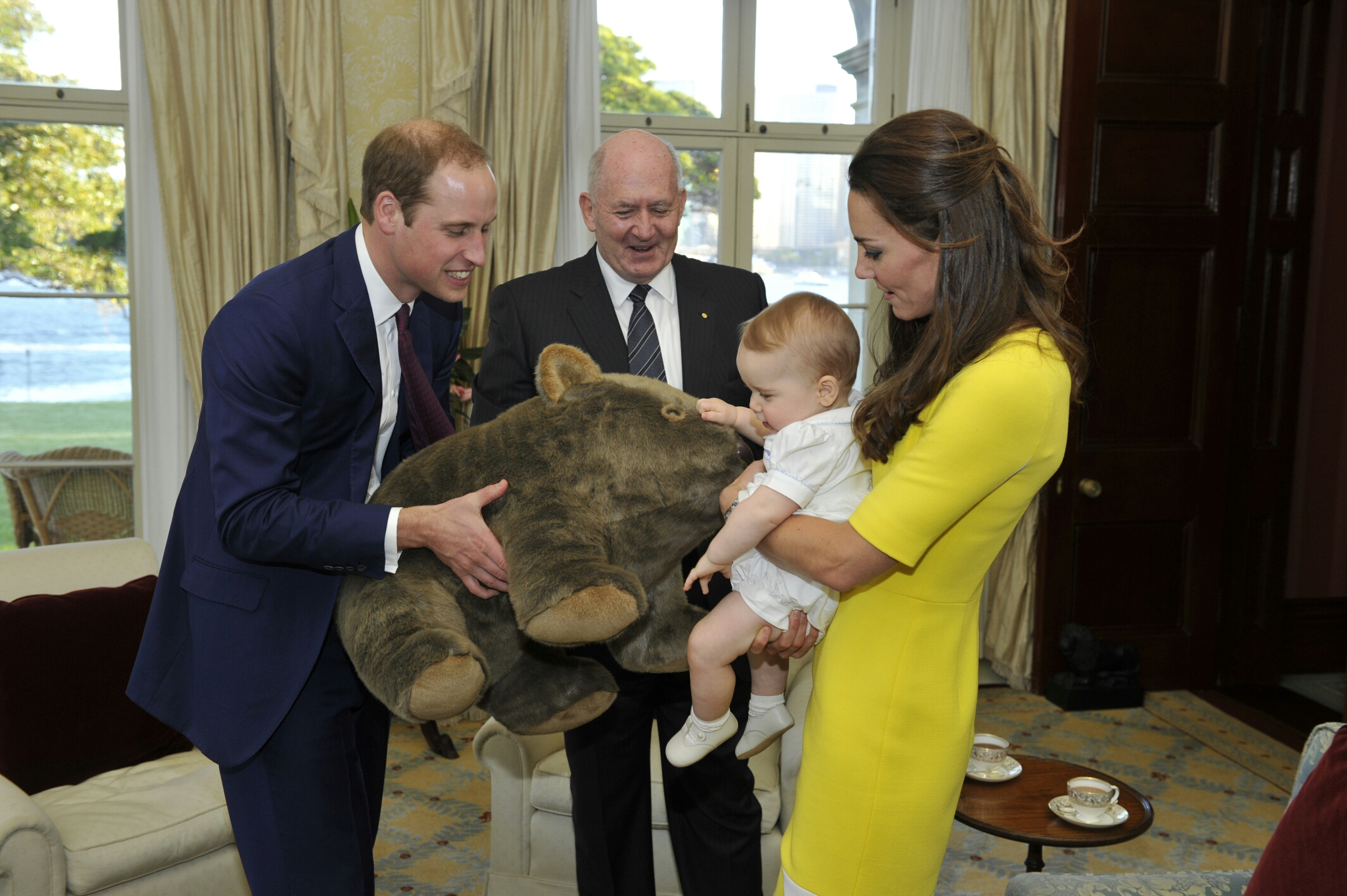
Prince George with his parents and Sir Peter Cosgrove at Admiralty House, Sydney, April 2014

On 16 December 2018, Prime Minister Scott Morrison announced that The Queen had approved the appointment of retired General David Hurley, the current Governor of New South Wales, as the next Governor-General of Australia, commencing in July 2019, and that Cosgrove's term would be extended until that time to ensure smooth transitions following the New South Wales election in March and federal election expected in May 2019.

On 12 August 2019, during a post-appointment call upon the Queen, Cosgrove was appointed a Commander of the Royal Victorian Order.

During the Coronation of Charles III and Camilla, with the Governor-General of Australia and all of the state governors in London, Cosgrove served as the Administrator of the Commonwealth from 30 April to 10 May 2023.

== Personal life ==
Cosgrove married Lynne Payne in 1976, and they have three sons.

His memoir, You shouldn't have joined ..., was published by Allen & Unwin in 2020.

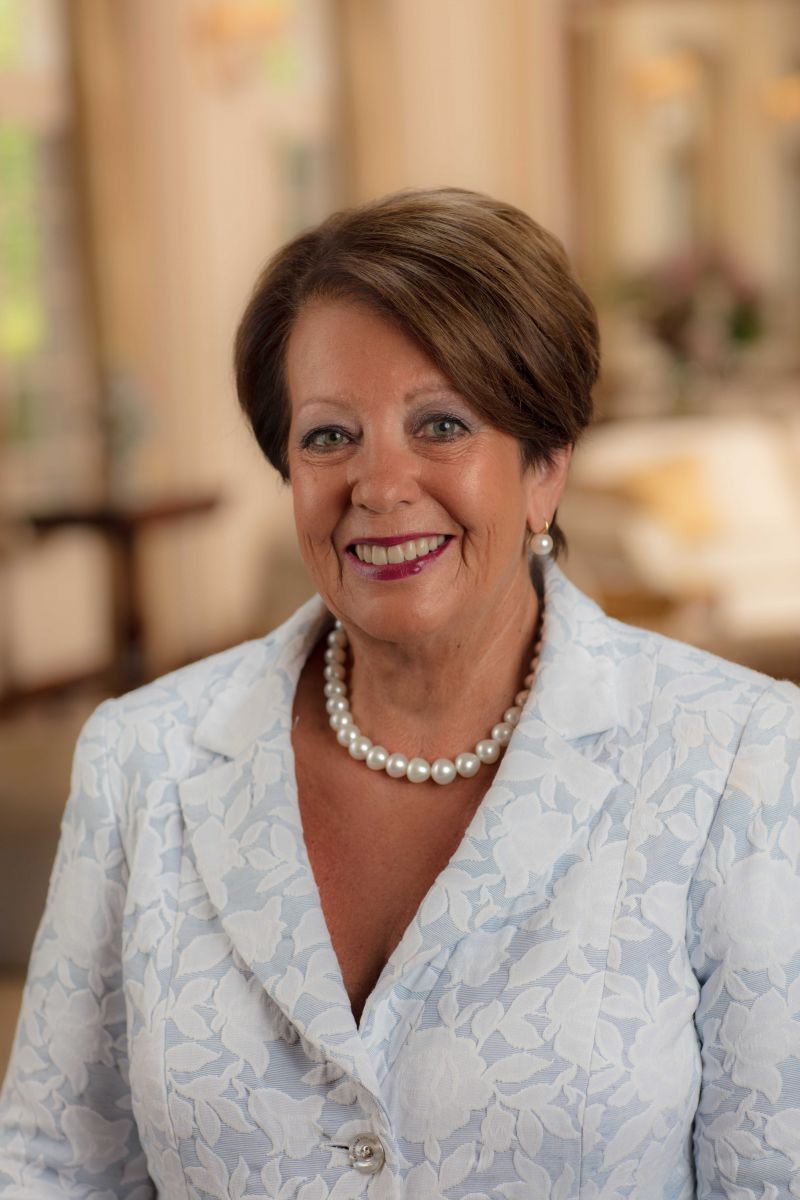
Lady Cosgrove in 2017

== Honours and awards ==

Knight of the Order of Australia (AK)	28 March 2014	
Companion of the Order of Australia (AC)	25 March 2000 (Military division)	For eminent service to the Australian Defence Force as the Commander of the International Force East Timor
Member of the Order of Australia (AM)	26 January 1985 (Military division)	In recognition of service as Commanding Officer 1st Battalion, The Royal Australian Regiment
Commander of the Royal Victorian Order (CVO)	12 August 2019	
Military Cross (MC)	12 February 1971	Infantry – 9 RAR – Vietnam
Knight of the Order of St John	28 March 2014	
Australian Active Service Medal 1945–1975		with Vietnam clasp
Vietnam Medal		
Australian Active Service Medal		with East Timor clasp
International Force East Timor Medal		(INTERFET)
Australian Service Medal 1945–1975		
Centenary Medal	1 January 2001	For service to Australian society as Chief of the Defence Force
Defence Force Service Medal with Federation Star		40–44 years service
National Medal	16 October 1980	For diligent long service to the community in hazardous circumstances, including in times of emergency and national disaster, in direct protection of life and property
Australian Defence Medal		
Vietnam Campaign Medal		Republic of Vietnam
Companion of the New Zealand Order of Merit	5 June 2000	New Zealand
Commander of the Legion of Merit		United States
Tong-il Medal of the Order of National Security Merit		South Korea
Officer of the Legion of Honour		France
Grand Cross of the Order of Prince Henry	28 May 2002	Portugal
Distinguished Service Order	7 September 2004	Singapore
Collar of the Order of Timor-Leste	30 August 2009	Timor-Leste
Knight Grand Cross of the Order of St. Gregory the Great	7 February 2013	Holy See
Knight Grand Cross of the Order of the Crown of Tonga	3 July 2015	Tonga
Collar of the Order of the Liberator General San Martín	9 August 2016	Argentina
Grand Cross of the Order of Liberty	6 July 2018	Portugal
Infantry Combat Badge		
Other awards
Australian of the Year	26 January 2001	He accepted his Australian of the Year award on behalf of all those Australians who served in East Timor: "I did a lot of the talking, they did all the working."

=== Honorary appointments ===
- (Australia) 2022–2025: Patron of the Australian Defence Force Cadets
- (Australia) 2014–2019: Colonel-in-Chief of the Royal Australian Army Medical Corps
- (Australia) 2014–2019: Colonel of the Regiment of the Royal Australian Regiment
- 2014–2019: Chief Scout of Australia
- (United Kingdom) 2014–2019: Prior of the Order of St John

=== Honorary degrees ===
Victoria:

- 2016 Doctor of Laws (honoris causa), Monash University

=== Named in his honour ===
- the suburb of Cosgrove in the City of Townsville, Queensland
- The Cosgrove Centre, Waverley College, Sydney, New South Wales

== See also ==
- List of governors-general of Australia
- List of Australian of the Year Award recipients

Military offices
Preceded by Admiral Chris Barrie	Chief of the Defence Force; 2002–2005	Succeeded by Air Chief Marshal Angus Houston
Preceded by Lieutenant General Frank Hickling	Chief of Army; 2000–2002	Succeeded by Lieutenant General Peter Leahy
Preceded by Major General John Hartley	Land Commander Australia; 2000	Succeeded by Major General Peter Abigail
Preceded by Major General Tim Ford	Commander 1st Division; 1998–1999	Succeeded by Major General Jim Molan
Preceded by Lieutenant Colonel Barry Caligari	Commanding Officer of the 1st Battalion, Royal Australian Regiment; 1983–1984	Succeeded by Lieutenant Colonel John McAloney
Awards
Preceded by Sir Gustav Nossal	Australian of the Year Award; 2001	Succeeded by Patrick Rafter
Academic offices
Preceded by Brother Julian McDonald	Chancellor of the Australian Catholic University; 2005–2014	Succeeded by Ted Exell; Acting
Non-profit organization positions
Preceded by Major General Adrian Clunies-Ross	Chairman of the Australian War Memorial Council; 2007–2012	Succeeded by Rear Admiral Ken Doolan
Government offices
Preceded by Dame Quentin Bryce	Governor-General of Australia; 2014–2019	Succeeded by David Hurley
