= Peter Abigail =

Australian Army officer (born 1948)

- Born: 6 April 1948 (age 78); Sydney, New South Wales
- Military career
- Allegiance: Australia
- Branch: Australian Army
- Service years: 1965–2002
- Rank: Major General
- Commands: Land Commander Australia (2000–02); Deputy Chief of Army (1998–2000); South Pacific Peacekeeping Force (1994); 3rd Brigade (1993–94); 3rd Battalion, Royal Australian Regiment (1986–87)
- Conflicts: Vietnam War; Operation Lagoon
- Awards: Officer of the Order of Australia
- Other work: Executive Director, Australian Strategic Policy Institute (2005–2011)

Major General Peter John Abigail, AO (born 6 April 1948) is a retired Australian Army officer who held a number of senior commands, including Deputy Chief of Army (1998–2000) and Land Commander Australia (2000–2002). Following his retirement from the army, Abigail served as the Executive Director of the Australian Strategic Policy Institute from 2005 until 2011. He also served as a member of the three-person Ministerial Advisory Panel for the 2009 Defence White Paper.

== Early life and background ==
Abigail was born on 6 April 1948 in Sydney, New South Wales, to William Henry Abigail and his wife Catherine (née Kepper).

== Military career ==
Abigail spent 37 years in the army, being awarded the National Medal in 1981. Following promotion to major general in December 1996, he served in a range of senior leadership appointments.

As Assistant Chief of the Defence Force (Policy and Strategic Guidance) and then Head Strategic Policy and Plans (Australian Defence Headquarters) (1996–1998) he was responsible for key aspects of Defence policy, military strategy and capability development.

As Deputy Chief of Army (1998–2000) he was responsible for managing the army and its interaction with other Defence stakeholders. Abigail was appointed an Officer of the Order of Australia (AO) in 2000 for distinguished service to the Australian Defence Force and to the Australian Army in high level staff appointments.

In his final appointment, as Land Commander Australia (2000–2002), he commanded all of the army's operational forces, full-time and reserves, including those that were committed to operations in East Timor, Bougainville and Afghanistan. Abigail retired from the army in 2002.

== Business career and later life ==
In 2003, Abigail formed a private company, Peter Abigail & Associates Pty Limited, specialising in strategic consultancy services. In April 2005 Abigail was appointed as Executive Director of the Australian Strategic Policy Institute, and served until 2011.

Military offices
Preceded by Major General Peter Cosgrove	Land Commander Australia; 2000–2002	Succeeded by Major General David Hurley
Preceded by Major General John Hartley	Deputy Chief of Army; 1998–2000	Succeeded by Major General Peter Leahy
