= Peter Leahy =

Australian general

Peter Francis Leahy
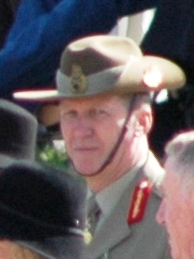
- Leahy at the 2008 National Anzac Day service, Canberra.
- Born: 30 October 1952 (age 73); Melbourne, Victoria
- Allegiance: Australia
- Branch: Australian Army
- Service years: 1971–2008
- Rank: Lieutenant General
- Commands: Chief of Army (2002–08); Deputy Chief of Army (2000–02); 3rd Brigade (1997–98); 8th/9th Battalion, Royal Australian Regiment (1990–92)
- Awards: Companion of the Order of Australia

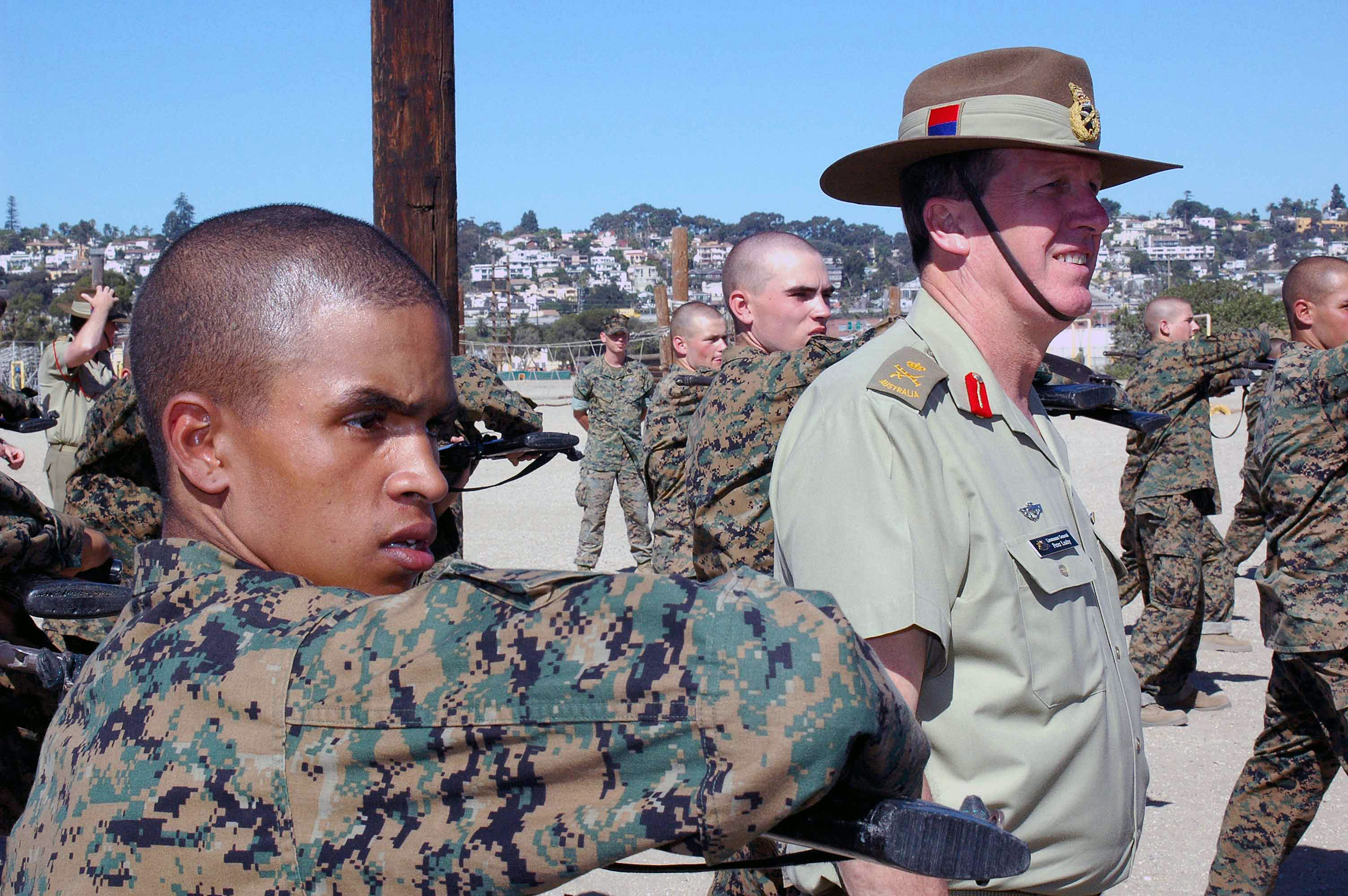
Leahy walks among recruits during his visit to Marine Corps Recruit Depot San Diego, California, in 2004.

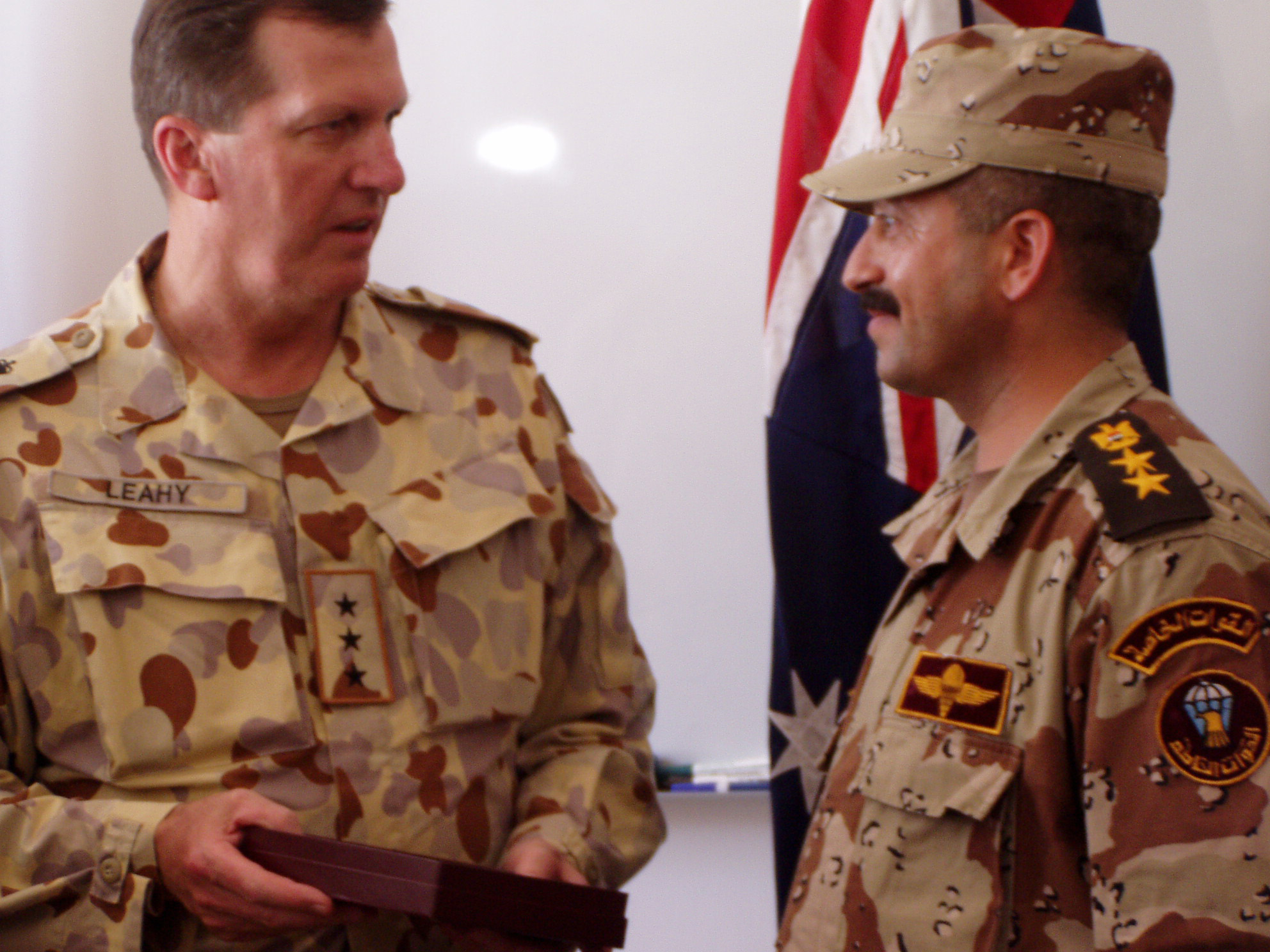
Leahy, left, presents an award to Iraqi Colonel Mohammed Fa'ek Raouf in July 2005. U.S. Army photo

Lieutenant General Peter Francis Leahy, AC (born 30 October 1952) is a retired senior officer of the Australian Army, whose military career culminated with his appointment as Chief of the Army from 2002 until 2008. He has been director of the National Security Institute, University of Canberra, since October 2008.

== Early life ==
Leahy was born in Melbourne, Victoria, on 30 October 1952. He entered the Royal Military College, Duntroon in 1971, graduating with a Bachelor of Arts in Military Studies in 1974 and being commissioned into the Royal Australian Infantry Corps.

== Military career ==
Leahy's early career included instructional duties at the Officer Cadet School, Portsea and command of a company of Gurkha soldiers during an exchange posting with 10th Princess Mary's Own Gurkha Rifles in Hong Kong. Over a three-year period he was a student and an instructor at the United States Army Command and General Staff College at Fort Leavenworth, Kansas. Later in his career he was the Commanding Officer of the 8th/9th Battalion, Royal Australian Regiment, Military Assistant to the Chief of the General Staff, Director of Army Research and Analysis, Commander of the 3rd Brigade, Chief of Staff of Headquarters Australian Theatre and Deputy Chief of Army.

=== Chief of Army ===
Leahy was promoted to lieutenant general and appointed Chief of Army on 28 June 2002. His appointment was extended by a further three years in June 2005, and he retired from the Army on 3 July 2008. Leahy is the longest serving incumbent of the position since General Sir Harry Chauvel in the 1920s, and the only Chief of Army with no operational service in a theatre of war. His honours and awards represent distinguished, long and overseas exchange service not involving combat or operational duties. While he often visited Australian troops deployed on combat duties overseas during his time as Chief of Army he was never himself posted to the force establishment of any operational unit.

In 1995, Leahy was appointed a Member of the Order of Australia (AM), and in 2002 was upgraded to Officer (AO). In the 2007 Queen's Birthday Honours List, he was elevated to Companion (AC), He was recognised internationally with the award of the United States of America Legion of Merit in the rank of Commander, the Republic of Singapore Meritorious Service Medal (Military), the Cambodian Royal Order of Sahametrei in the rank of Commander, the Malaysian Armed Forces Order for Valour in the rank of Gallant Commander

== Staff Check Pty Ltd ==
Fourteen months prior to Leahy's retirement as Chief of the Army, a company at which Leahy's wife was a director (Staff Check Pty Ltd), was awarded a federal government contract by the Department of Defence. The company had been registered in November 2003, with Leahy's wife named a director one month later. The company was awarded Commonwealth contracts for the first time during the final 14 months in which Leahy was still in his role as Chief of the Army, and made $2.2M from those tenders during that period.

Leahy responded to questions by MichaelWestMedia about the contracts, saying; "While I was Chief of Army all relevant conflict of interest processes were followed.” His wife responded by saying; “Staff Check has always had in place procedures to manage any possible conflict of interest. Staff Check completed all the required processes for every tender process that was entered into for the provision of security vetting services. All Defence requirements were met.”

As of August 2020, Staff Check has been awarded $38M in government contracts, with most of those government coming from the Department of Defence ($33M) and the Department of Foreign Affairs and Trade ($3.7M).

== Post-military ==
On 19 September 2008, Leahy joined the board of Codan. On 7 October 2008, he joined the staff of the University of Canberra as a Professor and foundation director of the National Security Institute. On 4 May 2009 he joined the board of Electro Optic Systems Holdings Ltd. He is Chairman of the North Queensland Defence Advisory Board, a member of the First Principles Review of the Department of Defence and in November 2014 was appointed to the board of Citadel Group Limited. In work related to charities he is Chairman of the Board for the wounded veterans charity Soldier On, Chairman of the Australian International Military Games, the organisation that will bring the Invictus Games to Sydney in 2018, and serves on the Salvation Army Red Shield Appeal Committee in the Australian Capital Territory.

In September 2014, Peter Leahy was formally inducted as an Honorary Fellow of the Australian Institute of Building (HonFAIB) by the Governor General of Australia, Sir Peter Cosgrove. In February 2018, the Governor of New South Wales, David Hurley, formally promulgated the election of Leahy as a Fellow of the Royal Society of New South Wales in the NSW Government Gazette.

As of 2018, Leahy was the patron of the Military Historical Society of Australia, having taken over from retired Air Marshal Barry Gration.

== Qualifications ==
- Bachelor of Arts in Military Studies, University of New South Wales at the Royal Military College, Duntroon
- Master of Military Arts and Science, United States Army Command and General Staff College
- Fellow, Australian Centre for Defence and Strategic Studies
- Graduate, Australian Institute of Company Directors
- Graduate, Australian Army Command and Staff College
- Graduate, Higher Command and Staff Course
- Graduate, United States Army Command and General Staff College

== Personal ==
Leahy is married to Lee and they have three sons. He enjoys most sports and reading.

Military offices
Preceded by Lieutenant General Peter Cosgrove	Chief of Army; 2002–2008	Succeeded by Lieutenant General Ken Gillespie
Preceded by Major General Peter Abigail	Deputy Chief of Army; 2000–2002	Succeeded by Major General Frank Roberts
