= Peter Arnison =

Australian Army officer

Major General The Honourable Peter Arnison AC, CVO
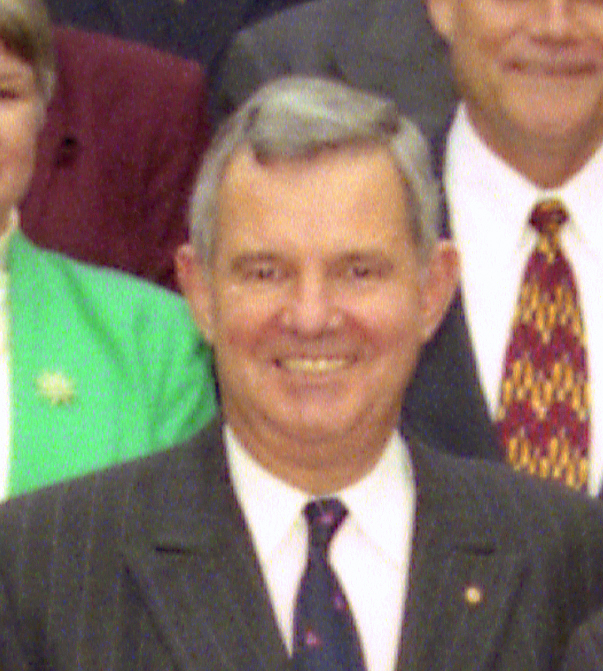

23rd Governor of Queensland
- In office 29 July 1997 – 29 July 2003
- Monarch: Elizabeth II
- Premier: Rob Borbidge; Peter Beattie
- Preceded by: Leneen Forde
- Succeeded by: Quentin Bryce

Personal details
- Born: 21 October 1940 (age 85) Lismore, New South Wales

Military service
- Allegiance: Australia
- Branch/service: Australian Army
- Years of service: 1959–1996
- Rank: Major General
- Commands: Land Commander Australia (1994–96); 1st Division (1991–94); 3rd Brigade (1987–88); Land Warfare Centre (1985–86); 5th/7th Battalion, Royal Australian Regiment (1981–82)
- Battles/wars: Vietnam War
- Awards: Companion of the Order of Australia; Commander of the Royal Victorian Order

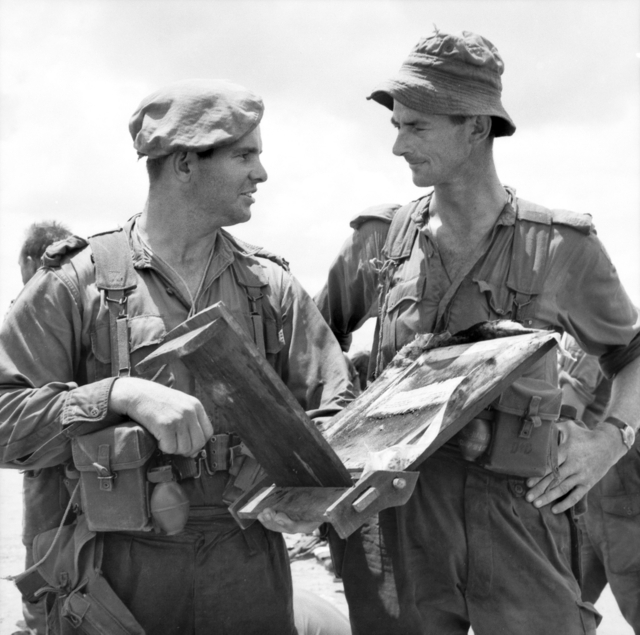
Captain Peter Arnison (left) and Major Ian McFarlane of the 1st Battalion, Royal Australian Regiment on their return from a battalion strength operation in Biên Hòa, Vietnam, in July 1965.

Major General Peter Maurice Arnison, AC, CVO (born 21 October 1940) is a retired Australian Army officer who served as the 23rd Governor of Queensland, in office from July 1997 until July 2003. He graduated from the Royal Military College, Duntroon in 1962, and served as Land Commander Australia from 1994 until he retired from the Australian Army in 1996.

For the year prior to his appointment as governor, Arnison was the executive director of Allied Rubber Products, a manufacturing firm. He is a former Chancellor of Queensland University of Technology, and is Chairman of Panbio Limited, Chairman of the Centre for Military and Veterans' Health, Director of Energex Limited, Governor of the Queensland Community Foundation, and on the board of directors of the Australian Multicultural Foundation.

== Personal ==
Arnison is married to Barbara.

== Education, appointments, honours and awards ==
Bachelor of Economics
D Laws University of Queensland
D Univ Queensland University of Technology
D Univ Griffith University
D Letters University of Southern Queensland
D Univ Southern Cross University
Fellow of the Australian Institute of Company Directors

July 1977 National Medal
January 1992 Officer of the Order of Australia (AO)
1994 Land Commander Australia (LCAUST)
June 1996 Executive Director, Allied Rubber Products
July 1997 Queensland’s 23rd Governor
January 2001 Centenary Medal
March 2001 Companion of the Order of Australia (AC)
March 2002 Commander of the Royal Victorian Order (CVO)
December 2004 Non-executive Director, ENERGEX Limited

Chair, Network and Technical Committee, ENERGEX Limited
Member, Audit and Compliance Committee, ENERGEX Limited
Chancellor of Queensland University of Technology
Chairman of The Centre for Military and Veterans' Health
Director of the Australian Multicultural Foundation
Chairman of Panbio Limited
Chairman, Communities Future Task Force

September 2009 re-elected Chancellor of Queensland University of Technology (QUT)
January 2011 Appointed Chairman of the Flood Response Review Board in Brisbane

Military offices
Preceded by Major General Arthur Fittock	Commander 1st Division; 1991–1994	Succeeded by Major General Michael Keating
Preceded by Major General Murray Blake	Land Commander Australia; 1994–1996	Succeeded by Major General Frank Hickling
Government offices
Preceded by Leneen Forde	Governor of Queensland; 1997–2003	Succeeded by Quentin Bryce
Academic offices
Preceded by	Chancellor of Queensland University of Technology; 2004–2012	Succeeded by Tim Fairfax
