= Combat Training Centre (Australia) =

Training establishment under the Australian Army's Forces Command

- Active: 1942 – present
- Country: Australia
- Branch: Australian Army
- Type: Collective training
- Part of: Forces Command
- Garrison/HQ: Lavarack Barracks, Townsville, Queensland
- Motto(s): Know yourself, know your enemy, know your environment
- Abbreviation: CTC

The Combat Training Centre (CTC) traces its origins back to 3 November 1942, when Army Headquarters ordered the formation of a Land Headquarters Training Centre (Jungle Warfare) at Canungra.

== Role ==
CTC provides collective training exercises to Australian Army units, often as a component of pre-deployment training, prior to the recipient unit deploying overseas on in support of current Australian operations.

CTC consists of the following wings:

- Combat Training Centre – Live (CTC-L) enables the delivery of advanced field training exercises to Battle Group or Combat Team sized units.
- Combat Training Centre – Battle Command (CTC-BC) focuses on the delivery of training activities for Brigade level Headquarter elements. These activities are generally conducted as Command Post exercises, without troops in the field.
- Combat Training Centre - Jungle Training Wing (CTC-JTW) is located in Tully, Queensland and are the Australian Army's specialists in jungle warfare, with their primary mission being to deliver basic and advanced jungle warfare training to dismounted Combat Team sized organisations. Most of the Combat Teams that complete a Sub-Unit Training (SUT) rotation at JTW are infantry rifle companies from within the Royal Australian Regiment. JTW not only provides this training to Australian Army units but also to allied Army units, including, but not limited to, the US, Indonesia and the Philippines. JTW also conducts the Junior Officer's Jungle Operations Course (JOJOC) training course as well as training in visual tracking.
