= Forces Command (Australia) =

Single command for all land functions within the Australian Defence Force

- Active: 1 July 2009 – present
- Country: Australia
- Part of: Australian Army
- Garrison/HQ: Victoria Barracks, Sydney
- March: "Cloak and Dagger"

Commanders
- Current commander: Major General Ana Duncan
- Chief of the Army: Lieutenant General Simon Stuart

Forces Command (FORCOMD) is a command within the Australian Army responsible for the combat brigades, the enabling and training formations reporting to the chief of Army with approximately 85% of the Army's personnel. The command was formed on 1 July 2009 with the amalgamation of Land Command and Training Command, and is led by a major general as the Commander Forces Command (COMD FORCOMD).

== History ==
On 27 September 2008 the Chief of Army, Lieutenant General Ken Gillespie, announced a restructure of the army command structure named Adaptive Army. The structure had remained nearly the same since the Hassett Review restructure in 1973 of Land Command and Training Command.

In October 2022, the 9th Brigade was placed under the command of Forces Command. In July 2023, the 1st, 3rd and 7th Brigades were placed under the command of the 1st (Australian) Division. The Combat Training Centre and 39th Operational Support Battalion were placed under the command of Forces Command.

On June 30, 2024, the 8th Brigade was placed under the command of Forces Command. The 17th Sustainment Brigade was transferred from Forces Command to the 1st Division on 15 November 2024. The 6th Brigade was disbanded on 13 December 2024, with its units being transferred to other headquarters.

== Organisation ==
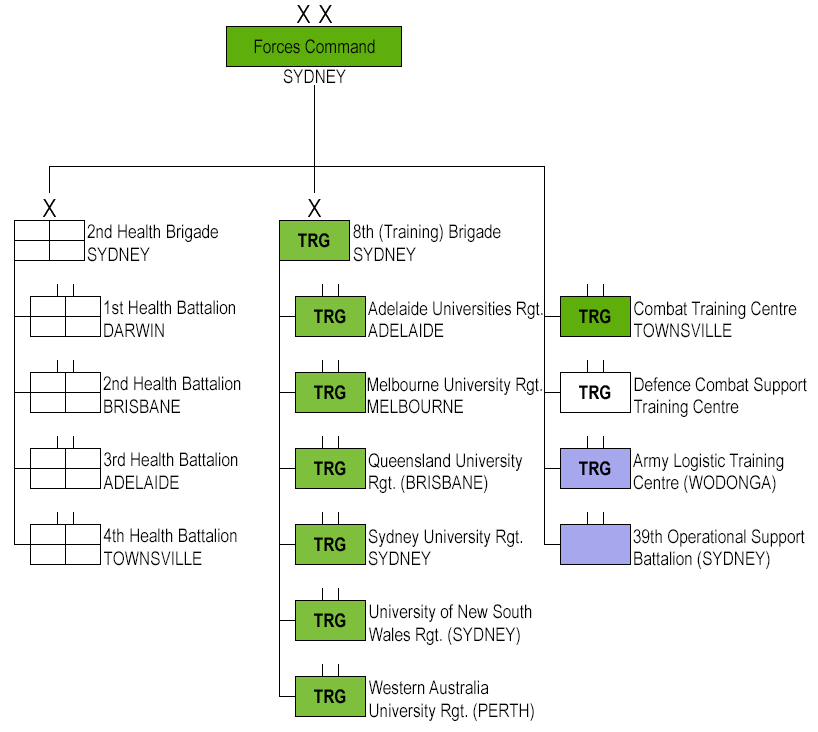
Forces Command organization 2025

- Headquarters, Forces Command (Victoria Barracks, New South Wales)
  - 2nd Health Brigade
  - 8th Brigade
  - 39th Operational Support Battalion (Randwick Barracks, NSW)
  - Royal Military College of Australia (Duntroon Garrison, ACT)
  - Army Logistic Training Centre (Bandiana, Vic)
  - Defence Command Support Training Centre
  - Combat Training Centre
  - Combined Arms Training Centre (Puckapunyal, Vic)

== Commander Forces Command ==
The following have held the position of Commander Forces Command or its preceding positions, with the ranks and honours as at the completion of their tenure:

Rank	Name	Post-nominals	Term began	Term ended
Field Force Command
Major General	Kenneth Mackay	CB, MBE	1973	1974
Major General	Donald Dunstan	CB, CBE	1974	1977
Major General	Mark Bradbury	AO, CBE	1977	1979
Major General	John Williamson	AO, OBE	1979	1980
Major General	Ron Grey	AO, DSO	1980	1983
Major General	John Kelly	AO, DSO	1983	1984
Major General	Lawrence O'Donnell	AO	1985	1986
Land Commander Australia
Major General	Lawrence O'Donnell	AO	1986	1987
Major General	Neville Smethurst	AO, MBE	1987	1990
Major General	Murray Blake	AO, MC	1990	1994
Major General	Peter Arnison	AO	1994	1996
Major General	Frank Hickling	AO, CSC	1996	1998
Major General	John Hartley	AO	1998	2000
Major General	Peter Cosgrove	AC, MC	March 2000	July 2000
Major General	Peter Abigail	AO	July 2000	December 2002
Major General	David Hurley	AO, DSC	December 2002	December 2003
Major General	Ken Gillespie	AO, DSC, CSM	January 2004	July 2005
Major General	Mark Kelly	AO	July 2005	December 2008
Major General	David Morrison	AM	December 2008	July 2009
Commander Forces Command
Major General	David Morrison	AO	July 2009	June 2011
Major General	Jeffrey Sengelman	DSC, AM, CSC	June 2011	November 2011
Major General	Michael Slater	AO, DSC, CSC	November 2011	23 January 2015
Major General	Gus Gilmore	AO, DSC	23 January 2015	December 2016
Major General	Gus McLachlan	AO	December 2016	December 2018
Major General	Greg Bilton	AM, CSC	December 2018	June 2019
Major General	Chris Field	AM, CSC	June 2019	February 2020
Major General	Matt Pearse	AM	February 2020	November 2022
Major General	Susan Coyle	AM, CSC, DSM	November 2022	30 June 2024
Brigadier	Nathan Juchniewicz (Acting)	DSC & Bar, CSC	30 June 2024	January 2025
Major General	Ana Duncan	AM, CSC	January 2025	Incumbent
