= 39th Operational Support Battalion =

Logistics and administrative unit of the Australian Army

- Active: 2006 – present
- Country: Australia
- Branch: Army
- Type: Administration
- Size: Battalion
- Part of: Forces Command
- Garrison/HQ: Randwick Barracks, Australia

The 39th Operational Support Battalion (39 OSB) is a logistics and administrative unit in the Australian Army, which provides force preparation training and mounting support to individuals and specialist teams for Australian Defence Force operations. 39 OSB also sustains specified operations by providing first line administrative and logistic support to these deployed forces.

The unit was renamed from its former title 39th (Personnel Support) Battalion (39 PSB) on 27 March 2014. 39 PSB was formerly known as the Deployed Forces Support Unit until being formally renamed at a special ceremony on 8 August 2006 at the Shrine of Remembrance in Melbourne.

The unit perpetuates the name of the famous 39th Battalion, an infantry battalion that fought during both World War I and World War II, which played a significant part in the Kokoda Track Campaign in 1942–43, fighting against the Japanese. It is a Tri-Service Direct Command Unit of Forces Command, and is based at Randwick, New South Wales. It currently fills a variety of roles, including providing cultural and language training for soldiers deploying to Africa as part of UN peacekeeping operations.
