= Army Logistic Training Centre =

Training establishment under the Australian Army's Forces Command

- Active: 1995–present
- Country: Australia
- Branch: Australian Army
- Type: Training Establishment
- Role: Logistics corps officer and soldier training
- Size: Six schools
- Part of: Forces Command
- Motto(s): "Excel With Honour"

Insignia
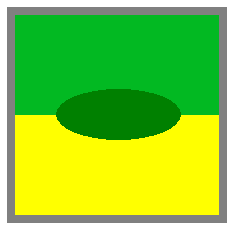
- Unit Colour Patch

The Army Logistic Training Centre (ALTC) is an Australian Army training establishment that is part of Forces Command. Established on 1 December 1995, through the amalgamation of nine separate logistic, health and personnel services schools and the Army College of TAFE, ALTC is headquartered at Bandiana, Victoria, and was established in response to the need to provide more effective logistic training, which had been identified as a problem as early as 1981. ALTC's motto is "Excel with Honour".

== History and structure ==
Upon formation, ALTC combined the previously separate components into "effects-based training divisions" including "integrated logistics, material support, distribution and personnel support" under a headquarters with an operations cell and a development group. According to an article published in the Army News in June 2008, this had the result of "severing corps affiliations" and, as a result, in late 2007 the centre was reorganised into "four corps-aligned trade schools ... [and] two schools of higher education", being the Army School of Logistic Operations, the Army School of Electrical and Mechanical Engineering, the Army School of Transport, the Army School of Ordnance, the Army School of Health and the Australian Defence Force Chaplains College. Each school consists of several different wings or cells each tasked with delivering different training courses and each with their own headquarters elements, while the centre itself has an overarching headquarters that includes development, operations and planning groups. Training is undertaken in four principal locations: Puckapunyal, Victoria; HMAS Cerberus at Crib Point, Victoria; Ross Island Barracks in Townsville, Queensland, and the Albury-Wodonga Military Area (AWMA).

Within the AWMA, the ALTC is spread across several bases including Latchford Barracks at Bonegilla, and Gaza Ridge Barracks and Wadsworth Barracks at Bandiana. ALTC's School of Army Health previously operated out of Portsea, but is now based in the AWMA.

Soldiers and officers from the Army's logistics corps – the Royal Australian Electrical and Mechanical Engineers, the Royal Australian Army Ordnance Corps, the Australian Army Catering Corps, the Royal Australian Corps of Transport, the Royal Australian Army Pay Corps, the Royal Australian Army Nursing Corps and the Royal Australian Army Medical Corps – and small numbers of Royal Australian Navy and Royal Australian Air Force personnel undertake various courses at ALTC as part of their initial employment training, or as part of corps-specific promotion courses. The centre is responsible for training around 5,000 students each year, spread across around 334 different courses, and works closely with civilian training providers such as Wodonga TAFE, Monash University and RMIT, to provide nationally recognised qualifications to military personnel. Upon completion of employment training graduating members are posted to various combat, combat support and service support units.
