= Australian Army =

Land warfare branch of the Australian Defence Force

- Rising Sun badge
- Founded: 1 March 1901 (125 years, 8 months)
- Country: Australia
- Branch: Army
- Role: Land warfare
- Size: 28,524 (Regular); 15,711 (Active Reserve)
- Part of: Australian Defence Force
- March: "The Army March"
- Engagements: Second Boer War; Boxer Rebellion; First World War; Second World War; Korean War; Malayan Emergency; Indonesian Confrontation; Vietnam War; Second Malayan Emergency; 1999 East Timorese crisis; 2006 East Timorese crisis; Regional Assistance Mission to Solomon Islands; War in Afghanistan; Iraq War
- Website: www.army.gov.au

Commanders
- Chief of the Defence Force: Admiral Mark Hammond
- Chief of Army: Lieutenant General Susan Coyle
- Deputy Chief of Army: Major General Chris Smith
- Commander Forces Command: Major General Ana Duncan

Insignia
- Australian flag

- Insignia (aviation)

- Insignia (armoured vehicles)

The Australian Army is the principal land warfare force of Australia. It is a part of the Australian Defence Force (ADF), along with the Royal Australian Navy and the Royal Australian Air Force. The Army is led by the Chief of Army (CA), who is subordinate to the Chief of the Defence Force (CDF) who commands the ADF. The Department of Defence supports the ADF and the Army.

The Australian Army was formed in 1901 as the Commonwealth Military Forces, through the amalgamation of the colonial forces of Australia following the Federation of Australia. Although Australian soldiers have been involved in a number of minor and major conflicts throughout Australia's history, only during the Second World War has Australian territory come under direct attack.

The Australian Army was initially composed almost completely of part-time soldiers, where the vast majority were in units of the Citizens Military Force (CMF or Militia) (1901–1980) during peacetime, with limits set on the regular Army. Since all reservists were barred from forcibly serving overseas, volunteer expeditionary forces (1st AIF, ANMEF, 2nd AIF) were formed to enable the Army to send large numbers of soldiers to serve overseas during periods of war. This period lasted from federation until post-1947, when a standing peacetime regular army was formed and the Australian Army Reserve (1980–present) began to decline in importance.

During its history, the Australian Army has fought in a number of major wars, including the Second Boer War, the First and Second World Wars, Korean War, Malayan Emergency, Indonesia-Malaysia Confrontation, Vietnam War, the War in Afghanistan (2001–2021) and the Iraq War. Since 1947, the Australian Army has also been involved in many peacekeeping operations, usually under the auspices of the United Nations. Today, it participates in multilateral and unilateral military exercises and provides emergency disaster relief and humanitarian aid in response to domestic and international crises.

== History ==
=== Formation ===
Formed in March 1901, following federation, the Australian Army initially consisted of the six, disbanded and separate, colonial military forces' land components. Due to the Army being continuation of the colonial armies, it became immediately embroiled in conflict as contingents had been committed to fight for the United Kingdom of Great Britain and Ireland in the Second Boer War. The Army gained command of these contingents and even supplied federal units to reinforce their commitment at the request of the British government.

The Defence Act 1903, established the operation and command structure of the Australian Army. In 1911, the Universal Service Scheme was implemented, introducing conscription for the first time in Australia, with males aged 14–26 assigned into cadet and CMF units; though the scheme did not prescribe or allow overseas service outside the states and territories of Australia. This restriction would be primarily, and continually, bypassed through the process of raising separate volunteer forces until the mid-20th century; this solution was not without its drawbacks, as it caused logistical dilemmas.

=== World War I ===
After the declaration of war on the Central Powers, the Australian Army raised the all volunteer First Australian Imperial Force (AIF) which had an initial recruitment of 52,561 out of a promised 20,000 men. A smaller expeditionary force, the Australian Naval and Military Expeditionary Force (ANMEF), dealt with the issue of the German Pacific holdings. ANMEF recruitment began on 10 August 1914, and operations started 10 days later. On 11 September, the ANMEF landed at Rabaul to secure German New Guinea, with no German outposts in the Pacific left by November 1914. During the AIF's preparations to depart Australia, the Ottoman Empire joined the Central Powers; thereby receiving declarations of war from the Allies of World War I in early November 1914.

After initial recruitment and training, the AIF departed for Egypt where they underwent further preparations, and where the Australian and New Zealand Army Corps (ANZAC) was formed. Their presence in Egypt was due to the planned Gallipoli campaign, an invasion of the Ottoman Empire via Gallipoli. On 25 April, the AIF landed at ANZAC Cove, which signaled the start of Australia's contribution to the campaign. Following little initial success, fighting quickly devolved into trench warfare, which precipitated a stalemate. On 15 December 1915, after eight months of fighting, the evacuation of Gallipoli commenced; it was completed 5 days later with no casualties recorded. After regrouping in Egypt, the AIF was split into two groups and further expanded with reinforcements. This division would see a majority of the Australian Light Horse fight the Ottomans in Arabia and the Levant, whereas the rest of the AIF would go to the Western Front.

==== Western Front ====
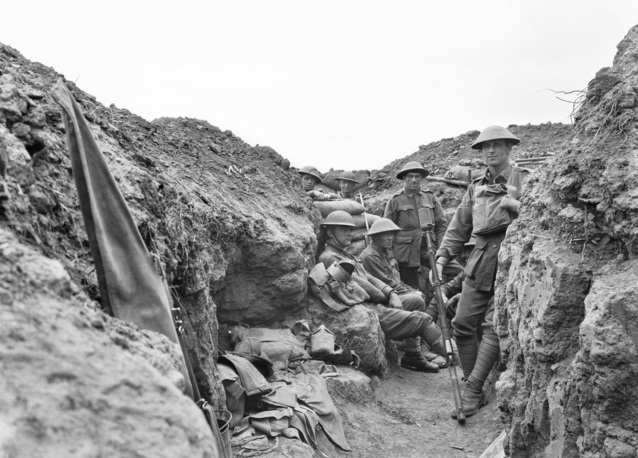
Australian troops on the Western Front, July 1918

The AIF arrived in France with the 1st, 2nd, 4th and 5th Divisions; which comprised, in part, I ANZAC Corps and, in full, II ANZAC Corps. The 3rd Division would not arrive until November 1916, as it underwent training in England after its transfer from Australia. In July 1916, the AIF commenced operations with the Battle of the Somme, and more specifically with the Attack at Fromelles. Soon after, the 1st, 2nd and 4th Divisions became tied down in actions at the Battle of Pozières and Mouquet Farm. In around six weeks, the operations caused 28,000 Australian casualties. Due to these losses and pressure from the United Kingdom to maintain the AIF's manpower, Prime Minister Billy Hughes introduced the first conscription plebiscite. It was defeated by a narrow margin and created a bitter divide on the issue of conscription throughout the 20th century.

Following the German withdrawal to the Hindenburg Line in March 1917, which was better defended and eased manpower restraints, the first Australian assault on the Hindenburg Line occurred on 11 April 1917 with the First Battle of Bullecourt. On 20 September, the Australian contingent joined the Third Battle of Ypres with the Battle of Menin Road, and continued on to fight in the Battle of Polygon Wood, which lasted until 3 October; in total, these tow operations cost roughly 11,000 in Australian casualties. Until 15 November 1917, multiple attacks at the Battle of Broodseinde Ridge and the Battle of Passchendaele occurred, but, failed to take their objectives following the start of the rain and subsequent muddying of the fields.

On 21 March 1918, the Germans attempted a breakout through the Michael Offensive, which was part of the much larger German spring offensive; the AIF suffered 15,000 casualties due to this effort. During this operation, Australian troops conducted a series of local defences and offensives to hold and retake Villers–Brettoneux over the period 4 to 25 April 1918. After the cessation of offensives by the German Army, the Australian Corps began participating in "Peaceful penetration" operations, which were localised raids designed to harass and gain small tracts of territory; these proved so effective that several major operational objectives were captured.

On 4 July 1918, the Battle of Hamel saw the first successful use of tanks alongside Australians, with the battleplan of John Monash completed three minutes over the planned 90 minute operation. Following this success, the Battle of Amiens was launched on 8 August 1918, in conjunction with the Canadian Corps and the British III Corps, and concluded on 12 August 1918; General Erich Ludendorff described it as "the black day of the German Army". On 29 August 1918, following territorial advances and pursuits, the AIF attacked Pèronne and subsequently initiated the Battle of Mont St Quentin. Another operation around Épehy was planned for 18 September 1918, which aimed to retake the British trenches and, potentially, capture their most ambitious objective of the Hindenburg's outpost line – which they achieved.

Following news of a three-month furlough for certain soldiers, seven AIF battalions were disbanded; consequently, members of these battalions mutinied. Soon after the penetration of the Hindenburg Line, plans for the breakthrough of the main trench, with the Australian Corps as the vanguard, were completed. However, due to manpower issues, only the 3rd and 5th Divisions participated, with the American Expeditionary Forces' 27th and 30th Divisions given as reinforcements. On 29 September, following a three day long bombardment, the Battle of the Hindenburg Line commenced, wherein the corps attacked and captured more of the line. On 5 October 1918, after furious fighting, the Australian Corps was withdrawn from the front, as the entire corps had been operating continuously since 8 August 1918. They would not return to the battlefield, as Germany signed the Armistice of 11 November 1918 that ultimately ended the war on the Western Front.

==== Middle East ====
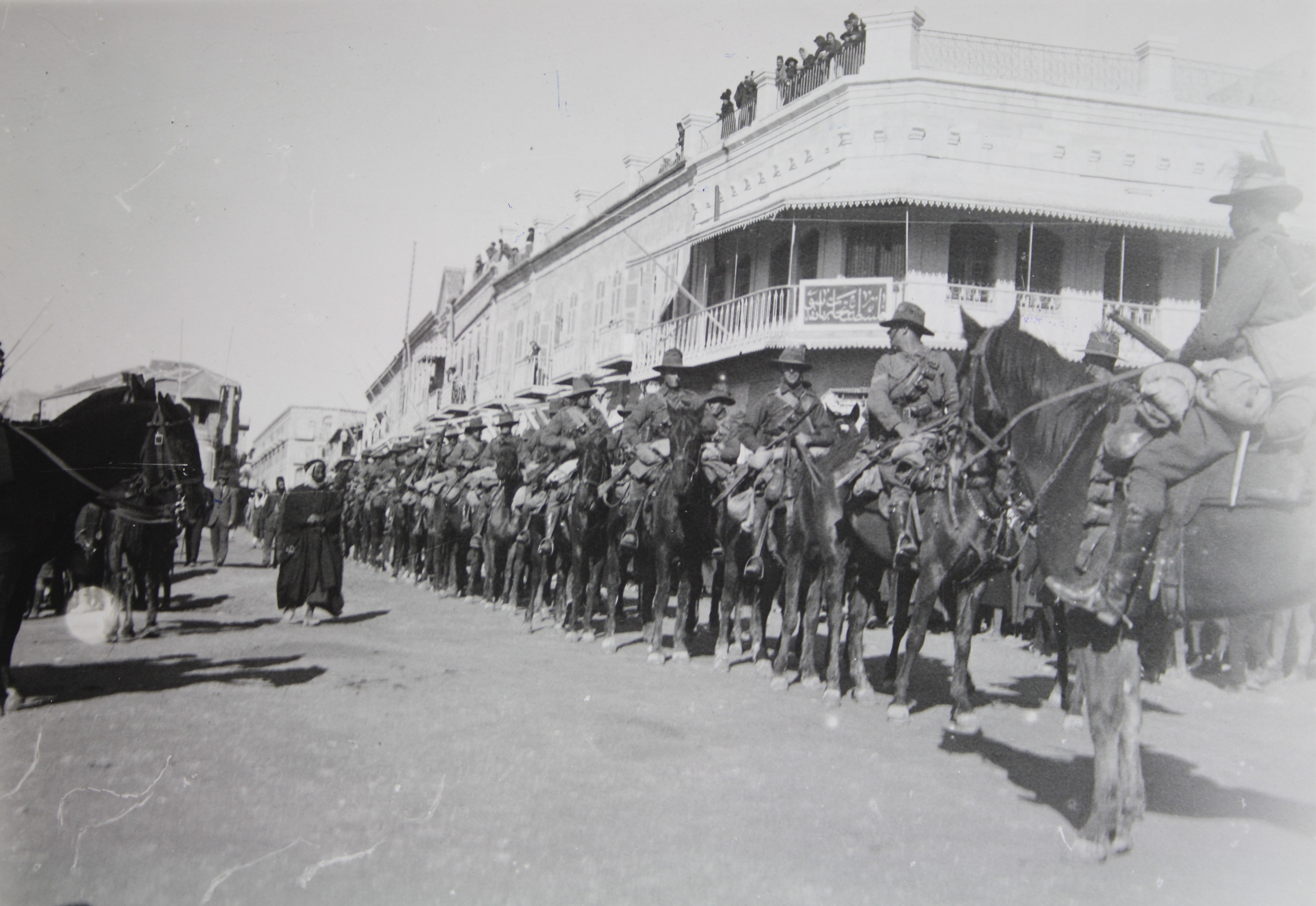
Australian light horse unit in Jerusalem during WWI

The Australian mounted units, composed of the ANZAC Mounted Division and eventually the Australian Mounted Division, participated in the Sinai and Palestine campaign. They were originally stationed there to protect the Suez Canal from the Turks, and following the threat of its capture passing, they started offensive operations and helped in the re-conquest of the Sinai Desert. This was followed by the Battles of Gaza, wherein on 31 October 1917 the 4th and 12th Light Horse took Beersheba through the last charge of the Light Horse. They continued on to capture Jerusalem on 10 December 1917 and then eventually Damascus on 1 October 1918 whereby, a few days later on 10 October 1918, the Ottoman Empire surrendered.

=== Interbellum ===
Repatriation efforts were implemented between the armistice and the end of 1919, which occurred after the disbandment of the Australian Imperial Force. In 1921, CMF units were renumbered to that of the AIF, to perpetuate the honours and numerical identities of the units involved in WW1. During this period there was a complacency towards matters of defence, due to the devastating effects of the previous war on the Australian psyche. Following the election of Prime Minister James Scullin in 1929, two events occurred that substantially affected the armed forces: conscription was abolished and the economic effects of the Great Depression started to be felt in Australia. The economic ramifications of the depression led to decisions that decreased defence expenditure and manpower for the army. Since conscription was repealed, to reflect the new volunteer nature of the Citizens Forces, the CMF was renamed to the Militia.

=== World War II ===
Following the declaration of war on Nazi Germany and her allies by the United Kingdom, and the subsequent confirmation by Prime Minister Robert Menzies on 3 September 1939, the Australian Army raised the Second Australian Imperial Force, a 20,000-strong volunteer expeditionary force, which initially consisted of the 6th Division; later increased to include the 7th and 9th Divisions, alongside the 8th Division which was sent to Singapore. In October 1939, compulsory military training recommenced for unmarried men aged 21, who had to complete three months of training.

The 2nd AIF commenced its first operations in North Africa with Operation Compass, that began with the Battle of Bardia. This was followed by supplying Australian units to defend against the Axis in the Battle of Greece. After the evacuation of Greece, Australian troops took part in the Battle of Crete which, though more successful, still failed and another withdrawal was ordered. During the Greek Campaign, the Allies were pushed back to Egypt and the Siege of Tobruk began. Tobruk's primary defence personnel were Australians of the 9th Division; the so-called 'Rats of Tobruk'. Additionally, the AIF participated in the Syria–Lebanon campaign. The 9th Division fought in the First and Second Battle of El Alamein before also being shipped home to fight the Japanese.

==== Pacific ====
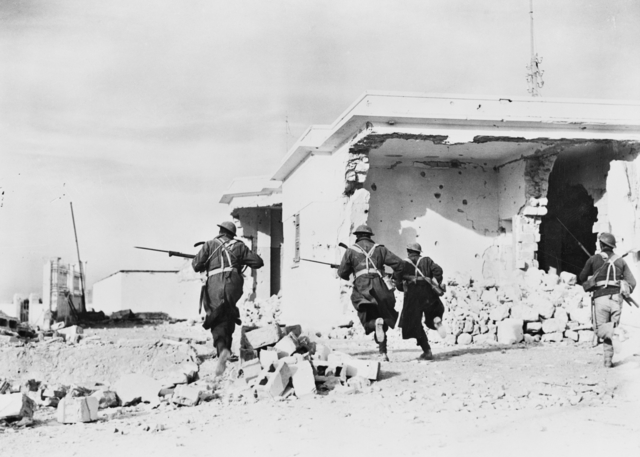
Australian troops enter Bardia, January 1941

In December 1941, following the Bombing of Pearl Harbor, Australia declared war on Japan. Consequently, the AIF was requested to return home, as the subsequent rapid conquest of Southeast Asia extremely concerned Australian policymakers, and the militia was mobilised. After the Fall of Singapore, and the consequent capture of the entire 8th Division as POWs, this concern only grew. These events hastened the relief of the Rats of Tobruk, while the other divisions were immediately recalled to reinforce New Guinea. General conscription was reintroduced, though service was again limited to Australian possessions, which caused tension between the AIF and Militia. This was in addition to the CMF's perceived inferior fighting ability, with these grievances earning the Militia their nicknames of "koalas" (Note: This was because Koalas were a protected species that could not be exported or shot) and "chocos" (Note: This was in the belief that they would melt in the heat of combat) or "chocolate soldiers".

The Imperial Japanese Navy's failure in the Battle of the Coral Sea, was the impetus for the Imperial Japanese Army to try to capture Port Moresby via the Owen Stanley Range. On 21 July 1942, the Japanese began the Kokoda Campaign after landing at Gona; attempts to defeat them by Australian battalions were met with eventual success. Resultant offensive operations concluded with the Japanese being driven out of New Guinea entirely. In parallel with these defences, the Battle of Milne Bay was waged, and when the Japanese were repulsed, it was considered their first significant reversal for the war. In November 1942, the campaign ended after the Japanese withdrawal, with Australian advances leading to the Battle of Buna–Gona.

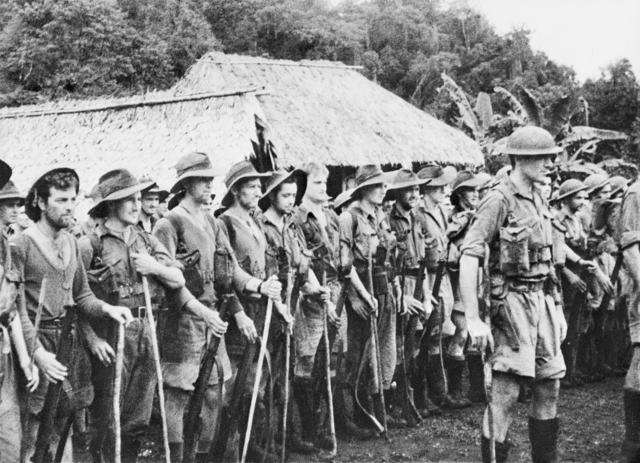
Soldiers of the Australian 39th Battalion in September 1942

In early 1943, the Salamaua–Lae campaign began, with operations against the entrenched Japanese aimed towards recapturing the eponymous towns. This culminated in the capture of Lae, held by the 7th Division in early September 1943, from a successful combined amphibious landing at Lae and an airborne landing at Nadzab. The seaborne assault was notable as it was the first large–scale amphibious operation since Gallipoli. Subsequently, Salamaua was taken days later on 11 September 1943, by a separate joint Australia–US attack. The Battle of Lae was additionally part of the wider Huon Peninsula campaign. Following Lae's capture, the Battle of Finschhafen commenced with a relatively swift control of objectives, with subsequent Japanese counterattacks beaten off. On 17 November 1943, a major offensive that began with the Battle of Sattelberg, continued with the Battle of Wareo, and concluded with the Battle of Sio on 15 January 1944, was unleashed. The momentum of this advance was continued by the 8th Brigade, as they pursued the enemy in retreat, which culminated with the Battle of Madang.

In mid-1944, Australian forces took over the garrisoning of Torokina from the US with this changeover giving Australian command responsibility over the Bougainville campaign. Soon after arriving in November of the same year, the commander of II Corps, Lieutenant-General Stanley Savige, began an offensive to retake the island with the 3rd Division alongside the 11th and 23rd Brigades. The campaign lasted until the Japanese surrender, with controversy surrounding its little apparent significance to the war's conclusion, and the number of casualties incurred; this was one of Australia's most costliest campaigns in the Second World War.

In October 1944, Australian participation in the Aitape–Wewak campaign began with the replacement of US forces at Aitape with the Australian 6th Division. US forces had previously captured the position, and had held it passively, though Australian command found this unsuitable. On 2 November 1944, the 2/6th Cavalry Commando Regiment was tasked with patrolling the area, wherein minor engagements were reported. In early December, the commandos were sent inland to establish access to the Torricelli Range, while the 19th Brigade handled patrolling, consequently, the amount of fierce fighting and territory secured increased. Following this success, thought was given for the capture of Maprik and Wewak, though supply became a major issue in this period. On 10 February 1945, the campaign's major offensive was underway, which resulted in both falling in quick succession on 22 April 1945. Smaller operations to secure the area continued, and all significant actions ceased by July.

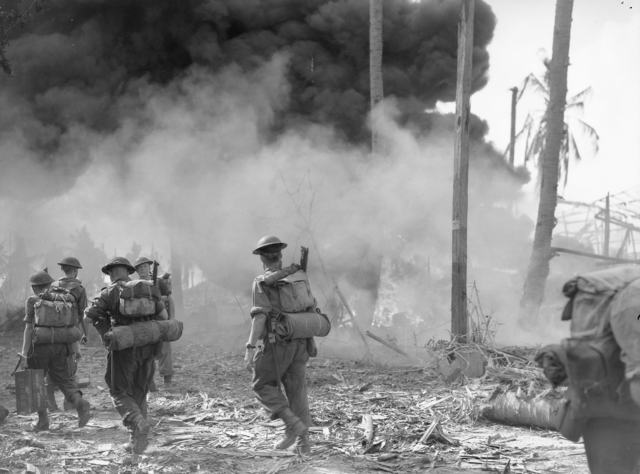
Members of the 7th Division at Balikpapan

The Borneo campaign was a series of three distinct amphibious operations that were undertaken by the 7th and 9th Divisions. The campaign began with the Battle of Tarakan on 1 May 1945, followed six weeks later by the Battle of Labuan, and concluded with the Battle of Balikpapan. The purpose of capturing Tarakan was to establish airfields, and the island was taken seven weeks following the initial amphibious landing. On 10 June 1945, the operation at Labuan commenced, and was tasked to secure resources and a naval base, and would continue until Japan's surrender. On 1 July 1945, the Balikpapan engagement commenced, with all its major objectives being acquired by war's end; this operation remains the largest amphibious operation undertaken by Australian forces, with 33,000 Australian servicemen participating. On 15 August 1945, Japan surrendered, ending the Second World War.

=== Cold War ===
==== Korean War ====
After the surrender of Japan, Australia provided a contingent to the British Commonwealth Occupation Force (BCOF) which included the 34th Brigade. The units that composed the brigade would eventually become the nucleus of the regular army, with the battalions and brigade being renumbered to reflect this change. Following the start of the Korean War, the Australian Army committed troops to fight against the North Korean forces; the units came from the Australian contribution to BCOF. The 3rd Battalion, Royal Australian Regiment (3RAR) arrived in Pusan on 28 September 1950. Australian troop numbers would increase and continue to be deployed up until the armistice, with 3RAR being eventually joined by the 1st Battalion, Royal Australian Regiment (1RAR). For a brief period, between 1951 and 1959, the Menzies Government reinstituted conscription and compulsory military training with the National Service Scheme, which required all males of eighteen years of age to serve for specified period in either the Australian Regular Army (ARA) or CMF.

==== Malayan Emergency ====
The Australian military entered the Malayan Emergency (1948–1960) in October 1955, committing the 2nd Battalion, Royal Australian Regiment (2RAR) to fight alongside Commonwealth forces. The 2RAR fought against the Malayan National Liberation Army (MNLA), a communist led guerrilla army whose goal was to turn Malaya into a socialist republic, and whose leaders had previously been trained and funded by Britain to resist the Japanese occupation of Malaya. Australian military operations in Malaya consisted of patrolling actions and guarding infrastructure, though they rarely saw combat as the emergency was nearly over by the time of their deployment. All three original Royal Australian Regiment battalions would complete at least one tour before the end of operations. In August 1963, Australia ended deployments to Malaya, three years after the emergency's official end.

==== Indonesia–Malaysia confrontation ====
In 1962, the Borneo Confrontation began, due to Indonesia's opposition to the formation of Malaysia. It was an undeclared war that entailed a series of border conflicts between Indonesian-backed forces and British–Malaysian allies. Initial Australian support in the conflict began, and continued throughout, with the training and supply of Malaysian troops; Australian soldiers only saw combat during defensive operations. In January 1965, permission was granted for the deployment of 3RAR, with extensive operations conducted in Sarawak from March until their withdrawal in July 1965. The subsequent deployment of 4th Battalion, Royal Australian Regiment (4RAR), in April 1966, was less intensive, with the battalion withdrawn in August. This is not to mention the efforts of several other corps and units in the conflict.

==== Vietnam War ====
The Australian Army commenced its involvement in the Vietnam War by sending military advisors in 1962, which was then increased by sending in combat troops, specifically 1RAR, on 27 May 1965. Just before the official start of hostilities, the Australian Army was augmented with the reintroduction of conscription, which was based on a 'birthday ballot' selection process for all registered 20-year-old males. These men were required to register, unless they gave a legitimate reason for their exemption, else they faced penalties. This scheme would prove to be one of the most controversial implementations of conscription in Australia, with large protests against its adoption.

In March 1966, the Australian Army increased its commitment again with the replacement of 1RAR with the 1st Australian Task Force, a force in which all nine battalions of the Royal Australian Regiment would serve. One of the heaviest actions of the war occurred in August 1966, with the Battle of Long Tan, wherein D Company, 6th Battalion, Royal Australian Regiment (6RAR) successfully fended off an enemy force, estimated at 2,000 men, for four hours. In 1968, Australian forces defended against the Tet Offensive, a Viet Cong military operation, and repulsed them with few casualties. The contribution of personnel to the war was gradually wound down, starting in late-1970 and ending in 1972; the official declaration of the end of Australia's involvement in the war was made on 11 January 1973.

==== Activities in Africa ====
Following the Vietnam War, there was a significant hiatus of operational activity by the Australian Army. In late 1979, in the largest deployment of the decade, the Army committed 151 troops to the Commonwealth Monitoring Force, which monitored the transition of Rhodesia to universal suffrage. A decade later in 1989, Australia deployed 300 army engineer personnel as the Australian contribution to the United Nations Transition Assistance Group in Namibia. The mission helped transition the country to independence from South African control.

=== Recent history (1990–present) ===
==== Peacekeeping ====
Following the invasion of Kuwait by Iraq in August 1990, a coalition of countries sponsored by the United Nations Security Council, of which Australia was a part, gave a deadline for Iraq to withdraw from Kuwait of 15 January 1991. Iraq refused to retreat and thus full conflict and the Gulf War began two days later on 17 January 1991. In January 1993, the Australian Army deployed 26 personnel on an ongoing rotational basis to the Multinational Force and Observers (MFO), as part of a non-United Nations peacekeeping organisation that observes and enforces the peace treaty between Israel and Egypt.

Australia's largest peacekeeping deployment began in 1999 with the International Force for East Timor, while other ongoing operations include peacekeeping in the Sinai (as part of MFO), and the United Nations Truce Supervision Organization (as part of Operation Paladin since 1956). Humanitarian relief after the 2004 Indian Ocean earthquake in Aceh Province, Indonesia, Operation Sumatra Assist, ended on 24 March 2005.

==== Afghanistan and Iraq ====
Following the 11 September 2001 terrorist attacks, Australia promised troops to any military operations that the US commenced in response to the attacks. Subsequently, the Australian Army committed combat troops to Afghanistan in Operation Slipper. This combat role continued until the end of 2013 when it was replaced by a training contingent operating under Operation Highroad until 2021.

After the Gulf War the UN imposed heavy restrictions on Iraq to stop them producing any Weapon of mass destruction. In the early 21st century, the US accused Iraq of possessing these weapons, and requested that the UN invade the country in response, a motion which Australia supported. The UN denied this motion, however, it did not stop a coalition, that Australia joined, invading the country; thus starting the Iraq War on 19 March 2003.

Between April 2015 and June 2020, the Army deployed a 300-strong element to Iraq, designated as Task Group Taji, as part of Operation Okra. In support of a capacity building mission, Task Group Taji's main role was to provide training to Iraqi forces, during which Australian troops have served alongside counterparts from New Zealand.

In 2020 an investigation of allegations of war crimes committed during Australian military operations in Afghanistan was concluded with the release of the Brereton Report. The report identified 25 ADF personnel that were involved directly or indirectly in the murder of 39 civilians and prisoners, with 19 referred to the Australian Federal Police to be criminally investigated. A 'warrior culture' in the SAS was specifically criticised with investigators 'frustrated by outright deceit by those who knew the truth and, not infrequently, misguided resistance to inquiries and investigations by their superiors'.

== Organisation ==
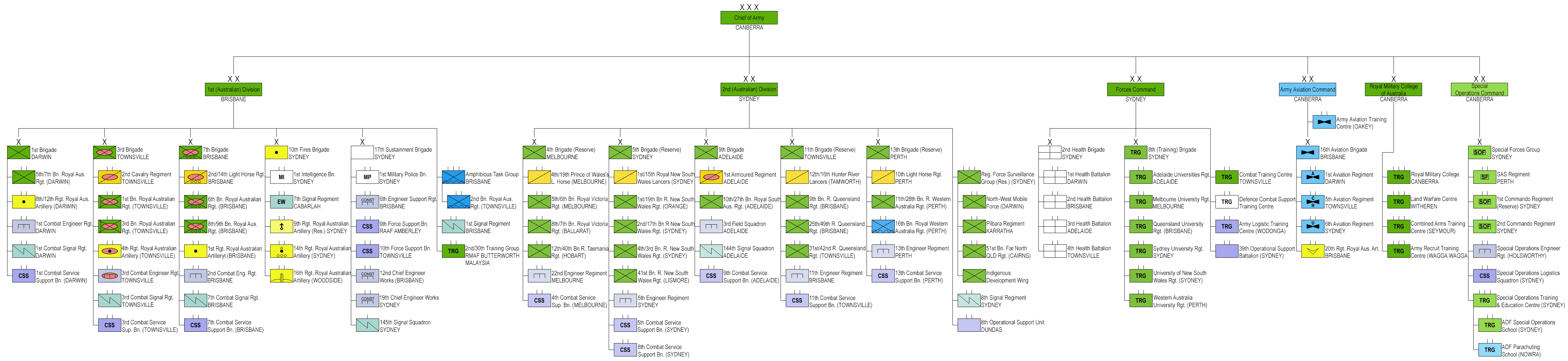
Australian Army organisation 2025

=== 1st (Australian) Division ===
Beginning 1 July 2023, the division was renamed the 1st Australian Division. The 1st, 3rd and 7th Brigades were placed under the direct control of the division's headquarters. This reform aimed to improve the connections between the divisional headquarters and the brigades it commands during deployments.

- 1 Brigade – Light Combat Brigade based in Darwin.
- 3 Brigade – Armoured Combat Brigade based in Townsville.
- 7 Brigade – Motorised Combat Brigade based in Brisbane.
- 10 Brigade – Fires Brigade based in Adelaide.
- 17 Sustainment Brigade – Logistic brigade based in Sydney.

=== Forces Command ===
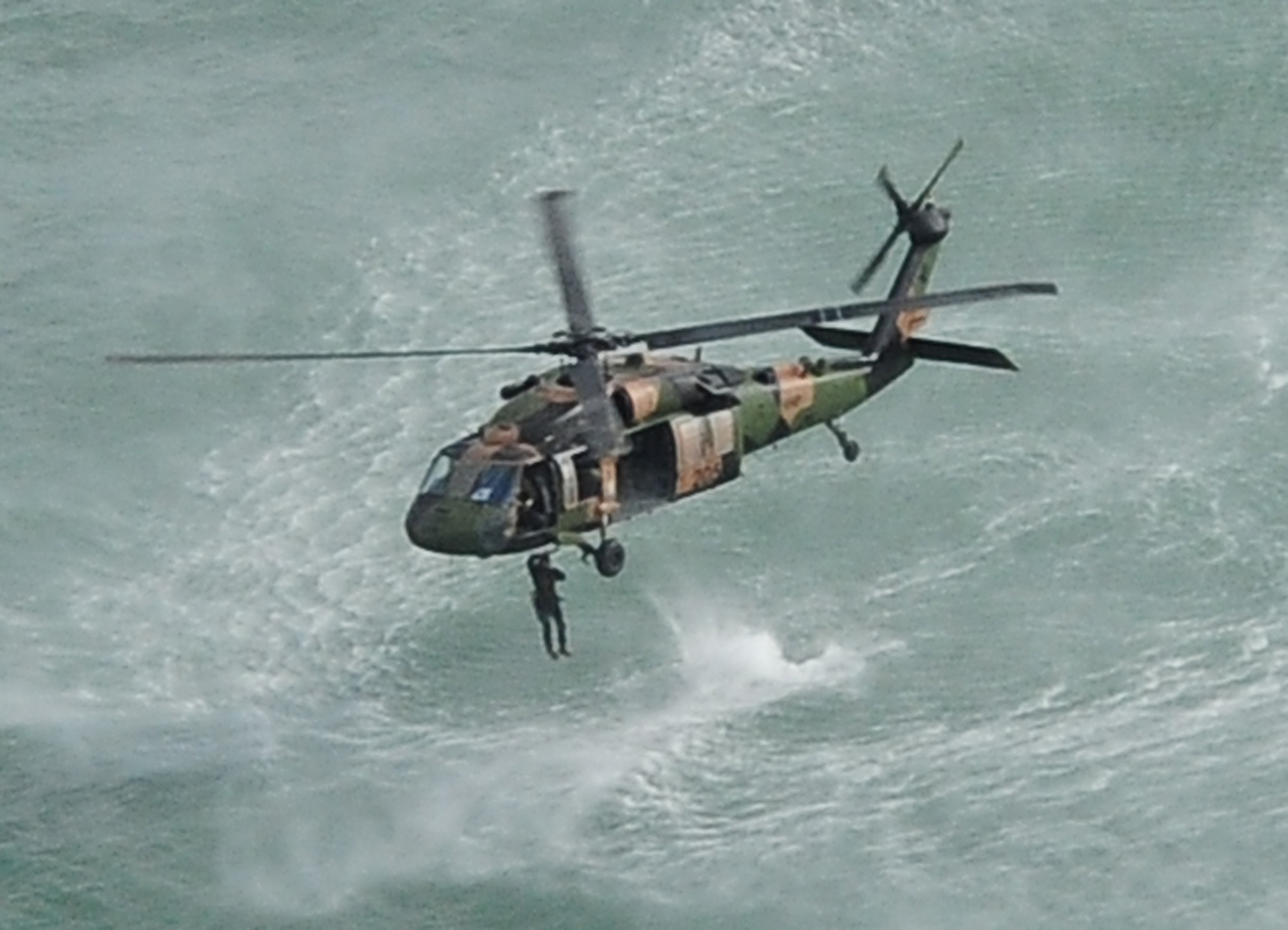
A 1st Commando Regiment soldier jumping from a 16th Aviation Brigade, 171st Special Operations Aviation Squadron Black Hawk helicopter

Forces Command controls for administrative purposes all non-combat assets of the Australian Army. Its focus is on unifying all training establishments to create a base for scaling and mobilisation:

- 2 Brigade – Health Brigade based across Australia.
- 8 Brigade – training brigade with units around Australia.

Additionally, Forces Command includes the following training and support establishments:

- Army Recruit Training Centre at Kapooka, NSW;
- Royal Military College, Duntroon in the ACT;
- Combined Arms Training Centre at Puckapunyal, Victoria;
- Army Logistic Training Centre at Bonegilla and Bandiana, Victoria;
- Defence Command Support Training Centre at Macleod, Victoria;
- Combat Training Centre at Townsville, Queensland.
- 39th Operational Support Battalion at Sydney, NSW.

=== 2nd (Australian) Division ===
Administers the reserve forces from its headquarters located in Sydney.

- 4 Brigade – based in Victoria and Tasmania.
- 5 Brigade – based in New South Wales.
- 9 Brigade – based in South Australia.
- 11 Brigade – based in Queensland.
- 13 Brigade – based in Western Australia.

=== Aviation ===
Army Aviation Command is responsible for the Australian Army's helicopters and training, aviation safety and unmanned aerial vehicles (UAV). Army Aviation Command comprises:

- 16 Aviation Brigade – brigade based in Gallipoli Barracks at Enoggera, Brisbane.
- Army Aviation Training Centre at Oakey, Queensland

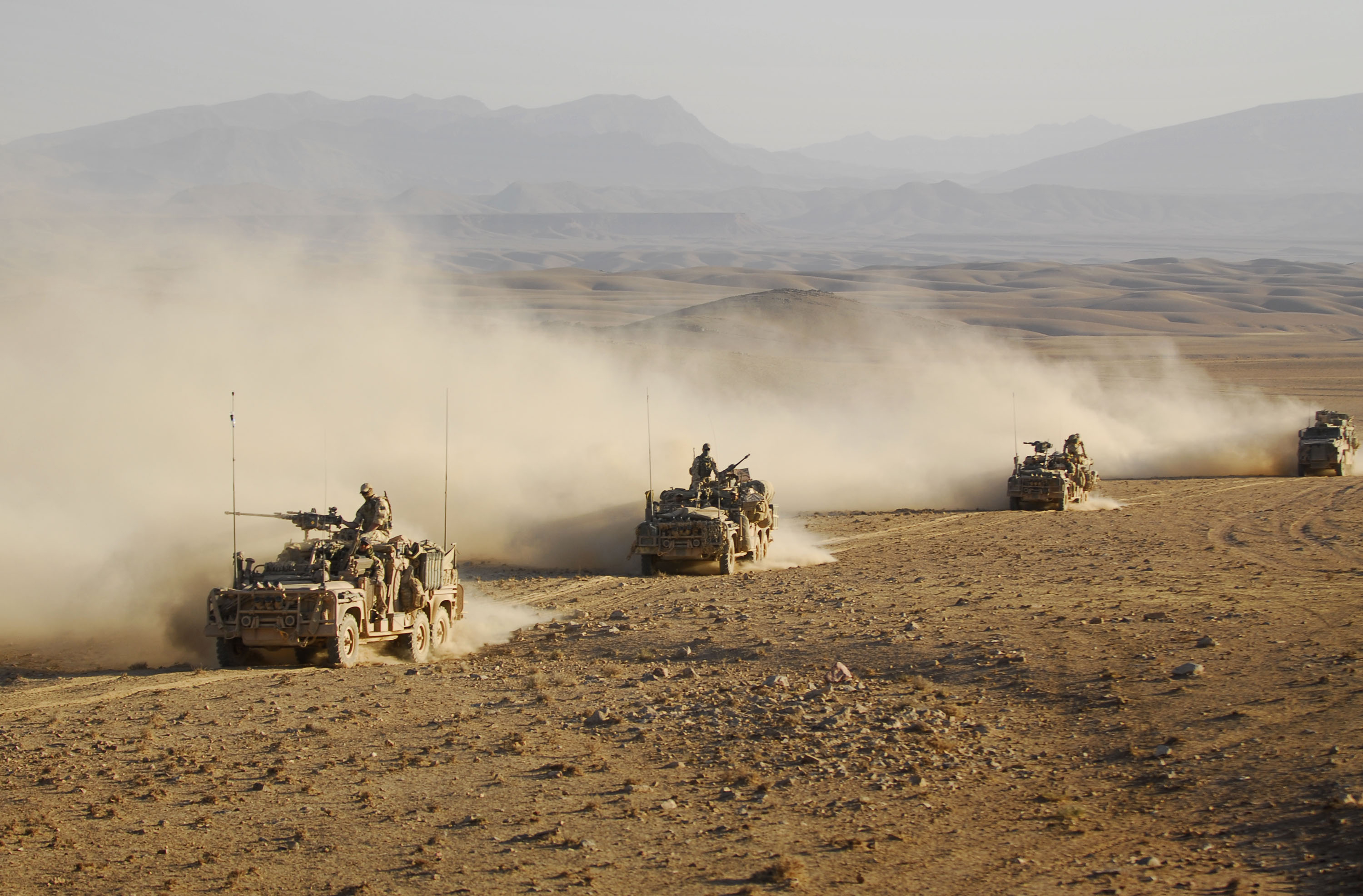
Australian special forces in Afghanistan, 2009

=== Special Forces ===
Special Operations Command is a command formation of equal status to the other commands in the ADF and includes all of Army's special forces units. Special Operations Command comprises:

- Special Forces Group – a brigade-level headquarters.

== Colours, standards and guidons ==
All colours of the Army were on parade for the centenary of the Army, 10 March 2001.

Infantry, and some other combat units of the Australian Army carry flags called the King's Colour and the Regimental Colour, known as "the Colours". Armoured units carry Standards and Guidons – flags smaller than Colours and traditionally carried by Cavalry, Lancer, Light Horse and Mounted Infantry units. The 1st Armoured Regiment is the only unit in the Australian Army to carry a Standard, in the tradition of heavy armoured units. Artillery units' guns are considered to be their Colours, and on parade are provided with the same respect. Non-combat units (combat service support corps) do not have Colours, as Colours are battle flags and so are only available to combat units. As a substitute, many have Standards or Banners. Units awarded battle honours have them emblazoned on their Colours, Standards and Guidons. They are a link to the unit's past and a memorial to the fallen. Artillery do not have Battle Honours – their single Honour is "Ubique" which means "Everywhere" – although they can receive Honour Titles.

The Army is the guardian of the National Flag and as such, unlike the Royal Australian Air Force, does not have a flag or Colours. The Army, instead, has a banner, known as the Army Banner. To commemorate the centenary of the Army, the Governor-General Sir William Deane, presented the Army with a new Banner at a parade in front of the Australian War Memorial on 10 March 2001. The banner was presented to the Regimental Sergeant Major of the Army (RSM-A), Warrant Officer Peter Rosemond.

The Army Banner bears the Australian Coat of Arms on the obverse, with the dates "1901–2001" in gold in the upper hoist. The reverse bears the Rising Sun badge of the Australian Army, flanked by seven campaign honours on small gold-edged scrolls: South Africa, World War I, World War II, Korea, Malaya-Borneo, South Vietnam, and Peacekeeping. The banner is trimmed with gold fringe, has gold and crimson cords and tassels, and is mounted on a pike with the usual British royal crest finial.

== Personnel ==
=== Strength ===
As of June 2022 the Army had 28,387 permanent (regular) members and 20,742 reservists (part-time); all of whom are volunteers. As of June 2022, women made up 15.11% of the Army, with a target set for 18% 2025. Gender based restrictions for frontline combat or training roles were lifted in January 2013. Also as of June 2022, Indigenous Australians made up 3.7% of the Army.

=== Rank and insignia ===
The ranks of the Australian Army are based on the ranks of the British Army, and carry mostly the same actual insignia. For officers the ranks are identical except for the shoulder title "Australia". The Non-Commissioned Officer insignia are the same up until Warrant Officer, where they are stylised for Australia (for example, using the Australian, rather than the British coat of arms). The ranks of the Australian Army are as follows:

Rank insignia of the commissioned officers of the Australian Army
Rank group	Field marshals	General officers			Field officers				Junior officers			Officer cadets
ADF code	O-11	O-10	O-9	O-8	O-7	O-6	O-5	O-4	O-3	O-2	O-1	N/A
Insignia												
Rank	Field marshal	General	Lieutenant-general	Major-general	Brigadier	Colonel	Lieutenant colonel	Major	Captain	Lieutenant	Second lieutenant	Officer cadet (Note: Officer cadets at the Royal Military College, Duntroon, use the honorary title of 'staff cadet')
Abbreviation	FM	GEN	LTGEN	MAJGEN	BRIG	COL	LTCOL	MAJ	CAPT	LT	2LT	OCDT

Rank insignia of the other ranks of the Australian Army
Rank group	Warrant officers			Senior NCOs	Junior NCOs		Soldiers	
ADF code	E-10	E-09	E-08	E-06	E-05	E-04	E-03	E-02
Insignia							No insignia	
Typical appointment	Regimental Sergeant Major of the Army	Regimental sergeant major	Squadron/battery/company sergeant major					
Rank	Warrant officer	Warrant officer class 1	Warrant officer class 2	Sergeant	Corporal	Lance corporal	Private proficient (Note: Private proficient is not an ADF rank, it is a proficiency point for which a higher rate of salary is provided. Private proficient simply means a private who has completed basic training, initial employment training and is proficient in his/her trade – generally spending twelve months "on the job" first. A PTE(P) soldier does not 'outrank' a PTE soldier for discipline purposes. However, a PTE(P) soldier (also known as a senior soldier/senior digger) may be made responsible for tasking and training of junior soldier(s) within their section. A PTE(P) soldier is equivalent to an able seaman in the Royal Australian Navy and a leading aircraftsman/leading aircraftswoman in the Royal Australian Air Force.)	Private (or equivalent)
Abbreviation	WO	WO1	WO2	SGT	CPL	LCPL	PTE(P)	PTE

=== Uniforms and Dress ===
The Australian Army uniforms are detailed in the Australian Army Dress Manual and are grouped into nine general categories, each ranging from ceremonial dress, to general duties dress, to battle dress (in addition there are a number of special categories specific to uniforms that are only worn when posted to specific locations, like ADFA or RMC-D), these are further divided into individual 'Dress Orders' denoted by alphabetical suffixes that detail the specific items of clothing, embellishment and accoutrements, i.e. Dress Order No. 1A – 'Ceremonial Parade Service Dress', Dress Order No. 2G – 'General Duty Office Dress', Dress Order No 4C 'Combat Dress (AMCU)' . The slouch hat or beret are the regular service and general duties hat, while the field hat, or combat helmet is for use in the field while training, on exercise, or on operations. In December 2013 the Chief of Army reversed a previous ban on berets as general duties headwear for all personnel except Special Forces personnel (Special Air Service Regiment, Commando Regiments). Australian Multi-cam Camouflage Uniform is the camouflage pattern for Australian Army camouflage uniforms, and was introduced in 2014, replacing the Disruptive Pattern Camouflage Uniform (DPCU), and Disruptive Pattern Desert Uniform (DPDU) for all Australian Army orders of dress.

== Equipment ==
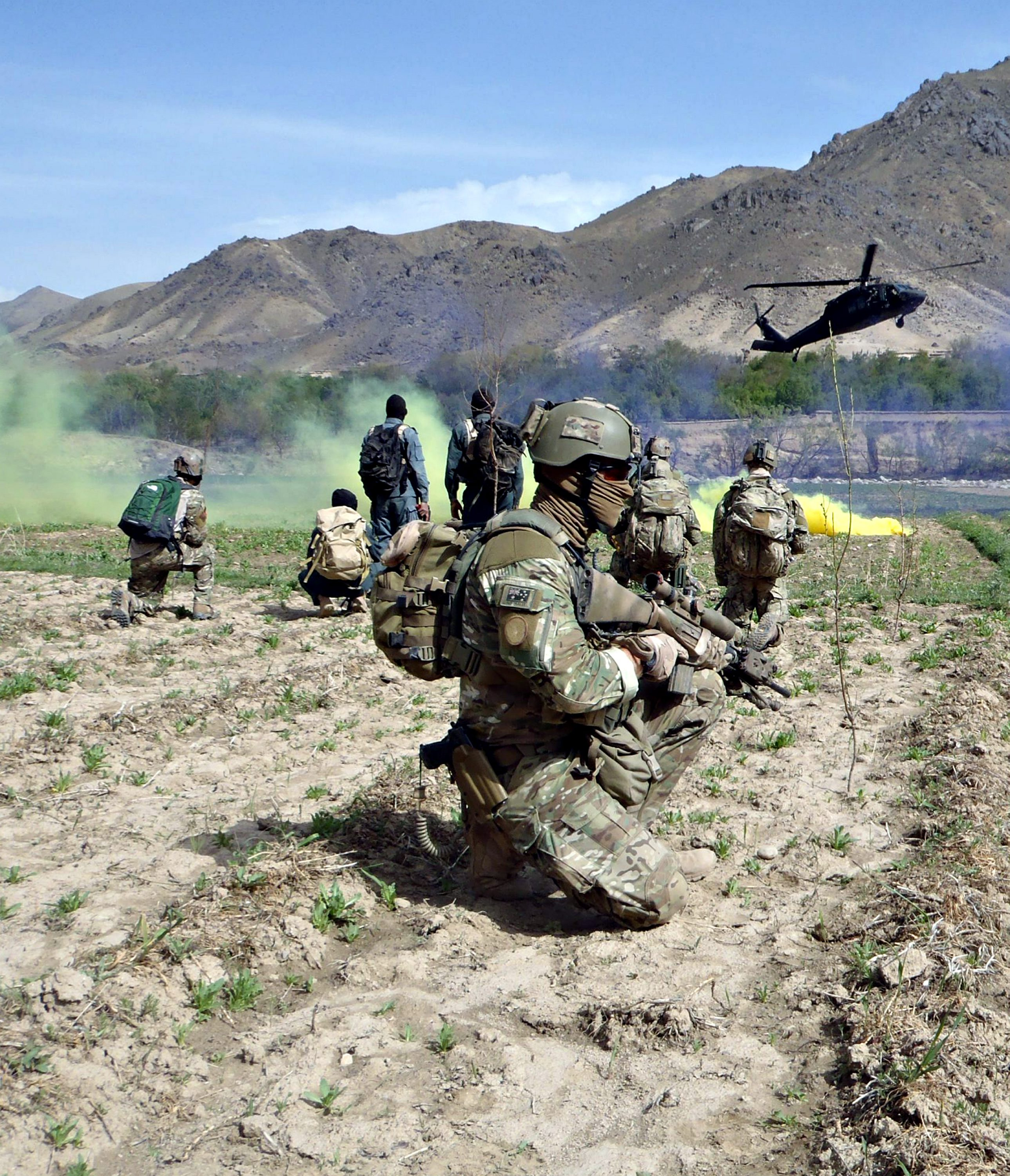
SR-25 rifle, Heckler & Koch USP sidearm

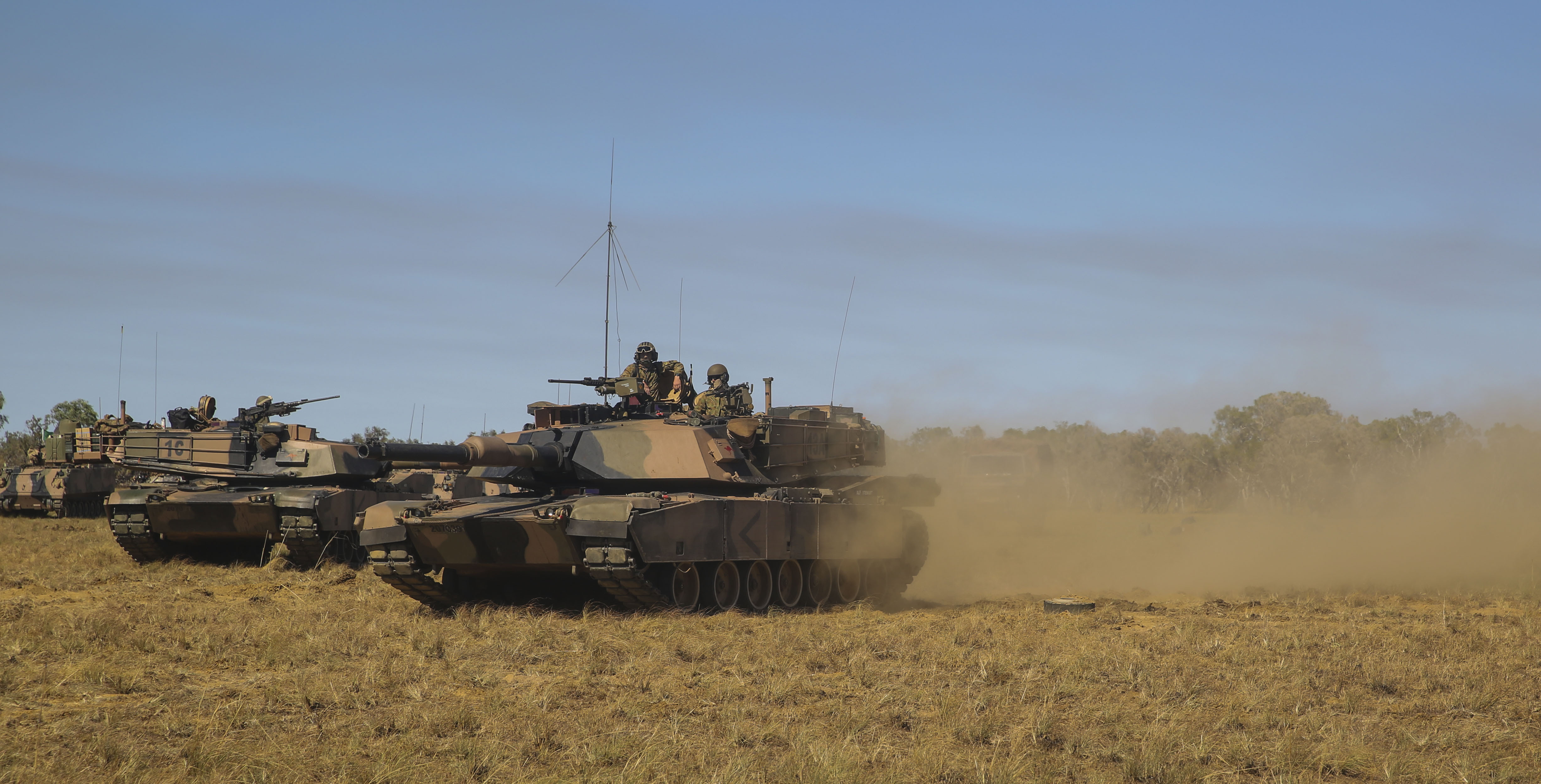
Australian M1 Abrams, the main battle tank used by the Army

=== Firearms and artillery ===
Small arms	Enhanced F88 Austeyr (EF88) (service rifle), F89 Minimi (support weapon), F9 SWS (sidearm) is replacing the Browning Hi-Power, MAG-58 (general purpose machine gun), HK417, SR-98 (sniper rifle), Maximi and AW50F.
Special forces	M4 carbine, Heckler & Koch USP, SR-25, F89 Minimi, MP5, SR-98, Maximi, HK416, HK417, Blaser R93 Tactical, Barrett M82 and Mk14 EBR.
Artillery	48 M777A2 155 mm Howitzer, 176 M252A1 81mm Mortar, and M224A1 60mm Mortar.

=== Vehicles ===
Main battle tanks	75 M1A2 SEPv3 Abrams have been delivered to replace the M1A1 Abrams.
Armoured recovery vehicles	13 M88A2 Hercules Armoured Recovery Vehicles.
Reconnaissance vehicles	257 ASLAVs, to be replaced beginning in 2019 with 211 Boxers.
Armoured Personnel Carriers	431 M113s upgraded to M113AS3/4 standard, to be replaced with the Hanwha Redback.
Infantry Mobility Vehicles	763 Bushmaster (Protected Mobility Vehicle – Medium) as of November 2023 were in service, 31 HMT Extenda Mk1 Nary vehicles and 89 HMT Extenda Mk2.
Light Utility Vehicles	G-Wagon 4x4 and 6x6, Hawkei (Protected Mobility Vehicle – Light).
Trucks	Rheinmetall MAN HX series.
Wheeled artillery	8 M142 HIMARS from an order of 42 as of 2025 are in service. A further 20 are planned to be delivered in 2026.
Tracked artillery	30 AS9 Huntsman are expected to begin entering service in early 2026.

=== Support ===
Radar	AN/TPQ-36 Firefinder radar, AMSTAR Ground Surveillance RADAR, AN/TPQ-48 Lightweight Counter Mortar Radar, GIRAFFE FOC, Portable Search and Target Acquisition Radar – Extended Range, CEA Tactical (Hawkei), CEA Operational (HX77).
Unmanned Aerial Vehicles	RQ-7B Shadow 200, Wasp AE, and PD-100 Black Hornet.

=== Aircraft ===
Transport helicopters	14 Boeing CH-47F Chinook heavy transport helicopters. 17 Sikorsky UH-60M Black Hawk helicopters for medium lift/utility are in service as of 2025 with a total of 40 to be delivered by 2030.
Attack helicopters	8 Boeing AH-64E Apache Guardians have been delivered as of November 2026 from an order of 29 with all aircraft expected to be delivered by 2029 as part of the 2026 National Defence Strategy.
Training helicopters	15 Eurocopter EC-135T2+ training helicopters, jointly shared with Navy.

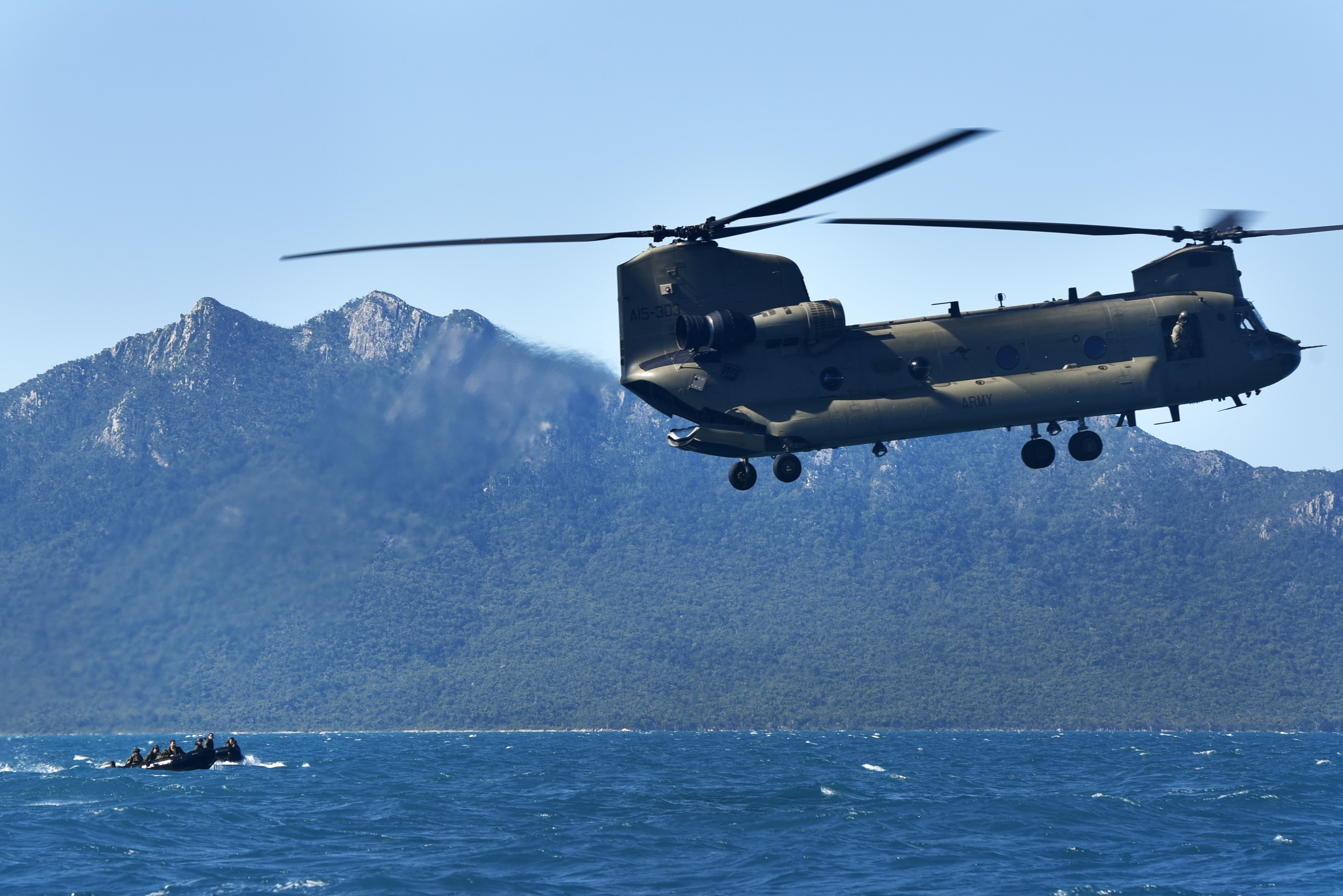
Australian Army CH-47F Chinook

== Bases ==
The Army's operational headquarters, Forces Command, is located at Victoria Barracks in Sydney. The Australian Army's three regular brigades are based at Robertson Barracks near Darwin, Lavarack Barracks in Townsville, and Gallipoli Barracks in Brisbane. The Deployable Joint Force Headquarters is also located at Gallipoli Barracks.

Other important Army bases include the Army Aviation Centre near Oakey, Queensland, Holsworthy Barracks near Sydney, Lone Pine Barracks in Singleton, New South Wales and Woodside Barracks near Adelaide, South Australia. The SASR is based at Campbell Barracks Swanbourne, a suburb of Perth, Western Australia.

Puckapunyal, north of Melbourne, houses the Australian Army's Combined Arms Training Centre, Land Warfare Development Centre, and three of the five principal Combat Arms schools. Further barracks include Steele Barracks in Sydney, Keswick Barracks in Adelaide, and Irwin Barracks at Karrakatta in Perth. Dozens of Australian Army Reserve depots are located across Australia.

== Australian Army Journal ==
Since June 1948, the Australian Army has published its own journal titled the Australian Army Journal. The journal's first editor was Colonel Eustace Keogh, and initially, it was intended to assume the role that the Army Training Memoranda had filled during the Second World War, although its focus, purpose, and format has shifted over time. Covering a broad range of topics including essays, book reviews and editorials, with submissions from serving members as well as professional authors, the journal's stated goal is to provide "...the primary forum for Army's professional discourse... [and]... debate within the Australian Army... [and improve the]... intellectual rigor of that debate by adhering to a strict and demanding standard of quality". In 1976, the journal was placed on hiatus as the Defence Force Journal began publication; however, publishing of the Australian Army Journal began again in 1999 and since then the journal has been published largely on a quarterly basis, with only minimal interruptions.

== See also ==
- Australian Defence Force ranks and insignia
- Australian military slang
- Battle and theatre honours of the Australian Army
- Conscription in Australia
- List of Australian Army units
- List of Australian military memorials
- Army (newspaper)

== Bibliography ==
- Australian National Audit Office (2009). Army Reserve Forces (PDF). Audit Report No. 31 2008–09. Canberra: Australian National Audit Office. ISBN 978-0-642-81063-2. Archived from the original (PDF) on 15 May 2009.
- Blaxland, John (2014). The Australian Army from Whitllam to Howard. Port Melbourne: Cambridge University Press. ISBN 9781107043657.
- Brune, Peter (2019). Our Great-Hearted Men: The Australian Corps and the 100 Days. Australia: HarperCollinsPublishers. ISBN 9781460756515.
- Cameron, David W. (2018). Australian on the Western Front: 1918. Vol. two:Spearheading the Great British Offensive. Penguin Random House Australia. pp. 377–466. ISBN 9780670078288.
- Dennis, Peter; Grey, Jeffrey; Morris, Ewan; Prior, Robin (1995). The Oxford Companion to Australian Military History. Melbourne: Oxford University Press. ISBN 0-19-553227-9.
- Grey, Jeffrey (2008). A Military History of Australia (3rd ed.). Melbourne, Victoria: Cambridge University Press. ISBN 978-0-521-69791-0.
- Horner, David (2001). Making the Australian Defence Force. Melbourne, Victoria: Oxford University Press. ISBN 0-19-554117-0.
- Jobson, Christopher (2009). Looking Forward, Looking Back: Customs and Traditions of the Australian Army. Wavell Heights, Queensland: Big Sky Publishing. ISBN 978-0-9803251-6-4.
- Johnston, Mark (1 September 2005). Huon Peninsula 1943–1944. Australians in the Pacific War. Canberra: Department of Veterans' Affairs. ISBN 1-920720-55-3. Archived from the original on 24 April 2021.
- Johnston, Mark (June 2008). Aitape-Wewak 1944–1945. Australians in the Pacific War (Second ed.). Canberra: Department of Veteran's Affairs. ISBN 978-1-920720-54-4. Archived from the original on 25 April 2021.
- Lee, Sandra (2007). 18 Hours: The True Story of an SAS War Hero. Pymble, New South Wales: HarperCollins. ISBN 978-0-73228-246-2.
- Long, Gavin (1961). Volume I – To Benghazi. Australia in the War of 1939–1945, Series 1 – Army (1961 reprint ed.). Australian War Memorial. OCLC 480402381. Archived from the original on 9 July 2015.
- Moore, Jonathan J. (2018). A History of the Australian Military: From the First Fleet to the Modern Day. New Holland Publishers. ISBN 9781760790479.
- Odgers, George (1988). Army Australia: An Illustrated History. Frenchs Forest, New South Wales: Child & Associates. ISBN 0-86777-061-9.
- Palazzo, Albert (2001). The Australian Army: A History of its Organisation 1901–2001. Melbourne, Victoria: Oxford University Press. ISBN 978-0-19-551506-0.
- Payton, Philip (2018). Repat: A Concise History of Repatriation in Australia (PDF). Department of Veterans' Affairs. ISBN 978-0-9876151-8-3. Archived (PDF) from the original on 9 October 2022.
- Stockings, Craig (2007). The Torch and the Sword: A History of the Army Cadet Movement in Australia. UNSW Press. p. 86. ISBN 9780868408385.
- Walker, Allan S. (1953). Long, Gavin (ed.). Volume II – Middle East and Far East. Australia in the War of 1939–1945, Series 5 – Medical (1962 reprint ed.). Canberra: Australian War Memorial. ISBN 978-0-642-99366-3. OCLC 462978520. Archived from the original on 26 April 2021.
