= Tunnel rat (disambiguation) =

Tunnel rats were soldiers who performed underground search and destroy missions during the Vietnam War.

Tunnel rat or similar can mean:

- 1968 Tunnel Rats, a 2008 film
- Tunnel Rats (video game), a videogame based on the movie
- Tunnel Rat (G.I. Joe), a fictional character in the G.I. Joe universe
- Tunnel Rats (music group), an underground hip hop collective
  - Tunnel Rats (album), the third album by Tunnel Rats
