= Sandy MacGregor =

Australian author and former army officer (born 1940)

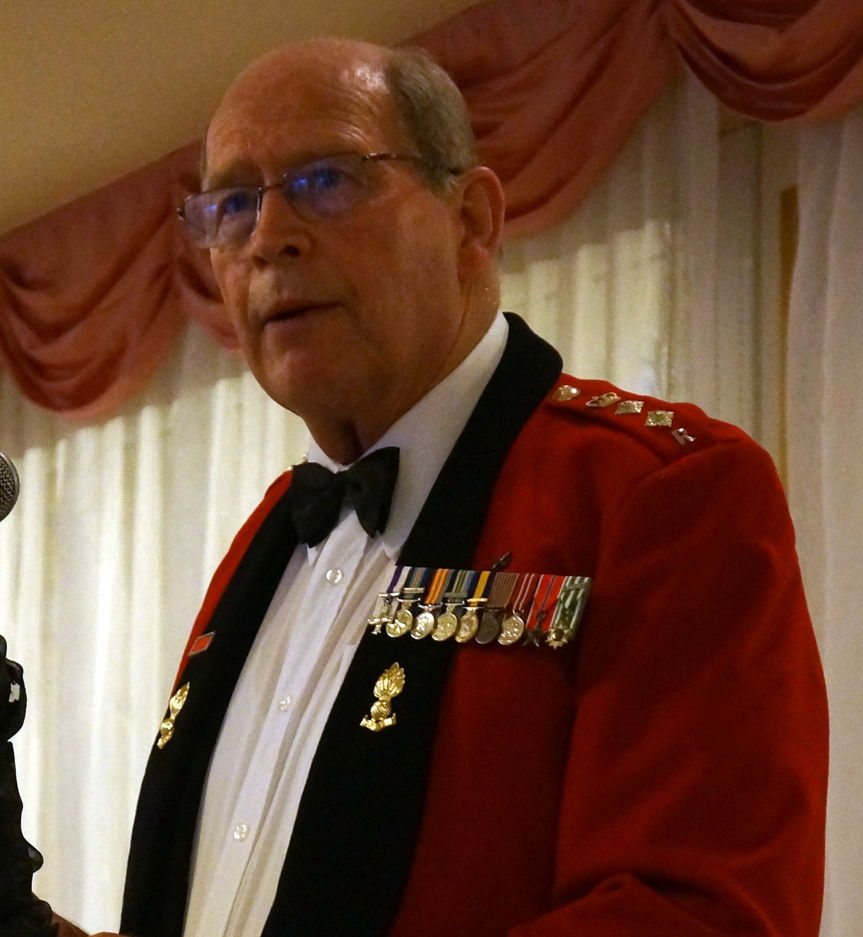
- MacGregor in 2014
- Born: 16 March 1940 (age 86); New Delhi, British India
- Military career
- Allegiance: Australia
- Branch: Australian Regular Army (1957–68); Australian Army Reserve (1968–87)
- Service years: 1957–87
- Rank: Colonel
- Commands: Officer Cadet Training Unit; University of New South Wales Regiment
- Conflicts: Vietnam War
- Awards: Military Cross; Reserve Force Decoration; Bronze Star Medal (United States)
- Website: www.calm.com.au

Colonel Alexander Hugh "Sandy" MacGregor, MC, RFD (born 16 March 1940) is an Australian author and former army officer. From 1989 until 2015, MacGregor ran workshops and seminars, teaching people in the public, educational and private sectors on how to "use the power of the subconscious mind."

== Early life ==
MacGregor was born in New Delhi on 16 March 1940, where his father was serving in the Royal Australian Engineers. His grandfather and great-grandfather had also served in the Corps of Engineers. His family relocated to Ulverstone, Tasmania, when he was eight years old.

== Military service ==
MacGregor graduated from the Royal Military College, Duntroon in 1960 and then completed a degree in civil engineering at the University of Sydney.

MacGregor served in the Vietnam War as a captain, commanding the 3 Field Troop engineers from September 1965 to September 1966. MacGregor was the first anti-communist soldier to explore the Củ Chi tunnels. Whereas standard US Army practice had been to seal, blow up or otherwise attempt to render tunnel systems unusable with smoke, tear gas and explosives before quickly moving on, MacGregor and his men searched and mapped the tunnels they found, using telephone line and compasses to plot the subterranean passages. MacGregor was the first to head down the tunnels. With a torch in one hand and his army pistol in the other, he was lowered into a tunnel by his sergeant, who had tied a rope around one of his legs. Over a period of four days MacGregor and his men found ammunition, radio equipment, medical supplies, typewriters, over 100,000 pieces of paper and food as well as signs of considerable Viet Cong presence. One of the men under his command, Corporal Robert Bowtell, died from asphyxiation when he became trapped in a tunnel that turned out to be a dead end. At an international press conference in Saigon shortly after Operation Crimp, MacGregor referred to his men as tunnel ferrets. An American journalist, having never heard of ferrets, used the term tunnel rats instead. The term stuck, and has since been used to refer any soldiers who performed underground search and destroy missions during the Vietnam War. MacGregor was later awarded the Military Cross for his leadership and actions. He was also awarded a Bronze Star Medal by the United States Armed Forces.

MacGregor's service included commanding both the Officer Cadet Training Unit and the University of New South Wales Regiment. He finished his career in the military as a colonel in the Australian Army Reserve.

MacGregor returned to Vietnam in 1998 to revisit the tunnels he explored and meet with former enemy soldiers.

== Post-military life ==
After he had retired from the army, MacGregor began working for his father-in-law. He later divorced his first wife Beverley, with whom he had four children, and married Sandra with whom he had another two children. On 23 January 1987, MacGregor's three daughters from his first marriage and a friend were shot dead by Richard Madrell, a paranoid schizophrenic who was reportedly infatuated with one of the daughters. MacGregor states he began "meditating again soon after the murder and I realised in meditation that hatred, anger and revenge will only make me another victim. That's when I started to work within meditation, acceptance, co-operation, unconditional love and forgiveness." MacGregor began running lectures and seminars in 1989 on the power of the subconscious mind - overcoming pain, distress and many other life issues.

In 2001, while being interviewed for Australian Story, MacGregor said that he first publicly admitted to forgiving his daughter's killer during a radio interview with Margaret Throsby.

She actually asked me the question, "And you have forgiven him?" And that was when I, you know, had this rush of adrenalin, and thinking, "Well, hey, it's too late now. People are going to think I'm a bit of a nut." "Yes, I have forgiven him, Margaret."

— Sandy MacGregor being interviewed on Australian Story

454 people rang the radio station regarding MacGregor's interview. MacGregor states he has received letters from people who are angry that he has forgiven the killer, on the grounds that this is dishonouring his daughters. MacGregor maintains that forgiveness is for the forgiver, not for the forgiven, and that by moving forward and not carrying anger he is honouring them.

In 2001 MacGregor met Madrell in prison for the first time and forgave him face to face.

I want to reiterate that I [did] it for me, not for him. It doesn't give him carte blanche to go out and do it again.

— Sandy MacGregor being interviewed on 60 Minutes

MacGregor believes Madrell should remain in gaol for life as his schizophrenia makes him a danger to the public. He continued to run seminars encouraging people to "use their inner strength and power" until 2015. His ex-wife Beverley was reported to be unhappy that MacGregor spoke of their daughters' murders in his books and seminars, as she believes he does not have the right to gain financially from the incident. MacGregor retired in 2015 soon after being invited to travel to Italy to contribute to the 173rd Airborne Brigade Combat Team's (MacGregor's parent unit in Vietnam) program of resilience.

== Bibliography ==
- MacGregor, Sandy; Thompson, Jimmy (1993). No Need for Heroes. Lindfield, NSW, Australia: Calm Pty Ltd. ISBN 0646151673.
- MacGregor, Sandy (1996). Switch on Your Inner Strength. Lindfield, NSW, Australia: Calm Pty Ltd. ISBN 0646275682.
- MacGregor, Sandy (1992). Piece of Mind. Lindfield, NSW, Australia: Calm Pty Ltd. ISBN 0646084550.
- MacGregor, Sandy (1999). Students' Steps to Success. Oakleigh, Vic: Australian Scholarship Group. ISBN 0957787200.
- MacGregor, Sandy (2000). Creating Happiness Intentionally. Lindfield, NSW, Australia: Calm Pty Ltd. ISBN 0957787219.
- MacGregor, Sandy; Thompson, Jimmy (2011). Tunnel Rats. Crows Nest, New South Wales: Allen & Unwin. ISBN 9781742374895.
- MacGregor, Sandy; Thompson, Jimmy (2012). A Sappers' War. Crows Nest, New South Wales: Allen & Unwin. ISBN 9781743310557.
- MacGregor, Sandy; Thompson, Jimmy (2015). Tunnel Rats vs the Taliban. Crows Nest, New South Wales: Allen & Unwin. ASIN B00WQBFH3G.
- MacGregor, Sandy (2019). Classified Memoirs : A Life Too Interesting. Lindfield, NSW, Australia: Calm Pty Ltd. ISBN 978-0957787285.
