= Tunnel Rats: 1968 =

2009 video game

- Developer: Replay Studios
- Publisher: Boll AG
- Platform: Microsoft Windows
- Release: May 15, 2009
- Genre: First-person shooter
- Mode: Single-player

Tunnel Rats: 1968 is a first-person shooter video game developed by Replay Studios as a tie-in for the Uwe Boll film 1968 Tunnel Rats. It was released for Microsoft Windows in 2009. According to an interview with Uwe Boll, the game was meant to be released on the Xbox 360, but it ultimately has never had an official retail release, and the only digital distribution store that offers the game is Steam. The story takes place after the movie's events as the player character attempts to find the original crew from the film.

== Plot ==
Brooks, an American G.I. serving in the Vietnam War, is sent on a mission to clear enemy-controlled tunnels. However, his helicopter is shot down over enemy territory, leaving Brooks stranded in the jungle as the only surviving member of his platoon.

== Gameplay ==
Tunnel Rats: 1968 is a first-person shooter with seven levels. Booby traps, such as tripwire grenades and trap doors, are located throughout the game world; trap doors are disarmed by locating an actionable point used to deactivate them. Tripwires are disarmed in a minigame where the player must stop a sliding bar within a specified zone; stopping within a narrower target also allows the player to collect the grenade that was part of the mechanism. "Trophies", including dog tags from fallen G.I.s, and ears from the corpses of Vietnamese soldiers, can be collected to increase Brooks' health.

== Reception ==
Tunnel Rats: 1968 was released to negative reception; it holds an aggregate score of 30/100 on Metacritic based on 7 reviews, indicating "generally unfavorable reviews".

GameSpot felt that Tunnel Rats had "clumsy and inconsistent" writing and voice acting, and criticized the characterization of Brooks for making him "one of the least sympathetic heroes you'll ever play as", describing him as "a cruel, foul-mouthed jerk who is often deranged but never witty. He is apparently supposed to be on a character arc that sends him to the cusp of madness, but in reality he's insane from the start." These criticisms also cited the frequent use of inner monologues to advance the game's story. The mechanic of collecting ears from dead Vietnamese soldiers was considered to be in bad taste due to Brooks' personality, and his spoken remarks when doing so. The game's environments, particularly tunnels, were considered to be monotonous and dated-looking, while the guns' iron sights were criticized for being inaccurate in comparison to the normal on-screen crosshairs. The game was also criticized for its bugs, short length, and the high level of precision required to collect trophies and disarm traps in the environment. Giving the game a 2.5 out of 10, GameSpot argued that Tunnel Rats "seems to have a strange notion of what constitutes 'fun.' Does anyone enjoy searching for booby traps in repetitive, brown tunnels or listening to a psychotic man-child rant about his father?"

Rock Paper Shotgun opened its review by acknowledging Uwe Boll's reputation for poorly-received film adaptations of video game franchises. Noting that it featured the typical "motifs" of his works (such as poor dialogue and an abundance of caves), Tunnel Rats was described as being "excruciatingly, bewilderingly bad, such that the predominant thought while playing was: How? How is it possible to make a game this egregiously bad, one that so fundamentally doesn't understand even the basics of what a game is meant to be." The game was criticized for its writing and voice acting (which also resulted in the protagonist being characterized as "a petulant and hateful little idiot"), gameplay mechanics requiring frustrating levels of precision (including the process of disarming traps, and respectively collecting dog tags and ears from the bodies of American and Vietnamese soldiers to regain health), disproportionate amounts of fall damage from low heights, an inability to manually restart a level or save, and numerous bugs. Bugs also prevented the reviewer from completing the second level. GamesRadar similarly criticized the game for being a "nauseating mess from start to finish", but jokingly felt it was better than Uwe Boll's films.
