= Tunnel Rats (film) =

2008 film by Uwe Boll

1968 Tunnel Rats
- Theatrical release poster
- Directed by: Uwe Boll
- Written by: Uwe Boll
- Story by: Uwe Boll; Dan Clarke
- Produced by: Uwe Boll; Dan Clarke; Chris Roland
- Starring: Michael Paré; Nate Parker; Rocky Marquette; Brandon Fobbs; Scott Cooper; Wilson Bethel
- Cinematography: Mathias Neumann
- Edited by: Karen Porter
- Music by: Jessica de Rooij
- Production company: Boll KG
- Distributed by: Kinostar; Vivendi Entertainment
- Release date: May 31, 2008 (Hoboken International Film Festival)
- Running time: 96 minutes
- Countries: Germany; Canada
- Language: English
- Budget: US$8 million
- Box office: US$35,402

Tunnel Rats (also known as 1968 Tunnel Rats) is a 2008 war suspense film written and directed by Uwe Boll. The film is based on the factual duties of tunnel rats during the Vietnam War. In a documentary for the film, Boll revealed the film did not have a script, and instead the actors improvised their lines. The box office return was poor and Tunnel Rats was met with mixed reviews.

== Plot ==
A group of US Army soldiers, trained in underground warfare, arrive at base camp in the jungle of South Vietnam. The soldiers spend the first day and night getting to know each other. The next morning they begin to explore the Viet Cong's tunnel network at Củ Chi. Led by Lieutenant Vic Hollowborn (Michael Pare) along with Platoon Sergeant Mike Heaney (Brad Schmidt) Corporal Dan Green (Wilson Bethel) and Privates Peter Harris (Mitch Eakins), Carl Johnson (Erik Eidem), Terence Verano (Rocky Marquette), Jonathon Porterson (Garikayi Mutambirwa), Dean Garraty (Adrian Collins), Samuel Graybridge (Brandon Fobbs), Jim Lidford (Nate Parker) and Bob Miller (Jeffery Christopher Todd).

Armed with nothing more than bayonets, pistols, grenades and flashlights, the US soldiers take to the tunnels in search and destroy operations, and begin to encounter dangers including primitive but lethal booby traps, such as punji sticks, grenades rigged with tripwire, as well as roving Viet Cong troops. Meanwhile, Garraty and Johnson are killed first, and later Sergeant Heaney and Verano are both killed as Green escapes, and up on the surface Harris and Lidford escape to the bottom of the tunnel, and Lidford is killed later on, Porterson successfully escapes through the tunnels. On the surface, the Viet Cong also attack the US base.

As things escalate above and below the ground, soldiers for both sides are pushed to the limits of their humanity. Miller and Graybridge try to escape, with the former barely making it, but Graybridge is killed. The events implicate that all (or almost all) the protagonists are killed by each other, by boobytraps, or by the airstrike ordered by the wounded US commanding officer Hollowborn, who called on it when everything seemed to have been lost. Green dies in the tunnels. Harris convinces Vo Mai (Jane Le) that he isn't a threat to her or her family. Porterson retreats to the surface and later meets Miller at the camp where many soldiers have been slaughtered by the North Vietnamese Army. Porterson and Miller witness the bombings and their ultimate fate or survival is left ambiguous. Harris and Mai try to dig their way out, slowly realizing they are both trapped with nowhere to go and had been left to die. They remain in the tunnels until the end of their days.

== Cast ==
- Michael Paré as Lieutenant Vic Hollowborn
- Nate Parker as Private Jim Lidford
- Jane Le as Vo Mai
- Erik Eidem as Private Carl Johnson
- Rocky Marquette as Private Terence Verano
- Jeffrey Christopher Todd as Private Bob Miller
- Brandon Fobbs as Private Samuel Graybridge
- John Wynn as Chien Nguyen
- Wilson Bethel as Corporal Dan Green
- Scot Cooper as Private Joseph Walderson
- Brad Schmidt as Sergeant Mike Heaney
- Scott Ly as Hy Tran
- John Wynn as Nguyen Van Chien
- Adrian Collins as Private Dean Garraty
- Garikayi Mutambirwa as Private Jonathon Porterson
- Erik Eidem as Private Carl Johnson
- Mitch Eakins as Private Peter Harris

== Reception ==
1968 Tunnel Rats was a box-office failure, earning less than $36,000 in ticket sales. The film's budget was $8 million.

Jeffrey M. Anderson of Combustible Celluloid gave the film 3/4 stars and wrote "If Boll had made this film in 1986, he might have won an Oscar and become the next Oliver Stone!" Bill Gibron of Filmcritic.com gave the film 3.5/5 stars, calling it "very good – and that's amazing, considering who's receiving said accolade."

On the negative side, Uwe Boll won the Golden Raspberry Award for Worst Director for his work on the film, which he also received for directing In the Name of the King and Postal.

== Video game ==
Uwe Boll also presented a video game of the same name based on the film. It was developed by Replay Studios using the Replay engine and was released on Steam on 15 May 2009.
