= Attack on Bari Alai =

2009 battle during the War in Afghanistan

- Part of the War in Afghanistan (2001–present)
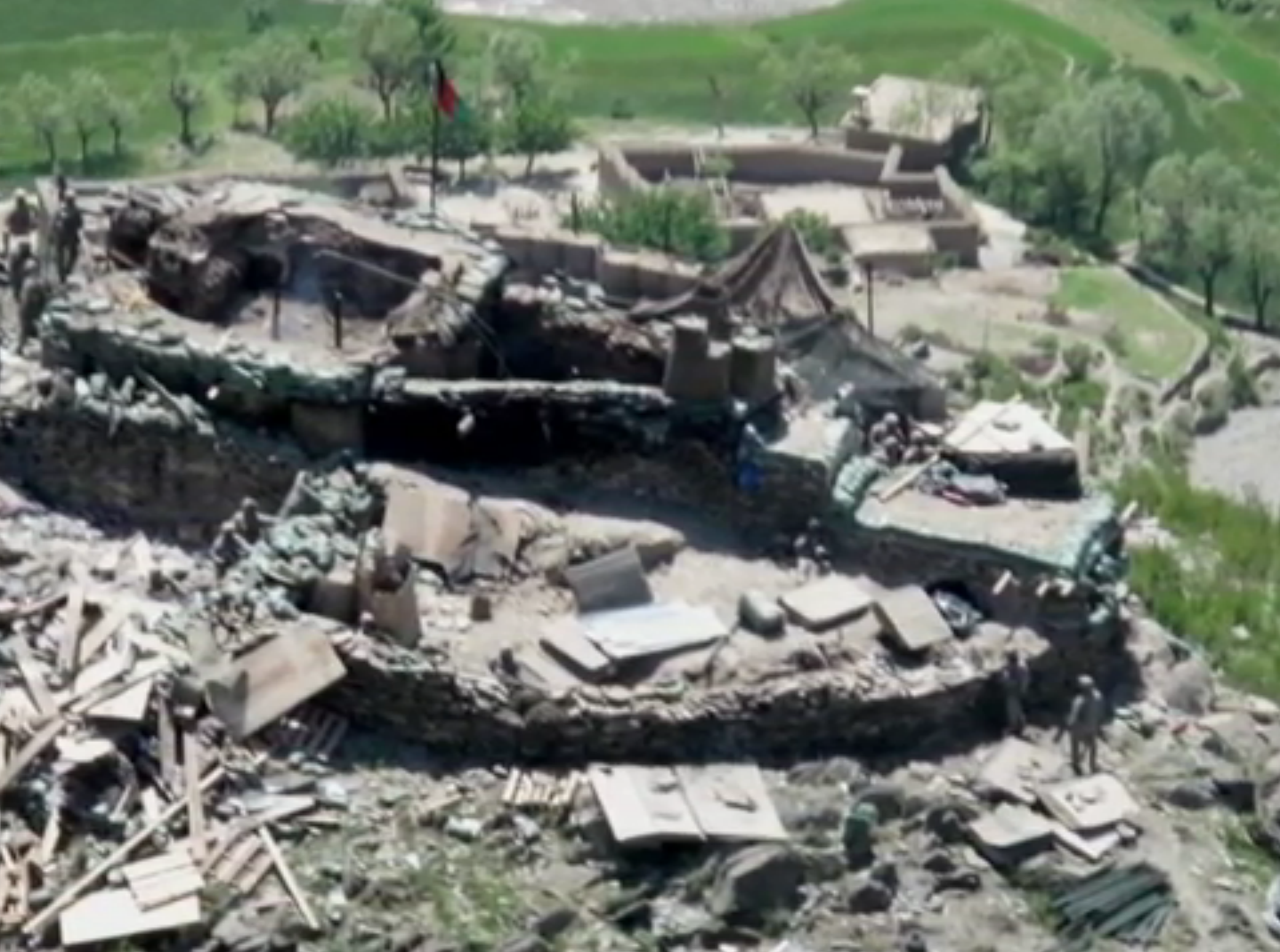
- Aftermath of attack on Observation Post Bari Alai (May 1, 2009)
Date	1 May 2009
Location	Observation Post Bari Alai, perimeter of Nishagam Kunar province, Afghanistan
Result	Taliban victory

Belligerents
United States; Latvia; Islamic Republic of Afghanistan	(Afghanistan) Taliban

Units involved
(United States) 6/4 Cavalry 3rd Brigade 1st Infantry Division (Latvia) 1st Infantry Battalion '1. Kājnieku' (Islamic Republic of Afghanistan) Afghan National Army	(Afghanistan) Unknown

Strength
(United States) 3 (Latvia) 4 (Islamic Republic of Afghanistan) 25; Total: 32	~Unknown

Casualties and losses
(United States) 3 killed (Latvia) 2 killed, 2 wounded (Islamic Republic of Afghanistan) 3 killed, 12 captured	Unknown

The attack on Bari Alai, also called the Battle of Nishagam, was an attack by Taliban insurgents on the International Security Assistance Force (ISAF) Observation Post (OP) Bari Alai in the perimeter of Nishagam in Kunar Province, Afghanistan, that took place on 1 May 2009. The attack was successful in being the first time during the War in Afghanistan that the Taliban had completely overrun a coalition outpost. Survivors were few, with the exception of two Latvian soldiers and a number of Afghan troops. The US detachment at the OP (three in total) were all killed in action.
