= Latvian Land Forces =

- Sauszemes spēki
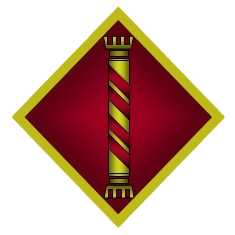
- Emblem of the Latvian Land Forces HQ
- Active: 1918–1940, 1991–present
- Country: Latvia
- Type: Army
- Role: Land warfare
- Size: 7,870 Professional soldiers 10,000 National Guard; 38,000 Reserve
- Part of: Latvian National Armed Forces
- Mottos: Vienotībā spēks (English: "Power in unity")
- Anniversaries: 30 April (Land Forces Day); 4 May (Independence Restoration and Armed Forces Day)
- Engagements: War of Independence; Iraq War; Multinational force in Iraq; War in Afghanistan; Attack on Bari Alai

Commanders
- Commander of the HQ: Colonel Oskars Kudlis

The Latvian Land Forces (Latvian: Sauszemes spēki, SzS) together with the Latvian National Guard form the land warfare branch of the Latvian National Armed Forces. From 2007 to 2024, the Land Forces were organized as a fully professional standing army until the re-introduction of conscription.

== Mission ==
The main missions of the national Land Forces are to:

- Provide for the defense of all national territories;
- Ensure combat readiness and the mobilization of units;
- Dispose of explosive ordnance;
- Provide public assistance.

== Organization ==
Latvian military units and bases

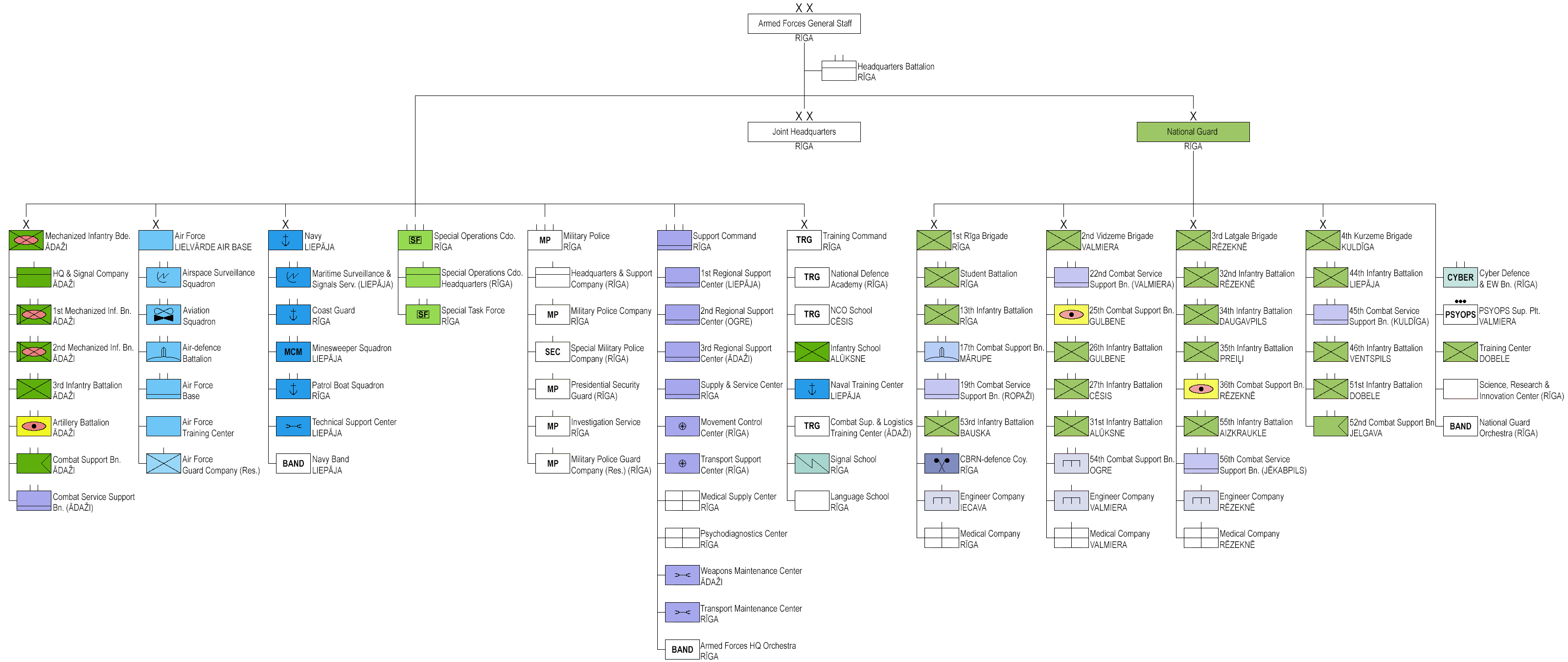
Latvian Armed Forces organization as of April 2026 (click to enlarge)

- Mechanized Infantry Brigade
  - Headquarters and Signal Company
  - 1st Mechanized Infantry Battalion
    - Headquarters and Signals Platoon
    - 3× Mechanized infantry companies
    - Combat Support Company
    - Combat Service Support Company
  - 2nd Mechanized Infantry Battalion
    - Headquarters and Signals Platoon
    - 3× Mechanized infantry companies
    - Combat Support Company
    - Combat Service Support Company
  - 3rd Infantry Battalion (Training unit)
    - Headquarters and Signals Platoon
    - 3× Infantry companies
    - Combat Service Support Company
  - Artillery Battalion (M109A5Ö self-propelled howitzers)
    - Headquarters and Signals Platoon
    - 3× Artillery batteries
    - Joint Fire Support Forward Observers (JFOs)
    - Joint Air Support Controllers (JTACs)
  - Combat Support Battalion
    - Headquarters and Signals Platoon
    - Reconnaissance Company
    - Air-defence Battery
    - Engineer Company
  - Combat Service Support Battalion
    - Headquarters and Signals Platoon
    - Supply and Transport Company
    - Technical Support and Maintenance Company
    - Medical Company
    - Security Company

== Cooperation ==
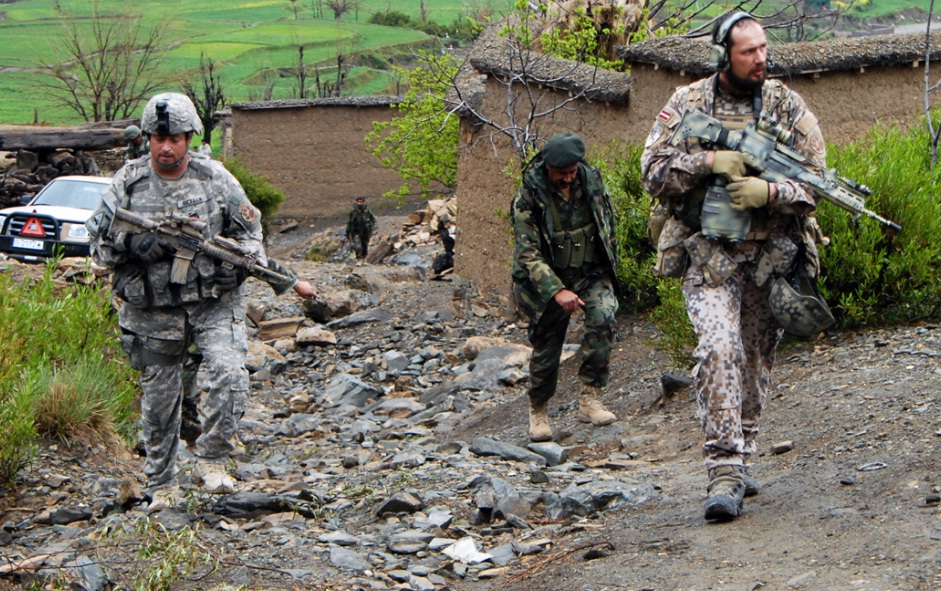
Latvian, US, and Afghan soldiers on patrol in Afghanistan

Since 1996 the National Armed Forces' soldiers have been deployed on nine international peace-keeping missions in Afghanistan, Albania, Bosnia, Central African Republic, Georgia, Iraq, Kosovo, North Macedonia and Somalia. Starting from January 1, 2015, Latvian Armed Forces are taking part in EU's Nordic Battle Group. On March 29, 2004, Latvia became a full member of NATO.

== Rank structure ==
The rank structure of the Latvian army is adjusted to the rank structure of the NATO countries in Europe. Rank insignia are worn historically on the collars and today also on shoulder marks. Starting 2016, only the Staff Battalion wears the collar insignia.

=== Commissioned officer ranks ===
The following are the current insignia of commissioned officers.

NATO code	OF-10	OF-9	OF-8	OF-7	OF-6	OF-5	OF-4	OF-3	OF-2	OF-1
Latvian Land Forces
Latvian Land Forces			Ģenerālleitnants	Ģenerālmajors	Brigādes ģenerālis	Pulkvedis	Pulkvežleitnants	Majors	Kapteinis	Virsleitnants	Leitnants

=== Other ranks ===
The rank insignia of non-commissioned officers and enlisted personnel.

NATO code	OR-9	OR-8	OR-7	OR-6	OR-5	OR-4	OR-3	OR-2	OR-1
Latvian Land Forces
Latvian Land Forces	Augstākais virsseržants	Galvenais virsseržants	Štāba virsseržants	Virsseržants	Seržants	Kaprālis	Dižkareivis	Kareivis
