= Crashday =

2006 video game

- Developer(s): Replay Studios; Moonbyte Games
- Publisher(s): Atari Europe
- Platform(s): Microsoft Windows
- Release: GER: 23 February 2006; NA: 20 December 2006; RU: 20 March 2006; POL: 3 March 2006; WW: 10 August 2017
- Genre(s): Racing
- Mode(s): Single-player, multiplayer

Crashday is a destruction derby/racing/car stunts game co-developed by Replay Studios and Moonbyte Games and published by Atari Europe. It was released in February 2006.

== Gameplay ==
Crashday puts the accent on air stunts, crashes that result in explosions, and vehicular combat with bullets. Each vehicle can receive damage while racing, which results in losing parts and smashed headlights and windows. The game has seven modes to play along the campaign and multiplayer such as Wrecking Match, Stunt Show or Race, as well as unique Crashday classics like Hold The Flag, Pass The Bomb or Bomb Run.

== Steam Greenlight and re-release ==
On 24 June 2016, Crashday was posted on Steam Greenlight submissions. Crashday was successful in receiving enough votes to be greenlit, and was later announced to be re-released on 10 August 2017. On 11 March 2017, the Steam version was renamed to "Crashday: Redline Edition", with some screenshots showing the new UI and the improved graphics. It was released on 10 August 2017.

== Reception ==
Reception

Review scores
Publication	Score
Computer and Video Games	6.5/10
Eurogamer	4.8/10
GameSpot	4.8/10
Hardcore Gamer	4/5
IGN	6/10
Jeuxvideo.com	10/20
Pelit	70%
Meristation	8/10
Svet Kompjutera	74%
