= Observation Post Bari Alai =

Afghan and U.S. observation post

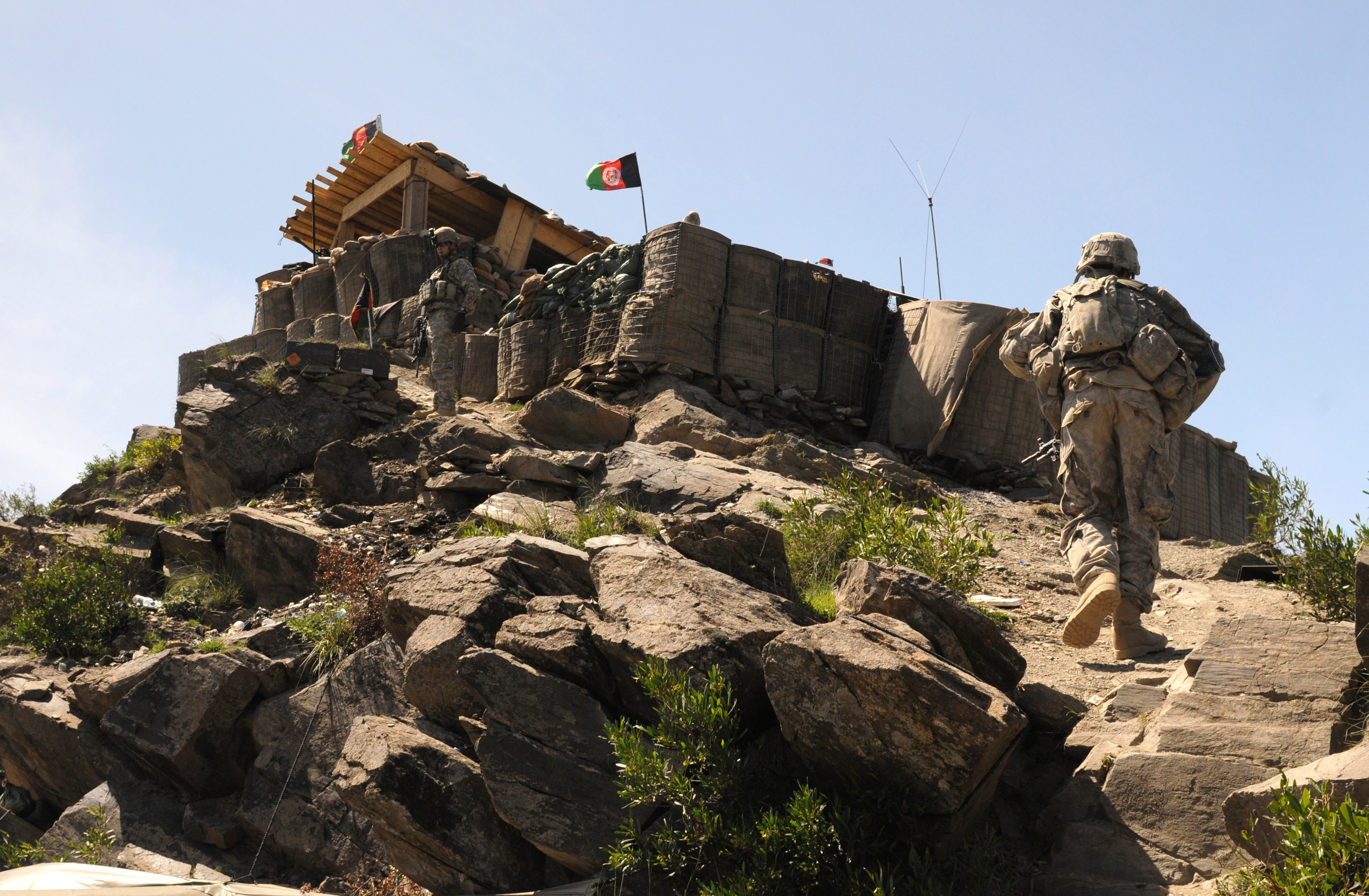
OP Bari Alai

Observation Post (OP) Bari Alai was a joint Afghan and U.S. observation post located in Eastern Afghanistan in Kunar Province. OP Bari Alai was established in the spring of 2009 by TF Raider (6/4 Cavalry, 3rd Brigade, 1st Infantry Division) and built by members of Marine Embedded Training Team 7–4, following increased attacks against U.S. and Afghan National Army (ANA) forces and civilians transiting north and south along the Konar river valley. OP Bari Alai was named after an ANA soldier who was killed in an IED strike just months before the creation of the OP. The OP was also aimed at providing security to the local district center just below the observation outpost.

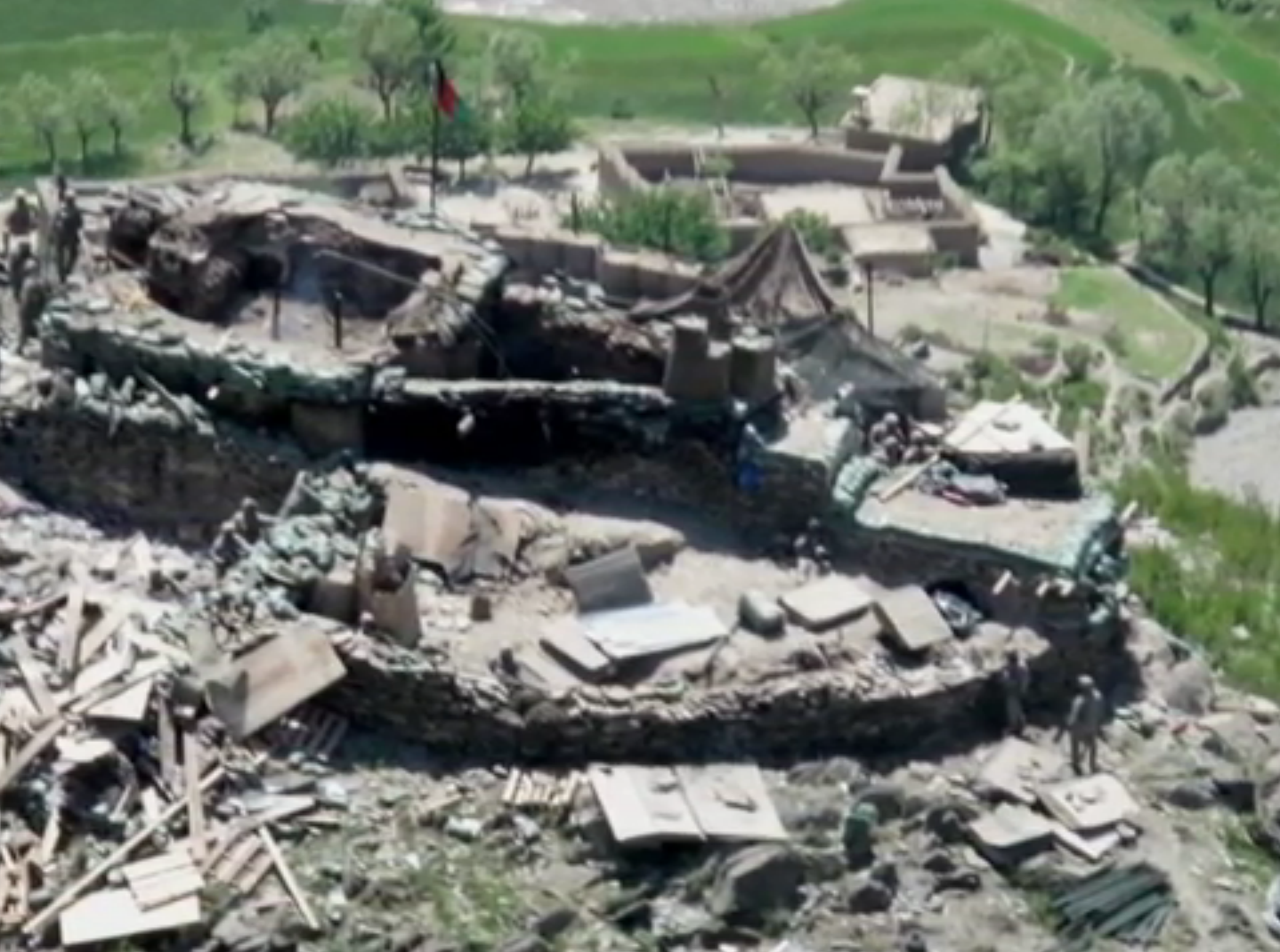
Aftermath of OP Bari Alai following the May 1st, 2009 attack.

== OP Bari Alai Attacks ==
OP Bari Alai is most famous for a large-scale Taliban attack on May 1, 2009, when an estimated force of 100-200 Taliban assaulted the Observation Post. The Taliban assault force successfully held the OP point, killing all three Americans (Ryan King, SGT James Pirtle, and SSG William "Bill" Vile) stationed at the OP,1 linguist Azizullah, 2 Latvian soldiers were killed and a 4th being wounded. 3 ANA soldiers were killed during the attack and 12 ANA soldiers and 1 linguist were taken prisoner by the Taliban. Taliban forces later released multiple videos of the attack in which the looting of OP Bari Alai and the escorting of prisoners is clearly seen. Following the attack on OP Bari Alai, a large military operation followed to secure the release of the 12 ANA soldiers taken captive. Hundreds of U.S., ANA, and Afghan National Army Commandos flooded the region, killing dozens of Taliban insurgents. The prisoners were then eventually released following the operation and they were debriefed concerning the events of the attacks.

According to U.S. military reporting OP Bari Alai was attacked several hundred times by Taliban fighters within the first year of its creation.
