= Velvet Assassin =

2009 video game

- Developer: Replay Studios
- Publisher: SouthPeak Games
- Director: Sascha Jungnickel
- Designer: Sascha Jungnickel
- Artist: Andreas Hackel
- Writer: Claus Wohlgemuth
- Composers: Mona Mur; Dynamedion
- Engine: Replay Engine
- Platforms: Xbox 360; Microsoft Windows; Mac OS X
- Release: NA: April 30, 2009; UK: May 8, 2009; AU: May 21, 2009; GER: July 10, 2009; OS X: WW: January 29, 2013
- Genre: Stealth
- Mode: Single-player

Velvet Assassin is a stealth video game developed by Replay Studios and published by SouthPeak Games. Prior to release, the game was known by the tentative title Sabotage 1943. It was released for Microsoft Windows and Xbox 360 in 2009, and on the Mac App Store in 2013. Velvet Assassin's working title was Sabotage. Players take control of Violette Summer, a World War II-era British Secret Intelligence Service spy operating deep behind enemy lines, attempting to thwart the Nazi war effort. The game's story was inspired by real-life secret agent/saboteur Violette Szabo.

== Plot ==
Born in Dorset, Violette Summer (voiced by Melinda Y. Cohen) grew up in a happy family and had a tremendous and active childhood. Initially, she started working in a beauty salon before the outbreak of war inspired her to move to London and join the weapon industry. It was not long before she was noticed by the Secret Service, as she was beautiful, athletic, and had great attention to detail. She was soon recruited into the Secret Intelligence Service during Britain's darkest hours. Violette had lost an aunt during one of the first Luftwaffe bombing attacks, and to further compound her heartache, she later lost her Royal Air Force husband in battle. However, Violette was strong-willed and used these painful experiences to inspire her to succeed as a spy for the SIS.

Violette managed to carry out several missions successfully before being gravely wounded by a sniper on a mission to kill Kamm, a Nazi military intelligence officer. Comatose in a hospital in France, Violette relives critical moments in a series of flashbacks. The bulk of gameplay takes place during these flashbacks. Missions include blowing up a fuel depot on the Maginot Line, assassinating a colonel in a Paris cathedral, stealing documents and marking a sub pen for bombers in Hamburg during Operation Gomorrah, and finding three secret agents in Warsaw. Moving through the city's sewer system, Violette finds one agent seriously wounded and another dead by cyanide poisoning. She passes through the Warsaw Ghetto, where the residents were either rounded up or executed, and makes her way to the Gestapo's Pawiak prison to give cyanide to the third agent.

Between these memories, scenes from the hospital are shown with two men arguing whether to keep Violette alive, give her up to the Schutzstaffel, or kill her to spare her the torture if captured by the Nazis. Her location is compromised, and Violette wakes from her coma to find the enemy troops entering the hospital. Escaping them, Violette finds the villagers being murdered or rounded up by a force from the Dirlewanger Brigade, a brutal SS unit of convicts, and taken to the church. Locking the villagers in, the soldiers set fire to the church. Violette is unsuccessful at freeing the villagers and collapses due to emotional and physical exhaustion. The enemy leader is shown to be Kamm, whose face was burned by Violette's assassination attempt. In the end credits, Violette is shown in her hospital gown, standing on a cliff overlooking a German plane.

== Gameplay ==
When the game begins, Violette is seen lying in a hospital bed from above. There are morphine syringes scattered across her bed, and the influx of drugs in her system creates a series of dreams that let her recount her past missions. Players have to hide in the shadows to avoid being detected. As a stealth-based game, lighting plays an important role. The HUD provides players with a silhouette of Violette, which can be in one of three states: purple means she is hidden in the shadows and invisible to enemies, white means she is exposed to light but not yet detected, and red means she has been spotted and enemies seek her position. She will either have to fight or escape if she is seen.

The game employs a unique lifeline if detected called "Morphine Mode". When triggered, Violette is shown in her hospital gown with blood drops on the screen. Violette can execute any alerted guards or escape for a limited amount of time. Players have limited use of the morphine lifeline. The game also occasionally makes use of "Blend Stealth". If Violette acquires a female SS uniform, she can change her attire at predefined points in the game. When Violette wears the SS uniform, guards will not identify her as a threat unless she moves too close to them or she performs a suspicious action, such as aiming a gun.

Violette's abilities can be upgraded by finding a range of collectibles scattered throughout her environment. Once the player reaches 1,000 experience points, her skills can be upgraded in one of three ways: either Improved Stealth (sneaking), Morphine, or Strength. The player can upgrade Violette's skills based on individual gameplay style.

== Promotion ==
SouthPeak Games worked with animator Peter Chung to produce a limited edition digital graphic novel based on the game. The novel was exclusively distributed to customers who preordered the game from GameStop.

Violette's Dream was an interactive experience to promote Velvet Assassin. Created by Yomi Ayeni and produced by Expanding Universe, a UK-based production company, the ARG sent participants on a real-life search for hidden treasure and real gold bars stamped with the Nazi insignia. Using various means of communication, as well as performances and real-life events, the players worked through an interactive story and engaged with various characters and organizations. One gold bar was found in a lock-up in Fredericksburg, Texas, and another at London Victoria station.

== Reception ==
Reception

Aggregate score
Aggregator	Score	
Aggregator	PC	Xbox 360
Metacritic	61/100	56/100

Review scores
Publication	Score	
Publication	PC	Xbox 360
Edge	N/A	4/10
Eurogamer	N/A	4/10
Famitsu	N/A	28/40
Game Informer	5.25/10	5.25/10
GamePro	N/A	2.5/5
GameSpot	7.5/10	7.5/10
GameTrailers	N/A	6.7/10
GameZone	7.7/10	N/A
Giant Bomb	N/A	1/5
IGN	5/10	5/10
Official Xbox Magazine (US)	N/A	6/10
PC Gamer (UK)	35%	N/A
The A.V. Club	N/A	C

Velvet Assassin received "mixed" reviews on both platforms according to the review aggregation website Metacritic.

IGN rated it 5/10, citing inconsistent stealth mechanics and a weak story. GameSpot's review disagreed and called it "a powerful, unnerving look at one of history's darkest periods", but criticized the game's poor AI and "lousy gunplay". GameZone praised the style and story of the game but disliked the predictability of the enemies. In Japan, where the Xbox 360 version was ported and published by Ubisoft on September 17, 2009, Famitsu gave it a score of 28 out of 40.
