= Replay Studios =

German game development studio

Replay Studios GmbH
- Company type: Private
- Industry: Video games
- Founded: 2002; 24 years ago
- Founders: Marc Moehring; Sascha Jungnickel
- Defunct: 3 August 2009
- Fate: Insolvency
- Headquarters: Hamburg, Germany
- Key people: Marc Moehring (managing director); Sascha Jungnickel (creative director)

Replay Studios GmbH was a German video game developer based in Hamburg. Founded in 2002 by Marc Moehring and Sascha Jungnickel, the company was best known for developing Velvet Assassin, which was released by SouthPeak Games in April 2009. However, the game failed to succeed commercially, because of which the company filed for insolvency and effectively dissolved in August that year.

== History ==
Replay Studios was founded in 2002 by Marc Moehring and Sascha Jungnickel, who later acted as managing director and creative director, respectively. Their first game, Crashday, was released by Atari in 2006. In July 2006, Replay Studios announced Sabotage, a stealth game set in World War II, in partnership with German publisher DTP Entertainment. The publishing rights switched hands to Gamecock Media Group in August 2007. In March 2008, the game was retitled Velvet Assassin, and in October 2008, Gamecock Media Group was acquired by SouthPeak Games, which took over the publishing of their upcoming games, including Velvet Assassin. The game was released in April 2009, ultimately to mixed reviews. The following month, Replay Studios released Tunnel Rats: 1968, a tie-in game for Uwe Boll's Tunnel Rats movie, to negative reception.

Following the poor commercial performance of Velvet Assassin and Tunnel Rats: 1968, it was reported on 3 August 2009 that the company had filed for insolvency. The closure was confirmed by Replay Studios' lead programmer, Claus Praefcke, the following day. Survivor, a game announced in October 2004 that would have revolved around surviving disastrous events, such as the sinking of the RMS Titanic, Hurricane Andrew, the September 11 attacks, the atomic bombing of Hiroshima, as well as the 1985 Mexico City earthquake, was never released.

== Games developed ==
Year	Title	Platform(s)	Publisher(s)
2006	Crashday	Microsoft Windows	Atari, ValuSoft
2009	Velvet Assassin	macOS, Microsoft Windows, Xbox 360	SouthPeak Games
2009	Tunnel Rats: 1968	Microsoft Windows	Boll AG
Cancelled	Survivor	Microsoft Windows, PlayStation 3, Xbox 360	—N/a
