= Củ Chi tunnels =

Network of tunnels in Ho Chi Minh City, Vietnam

Coordinates: 11°03′39″N 106°31′43″E

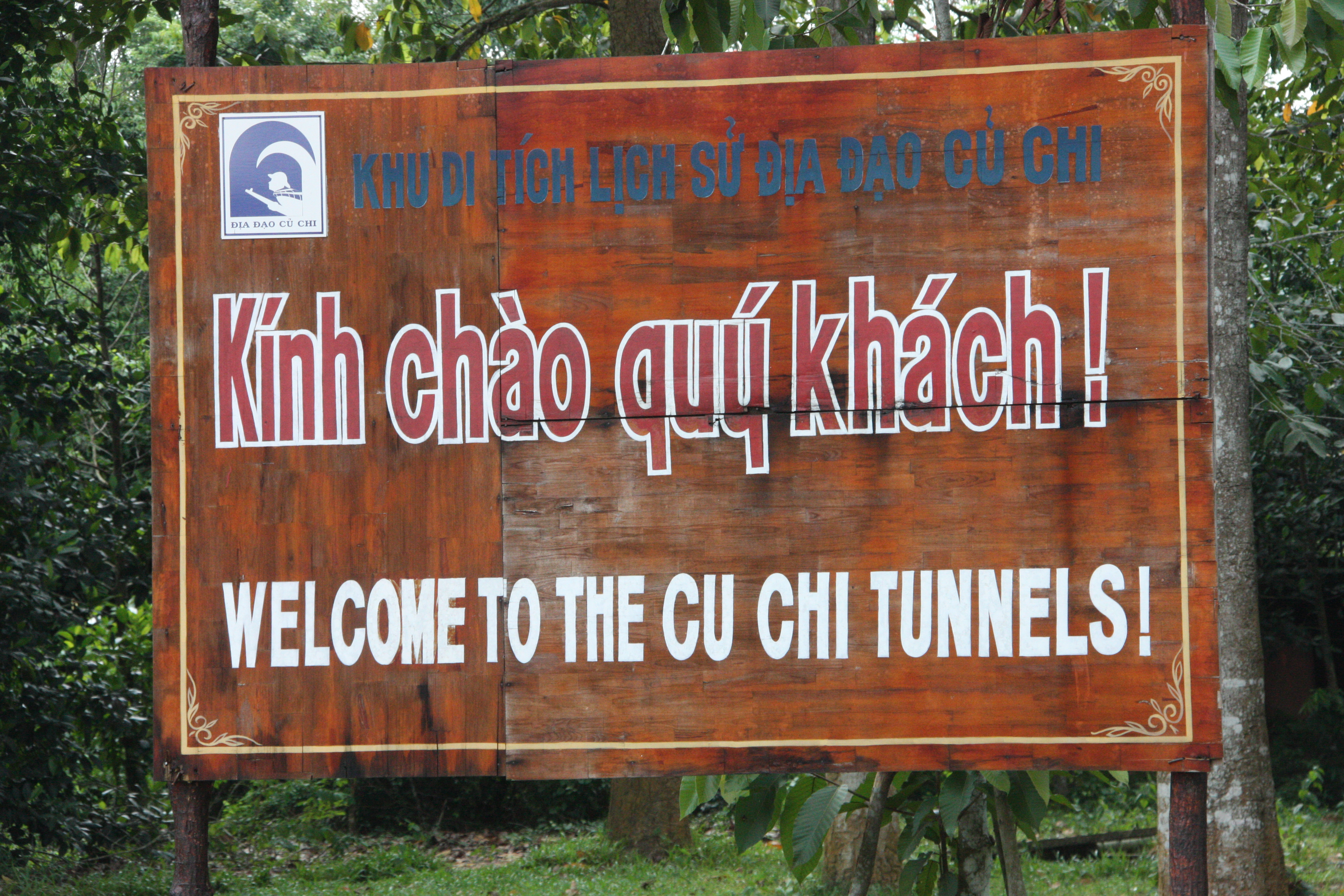
Entrance sign at the tunnels.

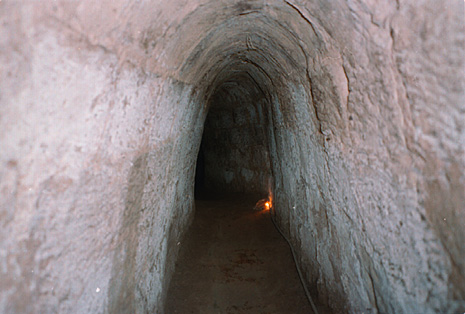
Part of the tunnel complex at Củ Chi, this tunnel has been made wider and taller to accommodate tourists.

The tunnels of Củ Chi (Vietnamese: Địa đạo Củ Chi) are an immense network of connecting tunnels located in the Củ Chi District of Ho Chi Minh City (Saigon), Vietnam, and are part of a much larger network of tunnels that underlie much of the country. The Củ Chi tunnels were the location of several military campaigns during the Vietnam War, and were the Viet Cong's base of operations for the Tết Offensive in 1968.

Location of Củ Chi tunnels in Ho Chi Minh City

The tunnels were used by Viet Cong soldiers as hiding spots during combat, as well as serving as communication and supply routes, hospitals, food and weapon caches and living quarters for numerous North Vietnamese fighters. The tunnel systems were of great importance to the Viet Cong in their resistance to American and ARVN forces, and helped to counter the growing American military presence.

The tunnels contained various bamboo traps made by the Viet Cong to injure and potentially kill American Tunnel Rats if they breached the tunnels. The tunnels also contained ventilation shafts to release smoke from fire and any poisonous gases pumped into the tunnels by the American troops.

== Life in tunnels ==
American soldiers used the term "Black Echo" to describe the conditions within the tunnels. For the Viet Cong, life in the tunnels was difficult. Air, food, and water were scarce, and the tunnels were infested with ants, venomous centipedes, snakes, scorpions, spiders, and rodents. Most of the time, soldiers would spend the day in the tunnels working or resting and come out only at night to scavenge for supplies, tend their crops, or engage the enemy in battle. Sometimes, during periods of heavy bombing or American troop movement, they would be forced to remain underground for many days at a time. In the 1991 movie documentary The Cu Chi Tunnels Vietcong survivors who hid in the tunnels during Operation Crimp named the artillery bombardments above them "The New Zealand Dong Dun Orchestra." Sickness was rampant among the people living in the tunnels, especially malaria, which was the second largest cause of death next to battle wounds. A captured Viet Cong report suggests that at any given time, half of a unit of the People's Liberation Armed Forces (PLAF) unit had malaria and that "one-hundred percent had intestinal parasites of significance."

== U.S. campaigns against tunnels ==
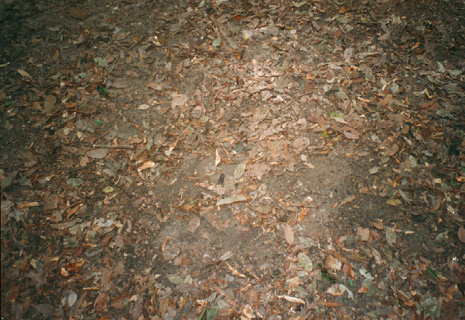
A trap door on the jungle floor leads down into the Củ Chi tunnels. Closed and camouflaged, it is almost undetectable.

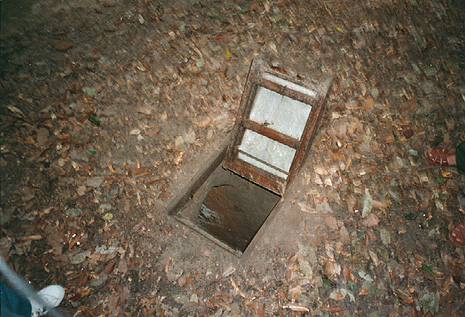
The camouflaged trap door, now open.

The tunnels of Củ Chi were noticed by U.S. officials, who recognized the advantages that the Viet Cong held with the tunnels and so launched several major campaigns to search out and destroy the tunnel system. Among the most important were Operation Crimp and Operation Cedar Falls.

Operation Crimp began on January 7, 1966, with B-52 bombers dropping 30-ton loads of high explosive onto the region of Củ Chi, effectively turning the once lush jungle into a pockmarked moonscape. Eight thousand troops from the U.S. 1st Infantry Division, 173rd Airborne Brigade (including an artillery battery of the Royal Regiment of New Zealand Artillery), and the 1st Battalion, Royal Australian Regiment combed the region looking for any clues of PLAF activity.

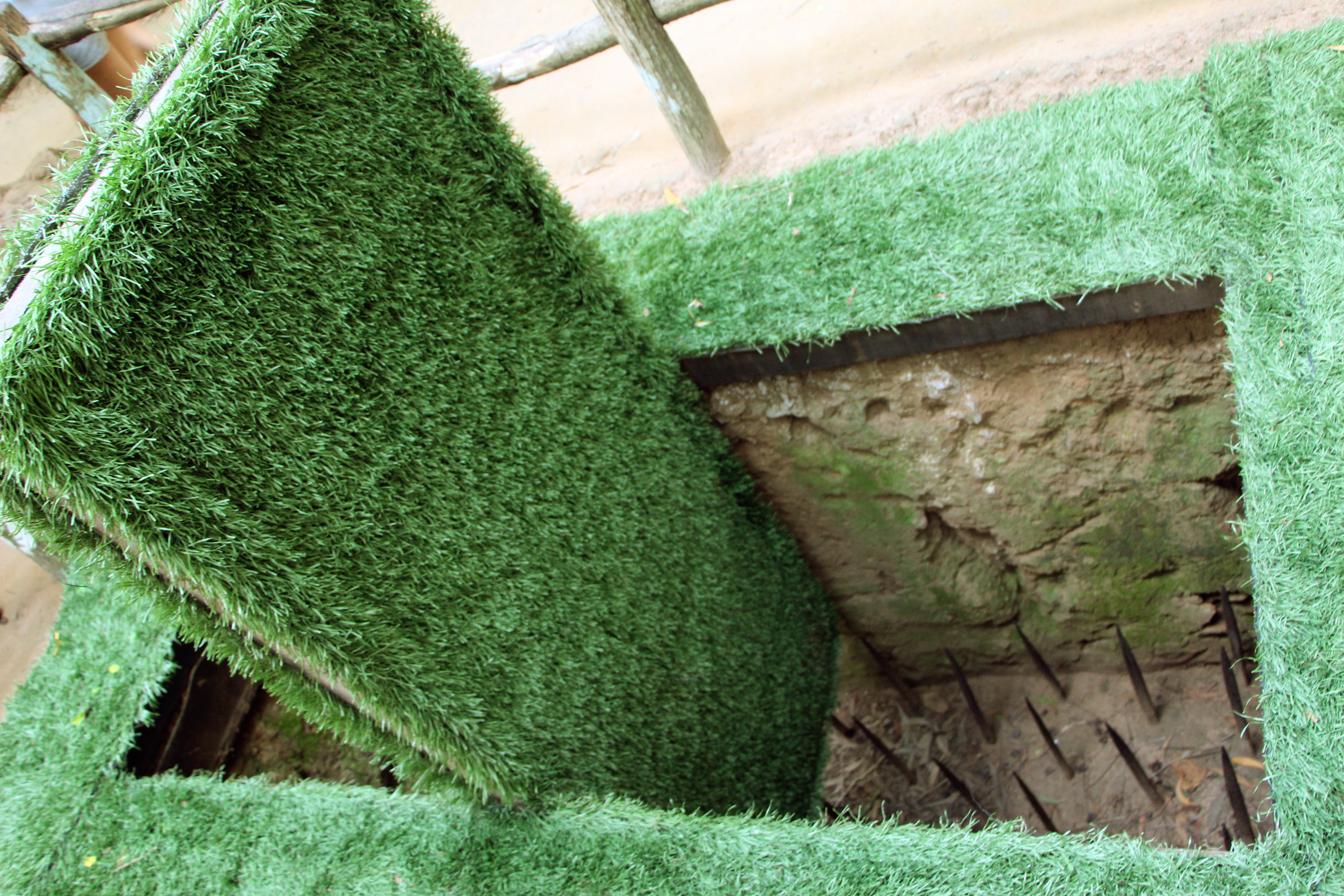
A booby trap with punji sticks.

The operation did not bring about the desired success. For instance, when troops found a tunnel, they would often underestimate its size. No one was usually sent in to search the tunnels, as it was so hazardous. The tunnels were often rigged with explosive booby traps or punji stick pits. The two most common responses in dealing with a tunnel opening would be to flush the entrance with gas, water or hot tar to force the Viet Cong soldiers into the open or to toss a few grenades down the hole and "crimp" off the opening. Those approaches proved ineffective because of the design of the tunnels and the strategic use of trap doors and air filtration systems.

However, an Australian specialist engineering troop, 3 Field Troop, under the command of Captain Alexander "Sandy" MacGregor ventured into the tunnels, which they searched exhaustively for four days, and found ammunition, radio equipment, medical supplies, food, and signs of considerable Viet Cong presence. One of their number, Corporal Robert "Bob" Bowtell, died when he became trapped in a tunnel that turned out to be a dead end. However, the Australians pressed on and revealed for the first time the immense military significance of the tunnels. At an international press conference in Saigon shortly after Operation Crimp, MacGregor referred to his men as "tunnel ferrets." An American journalist who had never heard of ferrets, used the term "tunnel rat," and it stuck. After his troop's discoveries in Củ Chi, MacGregor was awarded a Military Cross.

From its mistakes and the Australians' discoveries, U.S. command realised that it needed a new way to approach the dilemma of the tunnels. A general order was issued by General Williamson, the Allied Forces Commander in South Vietnam, to all Allied forces that tunnels had to be properly searched whenever they were discovered. It began training an elite group of volunteers in the art of tunnel warfare, armed only with a handgun, a knife, a flashlight, and a piece of string. The specialists, commonly known as "tunnel rats", would enter a tunnel by themselves and travel inch-by-inch cautiously looking ahead for booby traps or cornered PLAF. There was no real doctrine for the approach, and despite some very hard work in some sectors of the Army and the Military Assistance Command, Vietnam, to provide some sort of training and resources, it was primarily a new approach that the units trained, equipped, and planned for themselves.

Despite the revamped effort at fighting the enemy on their own terms, U.S. operations remained insufficient at eliminating the tunnels completely. In 1967, General William Westmoreland tried to launch a larger assault on Củ Chi and the Iron Triangle. Called Operation Cedar Falls, it was similar to the previous Operation Crimp but was on a larger scale with 30,000 troops, instead of 8,000. On January 18, tunnel rats from the 1st Battalion, 5th Infantry Regiment, 25th Infantry Division uncovered the Viet Cong district headquarters of Củ Chi, containing half a million documents concerning all types of military strategy. Among the documents were maps of U.S. bases, detailed accounts of PLAF movement from Cambodia into Vietnam, lists of political sympathizers, and even plans for a failed assassination attempt on Robert McNamara.

By 1969, B-52s were freed from bombing North Vietnam and started "carpet bombing" Củ Chi and the rest of the Iron Triangle. Towards the end of the war, some of the tunnels were so heavily bombed that some portions actually caved in, and other sections were exposed. But the bombings were not able to destroy most parts of those tunnels.

Throughout the war, the tunnels in and around Củ Chi proved to be a source of frustration for the U.S. military in Saigon. The Viet Cong had been so well entrenched in the area by 1965 that it was in the unique position of being able to control where and when battles would take place. By helping to covertly move supplies and house troops, the tunnels of Củ Chi allowed North Vietnamese fighters in their area of South Vietnam to survive, help prolong the war and increase U.S. costs and casualties until the eventual withdrawal in 1973, and the final defeat of South Vietnam in 1975.

== Tourist destinations ==
Video showing Củ Chi Tunnels complex

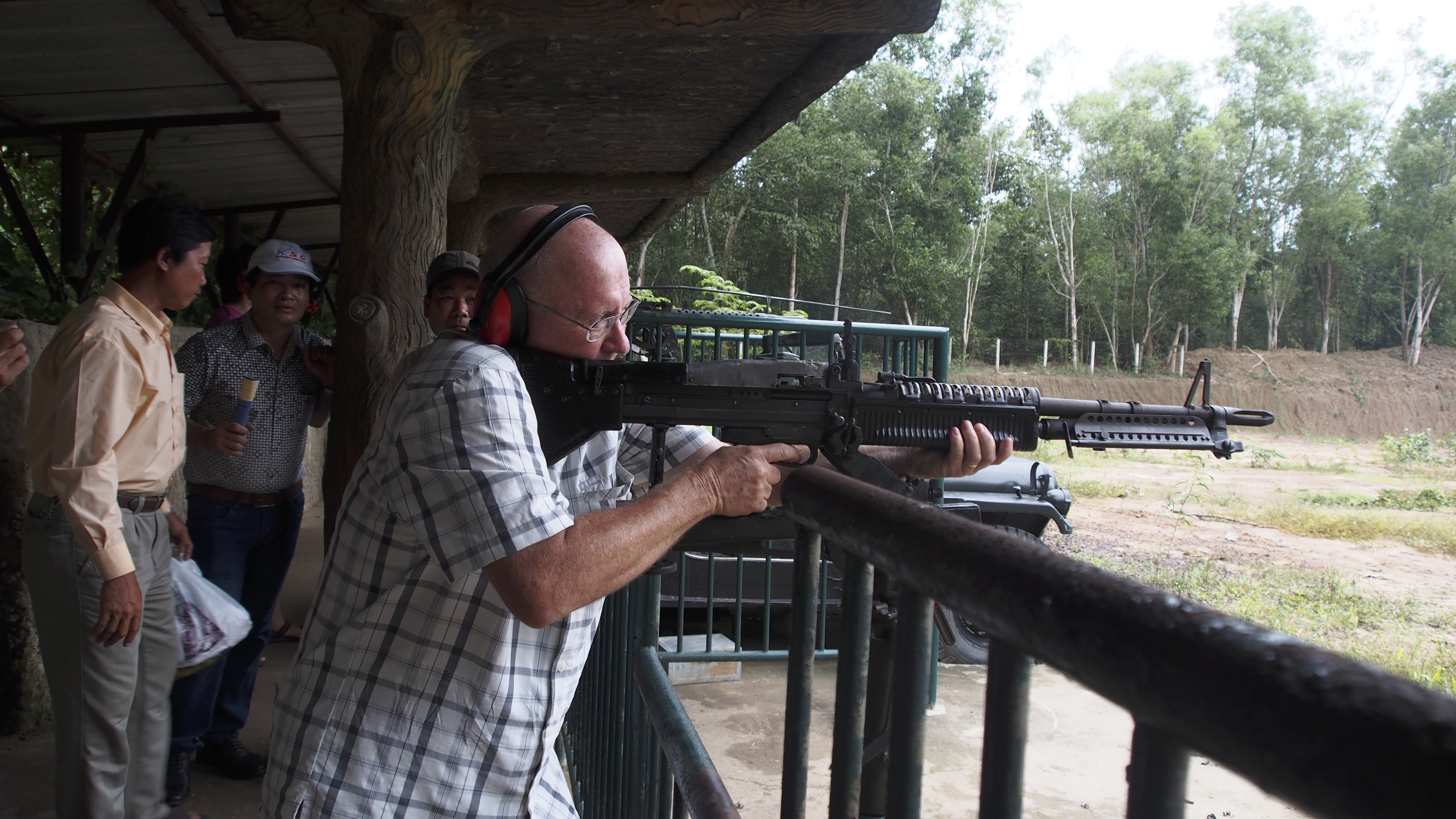
Tourist shooting an M60 machine-gun at the Củ Chi Tunnels complex

The 75-mile (121 km)-long complex of tunnels at Củ Chi has been preserved by the government of Vietnam after reunification, and turned into a war memorial park with two different tunnel display sites, Bến Đình and Bến Dược. The tunnels are a popular tourist attraction in Vietnam, and visitors are invited to crawl around in the safer parts of the tunnel system. The Bến Dược site contains part of the original tunnel system, and the Bến Đình site, closer to Ho Chi Minh City, has tunnel reconstructions and some tunnels have been made larger to accommodate tourists. In both sites, low-power lights have been installed in the tunnels to make traveling through them easier, and both sites have displays of the different types of booby traps that were used. Underground conference rooms in which campaigns such as the Tết Offensive were planned in 1968 have been restored.

Above-ground attractions include caged monkeys, vendors selling souvenirs, and a shooting range. There is a film shown to tourists which praises Viet Cong fighters as "American Killer Heroes".

== In popular culture ==
- Tunnel: Sun in the Dark – 2025 film set in the Củ Chi Tunnels during the Vietnam War.

== See also ==
- Vịnh Mốc tunnels
- Củ Chi Base Camp
- Tunnel warfare
- Urban warfare
- Tunel De Gondra
- Palestinian tunnel warfare in the Gaza Strip
- Hezbollah tunnels

== Sources ==
- The Tunnels of Cu Chi, Tom Mangold & John Penycate, Berkley Books, New York, 1986, ISBN 0-425-08951-7
- Tunnel Rats by Jimmy Thomson with Sandy MacGregor (Allen & Unwin, Australia, 2011)(Website)
- A Sappers War by Jimmy Thomson with Sandy MacGregor (Allen & Unwin, Australia, 2012)
