= Tunnel rat =

Soldiers who performed underground search and destroy missions in Vietnam

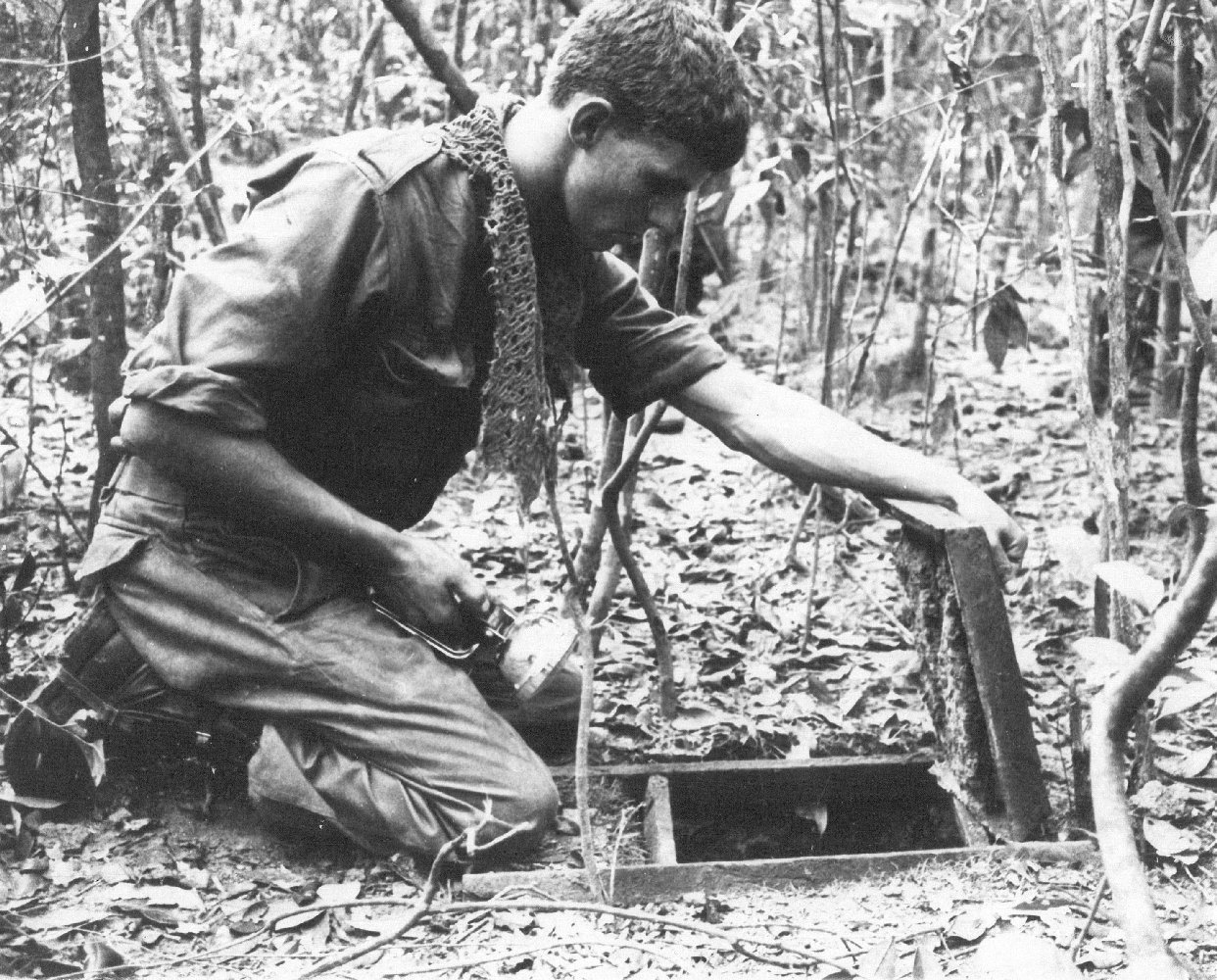
An Australian tunnel rat looking into a Viet Cong tunnel discovered during Operation Crimp, Vietnam

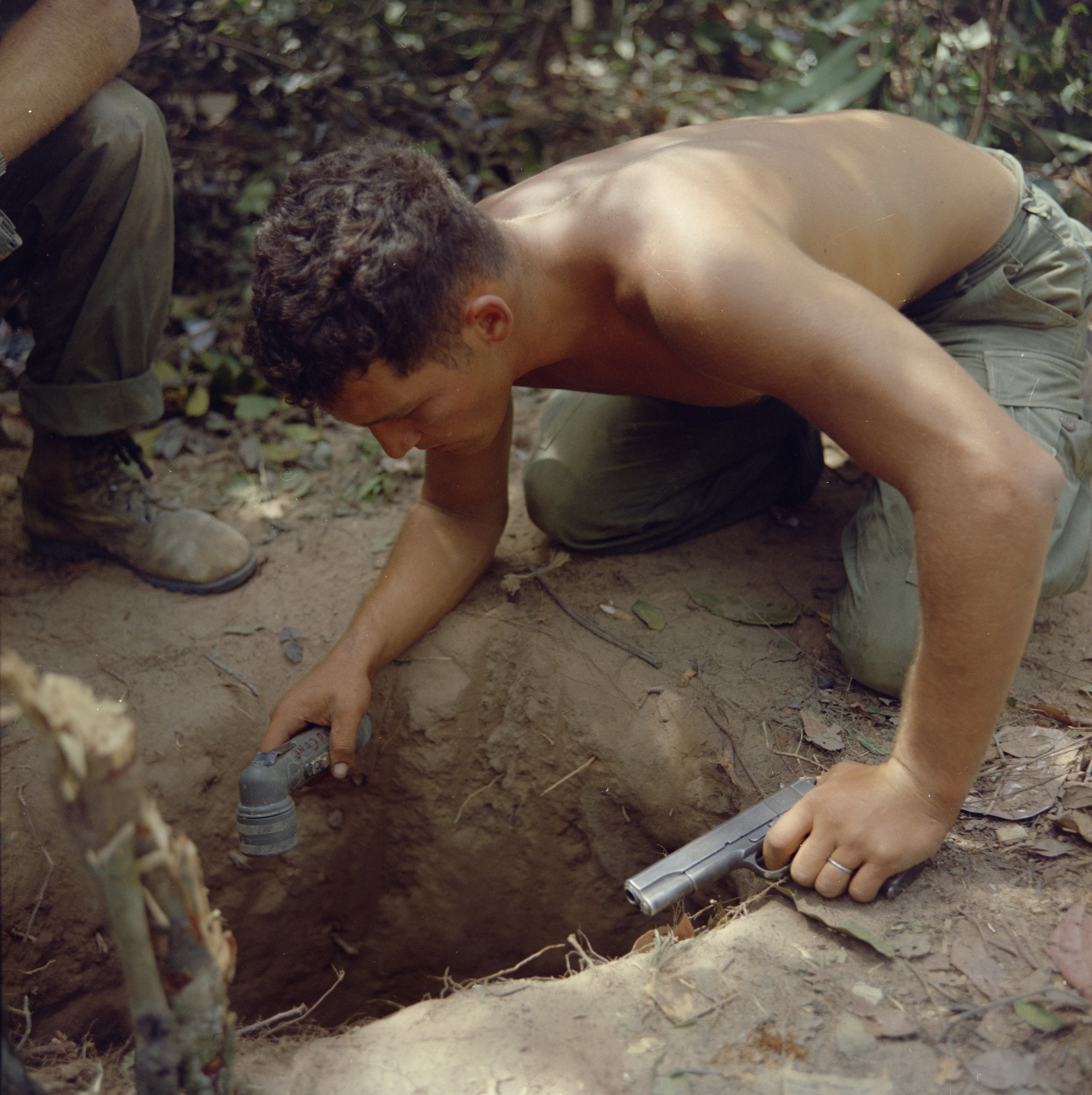
Sgt. Ronald H. Payne entering a tunnel in search of Viet Cong with a flashlight and M1911 pistol

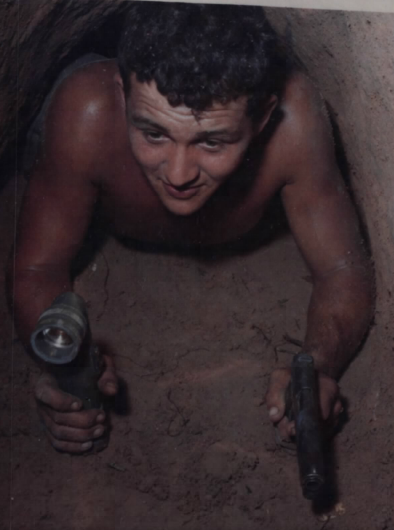
Sgt. Ronald H. Payne moves through a tunnel in search of Viet Cong with a flashlight and M1911 pistol.

The tunnel rats were American, Australian, New Zealand, and South Vietnamese soldiers who performed underground search and destroy missions during the Vietnam War.

Later, similar teams were used by the Soviet Army during the Soviet–Afghan War.

== In the Vietnam War ==
During the Vietnam War, "tunnel rat" became an unofficial specialty for volunteer combat engineers and infantrymen from the Australian Army and the U.S. Army who cleared and destroyed enemy tunnel complexes. Their motto was the tongue-in-cheek Dog Latin phrase Non Gratum Anus Rodentum ("not worth a rat's ass").

In the early stages of the war against the French colonial forces, the Viet Minh created an extensive underground system of tunnels, which was later expanded and improved by the Viet Cong. By the 1960s, the tunnel complexes included hospitals, training areas, storage facilities, headquarters, and barracks. These diverse facilities, coupled with sophisticated ventilation systems, allowed VC guerrillas to remain hidden underground for months at a time.

During the Vietnam War, ANZUS troops uncovered a great number of enemy tunnels while patrolling or conducting larger operations. The men of the 3 Field Troop, an Australian combat engineering unit that served in Vietnam from 1965 to 1966, have made a convincing argument that they were the first allied troops to enter the tunnels. Tunnel rats were given the task of destroying them, gathering intelligence within them, and killing or capturing their occupants—often in conditions of close combat. Typically, a tunnel rat was equipped with only a standard issue M1911 pistol or M1917 revolver, a bayonet, a flashlight, and explosives.

Many tunnel rats reportedly came to dislike the intense muzzle blast of the relatively large .45 caliber round, as the .45's loud report could often leave one temporarily deaf when fired in a confined space. Consequently, some preferred to clear tunnels armed with a .38 Special revolver equipped with a sound suppressor and other non-standard weapons. "A few of the OSS-ordered World War II era suppressed High Standard HD .22 automatics made their way into Tunnel Rat hands. But these weapons were very few in number and wanted by a number of other special units. Personal weapons were used by the rats, ranging from .25 caliber automatics to sawn-off shotguns."

Besides enemy combatants, the tunnels themselves presented many potential dangers to tunnel rats. Sometimes they were poorly constructed and they would simply collapse. Tunnels were often booby trapped with hand grenades, anti-personnel mines, and punji sticks. The VC would even use venomous snakes (placed as living booby traps). Rats, spiders, scorpions, centipedes and ants also posed threats to tunnel rats. Bats also roosted in the tunnels, although they were generally more of a nuisance than a threat. Tunnel construction occasionally included anti-intruder features such as U-bends that could be flooded quickly to trap and drown the tunnel rat. Sometimes poison gases were used. A tunnel rat might therefore choose to enter the tunnels wearing a gas mask (donning one within was frequently impossible in such a confined space). According to U.S. tunnel rat veterans, however, most tunnel rats usually went without gas masks because wearing one made it even harder to see, hear, and breathe in the narrow dark passage ways.

Tunnel rats were generally men of smaller stature (165 cm (5 ft 5 in) and under), who were able to maneuver more comfortably in the narrow tunnels. Tom Mangold and John Penycate, authors of one of the definitive accounts of tunnel warfare during the Vietnam War, reported that the U.S. tunnel rats were almost exclusively soldiers of Non-Hispanic white or Hispanic descent, many of whom were Puerto Rican or Mexican American.

Video showing Củ Chi Tunnels complex

By Mangold and Penycate's account, the tunnel rats first garnered public attention in January 1966, after a combined U.S. and Australian operation against the Củ Chi tunnels in Bình Dương Province, known as Operation Crimp. The "Diehards" of the U.S. Army's 1st Engineer Battalion later were tunnel rats during their rotation through the Củ Chi District of South Vietnam in 1969.

== In Afghanistan ==
Afghanistan features an extensive series of historic tunnels used for transporting water and the "kariz." During the 1979–1989 Soviet war in Afghanistan, such tunnels were used by Mujahideen fighters. The Soviet 40th Army therefore fielded their own tunnel clearance and demolition units, which were given the task of clearing the tunnels of enemy combatants, disarming booby traps, and destroying the underground complexes. According to contemporary accounts, the U.S. Marine Corps and British Royal Marines were involved in similar work in the war in Afghanistan.

== In Israel ==
SAMOOR (Hebrew: סמור, "weasel"), a formation within Israel's Yahalom elite combat engineer unit, is charged with many of the same missions that tunnel rats performed during the Vietnam War.

== In popular culture ==
- Tunnel Rats, also known as 1968 Tunnel Rats, is a 2008 German-Canadian Vietnam war film written and directed by Uwe Boll.
- Breaking Point, is a 2021 Canadian Vietnam war short film that involves combat in tunnels, written and directed by Ben Crossman
- In Call of Duty: Black Ops , one level in Vietnam has the player crawl through a tunnel with an allied soldier accompanying them called Swift. Swift dies in the tunnel, but the player is able to escape the tunnel later on.

== See also ==
- Mines on the Italian front (World War I)
- Palestinian tunnel warfare in the Gaza Strip

== Sources ==
- Mangold, Tom; John Penycate (2005). The Tunnels of Cu Chi. Presidio Press. ISBN 0-89141-869-5.
- Rottman, Gordon (2006). Viet Cong and NVA Tunnels and Field Fortifications of the Vietnam War. Osprey Publishing. ISBN 1-84603-003-X.
- Rottman, Gordon (2012). Tunnel Rat in Vietnam. Osprey Publishing. ISBN 978-1-84908-783-4.
- Kirchner, Paul (2009). More of the Deadliest Men Who Ever Lived. Paladin Press. ISBN 978-1-58160-690-4.
  - Marett, Jim (February 9, 2018). "My Life as a Tunnel Rat". New York Times.
