= 3rd Brigade Combat Team, 1st Infantry Division =

3rd Infantry Brigade Combat Team, 1st Infantry Division
- 1st Infantry Division shoulder sleeve insignia
- Active: 1963–2014
- Country: United States
- Branch: United States Army
- Type: Infantry
- Size: Brigade
- Garrison/HQ: Fort Knox
- Nickname: The Duke Brigade Dukes of Diyala

Commanders
- Current commander: COL Bill Ostlund
- Notable commanders: MG Dana J.H. Pittard

The 3rd Infantry Brigade Combat Team was an infantry brigade based at Fort Knox, Kentucky. The brigade is a subordinate unit of 1st Infantry Division.

== History ==
The 3rd Brigade Combat Team, 1st Infantry Division, since it was constituted, has been organized, reorganized, Inactivated, disbanded, reconstituted, and redesignated several times.

- Constituted 24 May 1917 in the Regular Army as Headquarters Troop, 1st Expeditionary Division
- Organized 8 June 1917 at New York, New York
- Reorganized and redesignated 6 July 1917 as Headquarters Troop, 1st Division
- Reorganized and redesignated 13 February 1921 as Headquarters and Military Police Company (less Military Police Platoon), 1st Division
- Reorganized and redesignated 1 August 1942 as Headquarters Company, 1st Infantry Division
- Disbanded 20 April 1960 at Fort Riley, Kansas
- Reconstituted 23 October 1963 in the Regular Army as Headquarters and Headquarters Company, 3rd Brigade, 1st Infantry Division
- Activated 2 January 1964 at Fort Riley, Kansas
- Redesignated 21 July 1975 as Headquarters and Headquarters Company, 1st Infantry Division Forward
- Inactivated 15 August 1991 in Germany
- Redesignated 16 February 1996 as Headquarters and Headquarters Company, 3d Brigade, 1st Infantry Division, and activated in Germany
- Headquarters, 3rd Brigade, 1st Infantry Division, reorganized and redesignated 16 April 2007 as Headquarters, 3d Brigade Combat Team, 1st Infantry Division (Headquarters Company, 3d Brigade, 1st Infantry Division – hereafter separate lineage)
- Inactivation Ceremony at Fort Knox, KY - 21 May 2014
- Reactivated

== Organization ==
The unit is composed of:

- Headquarters & Headquarters Company (HHC) ("Hellfighters")
- Special Troops Battalion (STB) ("Valiant Warrior")
- 2nd Battalion, 63rd Armor Regiment ("Lions")
- 2nd Battalion, 2nd Infantry Regiment ("Ramrods")
- 1st Battalion, 26th Infantry Regiment ("Blue Spaders")
- 6th Squadron, 4th Cavalry Regiment ("Raiders")
- 1st Battalion, 6th Field Artillery Regiment (1-6th FAR) ("Centaurs")
- 201st Brigade Support Battalion (201st BSB) ("Thor")
