= Punji stick =

Booby-trapped stake or spike

The punji sticks or punji stake is a type of booby trapped stake. It is a simple spike, made out of wood or bamboo, which is sharpened, heated, and usually set in a hole. They are banned by the Geneva Convention. Punji sticks are usually deployed in substantial numbers. The Oxford English Dictionary (third edition, 2007) lists less frequent, earlier spellings for "punji stake (or stick)": panja, panjee, panjie, panji, and punge.

== Description ==
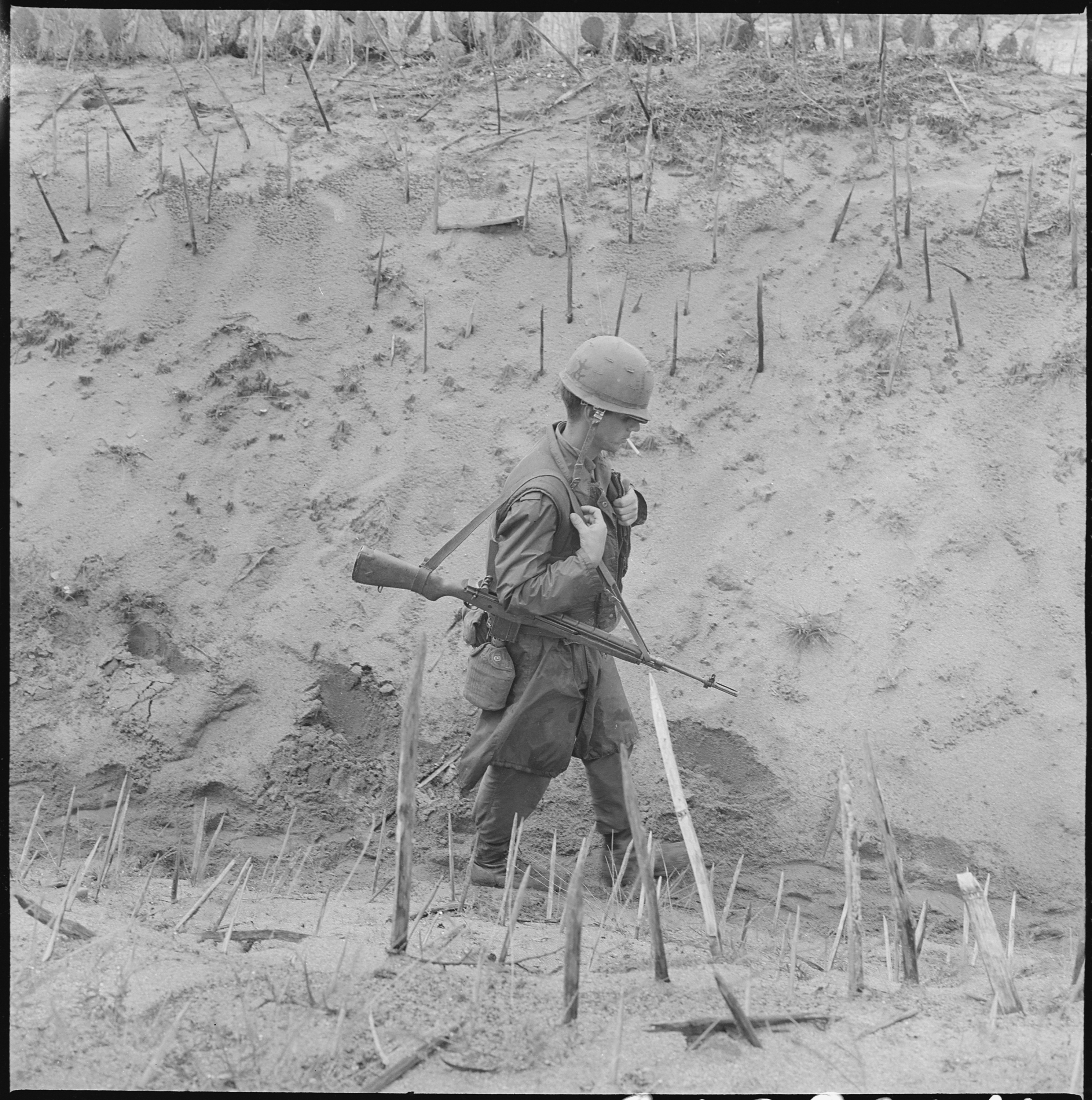
Punji sticks used during the Vietnam War, photo from 1966

Punji sticks would be placed in areas likely to be passed through by enemy troops. The presence of punji sticks may be camouflaged by natural undergrowth, crops, grass, brush or similar materials. They were often incorporated into various types of traps; for example, a camouflaged pit into which a soldier might fall (it would then be a trou de loup).

Sometimes a pit would be dug with punji sticks in the sides pointing downward at an angle. A soldier stepping into the pit would find it impossible to remove their leg without doing severe damage, and injuries might be incurred by the simple act of falling forward while one's leg is in a narrow, vertical, stake-lined pit. Such pits would require time and care to dig the soldier's leg out, immobilizing the unit longer than if the foot were simply pierced, in which case the victim could be evacuated by stretcher or fireman's carry if necessary.

Other additional measures include coating the sticks in poison from plants, animal venom, or even human feces, causing infection or poisoning in the victim after being pierced by the sticks, even if the injury itself was not life-threatening.

Punji sticks were sometimes deployed in the preparation of an ambush. Soldiers lying in wait for the enemy to pass would deploy punji sticks in the areas where the surprised enemy might be expected to take cover, resulting in soldiers diving for cover potentially impaling themselves.

The point of penetration was usually in the foot or lower leg area. Punji sticks were not necessarily meant to kill the person who stepped on them; rather, they were sometimes designed specifically to only wound the enemy and slow or halt their unit while the victim was evacuated to a medical facility.

Punji sticks were banned as part of a 1980 amendment to the Geneva Convention, as part of a broader effort to ban traps that are not dismantled after a conflict.

== Vietnam War ==
In the Vietnam War, this method was used to force wounded soldiers to be transported by helicopter to a medical hospital for treatment.

Punji sticks were also used in Vietnam to complement various defenses, such as barbed wire.

While on patrol Colin Powell, a future U.S. Secretary of State, was wounded after stepping on a punji stake and was awarded a Purple Heart. The large infection made it difficult for him to walk, and caused his foot to swell for a short time, shortening his first tour of duty.

== Etymology ==
The term first appeared in the English language in the 1870s, after the British Indian Army encountered the sticks in their border conflicts against the Kachins of northeast Burma (and it is from the Tibeto-Burman language that this word probably originated).

== See also ==
- Area denial weapon
- NLF and PAVN strategy, organization and structure
- NLF and PAVN logistics and equipment
- NLF and PAVN battle tactics

== Sources ==
- Steins, Richard (2003). Colin Powell: A Biography. Greenwood Publishing Group. ISBN 0-313-32266-X. OCLC 51118331.
