= Alan Morrison (general) =

Australian Army officer

Alan Lindsay Morrison
- Born: 15 August 1927; Sydney, Australia
- Died: 9 May 2008 (aged 80); Canberra, Australia
- Relatives: Lieutenant General David Morrison (son)
- Military career
- Allegiance: Australia
- Branch: Australian Army
- Service years: 1945–81
- Rank: Major General
- Nickname: "Alby"
- Units: 3rd Battalion, Royal Australian Regiment; 66th Battalion
- Commands: Royal Military College, Duntroon; 1st Brigade; 9th Battalion, Royal Australian Regiment
- Conflicts: Korean War; Vietnam War
- Awards: Officer of the Order of Australia; Distinguished Service Order; Member of the Order of the British Empire

Major General Alan Lindsay "Alby" Morrison, AO, DSO, MBE (15 August 1927 – 9 May 2008) was a senior officer in the Australian Army. A graduate of the Royal Military College, Duntroon, Morrison was commissioned as an infantry officer in 1947 and served on occupation duties in Japan as part of the British Commonwealth Occupation Force. He later served with the 3rd Battalion, Royal Australian Regiment, seeing combat as a platoon commander during the Korean War. After serving on the headquarters of the 28th Commonwealth Brigade, he led the 9th Battalion, Royal Australian Regiment, during its combat tour during the Vietnam War. His later appointments included commander of the 1st Brigade and commandant of Duntroon. He retired from the Army in 1981 after 36 years of service, and died in 2008 at the age of 80.

== Early life ==
Morrison was born on 15 August 1927 in Sydney, New South Wales, the second of three sons to John and Eileen Morrison. Initially from Haberfield, the family moved to Bronte and Morrison participated in body surfing at Bronte beach and played rugby union. He went to school at Waverley College and completed his education in 1944. He entered the Royal Military College, Duntroon, at the beginning of 1945, graduating as an infantry officer in December 1947.

== Army service ==
After graduating from Duntroon, Morrison was posted to Japan to join the 66th Battalion, 34th Brigade, as part of the British Commonwealth Occupation Force in 1948. The battalion was renamed the 2nd Battalion, Royal Australian Regiment, on 23 November 1948 and he returned to Australia with the unit in December 1948.

When Australia committed the 3rd Battalion, Royal Australian Regiment (3RAR), as Australia's main land force contribution to the United Nations forces in the Korean War, Morrison volunteered and was posted to the unit as a platoon commander. The battalion arrived in South Korea in late September 1950. 3 RAR was part of the 27th Commonwealth Brigade and took part in the United Nations offensive into North Korea and the subsequent withdrawal into South Korea following the Chinese offensive in the winter of 1950–51. He suffered a serious eye injury and was evacuated and hospitalised. After recovering, Morrison worked in the British Commonwealth Occupation Force headquarters in Japan and then the 28th Commonwealth Brigade's headquarters until he returned to Australia in 1953. Morrison was appointed a Member of the Order of the British Empire for his "outstanding contribution to successful integration of all units" while a part of the staff headquarters in Korea.

On returning to Australia, Morrison was posted to Cairns as adjutant to the 51st Battalion, Far North Queensland Regiment. While based in Cairns he met his future wife, Margaret; the couple married on 18 December 1954 and had a son, David, shortly afterwards. In 1956 he was an instructor at Duntroon, later his daughter Jenny was born. Morrison then became a student at the British Army Staff College, Surrey, England. He later spent two years on the military staff at Australia House in London. Returning to Australia, he became the Operations Officer of the 1st Battalion, Royal Australian Regiment and later as second-in-command before being promoted to lieutenant colonel.

Morrison was then posted as an instructor to the Australian Army Staff College for two years. He was appointed commanding officer of the 9th Battalion, Royal Australian Regiment, at Keswick Barracks in Adelaide, South Australia, on 13 November 1967 and tasked with raising the new battalion. He was the commanding officer of the battalion during its tour of duty during the Vietnam War in 1968–69, remaining with the battalion until 14 January 1970. Morrison was awarded the Distinguished Service Order for his "gallant services" as a battalion commander in Vietnam. He was posted as a Military Assistant to the Chief of the General Staff, later being promoted to colonel on the Army Headquarters staff. Morrison was promoted to brigadier in 1974, and attended the Royal College of Defence Studies, England. After completing his studies he was upon his return to Australia appointed Commander of the 1st Brigade at Holsworthy. He was later promoted to major general and posted to Duntroon as the Commandant, and later as Chief of Personnel before he retired on 10 August 1981 after 36 years service. Morrison was awarded an Officer of the Order of Australia for his services to the Australian Army.

== Later life and legacy ==
After leaving the Army, Morrison founded the RAR Association and became the inaugural Chairman. He was also active as the Services Member of the Repatriation Commission until 1989. Afterwards, he became Deputy Chairman of the Calvary Hospital Board, Canberra, until 1997. He died on 9 May 2008 and was survived by his wife and two children.

His son, Lieutenant General David Morrison, was the Chief of Army from June 2011 until his retirement in May 2015.
