= General Morrison =

General Morrison may refer to:

- Alan Morrison (general) (1927–2008), Australian Army major general
- David Morrison (Australian Army officer) (born 1956), Australian Army lieutenant general
- DeLesseps Story Morrison (1912–1964), U.S. Army Reserve major general
- Edward Morrison (Canadian Army officer) (1867–1925), Canadian Army major general
- George Morrison (British Army officer) (1703–1799), British Army general
- John B. Morrison (fl. 1980s–2020s), U.S. Army lieutenant general
- John Frank Morrison (1857–1932), U.S. Army major general
- Joseph Wanton Morrison (1783–1826), British Army brigadier general
- General Samuel Morrison, fictional character from the A-Team
