= 66th Battalion (Australia) =

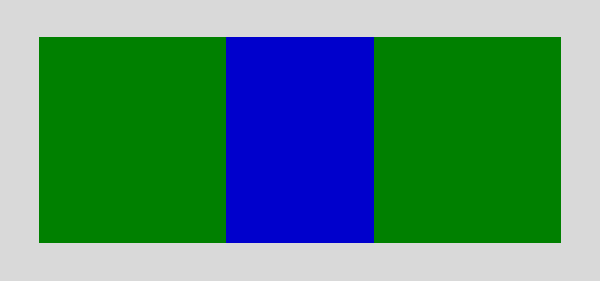
- Active: April 1917 – September 1917; October 1945 – November 1948
- Disbanded: 16th September 1917; 23th November 1948
- Country: Australia
- Branch: Australian Army
- Type: Infantry
- Role: Infantry; Peacekeeping
- Size: Battalion

The 66th Battalion was an infantry unit of the Australian Army that existed briefly during World War I and later in the aftermath of World War II. It was initially raised in 1917 as part of the Australian Imperial Force (AIF). Later, the battalion was reformed in 1945 to serve as part of the British Commonwealth Occupation Force (BCOF).

== History ==
=== World War 1 ===
The 66th Battalion was raised in England on 25 April 1917 as part of the Australian Imperial Force (AIF). The unit was assigned to the 17th Brigade in the planned 6th Division. However, on 16 September 1917, the 6th Division was disbanded, and its soldiers were broken up into reinforcements for other units in the AIF.

=== Post World War II ===
The 65th Battalion as one of the 3 infantry battalions in the 34th Brigade formed in October 1945 in the aftermath of World War II as part of the British Commonwealth Occupation Force. The battalion was made up of volunteers from the 9th Division and was formed at Labuan in British North Borneo before being moved to the base at Morotai. In January 1946, the Battalion arrived in Japan. The battalion was charged with enforcing the directives of the Supreme Commander for the Allied Powers, which involved various tasks such as ceremonial duties, escorting displaced persons, restoring law and order and overseeing the disarmament process.

In September 1948, it was announced that the battalion would be withdrawn from BCOF and would be returning home. An advance party left later that month with the withdrawal being complete by 7 December, leaving with the 65th Battalion.

On 23 November 1948, the 66th Battalion was renamed to the 2nd Battalion, The Australian Regiment. An application was made for a royal title, which was granted on 10 March 1949, making it the 2nd Battalion, Royal Australian Regiment.

== See also ==
- Royal Australian Regiment
- 1917 Conscription Referendum
