= Operation Blaze =

1952 raid during the Korean War

- Part of the Korean War
Date	2 July 1952
Location	Kangao-ri, Korea
Result	Indecisive

Belligerents
United Nations: Australia	China

Commanders and leaders
(Australia) David Thomson	(China) Unknown

Units involved
1 RAR	Unknown

Strength
One company	Unknown

Casualties and losses
4 killed 33 wounded	Unknown

Operation Blaze (2 July 1952) was a United Nations Command (UN) operation near Kangao-ri during the Korean War to capture a prisoner. The raid involved a company-sized attack from the newly arrived 1st Battalion, Royal Australian Regiment (1 RAR) on Chinese People's Volunteer Army (PVA) positions on Hill 227. Although the Australians were able to take some of the PVA positions on the hill, they did not achieve all of their objectives and were eventually forced to withdraw after running out of ammunition.

== Background ==
Australia had committed a second battalion to the fighting in Korea in 1952, with the 1st Battalion, Royal Australian Regiment (1 RAR) joining 3 RAR in the 28th British Commonwealth Brigade of the 1st Commonwealth Division in early June. Soon after the battalion was detached to the 29th British Infantry Brigade to relieve the 1st Battalion, the Leicestershire Regiment, on the Jamestown Line.

== Battle ==
A Company 1 RAR, under the command of Major David Thomson, was tasked to raid the positions of the PVA 39th Field Army on Hill 227. The raid was 1 RAR's first major action of the war and was to be carried out in broad daylight. The objectives of the raid were to take prisoners for the purpose of gathering intelligence and to overrun the garrison stationed on Hill 227.

Preceded by a bombardment from supporting artillery, the attack on Hill 227 started at 09:00. With the assaulting troops wearing American issue body armour and with flamethrower and demolition platoons attached, the company gained the top within half an hour and immediately faced heavy and accurate PVA small arms, mortar and artillery fire. Company headquarters received two direct hits from mortar fire, killing the wireless operator and wounding the artillery forward observation officer and two other members.

Only two out of six bunkers targeted for capture were subsequently occupied, and the Australians attempted to flush the PVA out into the open. However, the assaulting force was unable to dislodge the remaining PVA defenders, nor were they able to capture a prisoner. A Company remained in possession of Hill 227 stronghold for 90 minutes, before being directed to withdraw due to running out of ammunition.

== Aftermath ==
While the Australians failed to achieve all their objectives, the PVA positions atop Hill 227 were largely destroyed, and the operation provided 1 RAR with vital experience against the PVA. A Company also gained high praise for their conduct, with the operation overseen from a nearby observation post on Hill 210 by General James Van Fleet, commander of US Eighth Army; General Mark Clark, UN commander; Major General James Cassels, commander of the 1st Commonwealth Division; and Brigadier Thomas Daly, the commander 28th Brigade.

Regardless, the preceding artillery bombardment by the 25 pounders had been too light to cause damage to the bunkers on Hill 227 while the two airstrikes planned in support of the operation could not be undertaken due to poor weather. Major David Thomson and Lieutenant G.J Lucas were later awarded the Military Cross; Corporal Edward Taylor received the Military Medal and the US Silver Star was awarded to Corporal H.E Patch. Three Australians were killed and 34 wounded, one of whom died the next day.
