= 65th Battalion (Australia) =

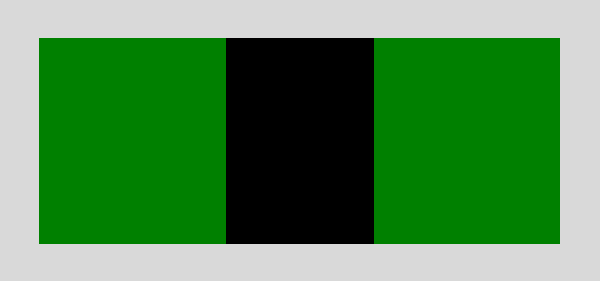
- Active: March 1917 – September 1917; October 1945 – November 1948
- Disbanded: 16th September 1917; 23 November 1948
- Country: Australia
- Branch: Australian Army
- Type: Infantry
- Role: Infantry; Peacekeeping
- Size: Battalion

The 65th Battalion was an infantry unit of the Australian Army that existed briefly during World War I and later in the aftermath of World War II. Initially raised in 1917 as part of the Australian Imperial Force (AIF). Later, the battalion was reformed in 1945 to serve as part of the British Commonwealth Occupation Force.

== History ==
=== World War I ===
The 65th Battalion was raised in England during World War I on the 19th of March 1917 as part of the Australian Imperial Force (AIF). The unit was originally assigned to the 16th Brigade in the planned 6th Division. On the 16th of May, the unit was reassigned to the 17th Brigade. However, on the 16th of September 1917, the 6th Division was disbanded and its soldiers were broken up into reinforcements for other units in the AIF.

=== Post World War II ===
The 65th Battalion as one of the 3 infantry battalions in the 34th Brigade formed in October 1945 in the aftermath of World War II as part of the British Commonwealth Occupation Force. The Battalion was made up of Volunteers from the 7th Division and was formed at Morotai. In January 1946 the Battalion arrived in Japan. The battalion was charged with enforcing the directives of the Supreme Commander for the Allied Powers, which involved various tasks such as ceremonial duties, escorting displaced persons, restoring law and order and overseeing the disarmament process

On 23 November 1948 the 65th Battalion was renamed to the 1st Battalion, Australian Regiment. An application was made for a royal title, which was granted on 10 March 1949, making it the 1st Battalion, Royal Australian Regiment.

== See also ==
- Royal Australian Regiment
- 1917 Conscription Referendum
