= 1st Battalion, Royal Australian Regiment =

Infantry battalion of the Australian Army

- Active: 12 October 1945 – present
- Branch: Australian Army
- Type: Motorised infantry
- Part of: 3rd Brigade
- Garrison/HQ: Townsville
- Nickname: Big Blue One
- Motto: Duty First
- March: Waltzing Matilda (Band)
- Mascot: Shetland Pony "Septimus"
- Engagements: Korean War: Operation Blaze; Malayan Emergency; Vietnam War: Battle of Gang Toi; Operation Crimp; Battle of Suoi Bong Trang; Battle of Coral–Balmoral; Battle of Hat Dich; Somalia; East Timor; Iraq War; War in Afghanistan: 2021 Kabul airlift
- Decorations: Unit Citation for Gallantry; Meritorious Unit Citation; Meritorious Unit Commendation (United States); Gallantry Cross Unit Citation (South Vietnam)

Commanders
- Current commander: LTCOL Ben Farrell

Insignia
- Unit colour patch

1st Battalion, Royal Australian Regiment (1 RAR) is a regular light infantry battalion of the Australian Army. 1 RAR was first formed as the 65th Australian Infantry Battalion of the 34th Brigade (Australia) on Balikpapan in 1945 and since then has been deployed on active service during the Korean War, the Malayan Emergency, the Vietnam War, Unified Task Force in Somalia, East Timor, Iraq War and Afghanistan. Additionally, the battalion has deployed on peacekeeping and other operations to a number of countries including Japan, Rifle Company Butterworth, Timor Leste, Solomon Islands, Tonga and the Philippines. 1 RAR remains one of the Australian Army's most readily deployed units sending individuals and detachments to domestic, regional and other enduring operations. The battalion is currently based in Coral Lines at Lavarack Barracks, Townsville, Queensland, where it forms part of the 3rd Brigade.

== History ==
=== Formation ===
With the conclusion of the war in the Pacific in 1945, Australia was committed to provide troops for occupation duties in Japan. This commitment led to the formation of the 34th Australian Infantry Brigade. The brigade was made up of three battalions: the 65th, 66th and 67th Australian Infantry Battalions. On 12 October 1945 the 65th Battalion, later the 1st Battalion was formed out of 7th Division at Balikpapan and quickly sailed to Morotai from where they undertook training prior to being sent to Japan as part of the British Commonwealth Occupation Force.

In line with the formative plan to raise an Interim Army, the battalions were re-designated as of the Australian Regiment in 1948 and the 65th Battalion became the 1st Battalion, Australian Regiment. On 31 March 1949 the regiment received the prefix "Royal", becoming the Royal Australian Regiment. 1 RAR was initially based at Ingleburn, but later moved to Enoggera and Holsworthy and is now based at Lavarack Barracks, Townsville.

=== Occupation of Japan ===
Under an agreement signed between the Allied nations, Australia would contribute troops towards the occupation of Japan. The Australian contribution was a brigade element, the 34th Brigade, consisting of three infantry battalions each with their own area of responsibility. By the middle of June 1946 the Australian brigade was in place, with the 65th Battalion located at Fukuyama–Onomichi, 150 kilometres (93 mi) south of Osaka. The battalion was charged with enforcing the directives of the Supreme Commander for the Allied Powers, which involved various tasks such as ceremonial duties, escorting displaced persons, restoring law and order and overseeing the disarmament process. During this time they participated in the search and destruction of wartime materials.

In April 1946 the battalion took part in the surveillance of Japanese elections. The battalion also kept a close watch on a number of repatriation centres in the area. At the end of 1948, the 1st Battalion left Japan, while all Australian troops had left Japan by 1951 with the signing of the San Francisco Treaty.

=== Korea ===
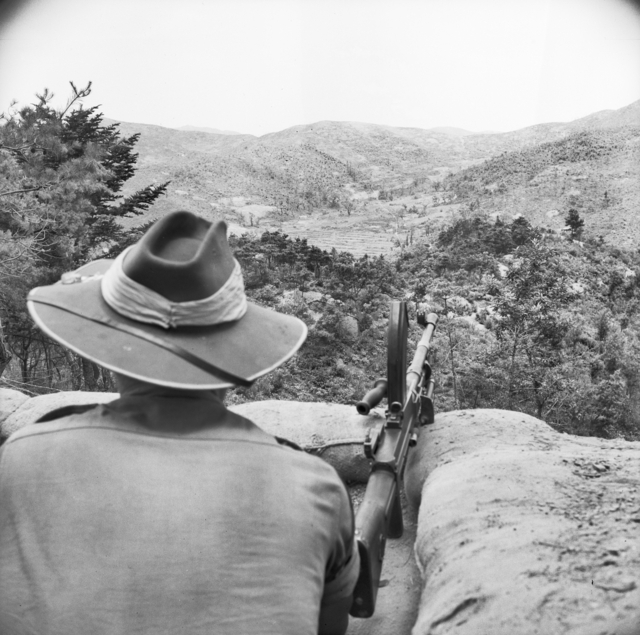
A 1 RAR soldier on guard duty in Korea during July 1952

1RAR was in Australia when the Korean War began in 1950; however, the battalion was not deployed immediately as Australia's initial commitment consisted of 3RAR. By September 1950 seven officers and two hundred and fifty other ranks trained in the battalion and moved to reinforce 3 RAR in Korea. In 1951, in anticipation of deployment to Korea, 1RAR was brought up to strength with volunteers from 2RAR and new enlistments from the 'K' Force recruiting campaign which brought a large number of men with experience from World War II into the battalion. In September 1951 the battalion received orders to move to Korea and after a farewell march through Sydney 1RAR departed for Japan on 18 March 1952 onboard HMT Devonshire. After a period of training in Japan, 1RAR arrived in South Korea on 6 April 1952, joining the 28th Brigade on 1 June. On 19 June 1952 1 RAR moved into the line taking over from the 1st Battalion, Royal Leicesters.

In July 1952 1RAR was detached to the 29th Brigade, relieving other battalions on Hills 159, 210 and 355. It took part in general patrolling along the Jamestown Line, which involved securing defences, repairing minefield fences, and undertaking reconnaissance of enemy positions to gather information on them. Other major operations that 1RAR took part in usually aimed at capturing a prisoner or destroying enemy defences. Operation Blaze was 1RAR's first major action, which involved an attack on Hill 227 in order to capture a prisoner. The attack failed in its objective and the battalion suffered four killed and 33 wounded in action.

On the night of 13–14 September the battalion captured its first prisoner as it continued to conduct patrolling operations. By the end of the month 1 RAR was relieved and whilst one company was detached to 1st Battalion, Welsh Regiment to occupy the Yong Dong hill feature the rest of the battalion was placed into the brigade reserve. This lasted until November when as part of Operation Nescala, 1RAR relieved the 1st Battalion, Royal Canadian Regiment on Hill 355. The position had been poorly maintained and over the course of the next ten days 1 RAR had to regain control of the approaches and re-establish security in the area, suffering 50 casualties in the process. At the same time, the battalion also supported the Royal Fusiliers in Operation Beat Up by launching a diversionary attack on Hill 227 on 25–26 November 1952.

On the night of 11–12 December 1952 1RAR was involved in Operation Fauna, which was only a partial success as the Australians failed to capture a prisoner, although they did manage to destroy an enemy position. The battalion suffered 22 wounded and three missing as a result of this action. Operation Fauna turned out to be 1RAR's last action of the war was they were relieved by 3RAR on 29 December 1952. On 21 March 1953, 1RAR was relieved by 2RAR at Camp Casey, near Tongduchon, and returned to Australia later that month on the MV New Australia. The battalion suffered 42 killed and 107 wounded during the nine months that they served on combat operations in Korea, however, 1RAR members also received the following decorations: two Distinguished Service Orders, two Officers of the Order of the British Empire, three Members of the Order of the British Empire, seven Military Crosses, one British Empire Medal, 21 Mentions in Despatches and three Commander-in-Chief Commendations.

In April 1954, 1RAR returned to Korea as part of the UN forces stationed in the country after the armistice, and was involved in training and border patrols. It would remain there until March 1956.

=== Malaya ===
In order to crush a pro-independence uprising led by the Malayan Communist Party, and their armed wing the Malayan National Liberation Army (MNLA), the British Commonwealth Far East Strategic Reserve was established, with Australia contributing a rotating battalion group. On 20 September 1959, the battalion embarked on MV Flaminia for Malaya. After arriving at Singapore the battalion trained at Kota Tinggi and moved to base camps at Kuala Kangsar, Sungei Siput, Lasah, Lintang and Grik where they undertook a month of acclimatisation. The battalion began Operation Bamboo on 16 November 1959 in the Thai/Malay border area in Perak, relieving the 1st Battalion, The Loyal Regiment. For the next 18 months 1RAR operated in 210 square miles (540 km^{2}) area of dense jungle searching MNLA guerrillas.

The area was largely inaccessible except by helicopter, boat or on foot. Platoon-sized patrols would be sent for three-week long search operations before returning to the base camps for ten days rest. Even though there were 117 official 'finds' during these operations, no kills were recorded by the battalion at this time MNLA communist guerrillas began to negate the Australian patrols by crossing the border into Thailand where they could not be followed. In April 1960 1RAR took part in Operation Magnet, which involved FESR units crossing the border for the first time in the conflict in an attempt to drive the MNLA back into Malaya where other units were ready to carry out ambushes upon them. Later in June, Operation Jackforce was launched, using similar tactics and during this 1RAR finally was involved in one contact.

In July 1960, the Malayan Emergency was officially declared over, although 1RAR remained on operations until the following year when it was withdrawn and began a period of intensive training as part of the FESR, including a number of brigade level exercises. On 29 October 1961, the battalion left Penang for Sydney on the MV Flaminia, having suffered two men killed in action. The battalion returned to Malaysia in early 1969, after two major exercises, 'Jumping Wallaby' and 'Sheer Hell', the unit withdrew from Malaysia, joining the Selarang garrison in Singapore in December 1969. The unit remained in Singapore until July 1971 when it returned to Lavarack Barracks in Townsville.

=== Vietnam ===
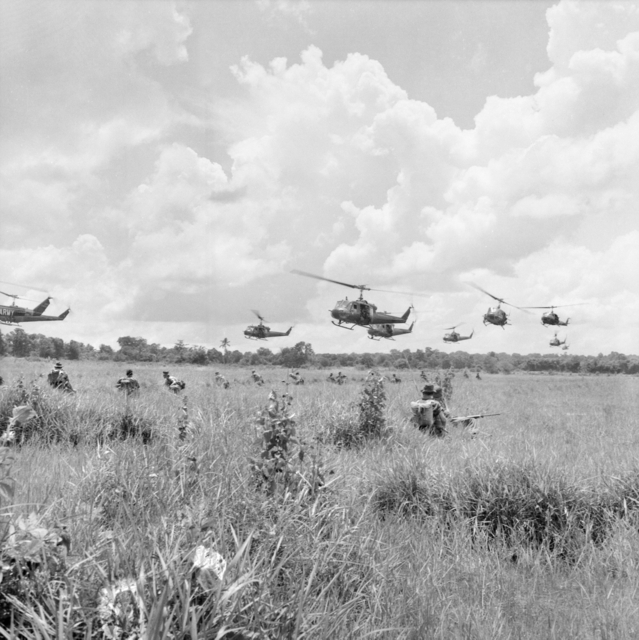
1 RAR soldiers take up defensive positions after disembarking US Army helicopters during an operation north of Saigon in July 1965

Two tours of South Vietnam were completed by 1 RAR during the Vietnam War, the first one being between March 1965 and June 1966 and the second between April 1968 and February 1969. In March 1965 advanced elements of 1 RAR deployed for Vietnam by charter aircraft, whilst the rest of the battalion followed later on HMAS Sydney. The battalion arrived at Bien Hoa Air Base in June and was placed under command of the US 173rd Airborne Brigade, becoming the first Australian unit to serve in a US formation. Initially, the Australian contingent was restricted only to providing security to the airbase, however, these limitations were later removed by the Australian government and in September 1965 began conducting offensive operations against the Viet Cong (VC) including search and destroy missions, security operations and conducting fighting patrols around the Bien Hoa area of operations.

Throughout the remainder of 1965 the battalion conducted a number of operations along with the rest of the 173rd Brigade in areas such as Ben Cat, War Zone D and the Iron Triangle. In January 1966 1 RAR took part in Operation Crimp, a search and destroy mission in the Ho Bo Woods, north of Saigon, during which the battalion conducted an air assault and uncovered the Cu Chi tunnel complex which was serving as the underground hideaway for a VC higher command element. A large stockpile of weapons and a large number of documents were found in the tunnel complex which was the deepest and most elaborate system that had been found up to that time.

1RAR continued operations until April 1966, taking part in a number of joint operations with US troops until the arrival of the 1st Australian Task Force. On Anzac Day, as the battalion was preparing to return to Australia, they were visited by Prime Minister Harold Holt. They were finally relieved in June and they returned to Australia that same month.

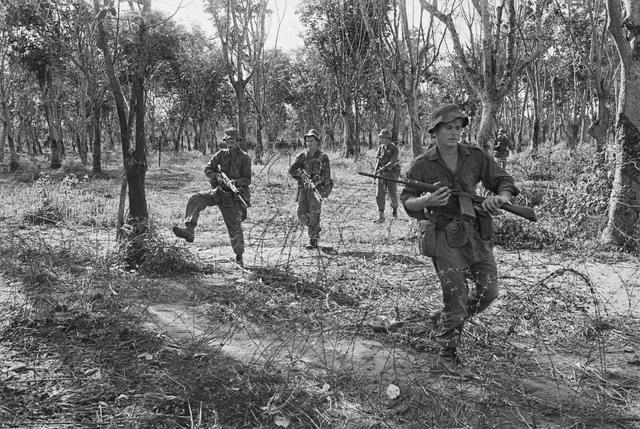
1 RAR soldiers patrolling near Fire Support Base Coral in June 1968

The battalion's second tour came two years later when it arrived at Nui Dat on 9 April 1968 to relieve 7 RAR. Operating out of Phuoc Tuy Province the battalion was mainly involved in patrols, searches, reconnaissance and security operations before being redeployed in May to an area north of Saigon where throughout April it participated in Operation Toan Thang, which was aimed at cutting off the withdrawal of VC and People's Army of Vietnam (PAVN) forces following the Tet Offensive. After conducting two small operations in Long Khanh Province, 1 RAR moved to Fire Support Base Coral. Whilst they were there, the base was attacked twice. The first attack which on the night of 15 May was only a probing attack by a battalion-sized element, whilst the second attack came on the night of 16 May 1966, when the base was attacked by a force later identified as the PAVN 141st Regiment. After fierce fighting with the help of accurate artillery fire from the 102nd Field Battery the attack was beaten off and on 6 June 1966 the fire base was closed and 1 RAR returned to Nui Dat. Later it was estimated that 162 PAVN were killed as a result of Operation Toan Thang. The Battalion was awarded the Unit Citation for Gallantry in 2018 on the 50th anniversary of the battle.

Between July and September several more operations were carried out including a follow-up mission called Operation Toan Thang II that saw the battalion move to the Bien Hoa–Long Khanh border and conduct sweeps through the Hat Dich, Tua Tich and Ba Ria areas. Between 28 September and 12 October, 1 RAR was once again sent into the Hat Dich area when they undertook Operation Windsor. This operation was later followed by a sweep mission through the north-western areas of Phuoc Tuy Province, before 1 RAR participated on Operation Goodwood, rotating on this operation with 9 RAR and 4 RAR until the battalion's tour of duty finally ended in February 1969. In between these operations the battalion continued to carry out the normal duties of an infantry battalion in Vietnam, conducting cordon and search missions, escorting convoys, patrolling and security operations.

1 RAR was officially relieved by 5 RAR on 15 February 1969 and it departed Vietnam the following day. Total 1 RAR casualties for both tours were 50 killed and 411 wounded. (Note: Note there appears to be some discrepancy with these figures, as the Royal Australian Regiment Association 1 RAR History cites figures of 54 killed and 295 wounded.) Balanced against this, the battalion was credited with having killed 404 PAVN/VC. Members of the battalion also received the following decorations: three Distinguished Service Orders, three Members of the Order of the British Empire, six Military Crosses, three Distinguished Conduct Medals, 10 Military Medals, four British Empire Medals and 21 Mentions in Despatches.

=== Rhodesia ===
In 1979, 18 personnel from the Battalion were sent to then Rhodesia (now Zimbabwe) as part of a Commonwealth Monitoring Force Rhodesia (CMFR) named Operation Agila. This force was for the protection and evacuation of Australian Nationals during the rising violence between Rhodesian armed forces and African communist guerrillas. Additionally, the multinational force was there to keep the peace before the 1980 general elections. During this period, a large part of Rhodesia was under martial law due to battles between the Rhodesian forces and the Patriotic Front's guerrilla forces. The CMFR was tasked along the lines of a UN peacekeeping force however their duties were more extensive as agreed to under the Lancaster House Agreement between the Government of Southern Rhodesia and the guerrilla forces of the Patriotic Front. Members were awarded the Rhodesia Medal on their return.

=== Somalia ===
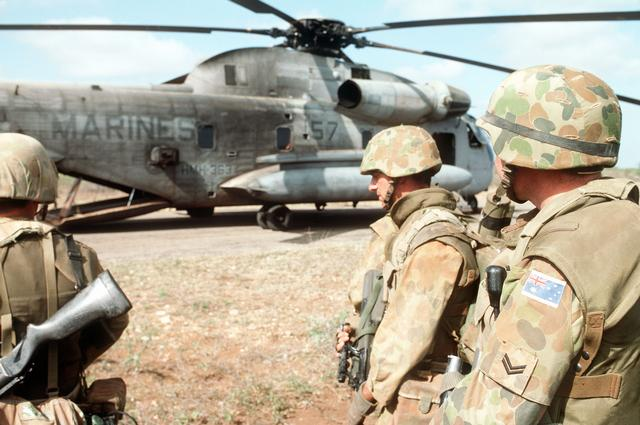
1 RAR soldiers prepare to board a United States Marine Corps helicopter in Somalia

In 1991, the sub-Saharan African nation of Somalia was gripped by a deadly civil war, which coupled with widespread famine, that threatened a humanitarian disaster on a massive scale. Initially the global response was slow, but in late 1992 the United Nations requested assistance in securing the nation as it went about the task of reconstructing the shattered nation's infrastructure and delivering humanitarian assistance. In response Australia pledged to deploy a 937-strong battalion group in Operation Solace under the auspices of the wider US-led Operation Restore Hope as part of the Unified Task Force (UNITAF) in Somalia.

1RAR, as part of the Operational Deployment Force, was chosen as the main unit upon which the Australian battalion group would be based and on 17 December 1992 was warned out for deployment. (Note: The battalion group also included armoured personnel carriers, artillery, field engineers, signals and a company-sized battalion support group. See Odgers 1994, p. 530.) Deploying onboard HMAS Tobruk, HMAS Jervis Bay and charter aircraft, the battalion group was committed for a finite period between January and May 1993, and was given responsibility for a 17,000 square kilometres (6,600 sq mi) area centred upon Baidoa, which was a provincial town in the south-western area of Somalia.

During its deployment, 1RAR took part in seven major operations and on 17 February 1993, they had the first of 11 contacts with Somali gunmen. Approximately 1,100-foot patrols were undertaken whilst the battalion group was deployed, ensuring the safe delivery of 8,311 tonnes of humanitarian relief supplies. Additionally, 935 weapons including 544 rifles and 145 machine guns were seized. Seven Somali gunmen were killed, four were wounded and 70 were detained and turned over to the Auxiliary Security Forces. On 14 May 1993, the battalion handed responsibility for the Humanitarian Relief Sector to the French element of the United Nations Force. 1RAR returned to Australia on 22 May 1993 and marched through the streets of Townsville, Queensland.

Operation Solace was the first active service deployment of Australian soldiers since the Vietnam War. Members returning to Australia were awarded the Australian Active Service Medal (AASM) and Infantry Combat Badge (ICB). The Inquiry into unit recognition for Australian Defence Force service in Somalia has recommended that the 1 RAR Battalion Group on Operation Solace be awarded the Meritorious Unit Citation. This was formally announced by Gazette on the 20th of November 2023 and DEFGRAM 587/2023 on the 7th of December that the unit, amongst others, has been awarded the MUC. A formal parade has not yet occurred.

=== Solomon Islands ===
Soldiers from 1 RAR arrive in the Solomon Islands in December 2004

During a battalion defensive exercise at High Range Training Area in 2000, elements of 1 RAR (CO Tac and C Coy) were recalled to Coral Lines to assist with evacuation operations out of the Solomon Islands. Operation Plumbob ensued but the battalion group did not leave HMAS Manoora.

On Christmas Eve 2004, following the shooting death of Australian Protective Services Officer Adam Dunning, 1 RAR was ordered to deploy the Ready Company Group (RCG), based on Battalion HQ (Tac) and 'A' Company to the Solomon Islands. This was achieved within 18 hours of being ordered to deploy. Calm was quickly restored to the Solomon Islands, and the RCG returned to Australia in late January 2005.

In April 2006, riots flared in the capital Honiara after a non-favourable Prime Minister was appointed. The headquarters from 1 RAR and 'D' Company were deployed to assist the RAMSI to control the violence. 'D' Company spent a majority of their time providing stability to the China Town region which was almost completely destroyed during the riots. Once the security situation had improved in the capital, the Task Force began sending patrols to the regional areas of the country. Some of the more remote communities had not seen an Australian patrol for almost two years.

=== East Timor ===
On 25 October 2000 a battlegroup based upon 1 RAR took over the role of the Australian Battalion of UNTAET from 6 RAR. 1 RAR assumed control over 1500 km^{2} of East Timor. The battalion's mission was to provide security to the people of East Timor so that civil infrastructure and government systems could be re-established under the guidance of the UN in order to help the East Timorese transition to an independent nation. Actions taken by the battalion resulted in one militia killed and one friendly wounded. In April 2001, 1 RAR was relieved by 4 RAR. The battalion deployed on its second tour of East Timor with UNMISET in May 2003, taking over from 5/7 RAR.

In May 2006, Australian forces returned to East Timor following a resurgence in violence and an increase in civil unrest. 'A' Company 1 RAR deployed from Townsville in mid-May on HMAS Manoora, flying into Dili by Blackhawk on 27 May. 'A' Company conducted sustained security, stability and public order operations in Dili for approximately two months. Operation Chindit saw the company conduct airmobile operations to Manatuto and Baucau to conduct further security operations, before returning to Australia in August.

In September 2006, further violence flared in Dili which resulted in the deployment of 'B' Company 1 RAR to East Timor to reinforce the efforts of the Battle Group already in country. 'B' Company took up a blocking position in the hills behind Dili, operating mostly in and around Gleno. The platoons of 'B' Company were often required to conduct Air Mobile Operations to other parts of the country. Early in 2007, a battlegroup consisting of 1 RAR's Battalion Headquarters and two rifle companies ('B' and 'C') deployed to Timor Leste (as East Timor has since become).

=== Iraq ===
In 2006, a detachment of 109 soldiers from 'B' Company, 1 RAR, were deployed on the eighth rotation of SECDET, during which they were tasked to provide protection and escort for Australian government personnel working in the Australian Embassy in Baghdad. Early in 2007, 'A' Company, 1 RAR, deployed to Iraq as part of SECDET 11 and conducted operations throughout the capital city of Baghdad. The unit was awarded the Theatre Honour Iraq 2003–11 for service in the Iraq war.

=== Afghanistan ===
'D' Company, 1 RAR, deployed to Afghanistan in 2007 as force protection for Australian and coalition forces as part of the Security Task Group assigned to the 3rd Combat Engineer Regiment led 2nd Reconstruction Task Force (RTF2). In this role, D Coy soldiers undertook vital asset protection and several long range patrols during which they encountered numerous improvised explosive devices and experienced several engagements with Taliban forces.

In 2009, 1 RAR deployed as a Battle Group to Afghanistan as the 2nd Mentoring and Reconstruction Task Force (MRTF2). MRTF-2 was engaged in reconstruction, mentoring and security operations in Uruzgan Province.

In January 2014 soldiers from 'C' Company 1RAR and B SQN 3/4 Cavalry Regiment deployed to Kandahar and Kabul as part of FPE-1, they returned July 2014.

In 2014–15, soldiers from 'A' Company 1 RAR and B Squadron 2nd Cavalry Regiment deployed to Afghanistan to provide security to mentors working with the Afghan National Army in Kabul and in Kandahar. They made up Force Protection Element - Two (FPE 2) and returned home in February 2015.

In August 2020, 'C' Company deployed to Kabul as Force Protection Element - 14 (FPE - 14), providing security to mentors and officials working with the Afghan National Army. They returned to Australia in February 2021.

In January 2021, 'Support' Company deployed to Kabul as Force Protection Element - 15 (FPE - 15), providing security to mentors and officials working with the Afghan National Army. They also assisted with the withdrawal of the Australian Embassy, as well as other ADF personnel and equipment; returning to Australia in June 2021.

In August 2021, 1 RAR's Tactical Headquarters and the Ready Combat Team (B Coy) deployed to Kabul to conduct a Non-combatant Evacuation Operation (NEO) of Australian citizens, approved foreign nationals and visa holders. 1 RAR evacuated 4168 people from Kabul to temporary safety in the United Arab Emirates. The 1 RAR Ready Battle Group then facilitated the onward processing and movement of these evacuees to Australia. The operation resulted in numerous honours, awards and commendations for members of the unit, with the Commanding Officer awarded the Distinguished Service Medal, Officers and Soldiers being awarded Australian Defence Force Commendations, and two Corporals being awarded the Jonathan Church Good Soldiering Award and the Hassett Trophy.

=== Tonga ===
On 18 November 2006, a platoon from 'A' Company was deployed to Tonga as a result of violence and a break down of law and order in the capital city, Nuku Alofa. The platoon conducted security operations in conjunction with the Tongan Defence Services for three weeks prior to returning to Australia.

=== Philippines ===
In 2017, the Australian Government commenced deploying 1 RAR training contingents after the Government of the Philippines accepted offers of Australian assistance. Operation Augury saw elements of 1 RAR join 3 CER, 4 REGT, 3rd Combat Signals Regiment and selected health specialists, as well as RAAF and RAN personnel, in the provision of Mentor Training Teams (MTT) to the Armed Forces of the Philippines. The land MTTs provided expert training in urban close combat to many veterans of the Battle of Marawi.1 RAR was tasked with leading the Joint Task Force and the commitment covered the period October 2017 to June 2018 where the mission was handed over to 8/9 RAR. From 2020, the mission transformed into an enhanced Defence Cooperation Program.

=== Ready Battalion Group deployments ===
Ready Battalion Group deployments are short notice operational taskings that occur within a specified timeframe. Although they are considered operational service, they were not determined as warlike and members of the Battalion did not deploy into country.

- Fiji

On 21 May 1987, after a military coup in Fiji, 1RAR received orders to deploy a rifle company from the Operational Deployment Force as part of Operation Morris Dance. In the end the force was not deployed on the ground, however, a large naval task force was established off the Fijian coast to intervene if necessary and 'B' Company was flown to Norfolk Island where it embarked upon HMAS Tobruk. From there elements of the company were spread across the task force to assist in the evacuation of Australian nationals and expatriates from the island before returning to Townsville on 3 June 1987, after the Australian government decided against taking more active measures to intervene.

- Bougainville Island

During the Bougainville conflict in 1988–89, the Australian Government placed 2/4 RAR on standby for a short notice deployment to the fractured isle. A significant number of soldiers from 1 RAR bolstered 2/4 RAR for the possible deployment. This deployment did not occur, however.

=== Domestic operations ===
- 1949 Australian coal strike

Soldiers from 1 RAR assisted the Commonwealth Government in breaking the coal miners strike. It was the first time the army had been used in peacetime to break such an activity.

- 2019 Townsville flood

In 2019, a monsoonal trough caused significant flooding in the Townsville area. 1 RAR was rapidly deployed to assist the local community, using their Protected Mobility Vehicles to evacuate people through flood waters, and checking for people trapped in their homes.

- COVID-19

In September 2020, A Company was deployed to Perth, Western Australia, to support the COVID-19 response in the state as part of Operation COVID-19 Assist. The company worked with WA Police and State Government. 1 RAR troops returned to Townsville in December 2020. The unit has continued to support the COVID Task Force by providing personnel in 2021 to assist at hotel quarantine for the returning Afghan NEO personnel as well as assisting with managing the QLD and NSW border from the Gold Coast to the QLD, SA, NSW border.

- 2022 eastern Australia floods

Widespread flooding on the east coast, particularly in South East Queensland and Northern New South Wales, has left large scale devastation to the region. The ADF response includes elements from 1 RAR

== Current role & composition ==
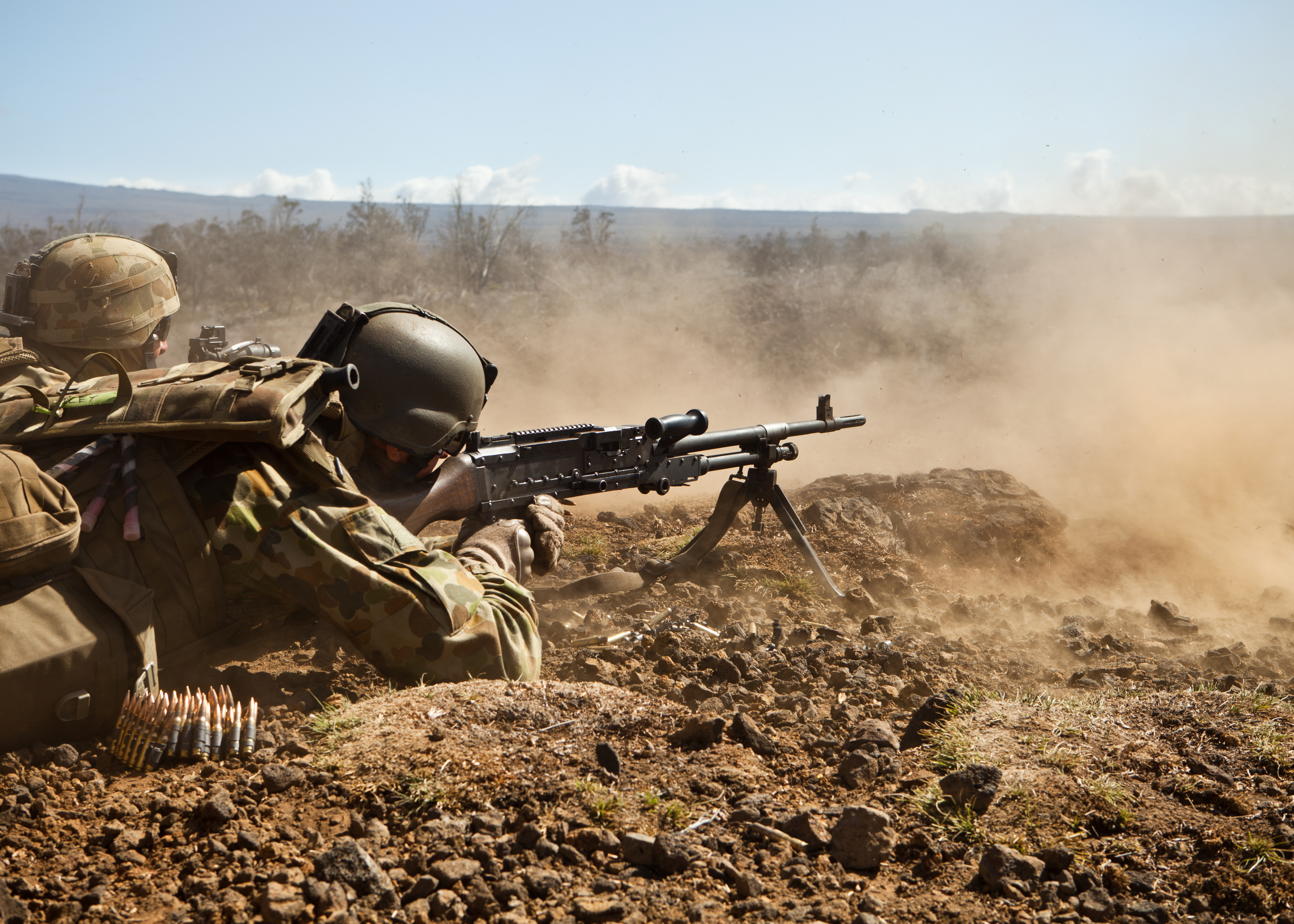
A 1 RAR machine gun team training in Hawaii during RIMPAC 2012

In 2017 the battalion commenced the transition to the motorised role with the adoption of the Bushmaster Protected Mobility Vehicle. In 2020, the battalion commenced using the Hawkei Protected Mobility Vehicle - Light, and converting a rifle company from motorised to air-mobile light company.

1 RAR currently consists of:

- Battalion Headquarters
- 3 Rifle Companies – 'A', 'B', 'C'
- D Company continues with a rehabilitation and transitions function
- Support Company
- Administration (Logistic Support) Company

1RAR also features its own battalion band, which consists of Australian Army Band Corps (AABC) Musicians providing general and ceremonial support functions.

== Battle and Theatre honours ==
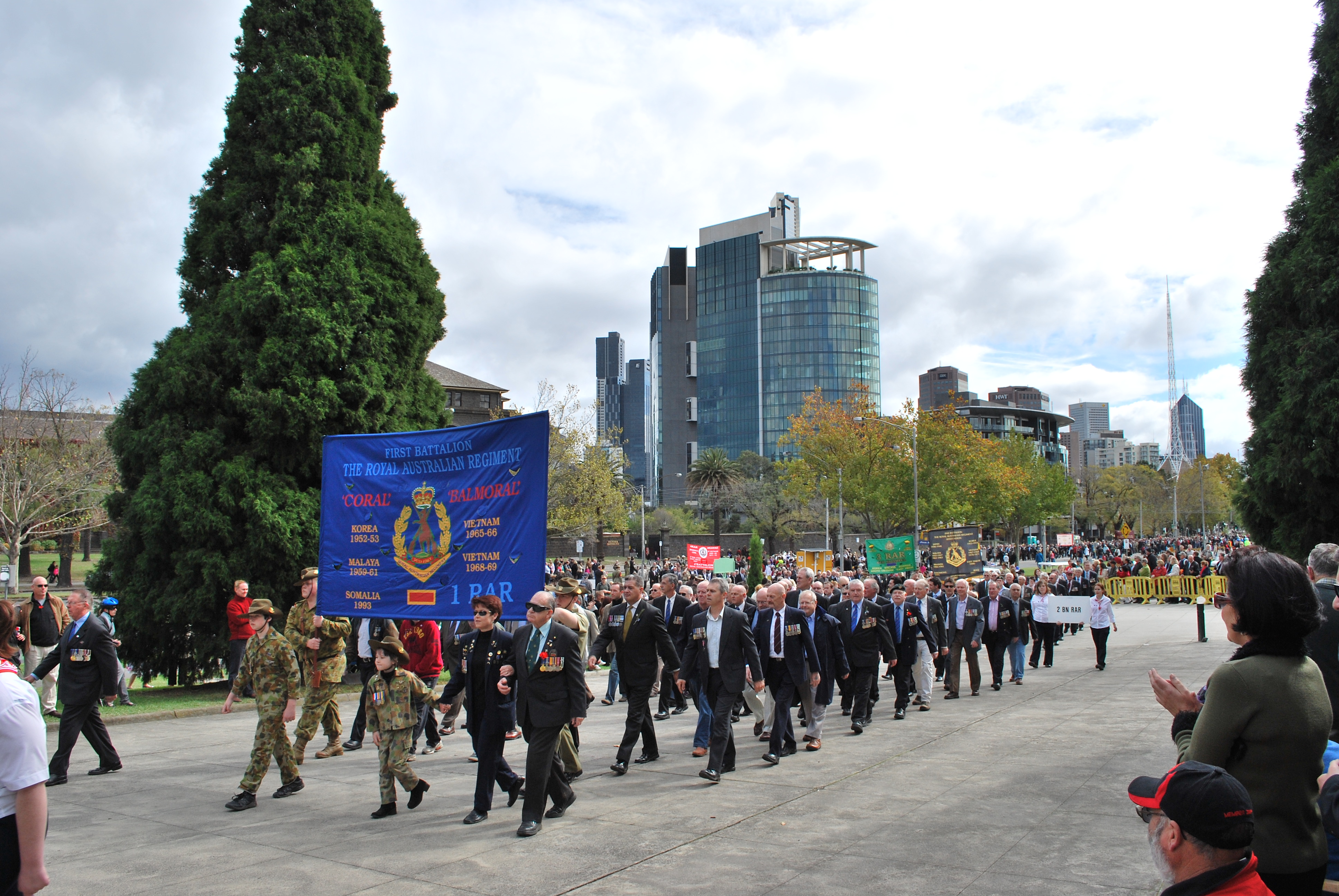
Ex-servicemen from 1 RAR during the 2009 Melbourne Anzac Day march

- Korea: Korea 1950–53.
- Malaya: Malayan Emergency 1955-63
- Vietnam: Vietnam 1965–72, Coral–Balmoral, Hat Dich, Bien Hoa.
- East Timor: East Timor 1999-2003.
- Iraq: Iraq 2003-11.

== Commanding officers ==
The following table lists the Commanding Officers of 1 RAR:

From	To	Rank	Name	Notes
22 October 1945	25 April 1948	LTCOL	R.H. Marson DSO, ED	65 Aust Inf Bn
26 April 1948	5 May 1949	MAJ	T.E. Archer ED	65 Aust Inf Bn (administering Command)
6 May 1949	3 January 1951	LTCOL	J.L.A. Kelly DSO	1AR/1 RAR
4 January 1951	1 April 1951	LTCOL	D.L.B. Goslett MC, ED	1RAR
2 April 1951	6 July 1951	LTCOL	Frank Hassett OBE	1RAR
7 July 1951	1 November 1951	LTCOL	Ian Ferguson DSO, MC	1RAR
2 November 1951	20 October 1952	LTCOL	Ian Hutchison DSO, OBE, MC, ED	1RAR
21 October 1952	1 October 1953	LTCOL	Maurice Austin DSO	1RAR
2 October 1953	24 January 1955	LTCOL	N.A.M. Nicholls	1RAR
25 January 1955	21 January 1956	LTCOL	G.B. Combes OBE	1RAR
21 January 1956	26 March 1957	LTCOL	Oliver David Jackson	1RAR
27 March 1957	4 December 1958	LTCOL	W.J. Finlayson MVO, OBE	1RAR
5 December 1958	28 June 1960	LTCOL	W.J. Morrow OBE	1RAR
28 June 1960	29 October 1961	LTCOL	Stuart Paul Weir MC	1RAR
12 November 1961	25 July 1962	COL	K.R.G. Coleman MC	1RAR
26 July 1962	15 May 1964	COL	Sandy Pearson MC	1RAR
16 May 1964	28 February 1965	COL	Donald Dunstan MBE	1RAR
1 March 1965	3 December 1965	LTCOL	I.R.W. Brumfield DSO	1RAR
3 December 1965	10 June 1966	LTCOL	A.V. Preece DSO, MVO	1RAR
11 June 1966	14 July 1967	LTCOL	K.P. Outridge	1RAR
15 July 1967	1 March 1969	LTCOL	Phillip Bennett DSO	1RAR
1 March 1969	15 July 1971	LTCOL	J.B.M. Trenerry	1RAR
16 July 1971	21 January 1973	LTCOL	I.R.J. Hodgkinson MBE	1RAR
22 January 1973	3 December 1974	LTCOL	Peter White MC	1RAR
4 December 1974	10 January 1977	LTCOL	K.A. Patterson	1RAR
10 January 1977	16 December 1978	LTCOL	I.J.C. Hearn	1RAR
17 December 1978	9 December 1980	LTCOL	P.W. Beale DSO, MC	1RAR
10 December 1980	14 January 1983	LTCOL	Barry Caligari	1RAR
15 January 1983	13 August 1984	LTCOL	Peter Cosgrove MC	1RAR
14 August 1984	14 December 1986	LTCOL	John McAloney MC	1RAR
15 December 1986	14 December 1988	LTCOL	J.P Salter MC	1RAR
15 December 1988	14 December 1991	LTCOL	J.D. Petrie AM	1RAR
15 December 1991	14 December 1993	LTCOL	David Hurley DSC	1RAR
15 December 1993	14 December 1995	LTCOL	R.J. Martin	1RAR
14 December 1995	14 December 1997	LTCOL	Mark Kelly	1RAR
14 December 1997	14 December 1999	LTCOL	M.D. Bornholt	1RAR
14 December 1999	14 December 2001	LTCOL	John Caligari	1RAR
14 December 2001	3 December 2003	LTCOL	Stuart Smith	1RAR
4 December 2003	December 2005	LTCOL	Chris Field CSC	1RAR
1 December 2005	15 October 2007	LTCOL	A.D. Gallaway	1RAR
15 October 2007	29 November 2007	MAJ	A.C. Swinsburg	1RAR (Acting Commanding Officer)
29 November 2007	12 December 2009	LTCOL	Peter Connolly	1RAR
12 December 2009	9 December 2011	LTCOL	Andrew Hocking	1RAR
9 December 2011	10 December 2014	LTCOL	Eamon Lenaghan CSC	1RAR
10 December 2014	10 December 2016	LTCOL	Jason Groat CSC DSM	1RAR
10 December 2016	14 December 2018	LTCOL	Benjamin McLennan CSC	1RAR
14 December 2018	9 December 2020	LTCOL	Christopher Jaunay	1RAR
10 December 2020	15 January 2021	MAJ	Matthew Rose	1RAR (Acting Commanding Officer)
18 January 2021	15 January 2023	LTCOL	Scott Holmes, DSM	1RAR
16 January 2023	17 December 2024	LTCOL	Brent Hughes	1RAR
18 December 2024		LTCOL	Ben Farrell	1RAR

== Alliances ==
- United Kingdom – Grenadier Guards.

== Affiliations ==
- United States - 173rd Airborne Brigade
- Papua New Guinea – 1st Battalion, Royal Pacific Islands Regiment

== Freedoms ==
1 RAR has been granted the following freedoms:

- City of Normanton, Queensland, Carpentaria Shire – 12 October 1974
- City of Charters Towers – 23 June 1977
- City of Townsville – 25 August 1996

== See also ==
- Royal Australian Regiment
- Military history of Australia

== Notes ==
Footnotes

Citations
