= Women's Auxiliary Service (Burma) =

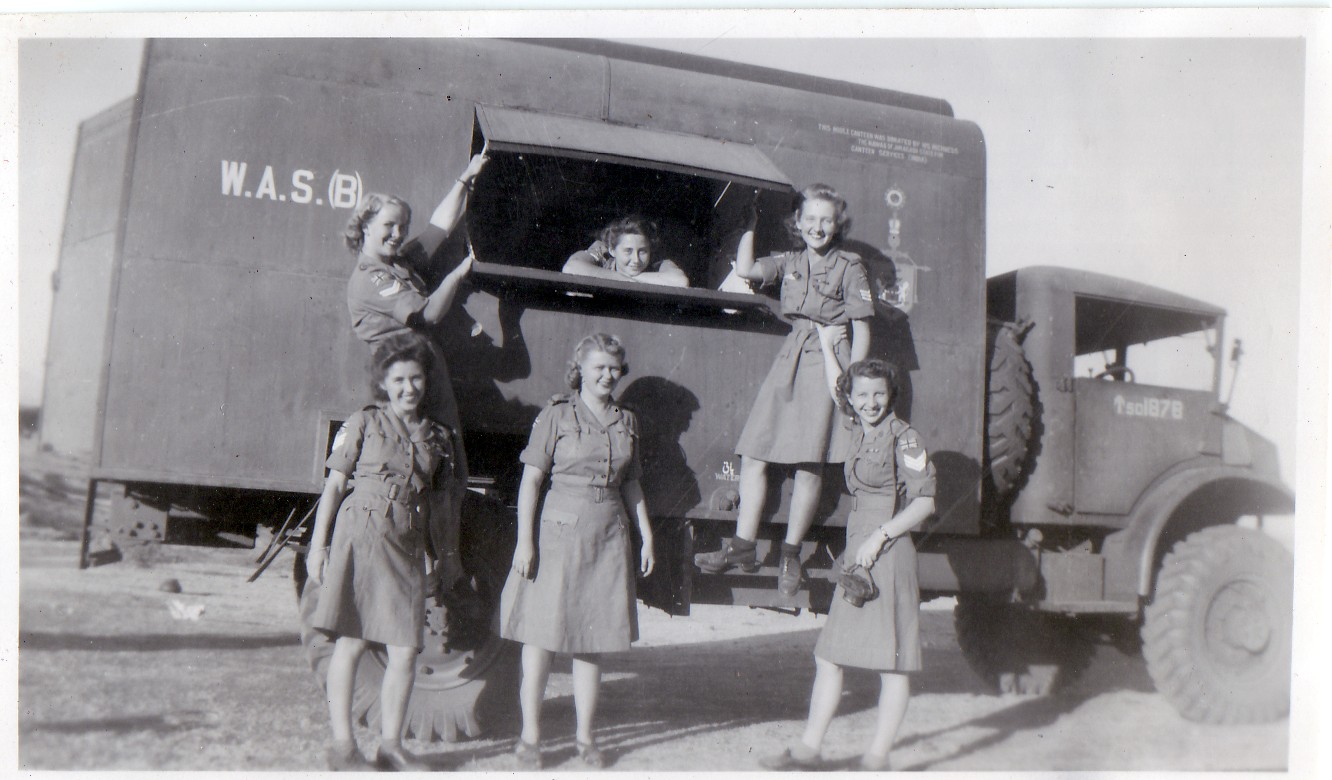
WAS(B) mobile canteen

The Women's Auxiliary Service (Burma) (WAS(B)) also known as the Chinthe Women because of the mythological creature that formed their badge. The unit was formed on 16 January 1942 and disbanded in 1946. They were a 250 strong group of British and Australian women who operated mobile canteens for the troops of Burma Command in World War II. They were founded and led by Mrs Ninian Taylor, who was granted the rank of Major and was awarded an OBE for her services.

The unit moved through Burma with the British Fourteenth Army running mobile canteens providing "char & wads", living in dangerous and uncomfortable conditions, sleeping in bombed out, rat infested houses or tents with their stores and equipment brought in by air. They improvised stoves from old ammunition boxes. They were evacuated from Myitkyina on the last plane, and from the Battle of Imphal during the siege, but returned as soon as the Japanese retreated, eventually reaching Japan with the British Commonwealth Occupation Force.

Many were mentioned in dispatches. General Slim later 1st Viscount Slim, Commander of the 14th Army known as the "Forgotten Army", said of them "They showed the highest standard of devotion and courage." Lieutenant General Sir Oliver Leese referred to them as "the biggest single factor affecting the moral of the forward troops"
