= 9th Battalion, Royal Australian Regiment =

Australian Army infantry battalion

- Active: 13 November 1967 – 31 October 1973
- Country: Australia
- Branch: Australian Army
- Type: Light infantry
- Part of: 1st Division
- Garrison/HQ: Enoggera
- Colours: Beech brown
- March: Pass Me By (Quick); Medley of My Home,Wild Colonial Boy and Skye Boat Song (Slow)
- Mascot(s): A pure bred merino ram
- Engagements: Vietnam War: Battle of Hat Dich
- Decorations: Gallantry Cross Unit Citation (South Vietnam)

Commanders
- Colonel-in-Chief: HM The Queen (Australian Infantry Corps)

Insignia
- Unit colour patch

The 9th Battalion, Royal Australian Regiment (9 RAR) was a Regular light infantry battalion of the Australian Army. The battalion was raised in November 1967 and deployed to South Vietnam as part of Australia's commitment to the Vietnam War in November 1968. 9 RAR served a year-long tour of duty based out of Nui Dat conducting operations mainly in Phuoc Tuy Province as part of the 1st Australian Task Force. The battalion returned to Australia in November 1969 and was re-formed at Enoggera, Queensland in January 1970 as part of the 6th Task Force, attached to the 1st Division. On 31 November 1973, following the withdrawal of Australian forces from South Vietnam and subsequent reduction of the Australian Army, the battalion was linked with the 8th Battalion, Royal Australian Regiment (8 RAR) to form the 8th/9th Battalion, Royal Australian Regiment (8/9 RAR).

== History ==
=== Formation ===
9 RAR was raised at Keswick Barracks in Adelaide, South Australia, on 13 November 1967. Shortly after that they moved to Woodside Barracks, where they began lead-up training in anticipation for future deployment to South Vietnam. Over the course of the next few months the battalion was slowly brought up to full strength, and by April 1968 9 RAR had received its full complement of personnel. In order to achieve this more quickly, the battalion undertook the training of its complement of 140 national servicemen instead of putting them through the normal centralised training scheme.

=== Vietnam War ===
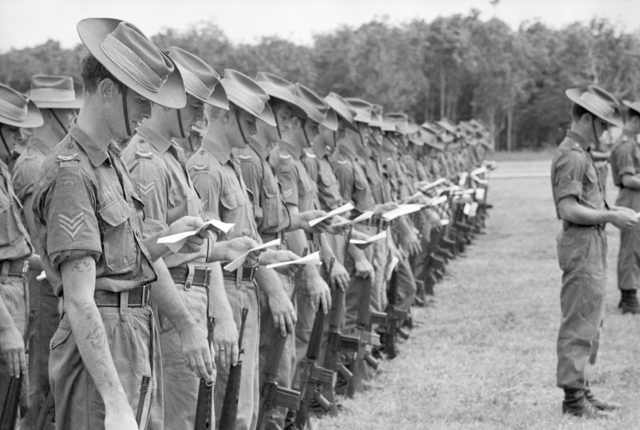
9 RAR soldiers remember comrades who died during the unit's deployment to South Vietnam at a parade held shortly ahead of their return to Australia in November 1969

After completing its training, an advance party of 150 men from the battalion arrived at the 1st Australian Task Force base at Nui Dat in Phuoc Tuy Province on 5 November 1968. The rest of 9 RAR departed Adelaide on HMAS Sydney on 9 November 1968 and while en route they celebrated the battalion's first birthday at sea, becoming the first battalion of the Royal Australian Regiment to do so. They were also the first battalion to deploy on active service without first having been presented with their colours.

Under the command of Lieutenant Colonel Albie Morrison, the main body arrived in country on 20 November 1968 and by early December, 9 RAR had commenced operations. Their first major operation, Operation Goodwood, was undertaken in Bien Hoa Province and was a response to the increasing presence of Vietcong (VC) forces in the province. Over the course of the tour, 9 RAR undertook eleven major operations that lasted roughly a month each, along with a number of other minor operations.

To a large extent these operations were focused upon pacification, which attempted to isolate the VC from the local population and to create a more secure situation in order to stabilise the South Vietnamese government. Thus the main role for 9 RAR at this time was to carry out reconnaissance-in-force and cordon-and-search missions to locate the VC base locations, clear land and to protect the civilian population. The majority of these operations were carried out in Phuoc Tuy, Long Khanh, Bien Hoa and Binh Tuy provinces.

9 RAR remained in South Vietnam until 28 November 1969 when it was relieved by 8 RAR and returned to Australia. One Distinguished Service Order, two Military Crosses, seven Military Medals and eleven Mentions in Despatches were awarded to members of 9 RAR as result of their tour to South Vietnam. Casualties included 35 killed, and another 150 wounded.

=== Amalgamation ===
The battalion returned to Australia in November 1969 and were subsequently moved to Gallipoli Barracks at Enoggera in Queensland, where they were attached to the 6th Task Force. Early in 1970, there was a change of command and Lieutenant Colonel E.R. Phillip took over the role of commanding officer. On 29 April 1971, the battalion finally received its colours at a ceremony at Enoggera presided over by the Governor-General of Australia, Sir Paul Hasluck. In August 1971, Phillip subsequently handed over to Lieutenant Colonel John Essex-Clark. The battalion was scheduled to return to South Vietnam for its second tour of duty, however, the Australian government decided to end its commitment in late 1971.

This decision, coupled with the subsequent abolition of conscription following the election of the Whitlam government and a shift in Australian defence policy towards an emphasis on the defence of mainland Australia, resulted in the need to reduce the size of the Australian Army. In order to implement these changes it was decided to amalgamate a number of infantry battalions. 9 RAR was one of these, and on 31 October 1973 the battalion was linked with 8 RAR to form 8/9 RAR at a ceremony conducted at Gallipoli Barracks, Enoggera.

== Battle honours ==
- Vietnam: Vietnam 1968–69.

== Commanding officers ==
The following officers commanded 9 RAR:

- Lieutenant Colonel A.L. Morrison DSO, MBE (13 November 1967 – 14 January 1970);
- Lieutenant Colonel E.R. Philip (15 January 1970 – 24 August 1971); and
- Lieutenant Colonel J. Essex-Clark (25 August 1971 – 30 October 1973).

== See also ==
- Military history of Australia during the Vietnam War
