= 34th Brigade (Australia) =

Infantry brigade of the Australian Army during the occupation of Japan

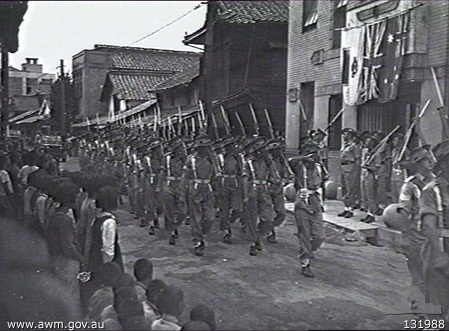
- Troops from the 34th Brigade march through Saijo in 1946
- Active: 1945–48
- Country: Australia
- Branch: Australian Army
- Type: Infantry
- Size: ~4,700 men
- Part of: BCOF

Insignia
- Unit colour patch

The Australian 34th Brigade was an Australian Army brigade. The brigade was formed in late 1945 following the end of World War II as part of the Australian contribution to the British Commonwealth Occupation Force (BCOF) in Japan. In late 1948 it was renamed the 1st Brigade.

== History ==
During the final part of World War II the Australian government became concerned that despite the nation's contributions to the Allied war effort, that these might not be recognised in the post war settlement. As a result, shortly after Japan's capitulation, the Australian prime minister, Ben Chifley made a formal offer of troops for occupation duty. The Australian contribution was to encompass naval, air and ground forces, the later of which were to form an independent brigade-sized formation. As the process of demobilising Australia's military forces had begun the day the war ended, it was necessary to raise a new force and consequently the 34th Brigade was formed on 27 October 1945 at Morotai in the Netherlands East Indies. The brigade's units were formed from personnel drawn from the 6th, 7th and 9th Divisions who volunteered for occupation duty in Japan. Upon formation the brigade was under the command of Brigadier Robert Nimmo.

After a lengthy period of training which took place while political negotiations between the Allied powers took place, the brigade finally departed for Japan in February 1946, arriving at Kure between the 21 and 23 February. With an authorised strength of 4,700 personnel, the brigade was structured around three infantry battalions—the 65th, 66th and 67th—with various supporting arms including an artillery battery, a squadron of engineers and an armoured car squadron, which had been raised from the 4th Armoured Brigade and equipped with Staghound armoured cars. The Australian contribution represented about one third of the strength of the BCOF force, while the other two-thirds were provided by India, the United Kingdom and New Zealand.

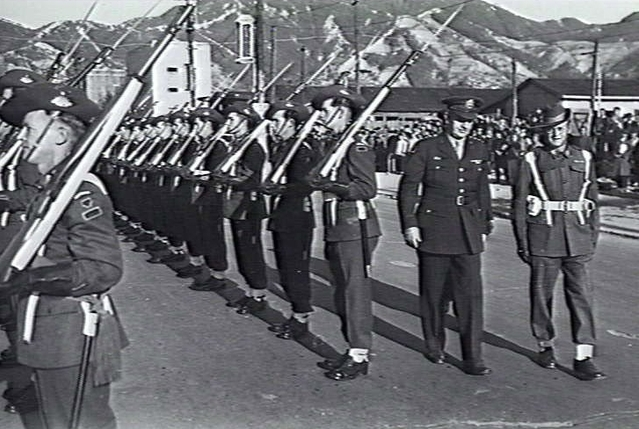
General Robert L. Eichelberger inspects the Australian Guard of Honor at Kure.

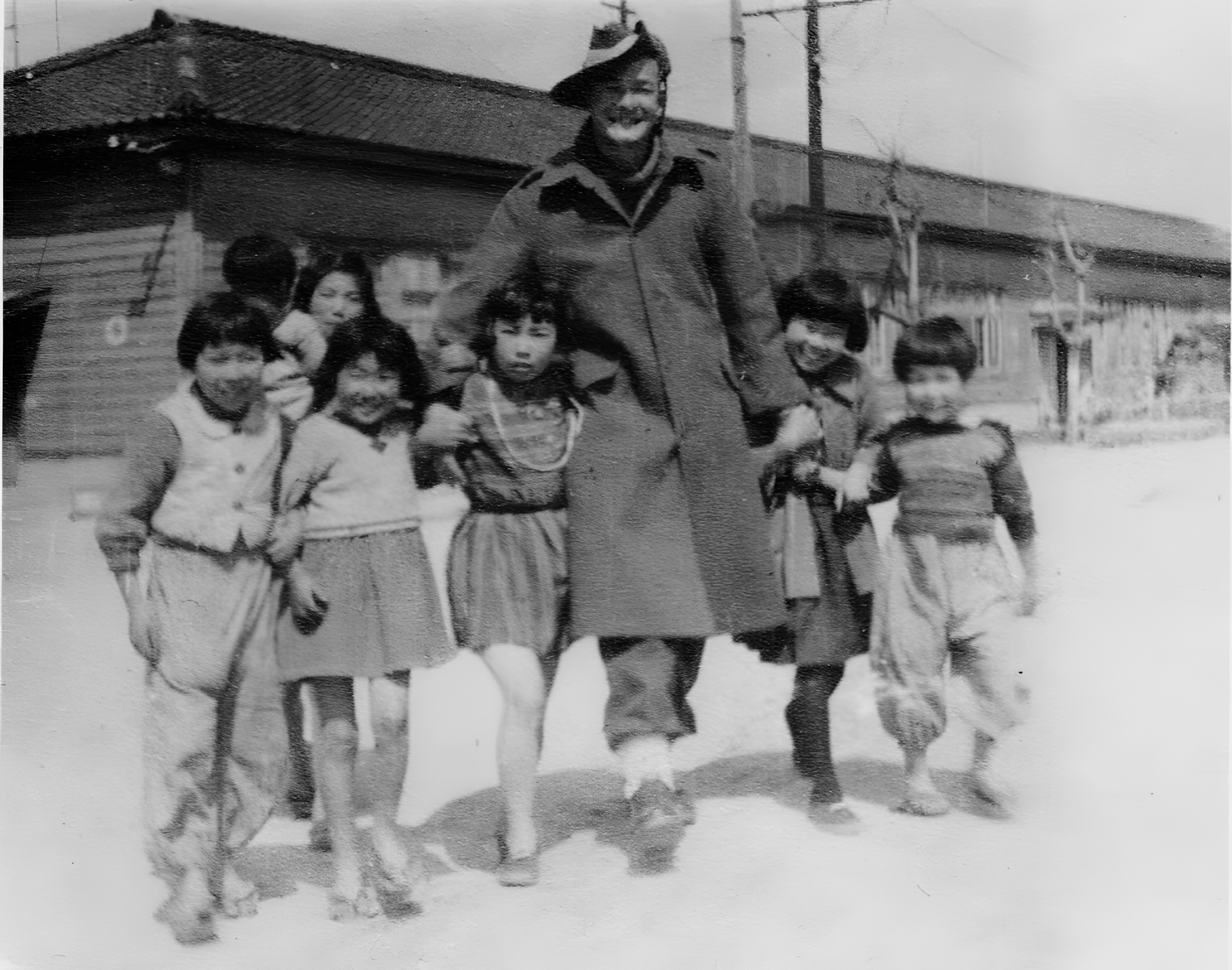
A 65th Battalion soldier poses with children in Ujina in 1947.

As part of the BCOF, the 34th Brigade was assigned responsibility for providing security and enforcing the armistice conditions in Hiroshima Prefecture. The 65th Battalion was based at Fukuyama, the 66th Battalion at Hiro and the 67th Battalion at Kaitaichi. There was no resistance to the occupation, however, the brigade's units conducted regular patrols throughout the prefecture and provided support to the occupation government. During this time, the tasks that the 34th Brigade were involved in included providing security for elections, locating and destroying war equipment and stores, and ceremonial duties, including mounting guard at the Imperial Palace in Tokyo.

The 34th Brigade's occupation also coincided with the post war Japanese government's creation of the Recreation and Amusement Association which provided organised prostitution to allied occupation troops. This resulted in a large epidemic of sexually transmitted diseases throughout occupying allied forces, with the 34th Brigade having a rate of 55% infection amongst its ranks.

As a result of the withdrawal of British and Indian forces throughout 1947, the brigade had to expand the area in which it operated at that time. By June of that year, the Australians made up the bulk of the BCOF, representing 6,250 personnel out of the total force of 6,850. In October the New Zealanders also withdrew, and shortly thereafter, as a result of the stable security situation in Japan, the Australian government decided to reduce its contribution to the Allied occupation force from a full brigade, to just one infantry battalion, as well as one fighter squadron and supporting personnel in an effort to build up the newly established Australian Regular Army.

As a result, in late December 1948 the brigade and two of the three infantry battalions (the 65th and 66th) returned to Australia. Upon its return to Australia, the 34th Brigade was redesignated the 1st Brigade.

The Australian contribution to the occupation of Japan continued, however, as the 67th Battalion (which had been re-designated the 3rd Battalion, Australian Regiment in November 1948) remained as the Australian Army's only combat unit in Japan. In early 1950, the Menzies government announced that it would finally withdraw all its forces later in the year, although the outbreak of the Korean War prevented this and ultimately 3 RAR remained in Japan until September 1950 when it was deployed to Korea, where it served as part of the 27th Commonwealth Brigade.

== Composition ==
The primary elements of the 34th Brigade were:

- Brigade Headquarters
- 1st Armoured Car Squadron
- 65th Battalion (re-designated 1 RAR in 1949)
- 66th Battalion (re-designated 2 RAR in 1949)
- 67th Battalion (re-designated 3 RAR in 1949)
- A Battery, RAA
- 28th Field Squadron, RAE
- 13th Australian Army Troops Company, RAE
- 34th Provost Company
- 20th Field Ambulance
