= David Morrison (Australian Army officer) =

Australian Army officer

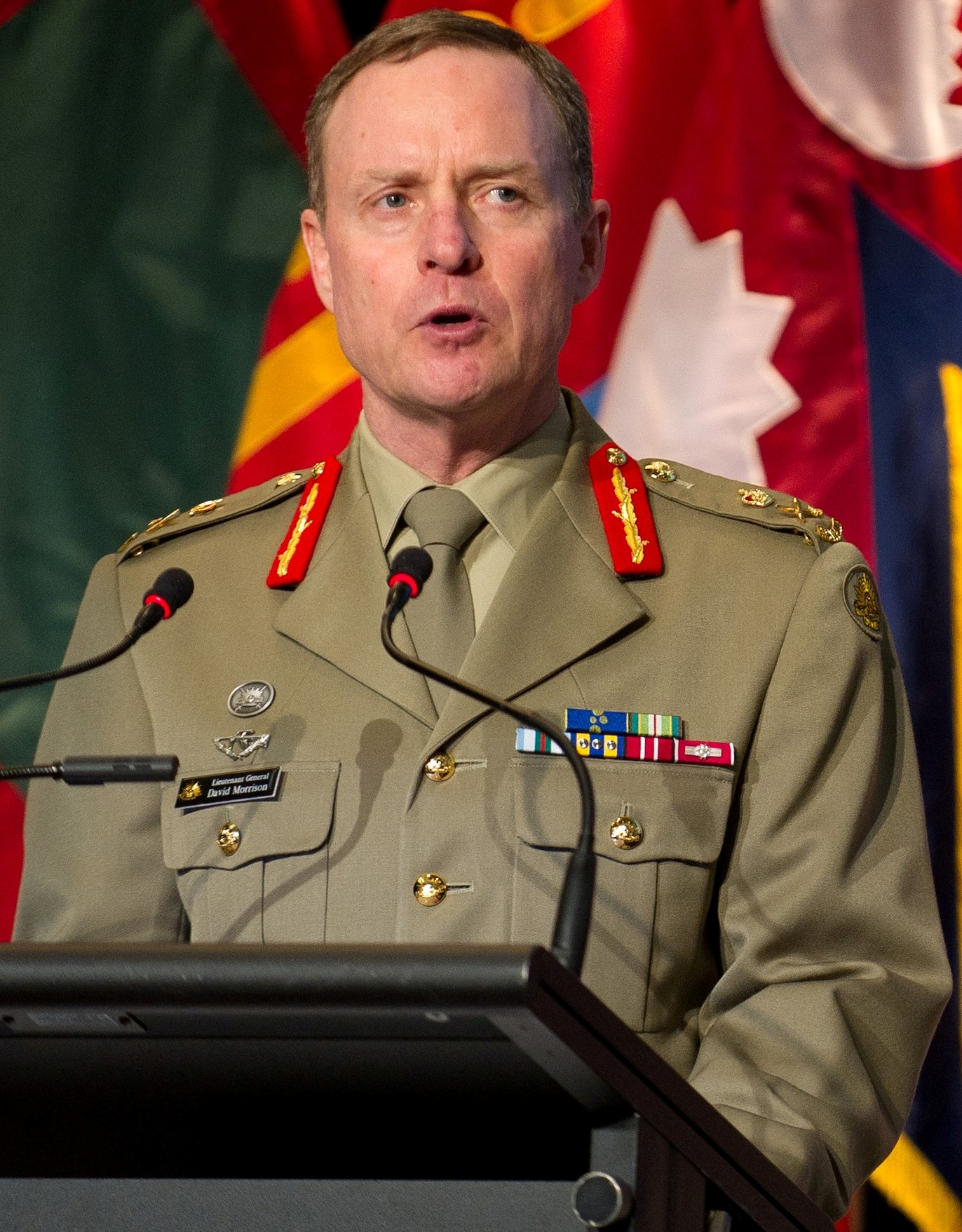
- Morrison in Canberra in July 2012
- Born: 24 May 1956 (age 70); Cairns, Queensland, Australia
- Relatives: Major General Alan Morrison (father)
- Military career
- Allegiance: Australia
- Branch: Australian Army
- Service years: 1979–2015
- Rank: Lieutenant general
- Commands: Chief of Army (2011–15); Commander Forces Command (2008–11); Deputy Chief of Army (2008); Australian Defence College (2006–07); 3rd Brigade (2002–04); 2nd Battalion, Royal Australian Regiment (1997–98)
- Conflicts: Operation Lagoon; International Force for East Timor
- Awards: Officer of the Order of Australia; Commander of the Legion of Merit (United States); Meritorious Service Medal (Singapore); Officer of the Legion of Honour (France); Australian of the Year (2016)

Lieutenant General David Lindsay Morrison AO (born 24 May 1956) is a retired senior officer of the Australian Army. He served as Chief of Army from June 2011 until his retirement in May 2015. He was named Australian of the Year for 2016.

== Early life and education ==
The son of Major General Alan "Alby" Morrison, Morrison attended St Edmund's College, Canberra, and the Australian National University, where he studied arts and law. In 1979, he graduated with a Bachelor of Arts degree and joined the Australian Army. He then graduated from the Officer Cadet School, Portsea into the Royal Australian Infantry Corps.

== Military career ==
In 1987 and 1988, Morrison served as the Australian instructor at the Royal Military Academy, Sandhurst, in the United Kingdom.

In 1992, Morrison attended the Army Command and Staff College, Queenscliff, and was then appointed as the Brigade Major of the 3rd Brigade, based in Townsville, Queensland. During that time he took part in Operation Lagoon, acting as chief of staff for a multinational force that provided security to the peace conference held in Bougainville during 1994. The following year he was promoted to lieutenant colonel.

In 1997 he was appointed commanding officer of the 2nd Battalion, Royal Australian Regiment (2 RAR), holding that position until the end of 1998, when he was posted as the Chief Instructor for the Command, Staff Operations Wing at the Army All Corps Promotion Training Centre in Canungra.

He was appointed a Member of the Order of Australia in 1999 for his services as brigade major, director of Preparedness and Mobilisation and CO of 2 RAR.

Upon promotion to colonel in October 1999, Morrison was appointed as colonel of Operations, Headquarters International Force for East Timor (INTERFET). On his return to Australia, he was posted to the Deployable Joint Force Headquarters (DJFHQ) as chief of staff. He left that position at the end of 2001 to attend the Centre for Defence and Strategic Studies, Canberra, where he graduated in 2002 with a Master of Arts in Strategic Studies.

Morrison was promoted to brigadier in November 2002, and commanded the 3rd Brigade from December 2002 until December 2004. He was then appointed as Director-General Preparedness and Plans – Army (DGPP-A) and held that position until his promotion to major general in December 2005.

He was appointed commander of the Australian Defence College in January 2006, and Head Military Strategic Commitments in April 2007.

Morrison took up the appointment of Deputy Chief of Army in February 2008, replacing Major General John Cantwell. He served in this position until December, when he was appointed Land Commander Australia (LCAUST). Following a re-structure in July 2009, the post of Land Commander Australia was re-designated as Commander Forces Command. Morrison was appointed an Officer of the Order of Australia in the Australia Day Honours List of 2010 for distinguished service to the Australian Army in the fields of training and education, military strategic commitments and force structure and capability; in particular, as Commander Australian Defence College, Head Military Strategic Commitments and Deputy Chief of Army.

Army veterans who fought a "decisive ambush against far superior forces" at Thua Tich in Vietnam in 1969 have complained that Morrison argued against their recognition in 2008, which was subsequently approved by Labor defence support secretary Dr Mike Kelly.

Morrison was promoted to lieutenant general on 23 June 2011, and assumed the post of Chief of Army in a ceremony the following day. On 4 April 2014, it was announced that Morrison's term as Chief of Army had been extended for twelve months, to June 2015.

In 2012, Morrison spoke out against defence budget cuts.

In 2013 Morrison, in supporting diversity, authorised the combining of a rainbow flag with the Rising Sun badge. In that year, Morrison also permitted defence personnel to march in the Sydney Gay and Lesbian Mardi Gras. These decisions have been criticised.

In 2013, Morrison obtained a second Master of Arts in Strategic Studies from Deakin University. He received the university's Alumni Lifetime Achievement Award in 2015.

On 25 January 2016, Morrison was made Australian of the Year in a ceremony in Canberra attended by Prime Minister Malcolm Turnbull. Morrison listed his three priorities as Australian of the year: "action on a republic, domestic violence and gender equality". Morrison's priorities were criticised.

=== Women in the military ===
In June 2013, Civilian Authorities were going to announce the mishandling of serious investigations by the ADF. As a result, Morrison ordered an investigation into several emails sent from Army accounts over a three-year period that were highly demeaning to women, which became known as the "Jedi Council scandal". At a 13 June press conference, Morrison announced that he had suspended three members of the Army, ordered action to consider the suspension of five others, and suggested as many as nine more could face disciplinary action. He described the emails as "explicit, derogatory, demeaning and repugnant", and suggested that the alleged conduct was even worse than the "Skype scandal" of 2011. In a video posted on the Army's official YouTube channel, a visibly irate Morrison described the alleged behaviour as a "direct contravention" of the Army's values. He added that he had been committed ever since becoming Chief of Army to making the Army an inclusive force. "If that does not suit you," he said, "then get out!" He also told anyone not willing to work with women and accept them as equals, "There is no place for you amongst this band of brothers and sisters."

Morrison's speech was written by his speech writer, Lieutenant Colonel Cate McGregor, who is transgender. Morrison, as one of her strongest supporters, refused to accept her resignation from his office when she came out. Seven months after his speech, Morrison attributed "one of the most quoted phrases" in his anti-misogyny speech, "the standard you walk past is the standard you accept", to General David Hurley.

Morrison's aggressive response was widely hailed by Australian and American media, in particular comparing it to the relatively guarded response of the U.S. military to similar accusations.

In June 2014 Morrison formed part of the Australian delegation to the Global Summit To End Sexual Violence in Conflict in London, to which he delivered a speech arguing that armies that separate themselves from civil society, value men over women and celebrate violence "do nothing to distinguish the soldier from the brute".

==== Controversy ====
Since the "Jedi Council scandal", information was received by media outlets, that the army, under the control of Morrison, had previously investigated the individuals involved and had failed to find any evidence of the allegations and cleared those involved of any wrongdoing. However, Morrison recommended that the commanding officer be dismissed.

Contrasts have been drawn regarding the differing responses to allegations of sexual misconduct by subordinates, in case of a lieutenant colonel, in the case of Governor-General Peter Hollingworth, and Morrison.

In February 2016, Senator Jacqui Lambie made a speech in the Senate in relation to cases involving former soldiers who claim to have suffered abuse, calling for an inquiry into coverups and Morrison's involvement. The Prime Minister has also agreed to support a general mediation process for those involved.

== Post military career ==
In May 2015 Morrison retired from the army and in September 2015 was appointed chairman of Diversity Council Australia, a not-for-profit workplace diversity advisor to business in Australia, and as a gender diversity adviser to Deloitte Partners. He is also a motivational speaker.

As an advocate for gender diversity, Morrison campaigned against the use of gender-neutral terms such as "guys". In response, Foreign Minister Julie Bishop said the use of generic words such as 'guys' should not cause offence.

Morrison participated in a "Walk a Mile in their Shoes" event demonstrating against family violence. In September 2016 Morrison equated the legacy of domestic violence victims with fallen servicemen and women, proposing an Anzac Day-like memorial for women who have been killed by their partners. The ABC Fact Check has determined that men, women and children can be both victims and perpetrators of domestic violence. Morrison says, "it's not about the statistics... we are all, as a society, the victim."

He is also a public speaker.

== Honours and awards ==

Officer of the Order of Australia (AO)	26 January 2010
Member of the Order of Australia (AM)	26 January 1999
Australian Active Service Medal	
International Force East Timor Medal	
Defence Force Service Medal with 4 Clasps	(35–39 years of service)
Australian Defence Medal	
Commander of the Legion of Merit (United States)	February 2012
Meritorious Service Medal (Singapore)	19 September 2013
Officer of the Legion of Honour (France)	July 2014
Australian of the Year	January 2016

Military offices
Preceded by Lieutenant General Ken Gillespie	Chief of Army; 2011–2015	Succeeded by Lieutenant General Angus Campbell
Preceded by Himself as Land Commander Australia	Commander Forces Command; 2009–2011	Succeeded by Major General Jeffrey Sengelman
Preceded by Major General Mark Kelly	Land Commander Australia; 2008–2009	Succeeded by Himself as Commander Forces Command
Preceded by Major General John Cantwell	Deputy Chief of Army; 2008	Succeeded by Major General Paul Symon
Preceded by Rear Admiral Mark Bonser	Commander Australian Defence College; 2006–2007	Succeeded by Brigadier Brian Dawson (acting)
Awards and achievements
Preceded by Rosie Batty	Australian of the Year; 2016	Succeeded by Alan Mackay-Sim
