= British Commonwealth Occupation Force =

British Commonwealth taskforce in occupied Japan, 1946–1952

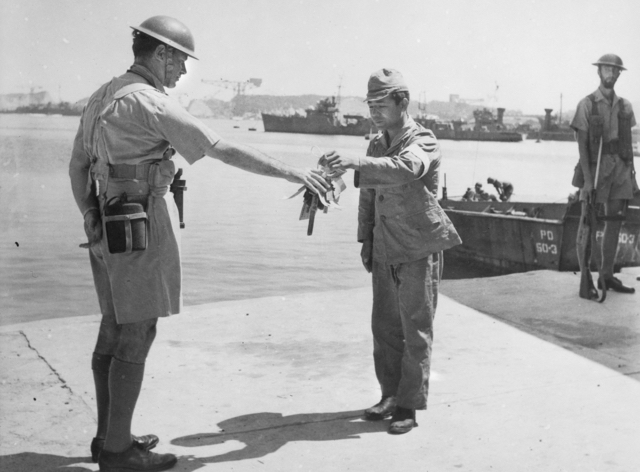
- Commander Yuzo Tanno hands over the keys of the Yokosuka Naval Base to Captain H. J. Buchanan, Royal Australian Navy on 30 August 1945.
- Active: 21 February 1946 – 28 April 1952
- Countries: Australia; United Kingdom; British India (until 1947); New Zealand
- Allegiance: British Commonwealth
- Role: Occupation, demilitarisation and disposal of Japan's war industries Operate staging posts for Korean War
- Size: 40,000 personnel
- Headquarters: Kure, Hiroshima, Japan

Commanders
- Commander-in-Chief, BCOF: Lieutenant General John Northcott (1946); Lieutenant General Sir Horace Robertson (1946–51); Lieutenant General William Bridgeford (1951–52)

The British Commonwealth Occupation Force (BCOF) was the British Commonwealth taskforce consisting of Australian, British, Indian, and New Zealander military forces in occupied Japan, from 1946 until the end of occupation in 1952.

At its peak, the BCOF committed about 40,000 personnel, making up 25% of the combined American–British occupation force.

== History ==
=== Background ===
Following the dropping of the atomic bombs and the entry of the Soviet Union into the war against Japan, the Japanese Empire surrendered to the Allies on 15 August 1945, with their government accepting the Potsdam Declaration. The formal surrender was signed on 2 September in Tokyo Bay. Unlike in the occupation of Germany, the Soviet Union had little to no influence over the occupation of Japan, leaving the Americans, British, and Commonwealth Forces responsible for occupation duties.

Whilst United States Forces Japan was responsible for military government, BCOF was responsible for supervising demilitarisation and the disposal of Japan's war industries. The BCOF was also responsible for the occupation of the western prefectures of Shimane, Yamaguchi, Tottori, Okayama, Hiroshima, and Shikoku Island. BCOF headquarters was at Kure, a naval port near Hiroshima. At the height of its involvement, the British Commonwealth Occupation Force was responsible for 20 million Japanese citizens in an area of around 57,000 km^{2}.

=== Occupation ===
The participation of BCOF in the Allied occupation of Japan was announced on 31 January 1946, but had been planned since the end of the war. On 21 February 1946, the initial contingent arrived at the former Imperial Japanese Navy base at Kure, near the devastated city of Hiroshima, which became the main base for Australian and British warships. A Royal Navy shore party took control of the port and facilities and these were commissioned as HMS Commonwealth on 3 June 1946.

For most of the occupation period, Australia contributed the majority of the BCOF's personnel. The initial BCOF presence included the Australian 34th Brigade; the 9th Brigade, 2nd New Zealand Expeditionary Force (J Force); and the British Indian Division (BRINDIV) (later known as BRINJAP), a composite British and Indian division made up of the British 5th Infantry Brigade Group (from 2nd Infantry Division in India), and the 268th Indian Infantry Brigade. BCOF was supported by the Women's Auxiliary Service (Burma) (which derived its name from its formation during the Second World War, to provide amenities to Commonwealth forces in the Burmese campaign).

The British Pacific Fleet initially provided most of the naval forces, with it consisting of primarily British ships alongside contingents of Commonwealth and US ships. The air component, known as the British Commonwealth Air Forces (BCAIR), initially comprised the Royal Australian Air Force's No. 81 Fighter Wing, four Spitfire squadrons (including No. 11 and No. 17 of the Royal Air Force and No. 4 of the Indian Air Force), and No. 14 Squadron of the Royal New Zealand Air Force.

During 1947, the BCOF began to wind down its presence in Japan. By 1948, BCOF was solely staffed by Australian military personnel, with all British, Indian, and New Zealand troops withdrawn from the occupation. From 1950 onwards, however, BCOF bases provided staging posts for Commonwealth forces deployed to the Korean War. The BCOF was effectively wound-up in 1951, as control of Commonwealth forces in Japan was transferred to British Commonwealth Forces Korea.

== Organisation ==
The major units that composed the force were:

- British Indian Division
  - 34th Australian Infantry Brigade
    - 65th Battalion
    - 66th Battalion
    - 67th Battalion
    - 'A' Battery, Royal Australian Artillery
    - 1st Armoured Car Squadron
  - 9th New Zealand Infantry Brigade (J Force)
    - 22nd Battalion
    - 27th Battalion
    - 2nd Divisional Cavalry Regiment
  - 5th British Infantry Brigade (renumbered, 25th Independent Infantry Brigade)
    - 1st Battalion, Queen's Own Cameron Highlanders
    - 2nd Battalion, Dorsetshire Regiment
    - 2nd Battalion, Royal Welch Fusiliers
  - 268th Indian Infantry Brigade
    - 5th Battalion, 1st Punjab Regiment
    - 2nd Battalion, 5th Royal Gurkha Rifles
    - 1st Battalion, 5th Mahratta Light Infantry
- British Commonwealth Air Forces:
  - No. 81 Wing RAAF
    - No. 76 Squadron RAAF
    - No. 77 Squadron RAAF
    - No. 82 Squadron RAAF
  - No. 11 Squadron RAF
  - No. 17 Squadron RAF
  - No. 4 Squadron IAF
  - No. 14 Squadron RNZAF

== Commanders ==
The position of Commander-in-Chief, BCOF was always filled by an Australian, and included:

- Lieutenant General John Northcott (February to June 1946);
- Lieutenant General Sir Horace Robertson (June 1946 to November 1951); and
- Lieutenant General William Bridgeford (November 1951 to April 1952)

The largest formation in BCOF, BRINDIV, was commanded by Major General David Cowan, from 1945 to 1947.

== Gallery ==
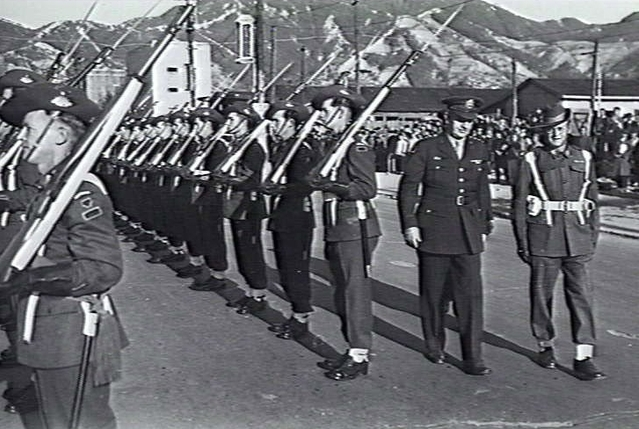
General Robert L. Eichelberger and inspects Australian Guard of Honour at Kure.

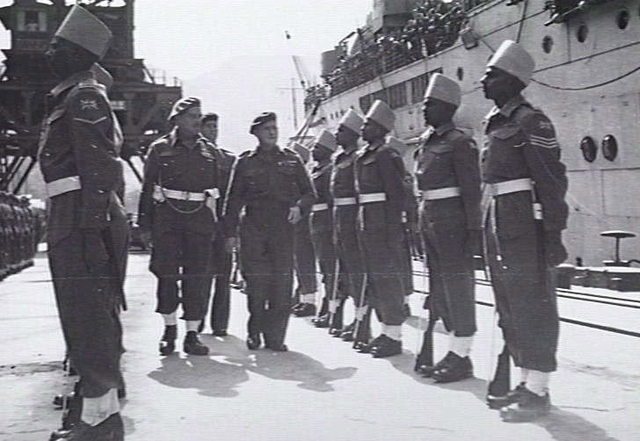
Major General David Cowan, General Officer Commanding BRINDIV, inspects Indian troops at Kure, 30 March 1946.

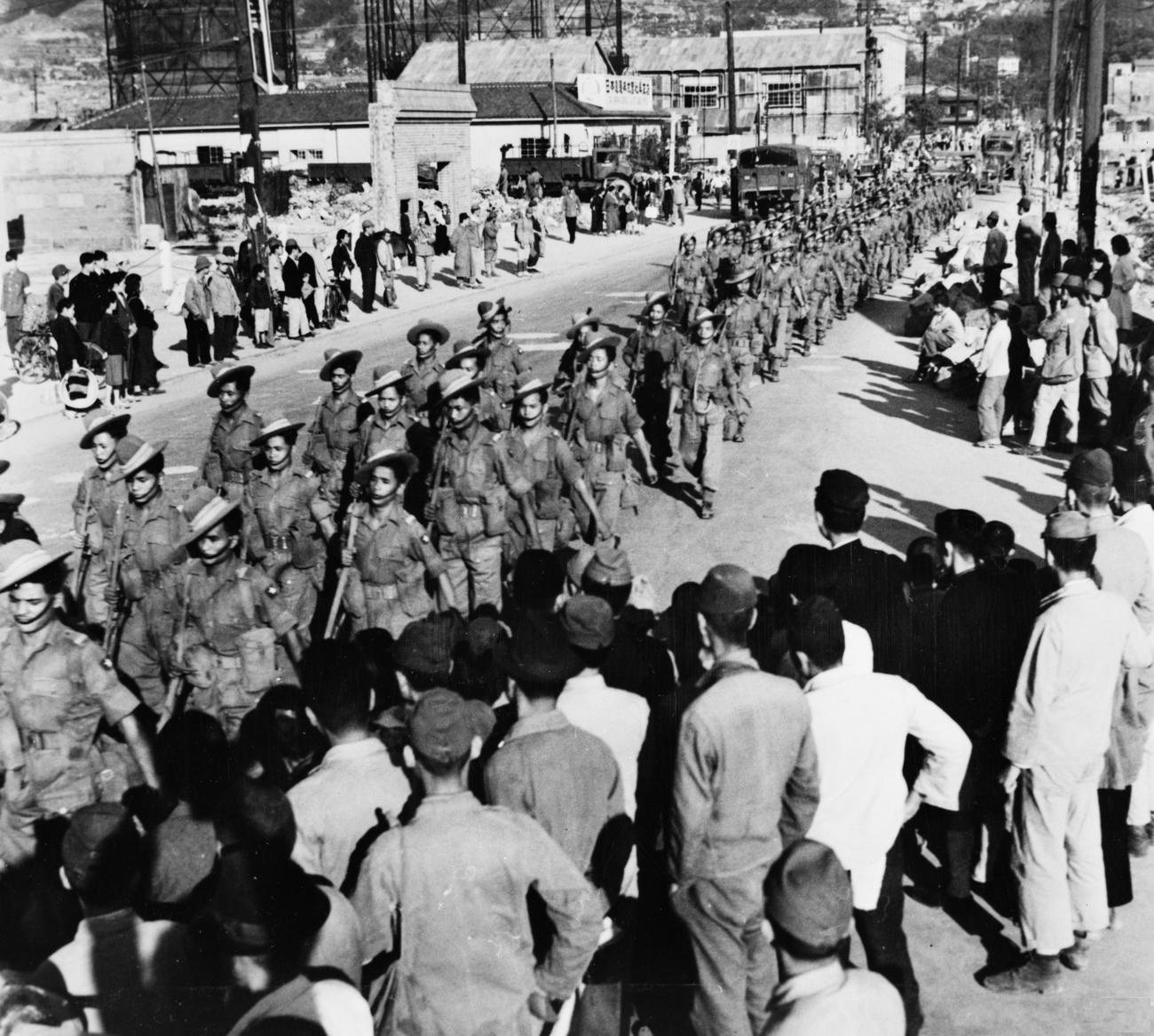
The 2nd Battalion, 5th Gurkha Rifles marches through Kure, May 1946.

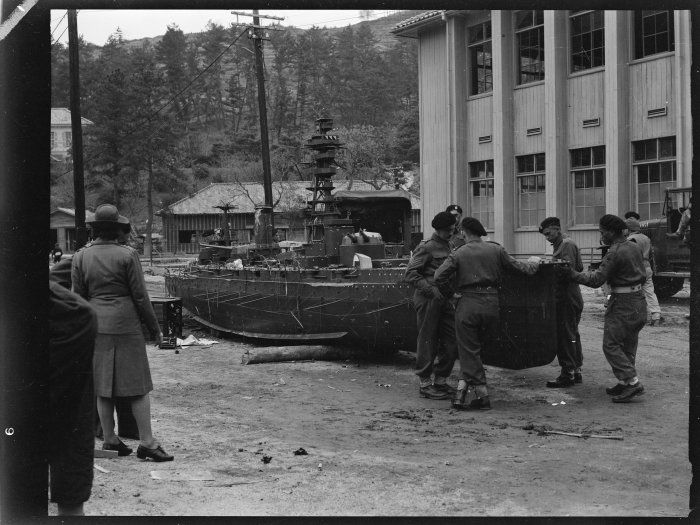
New Zealand Divisional Cavalry soldiers inspecting a model of a Japanese battleship on Etajima, 1946.

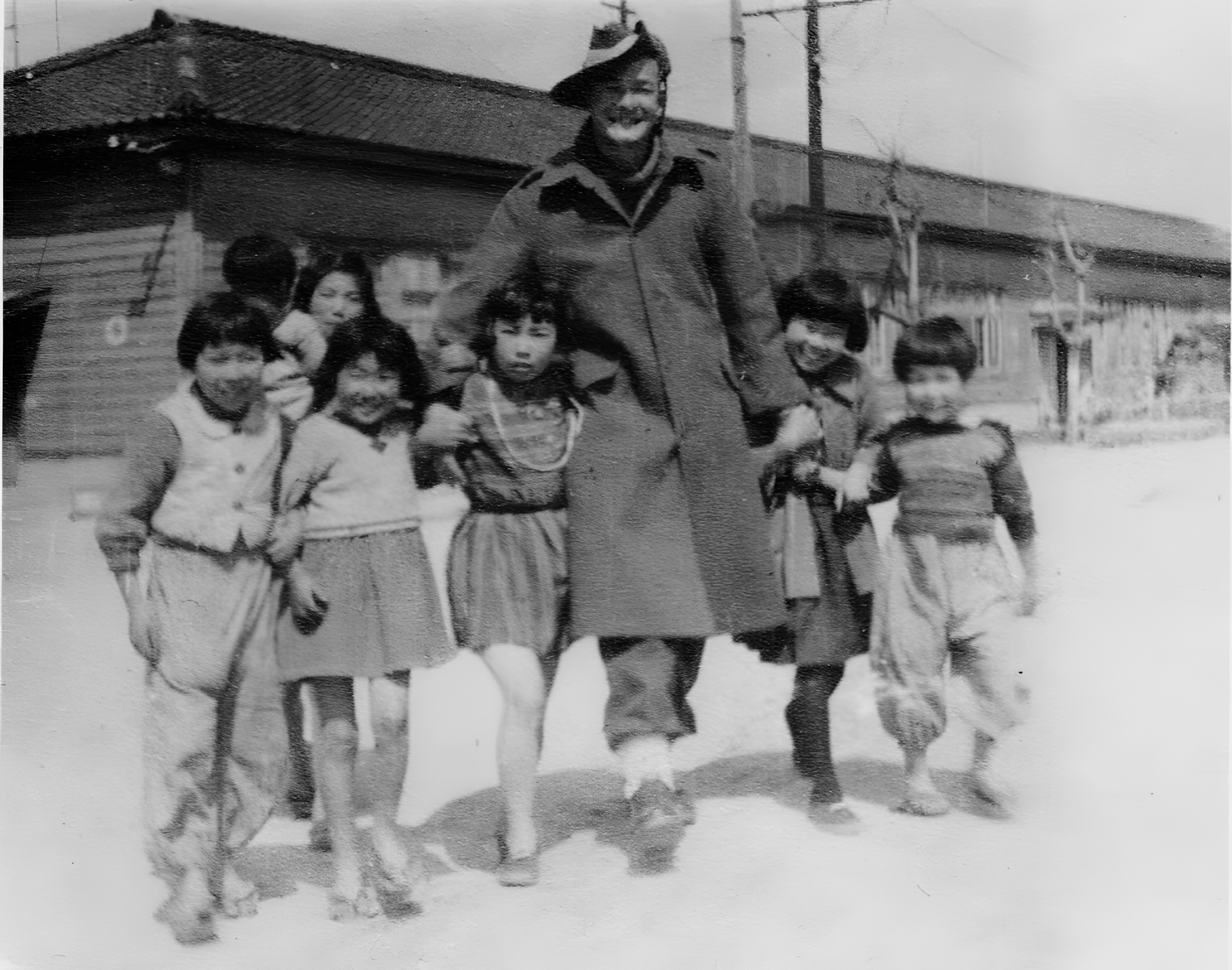
An Australian soldier with Japanese children in Hiroshima, 1947.

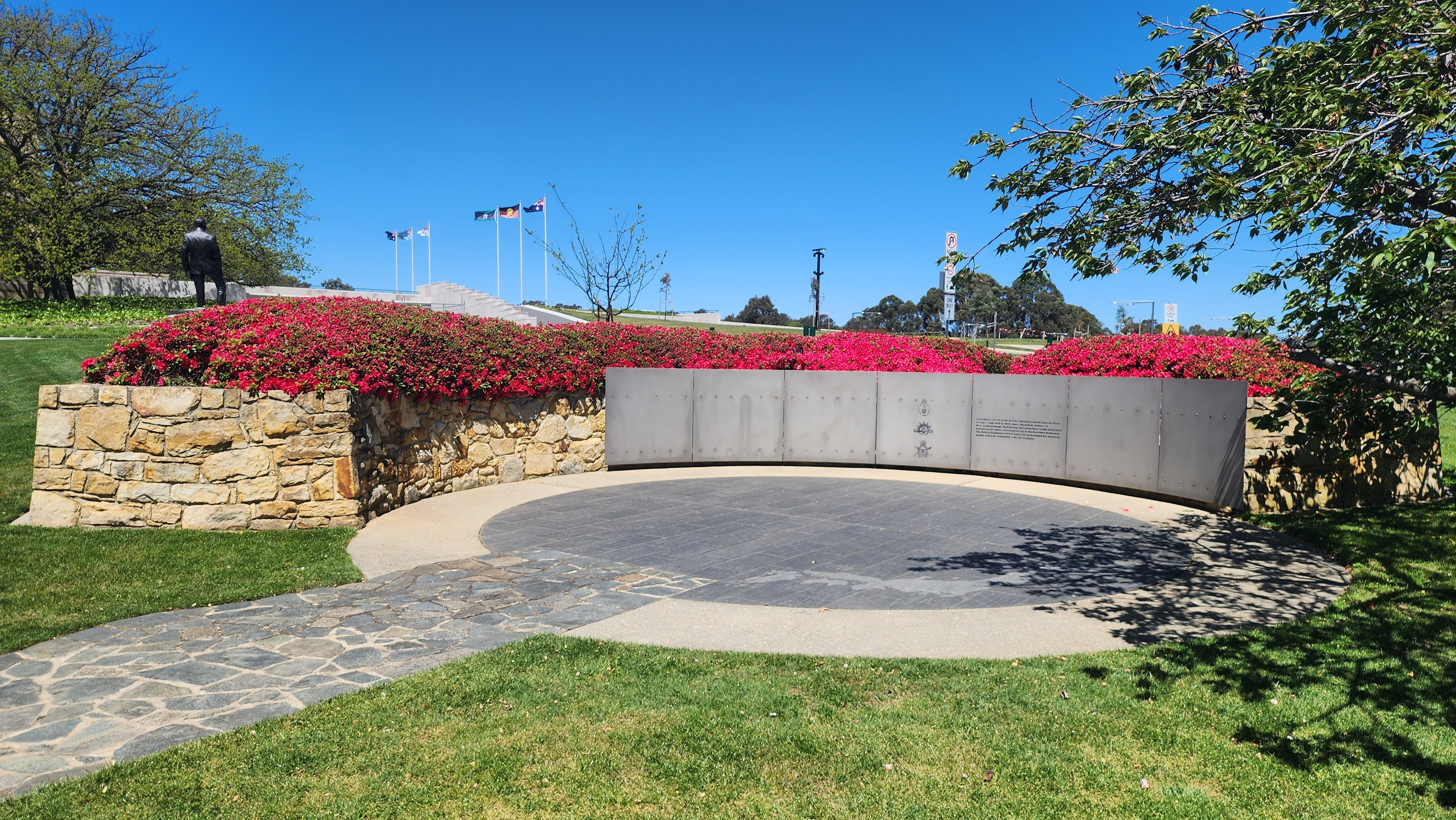
British Commonwealth Occupation Force Memorial in the Australian War Memorial, Canberra
