= CSCS =

CSCS may refer to:

== Organisations ==
- Centro Svizzero di Calcolo Scientifico, the Swiss National Supercomputing Centre
- Chhattisgarh State Cricket Sangh, India
- Colorado Springs Christian Schools, Colorado, US
- Coral Springs Charter School, Florida, US

== Other uses ==
- c^{s}c^{s}, an allele pattern in cats that results in blue eye pigmentation
- Certified Strength and Conditioning Specialist, a professional certification for strength and conditioning coaches
- Construction Skills Certification Scheme, United Kingdom recognized professional designation
- Cross-Strait CEO Summit, a business summit between Mainland China and Taiwan

== See also ==
- CSC (disambiguation)
