= CSC =

CSC, Csc or CSc may refer to:

== Awards ==
- Conspicuous Service Cross (disambiguation)
  - Conspicuous Service Cross (Australia)
  - Conspicuous Service Cross (New York)
  - Conspicuous Service Cross (United Kingdom)

== Science and industry ==
- Cancer stem cell
- Candidate of Sciences (C.Sc.), a post-graduate scientific degree in many former Eastern Bloc countries
- Card security code, a printed security code on payment cards such as credit and debit cards
- Central serous chorioretinopathy, an eye disease
- Common Services Centers, an element of the Indian Government's Common Services Centers scheme
- Common Short Code, a four or five-digit number assigned to a specific content or mobile service provider
- Compact system camera, also known as mirrorless interchangeable-lens camera
- Cosecant, a trigonometric function
- CSC BioBox, an EMBnet server in biology
- CSC-Plate, and International Convention for Safe Containers (1972) compliance plate
- Csc, the rare cold-summer subtype of the Mediterranean climate, under Köppen climate classification scheme

== Organizations ==
=== Companies ===
- Charles Schwab Corporation, an American multinational financial services company
- China Changjiang National Shipping (Group) Corporation, part of the Chinese Sinotrans&CSC shipping group
- China Steel Corporation, a steel maker in Taiwan
- Commercial Solvents Corporation, an American chemical and biotechnology company
- Common Service Centres, an Indian company
- Contemporary Services Corporation, a security organization for sporting events
- Corporation Service Company, a registered agent service company
- Country Style Cooking, a Chinese restaurant chain (NYSE: CCSC)
- China Securities Company, now known as CSC Financial
- CSC, formerly Computer Sciences Corporation, a multinational corporation providing IT services
- CSC – IT Center for Science, a Finnish information technology company
- CSC Media Group, a UK-based satellite television channel provider
- Intu, formerly Capital Shopping Centres, a British property company

=== Schools ===
- Castleton University, formerly Castleton State College
- Chadron State College
- Cornway College, a private, co-educational, day and boarding school in Zimbabwe
- Colac Secondary College, a high school in Colac, Australia
- Culver-Stockton College

=== Sports organizations ===
- Campionato Sammarinese di Calcio, football league in San Marino
- Český Svaz Cyklistiky, the native name for the Czech Cycling Federation
- College Sports Communicators, a trade organization for college/university sports information professionals in the U.S. and Canada
- Congo Super Cup, football tournament (Super Coupe du Congo (Republic of Congo))
- Commonwealth Sport Canada
- Team CSC, a professional cycling team from Denmark
- CS Constantine, an Algerian football club

=== Other organizations ===
- Cancer Support Community, an international nonprofit
- Canadian Society of Cinematographers
- Center for Science and Culture, an American "intelligent design" conservative Christian think tank
- Centro Sperimentale di Cinematografia, an Italian film school and archives
- China Scholarship Council
- Civil service commission, similarly-named government agencies in various countries handling civil service
- Classic Stage Company, an Off-Broadway theatre
- Confédération Syndicale Congolaise, the native name for the Congolese Trade Union Confederation
- Confédération des Syndicats Chrétiens, the native name for the Confederation of Christian Trade Unions, a Belgian trade union
- Congregatio a Sancta Cruce, the native name for the Congregation of Holy Cross, a Roman Catholic organization
- Correctional Service of Canada, a Canadian government agency
- Cyberspace Solarium Commission, a United States bipartisan, congressionally mandated intergovernmental body

== Other uses ==
- Canadian Securities Course
- Canadian Surface Combatant, a military shipbuilding project of the Royal Canadian Navy
- Close Supervision Centre - the most restrictive UK prison regime
- Corps of Staff Cadets, military unit, Australia
- Criminal sexual conduct
- ICAO airline designator for the Chinese Sichuan Airlines
- The SANS Critical Security Controls for Effective Cyber Defense
