= Anna Duncan =

Anna Duncan may refer to:

- Anna Duncan, a fictional character from the BBC children's series Grange Hill.
- Anna Duncan (née Denzler), one of the Isadorables
- Ana Duncan, Australian military officer
