= Astroworld Festival crowd crush =

2021 crowd disaster in Houston, Texas, US

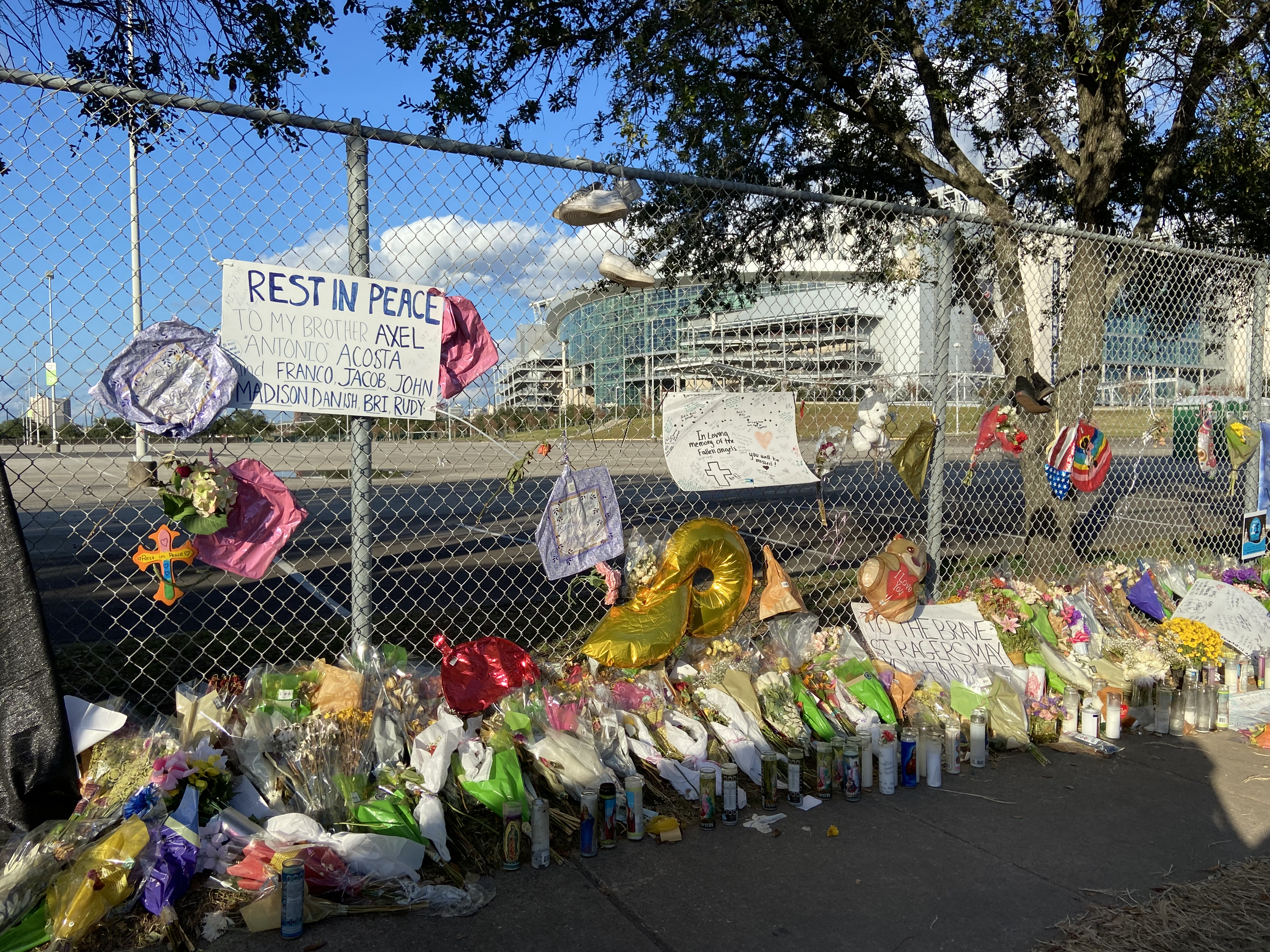
- Memorial outside of NRG Park
- Date: November 5, 2021; 5 years ago
- Time: c. 9:06 – 10:10 p.m. CDT (UTC−5)
- Location: NRG Park, Houston, Texas, U.S.; 29°41′16″N 95°25′05″W
- Type: Crowd crush
- Deaths: 10
- Injuries: 25 hospitalized, 300+ with minor injuries
- Charges: None

On November 5, 2021, a fatal crowd crush occurred during the Astroworld Festival, a one time tour hosted by American rapper Travis Scott at NRG Park in Houston, Texas. Eight people were pronounced dead on the day of the incident, and two more died in the hospital in the following days. The Harris County medical examiner's office declared the cause of death to be compressive asphyxiation while the manner of death was ruled an accident.

Numerous lawsuits have been filed against Scott, Live Nation, and other parties involved, with allegations of negligence and failure to ensure the safety of attendees. On June 29, 2023, a Texas grand jury declined to indict Scott or anyone associated with the concert.

== Background ==
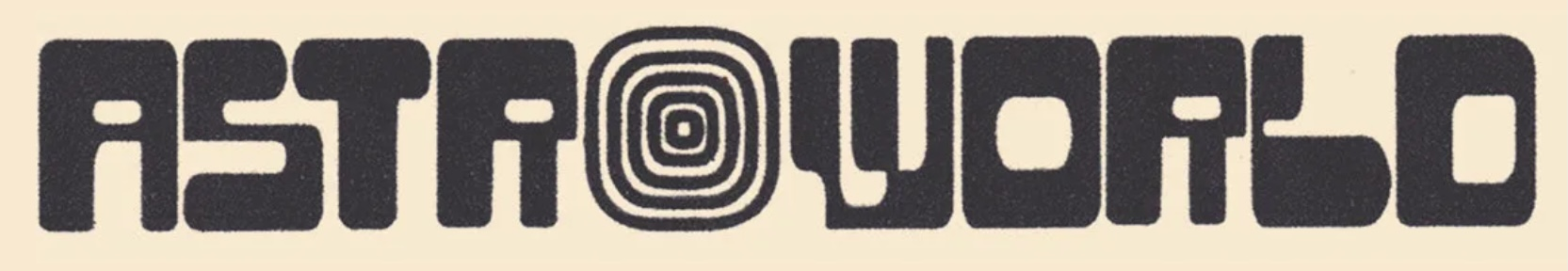
Official logo for the 2021 edition of the Astroworld Festival

American rapper Travis Scott founded the annual Astroworld Festival music event in 2018, taking its name from his third studio album that was released the same year. Astroworld 2021 was organized and managed by Live Nation and its affiliates. Apple Music would live-stream Scott's performance.

=== Logistics ===
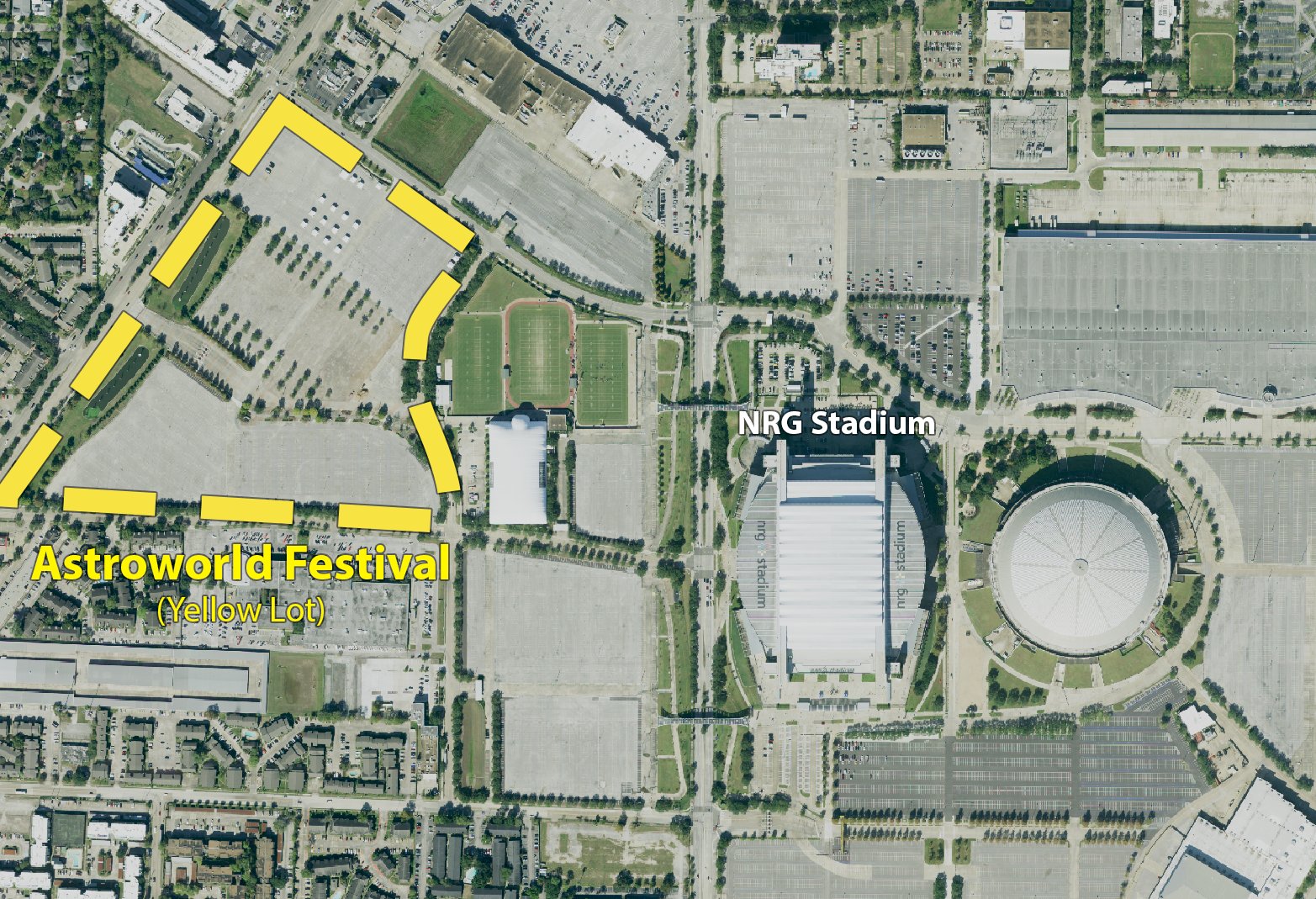
Aerial image of the Astroworld Festival area

The 2021 festival was to be held over two consecutive nights. Tickets sold out in under an hour after going on sale in May. Over 100,000 people were expected to attend. Authorities planned to limit first-night attendees to 70,000. Later, attendee numbers were further reduced to 50,000, although city fire codes permitted up to 200,000 people. The city of Houston and Harris County organized security for the event. Then Mayor of Houston Sylvester Turner stated more than 1,000 security staff and police were present; the exact number of police was estimated at 530, more than double the number at 2019's Astroworld event, with only about 240 police officers.

NRG Park, which is owned and managed by Harris County Sports & Convention Corporation (HCSCC), had significantly expanded its operation compared with those of prior festivals. Houston Police Department (HPD) Chief Troy Finner said on November 10 his department had no part in the writing or agreements of the original contract. NRG Park staff had asked HPD to close two major thoroughfares outside the festival's site beginning November 3 to prevent stampedes; as of November 10, there was no confirmation the request was granted.

=== Warning signs ===
Weeks before the festival, NRG's Park's General Manager Mark Miller noted repeated concerns about the "ratio of guests to staff". Live Nation subsidiary ScoreMore Shows offered to remedy this by providing more staff. Exclusivity agreements for NRG Park prevented the county from using services other than those offered by Contemporary Services Corporation (CSC). As a result, on November 4, Harris County officials signed an amendment to the contract with ScoreMore providing more staff. Showrunners Live Nation and ScoreMore contracted Seyth Boardman, co-founder of live-entertainment risk-management company B3 Risk Solutions, for Astroworld as its safety-and-risk director; Boardman was also a longtime manager at CSC, resulting in conflicts of interest on budgetary issues, staffing, and security protocol.

The initial version of the event-operations plan prepared by ScoreMore contained eventualities such as deaths, traumatic injuries, severe weather, an active shooter, civil unrest, lost persons, missing children, and unruly fans. It did not contain plans for crowd surges or mosh pit safety. Additionally, prior incidents such as a gate breach at the prior Astroworld Festival and security issues at Scott's concerts were not specifically addressed. Despite reports of subsequent revisions, HCSCC said it had not obtained the revisions prior to the event. Early attendees recalled witnessing a confusing layout with inadequate signage, poor lighting, lack of adequate water stations, lack of exits, 100-foot-wide (30 m) quadrants conducive to severe and unmanageable crowd surges, and access aisles too narrow for security and medical staff; these accounts were later corroborated by experts.

According to a lawsuit against Apple Music, the streamer's camera team and equipment split the premises horizontally and vertically. The lawsuit alleged the decision compromised concertgoers' means of egress and evacuation in favor of better vantage points for the cameras.

Houston Police Department said it had 528 on-duty officers at the festival, including 367 for the night shift and 161 held over from the day. According to early reporting, Live Nation provided another 755 security officers. These totals were later called into question, with no secondary verification of these numbers. HPD Chief Troy Finner disputed Live Nation's totals; he described record-keeping from the subsidiaries under their purview as "not good". Paramedic cover was provided by ParaDocs Worldwide, a contractor from Brooklyn, New York, that established a main medical tent and smaller aid stations around the venue.

According to early reporting, Houston Fire Department (HFD) stationed 20 ambulances outside the venue ahead of the concert. Houston Professional Fire Fighters Association (HPFFA) President Marty Lancton later disputed that total, saying none of his personnel were inside the venue because it was owned by the county and that the HPFFA had only four staff members on standby outside.

== Timeline ==
=== Build-up ===
At 5:00 a.m., fans began to line up at the festival's outer perimeter. At 7:00 a.m., HFD and HPD set up their command post in the Orange Lot, more than 1 mile (1.6 km) east of the festival main stage. In the planning documents, a second incident command post in the Purple Lot was outlined. HFD chief Sam Peña stated he was not aware of the second command post and no firefighters were posted there.

At 8:15 a.m., HFD received a call from a police lieutenant requesting riot gear due to the crowd's behavior at the security perimeter. At 9:00 a.m, some attendees waiting in line were throwing trash at each other, crowd surfing and surging toward the grounds' outer barriers. From approximately 9:15 a.m. to 9:45 a.m., numerous checkpoints, including the festival's main-entrance gate and a COVID-19-testing site were breached and bypassed prior to the grounds' first opening at 10 a.m., with no immediate evidence of recovery or the number of people who entered. A security guard was injured and medics attended to four more people.

Around 9:30 a.m., associates of HFD Assistant Chief and event-emergency designee Michelle McLeod and the Chief of the closest fire district, Section 21 said the latter were denied venue access for a preparatory dry run of NRG Park by an employee at Contemporary Services Corporation, and again by their head of security, who gave the District Chief only a map to compensate. McLeod's request for radios was also denied, later supplanted with a cellphone number, which ScoreMore's plans indicated would be slow and unreliable due to extra network traffic.

At approximately 10:00 a.m., a crowd attempted to pull down barricades and rush a checkpoint, and ignited small fireworks. A girl was trampled and her foot became stuck between the metal bars of a barricade; a police officer responded by discharging his TASER into the sky. Several injured concertgoers were taken to the hospital that morning, a process that continued throughout the afternoon. Starting at 11:00 a.m., according to HFD logs, crowds at both lines for merchandise vendors became volatile, causing one to shut down by 12:00 p.m. to avoid endangering both those waiting and those working their tables.

At 12:17 p.m., staff lost control of another checkpoint and the fence in the Green Lot was damaged by an individual using bolt cutters. By 2:00 p.m. a VIP entrance completely broke down after at least 200 fans surged through its barricades and checkpoints, knocking over metal detectors and trampling several attendees. At least one person was injured and by 2:30 p.m., at least six were detained for trespassing. According to multiple eyewitness accounts, authority figures at the entrances or on the grounds abandoned wristbanding, pat-downs, and directional posts, and later that night alcohol and drugs were seen in the possession of numerous attendees, especially in the merchandise section.

By about 3:15 p.m., HPD started to report dangerous crowd conditions. At 3:54 p.m., according to ParaDocs' logs, medics had treated at least 54 patients and crowd conditions were getting dangerous. At approximately 4:15 p.m., around 150 people broke and breached another gate. At 4:30 p.m., several eyewitnesses described injuries from several attendees attempting to climb over barricades to escape crowd compression and mosh pits at the festival's secondary stage where Don Toliver was performing.

Between approximately 4 p.m. and 5 p.m., a meeting took place in Travis Scott's trailer that included Chief Finner, Scott, and Scott's personal security manager Michael Brown. Finner said he relayed concerns about the unruly crowd, advised Scott's team to be cautious about their messaging on social media, and urged awareness of social unrest and the COVID-19 pandemic. Finner also advised Brown to contact his department in advance. He then thanked Scott for his support of Houston. According to Scott's lawyer, neither security nor best practices were discussed, characterizing the conversation as a brief one to only wish Scott well.

At 6:55 p.m., HFD logged more than 100 people rushing the VIP gate, which was already heavily damaged from its breach four hours earlier. Fifteen guards were moved from the main gate to the corridor between the front barricade and the main stage in order to escort anyone not allowed there from that zone; supervisors did not provide headsets to receive instruction nor radios for communication. By 7:00 p.m., an attendee said she was being pressed against barricades at the main stage. By 8:39 p.m., security lifted at least five fans over pen barricades near the Chills stage. Around this time, a video from a member of the crowd showed a person calling for help and security assisting another as they were examined.

Scott was set to perform on the first night of the Astroworld Festival, with a countdown timer appearing thirty minutes before his set. Attendees cited by the Houston Chronicle, CNN, and ABC News said that as crowds from the last three of eight guest artists' concerts for Yves Tumor, Don Toliver and SZA at the grounds' only other stage, 'Thrills', finished prior to Scott's countdown, they boxed-in the crowd already waiting front-and-center at the 'Chills' stage solely being used that day for Scott's performance. With barriers, then the sound and lighting stands, followed by concessions just behind that initial crowd directly in front, they were left with nowhere to escape, and compression worsened until breathing became difficult.

An EMT dealing with an expected influx of people seeking medical help for overdoses said their understaffed medical teams became overwhelmed with traumatic injuries by 8:15 p.m. and they had to stop documenting patients and start triage. After running out of medical equipment and naloxone, treatment was delayed by at least 20 minutes for many unconscious patients. Some medics on-hire who were not trained in CPR had to seek out audience members who were, but gave up because the crowds were too tightly packed for the procedure to be properly implemented.

According to HPD logs, by approximately 8:52 p.m. nearly 300 people had been treated, which ParaDocs CEO Pollak later said was not unusual in his practice for a crowd that size; he mentioned only two transports to hospitals by that point, which he described as a minimal total in comparison to his past work. An EMT told The Washington Post he had heard on his radio from other staff that people were being trampled as early as 9:00 p.m., having overheard discussions to shut down the concert early. He did not know why the show continued, deciding with several colleagues it was too dangerous to enter the crush and attempt to help the injured. Event organizers had estimated HPD had logged 5,000 non-ticket holders entering the venue after the various breaches, with an approximate 55,000 total in attendance at 9:02 p.m. that night. NRG Park Manager Miller later told HCSCC Chairman of the Board Edgar Colón in a meeting on November 17 Live Nation's scanner report indicated only 37,858 attendees with scanned tickets on the property.

=== Onstage events ===
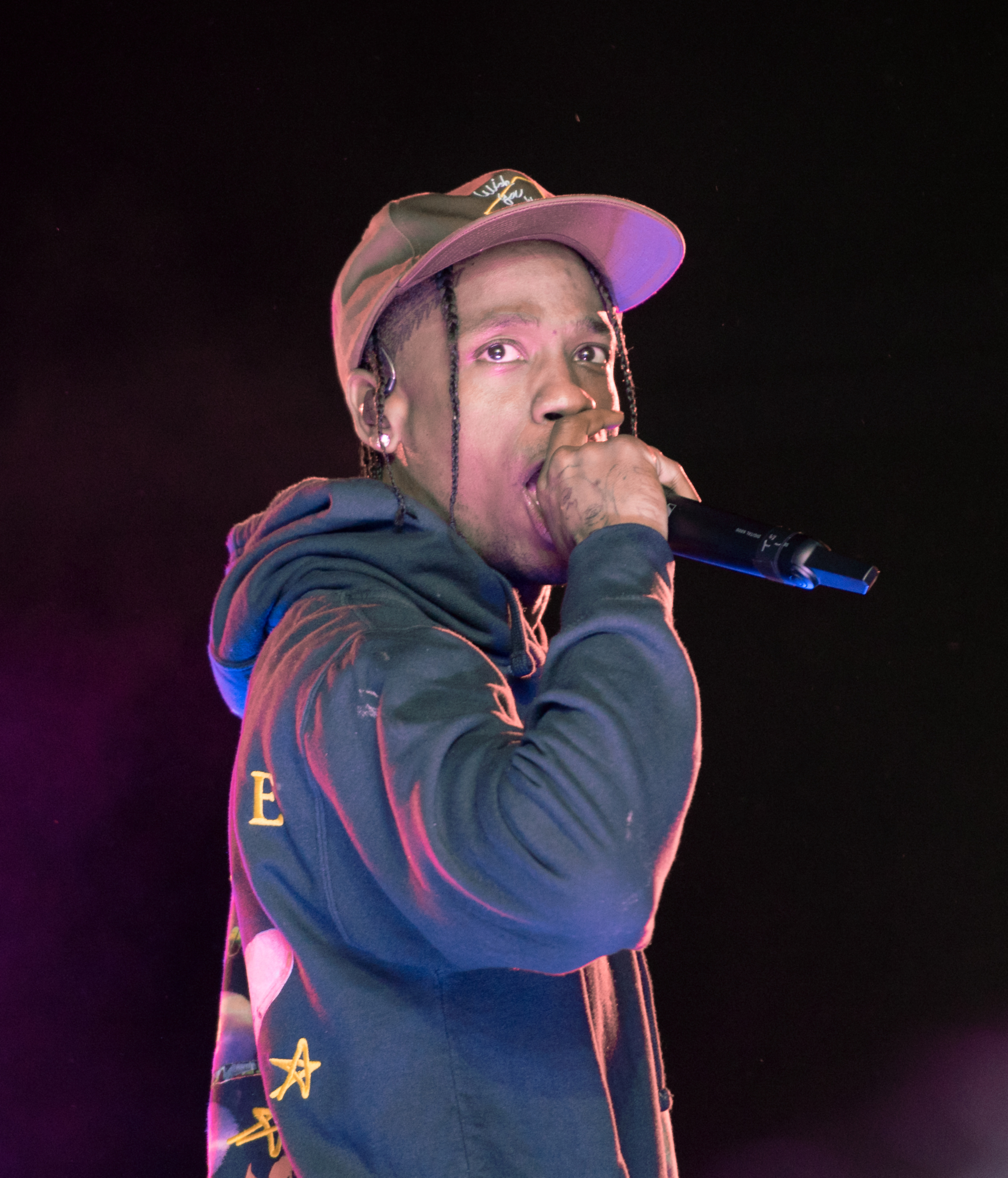
The crowd crush occurred during a performance by Travis Scott, founder of the Astroworld Festival (pictured here at a 2019 concert).

Scott was scheduled to start his set at 8:45 p.m. but did not appear on stage until 9:02 p.m., starting his set at 9:06 p.m. His appearance resulted in a push toward it, leading to a human crush. According to HFD Chief Sam Peña, at about 9:00 p.m., members of the crowd pressed forward and surged from the sides, causing a crush near the stage; he added the crush was caused by issues close to the stage, where the crowd was tightly packed, rather than by obstructed exits. As people struggled to remain standing, several began to fall and many were injured. Panic grew as Scott started the second song of his set and the remaining escape routes shrank, and several attendees attempted to climb over barricades.

At 9:11 p.m., the concert's Unified Command—which consisted of Houston police, festival security, festival production staff, ParaDocs dispatchers, and Harris County Emergency Core dispatchers—reported the main stage had been compromised. They instructed their helicopter to investigate because video showed fans were unable to escape from the area closest to the stage. Because the breach was limited to a single section, an official advised standing by and waiting for concert management. At 9:12 p.m., a tightly packed group of fans in the crowd's southern quadrant began screaming for medical help.

According to forensic analysis of videos from crowd experts for The Washington Post, at least one victim who died was seen falling under a mass of people at the concert's opening. Three others who died were seen unconscious in a pile of fans by at least 9:16 p.m., one of whom had attempted to save two younger women's lives. They were part of a group of at least seven who died from their injuries in the center of the crowd's south quadrant. The crowd was so densely concentrated, that only 1.85 square feet (0.172 m^{2}) of space per person was available, leading to compressive asphyxiation.

At 9:13 p.m., an officer reported multiple fans scaling a gate. At 9:16 p.m., multiple reports of breathing problems and people being trampled were sporadically heard on radio traffic but with no clear location. At 9:18 p.m., HPD logs and radio traffic indicated at least one crush injury had occurred and at 9:21 p.m., crowd compression; and at 9:23 p.m., some fans began climbing a speaker tower to escape the crush. According to a security guard, during Scott's performance, more than 12 attendees screamed at him for help to pull them over the barricades.

Scott stopped the show for the first time at about 9:24 p.m., saying "Somebody passed out right here" toward the front of the stage. Other fans elsewhere continued screaming and waving to attract his attention but Scott began his next song. At approximately 9:27 p.m., Scott paused and hunched over after a song. While the crowd chanted his name, Scott stood up and walked to the right, pointed offstage, asked for more lights, and asked the crowd to "make some noise for my boy right there hanging in the tree". At this time, some nearby concertgoers were still calling out for medics. Scott then told everyone to make a gesture with their middle fingers "because they are ready to rage" and continued his set.

At approximately 9:30 p.m., medical staff moved to someone lying unresponsive in front of a reserved section, then multiple barriers were reported compromised and officials asked a drone for clearer footage. Scott noticed an ambulance in the crowd, pointed and asked "What the fuck is that?" After telling the crowd, "If everybody good, put a middle finger up to the sky", two members of Scott's entourage came onto the stage to have an indecipherable conversation for several seconds, after which Scott turned to the crowd, asking twice and was joined by one of the two others on stage again for "two hands in the sky". Many people complied and Scott said: "Y'all know what you came to do, Chase B, let's go". Scott continued the concert, telling the crowd he wanted to hear the ground shake, then sending the two people who were on stage to dive off and crowd-surf.

As Scott was starting to sing at approximately 9:34 p.m., a boy named Ayden Cruz yelled at a camera operator multiple times from the bottom of his media tower to stop the show, which was ignored. A woman named Seanna Faith McCarty soon joined him, climbing its ladder onto his platform to shout concerns of someone dead in the crowd. After also being ignored, the other concertgoer went onto the platform to join her but another audience member told them both the crowd would take care of it. "People are fucking dying! I want to save somebody's life! That's somebody's kid!", he responded. The operator told both to leave the platform and continued to film. Multiple mayday requests from other operators went unheeded and the media towers to which they were trying to escape were being climbed by other desperate attendees.

At approximately 9:35 p.m., a graduate assistant attending the concert who also worked as a firefighter and EMT confirmed their inability to find a pulse on a 22-year-old woman whose skin had turned grayish-blue as a result of cyanosis, and he attempted to revive her by pumping her chest while getting another attendee to breathe air into her lungs. Relieved two ParaDocs medics had attended the scene by approximately 9:42 p.m., he quickly realized they had no oxygen bag or defibrillator, being told they had run out; the graduate assistant watched with horror as one's compression were not properly implemented while the other's backboard had no straps. After propping the board up on a fence, the woman's unconscious body slid off and hit the ground head first. The victim, Bharti Shahani, died several days later at a hospital.

At approximately 9:42 p.m., Scott stopped performing mid-song for his third and final time after noticing an unconscious attendee. Security team members provided first aid and he resumed the performance. A video showed an unconscious man being carried from the area.

The attorney of one of the victims who later died confirmed the victim had been photographed in the medical tent at approximately 9:43 p.m. with a disfigured face as a result of being stepped on by the crowd. During Scott's next song, a group of concertgoers in the crowd's western quadrant began chanting "Stop the show!", which those in the southern quadrant had tried 40 minutes prior but their requests went unheeded. At 9:55 p.m., an audience member was seen dancing on the roof of a retrofitted golf cart medical staff were using as an ambulance. Just prior to 10:00 p.m., eyewitnesses noted the initial crush seemed to be over but the crowd became chaotic again with the arrival of Drake, who performed a song with Scott. Scott and Drake started the song at approximately 10:08 p.m. before closing the show with the final song, after which Scott waved to the crowd while jogging offstage, saying: "I love y'all. Make it home safe. Good night!"

=== Crush ===
External videos
- Most of the dead Astroworld Festival victims were in one highly packed area | Visual Forensics | The Washington Post
- UH Student who Attended Astroworld Festival Describes Account | KRPC Houston
- Astroworld Festival: Tracking the Tragedy | ABC News

Several veteran ParaDocs supervisors, including one who was trapped in the southern quadrant attempting to assist three concertgoers in critical condition while being protected by some attendees, told Business Insider the majority of the patients they were attempting to resuscitate had no signs of physical trauma, such as stepped-on faces or chests, but had fixed and dilated pupils—signs of anoxia—as a result of suffocation while on their feet. Even for trapped concertgoers who remained upright, a local internal medicine physician told Houston Chronicle those who could not expand their diaphragms, leading to blood flow to be restricted to the brain and heart, likely died within minutes as a result of cardiac arrest.

One eyewitness told ABC News she saw security guards reinforce crowd-control barricades by tying the supporting bars together as they began to buckle under the pressure. Disregarding protocol prohibitive to personal harm, an EMT contracted with ParaDocs described on TikTok they had to reject desperate concertgoers grabbing him to assist others he knew were likely dead; music was too loud for radio traffic to be heard and a crowd that did not care about those around them. One fan who was 40 feet (12 m) from the stage told Dallas ABC affiliate WFAA-TV when he complained to a staff member, he was told, "It's a mosh pit, what do you expect?" Another told Rolling Stone he witnessed unconscious concertgoers being crowd-surfed to safety.

Several attendees told KTRK-TV, the local owned-and-operated ABC station in Houston, that the piles of people in some areas became two bodies deep, and that some tried to help, only to be sucked further into the crowd. Another victim described to the Associated Press how the desperation in the crowd eventually increased to "every man for himself". An HPD officer was then warned by an unidentified official on the radio that they were having structural issues that could be catastrophic. One concertgoer claimed on Twitter that security responded to his pleas for help by saying that they could not do anything to stop the show as the concert was streaming live.

An ICU nurse attending the concert who passed out twice from the pressure on her chest and back described her shock to CNN at the "feral" atmosphere, describing how people continued to trample those on the ground to get to the front despite their screams. Two guests in the rear disabled-accessible section told the Houston Chronicle they saw 50 to 60 people climbing two stories up onto the concert's projection screens with exposed wiring to escape the crush or for better views that were not stopped by authorities. A couple searching for missing shoes and a phone amid the chaos told The Washington Post they eventually found six phones, learning later that two belonged to those who had died. Some medical personnel, including former combat medics, recalled to USA Today that their colleagues wept while working on 11 young concertgoers in cardiac arrest at once in both an over-capacity medical tent and an unforgiving crowd.

=== Immediate response ===
At the concert's opening, ParaDocs' chief dispatcher Jon Saltzman told Business Insider Unified Command, where he was stationed, received reports of at least three attendees suffering smoke inhalation from the stage's fireworks; then, his radio check-ins to supervisors stationed at forward triage positions were responded to with what he deciphered to be at least three reports of cardiac arrest, the highest number he and his colleagues had seen at any event they had worked. Saltzman told the festival dispatcher at command to shut down the festival then waited for a response he implied he never received.

At 9:18 p.m., HFD received its first report of an injury related to breathing issues and a perceived crush. At 9:21 p.m., staff among the event's private medical contractors were dispatched to the front of the crowd; they confirmed multiple injuries to Unified Command but the concert continued. Concertgoers recorded staff performing cardiopulmonary resuscitation (CPR) on unconscious attendees by 9:28 p.m. Because medical personnel were overwhelmed in triage, audience members also attempted to perform CPR. Several people were administered naloxone.

At approximately 9:30 p.m., a panicked female officer asked for a clear radio channel to report unconscious trampled victims in the medical tent, warning of worsening crowd conditions that may affect officers attempting rescues.

At 9:33 p.m., police reported unconscious trample victims at the front of the stage, and in the next 10 minutes, police operators made five 911 calls about unconscious people in the crowd and reports of possible CPR ongoing or needed. A deputy chief confirmed a compressing crowd and several attendees staggering out and experiencing panic attacks, and with no time to consult with ParaDocs, Chief Koochak ordered an 'EMT Task Force' of 16 units to attend the scene.

At 9:38 p.m., a ParaDocs dispatcher at Unified Command relayed a mass-casualty incident to officials; HFD dispatchers declared the mass-casualty event, but communication began to break down and the declaration was not reaching officials such as police effectively. The HPD Assistant Chief with several officials told festival promoters the show should not continue but according to Houston Chronicle, Chief Finner, following consultation with local officials, decided to defer this decision to festival management, production and Travis Scott, citing his department's lack of power. Several officials told The New York Times some workers did not follow proper protocol in identifying suspected deceased persons by code over the radio.

At about 9:40 p.m., the first HFD ambulances reached the gate behind the main stage and were diverted to another area in response to a cardiac arrest. Security misdirected at least one of the district chiefs of those units to a gate 0.5 mi (0.80 km) from the medical tent, which wasted minutes when patrons were likely dying. A HPD official advised several inquiring HFD officials on the radio the show would soon end but it continued. From 9:40 p.m. to 9:50 p.m., some HFD firefighters saw five patients at the medical tent whose hearts had stopped.

At 9:53 p.m., HFD officials upgraded the incident to 'Level 2', sending 12 more units, and a mass-casualty declaration was entered into department logs. Scott's lawyer McPherson said he believed festival management, via his in-ear monitors, informed Scott just before 10:00 p.m. the show would need to conclude; according to Scott, this was only a message the show must end after its guests appeared onstage, and he was not given a reason the performance was being cut short. At 10:03 p.m., several officials overheard radio traffic from a female officer saying the show had been stopped but Scott and Drake were still performing. Footage from the event showed police officers near the stage pointing their phones at the stage while the performance continued, at least 15 minutes after the mass-casualty event was declared.

At 10:13 p.m., doctors at Ben Taub Hospital declared the festival's first fatality. Scott's set finished between 10:10 p.m. and 10:15 p.m. (Note: Turner said the show ended at 10:10 p.m. though attendees cited by CNN and the Houston Chronicle provided times between 10:13 p.m. and 10:15 p.m. Scott's set was scheduled to start at 8:45 p.m. and end at 10:30 p.m.) Some reports said he finished his originally planned 25-song set but others said it ended thirty minutes earlier than scheduled. From 10:46 p.m. to 11:18 p.m., seven others were pronounced dead by four other Houston hospitals. By 11:00 p.m., HFD officials had dispatched 55 of its own units to the scene and called off any more of its paramedics from heading to the incident. At 12:20 a.m., approximately three hours after a mass-casualty event was declared, the first official public statement about an "NRG Park incident" was posted on the HPD's Twitter account.

== Victims ==
Eight victims, aged 14 to 27, died on the night of the concert. The names of the victims are John Hilgert, Brianna Rodriguez, Jacob Jurinek, Franco Patiño, Danish Baig, Axel Acosta, Rudy Peña, and Madison Dubiski. Twenty-two-year-old Texas A&M University student Bharti Shahani was declared brain dead on November 9 and died the next day. Nine-year-old boy Ezra Blount, who was placed in a medically induced coma after being crushed and trampled at the concert, died on November 14. It was the highest number of accidental deaths at a U.S. concert since the Station nightclub fire, which killed 100 people in West Warwick, Rhode Island, in 2003.

Twenty-five people were evacuated to local hospitals following the concert.

== Aftermath ==
Immediately following the concert, Travis Scott attended a scheduled, private after-party at a local Dave & Buster's restaurant. Scott and fellow performer Drake allegedly did not hear pleas to stop the concert while it was in progress; they first learned about the severity of the incident at the restaurant and immediately left.

By 2:13 a.m., a reunification area for missing persons had been set up at the Wyndham Houston Hotel. At NRG Park, authorities announced to the press the initial death toll of eight victims. In its first statement of condolences at about 6:00 a.m., Astroworld announced in a social media post the second night of the festival on November 6 had been canceled. The incident quickly gained widespread media attention and some media dubbed the event "Gen Z's Altamont".

Two days after the crush, a makeshift memorial was created on a chain-link fence outside the festival area, where people left tributes that included prayer candles, flowers, pictures of the deceased, and stuffed animals. A non-profit group from San Antonio provided therapy dogs at the scene. On November 21, the family of one of the dead victims had images of the other nine posted at the memorial as a gesture of support for the other families.

Sunday Service Choir, an American gospel collective led by rapper and producer Kanye West, partnered with Triller and Revolt TV to hold a free, live, online worship service in memory of and in tribute to those who died.

On November 14, Houston rapper Bun B and a local restaurant hosted an event called "Breaking Bread" at a local brewery, and several food trucks used supplies that were originally intended for the remainder of the festival. A portion of sales were donated to the victims and their families.

== Reactions ==
=== Festival performers and companies ===
In a statement posted on his social media the next day, Scott offered his condolences to those who died, and offered support to local authorities. Later that day, he posted a video response on Instagram Stories that some media criticized for its perceived insincerity and parodied it on social media. Also that day, Scott's then-girlfriend Kylie Jenner who attended the show and her sister Kendall deleted their social-media posts related to the festival following criticism. Both released subsequent statements expressing their sympathy; Kylie said she and Scott were unaware of the fatalities until after the concert, they would not have continued filming or performing if they had been aware. The following day, Apple Music, which live-streamed the event, deleted its social-media posts related to the festival and issued a statement commemorating the victims. On November 8, Drake released his first statement, voicing similar sentiments to Scott's.

Live Nation in a statement said: "Our entire team is mourning alongside the community" and that it was working on ways to support attendees, the families of victims, and staff with mental-health counseling and help with hospital costs for the victims and their loved ones, and promising refunds to all paying concertgoers. On the Monday following the incident, the company's share price fell by 5.4%, wiping more than $1 billion from its stock value, which company observers characterized as "modest".

In an interview with Charlamagne tha God posted to YouTube on December 9, Scott said the media was forcing responsibility onto him as the face of the festival and that he was looking for solutions for future concerts. He also said he did not know about the deaths until minutes before the authorities' press conference the morning after the incident, and that he had not heard fans screaming for him to stop the concert, citing his ear-piece, and expressed regret about his initial Instagram video apology before more information was made public, and that he understood plaintiffs' refusal of his offer to cover funeral costs. Law firms acting for several victims who died criticized the interview to several outlets as gaslighting, punting blame, and a packaged public-relations stunt from an artist who built his brand on an abusive relationship with his fans, saying it further increased his liability with tacit acknowledgments of improper planning and willful ignorance by Scott's production team.

==== Donations and reimbursements ====
That weekend, American musicians Roddy Ricch and Toro y Moi both announced they would donate their net payments for performing at the event to the victims' families.

On November 8, Scott announced he would cover the costs of funerals and medical expenses for those who died at the festival. According to Houston Chronicle on November 26, attorneys for many of the victims told them not to accept Scott's or Live Nation's offers, and on November 29, Rolling Stone obtained a letter from lawyers representing the 9-year-old victim who died declining a request from Scott's new lawyer Daniel M. Petrocelli for either a meeting or reimbursement. The next day, representatives for four other victims who died said they had also rejected or ignored similar offers from Scott's old and new legal teams, describing the gestures as demeaning attempts to lessen public pressure rather than a genuine display of remorse.

In a statement on November 8, Scott made an additional offer of a month of free online therapy to concert attendees as part of an unpaid partnership with BetterHelp. This offer was criticized as insufficient, inauthentic and exploitative given its limit, and an opportunity for future sponsorship for Scott; and cited BetterHelp's past privacy controversies and its notice of the unsuitability of its services for minors, despite most of the concert attendees being teenagers. Other mental-health experts were hesitant to dismiss the move. On November 9, on his Instagram account, Scott posted an incorrect telephone number for the therapy; he had intended to post the hotline of the National Alliance on Mental Illness (NAMI) but this was supposed to be a dedicated national number NAMI created in partnership with BetterHealth. Early attempts at calling the number reached a government agency scam while later callers said they reached a car insurance scam. Scott corrected the number on his account two days after BuzzFeed News contacted his team for comment.

By November 18, reports arose online of rumors from several concertgoers saying any right to participate in a class-action lawsuit or arbitration against Live Nation would have to be waived if they wished to receive a ticket refund, with their only option being a company settlement outside of court. Lawyers who reviewed the company's policies later said there were no explicit qualifications in the terms of use and a sweeping waiver was unlikely to be upheld in court. Amid the controversy, guidance for obtaining full refunds for many concertgoers who had not planned to make legal filings still had not been given, and many could not contact Front Gate Tickets, the event's official promoter and ticketing provider.

On December 17, Rolling Stone obtained an email from a staffer hired for the concert; it contained an updated contract sent on November 15 from a manager working for Live Nation, ScoreMore, and XX Nation, that contained a clause saying workers would not be reimbursed unless they agreed to a liability release, which he refused to sign.

=== Travis Scott sponsors and partnerships ===
According to Variety on November 8, Scott had canceled his headlining appearance at the Day N Vegas Festival on November 13 in Las Vegas, Nevada. The Houston Rockets' scheduled Travis Scott Day celebration for its November 10 home game against Detroit Pistons was postponed out of sensitivity for the victims; it instead observed a moment of silence. A streetwear boutique owned by Scott and DJ Chase B at Rice Village, Houston, indefinitely closed following the crush incident.

Epic Games temporarily removed its Travis Scott emote from its video game Fortnite on November 7 and Nike announced the indefinite postponement of its early-2022 Air Max 1 x Cactus Jack footwear collaboration launch with Scott in an email to users of its SNKRS app on November 15 out of respect for the victims. CEO of fashion house Dior Pietro Beccari told Women's Wear Daily (WWD) in a statement it was internally evaluating the situation, as of November 16, deciding whether to remove its spring/summer menswear range "Cactus Jack Dior", on which it had collaborated with Scott, which according to Rolling Stone indicated the range had already been manufactured for distribution in January 2022. The postponement was confirmed on December 28. Parsons School of Design told WWD it had decided not to renew a contract with Scott's Cactus Jack Design Center that had hosted online courses, and provided scholarships in fashion and design for underserved students in Houston in partnership with the local chapter of non-profit My Brother's Keeper and TX/RX labs, which did not say whether it would stay open as a result of the withdrawal. As of November 17, General Mills told Houston Chronicle it had no plans for future collaborations with Scott following its custom Reese's Puffs cereal box in 2019. Houston Chronicle could not confirm the future of Scott's branding relationships with McDonald's, Sony's PlayStation, Byredo, and Mattel.

W Media agreed with Scott's and Kylie Jenner's decision soon after the concert to withdraw online and in-print appearance on a magazine cover and a feature with their daughter Stormi. A representative for the Kardashian family refuted allegations Scott had been cut from storylines for their upcoming Hulu series The Kardashians, stating he had not yet been filmed. A controversy with the streaming service arose on December 1 following the couple's decision to post and then remove the same day a news special from KTRK-TV titled "Astroworld: Concert from Hell". Confusion and criticism followed their perceived profiting from the partnership too soon after the incident, and the impression Hulu had produced their documentary, which had been publicly available on the affiliate's website since November 24, after being aired on television on November 20. The affiliate's original news special was retitled "Astroworld Aftermath" on December 2.

On December 10, trade publications Beer Business Daily and Beer Marketer's Insights reported Anheuser-Busch had informed its wholesalers of the decision to discontinue all production and development of CACTI Agave Spiked Seltzer, its brand partnership with Scott, less than nine months after it first went on sale, speculating whether the cause was incident or a prior significant sales dip. According to Ad Age, the same day, the brand had its related Twitter account removed, having not posted since the incident. A representative for Scott told the outlet his endorsement deal had expired on November 30, saying the decision to cease its involvement was mutual, although a source supposedly connected to the brand told TMZ the product had not been discontinued but put on a temporary hold.

That day, Palm Springs, California, ABC affiliate KESQ reported on a Change.org petition calling for Scott's removal from the 2022 Coachella Valley Music and Arts Festival, for which he was a headliner. The petition had received at least 60,000 signatures, then confirmed, citing reports from its host city Indio, California, and its Community Services Manager Jim Curtis, Scott was no longer on the bill. The next day, Variety reported the festival had informed Scott's agent Cara Lewis it intended to pull Scott from the bill and was willing to pay a 25% kill fee for the cancellation but that Lewis was trying to keep him on it, offering to forgo his performance fee as an incentive. On December 17, TMZ reported Scott was partnering with the United States Conference of Mayors (USCM) to create a safety report for live entertainment with a focus on new innovation and technology. Following reports confirming Scott's removal from Coachella's roster in early January 2022 and rumors one of its headliners, Kanye West would be featuring him regardless, another Change.org petition supporting Scott's return to the festival garnered over 70,000 signatures in three days by January 26, approximately 65,000 of which were removed the following day due to fraudulent activity, followed by its unexplained complete removal the day after.

=== Political and cultural responses ===
On the night of the incident, Senator Ted Cruz described the events as horrific and said there needed to be a very serious, credible, and objective investigation. The next day, Texas governor Greg Abbott said: "What happened at Astroworld Festival last night was tragic, and our hearts are with those who lost their lives and those who were injured in the terrifying crowd surge". On November 10, Abbott announced the formation of the Texas Task Force on Concert Safety Panel to begin creating safety standards and guidelines for future events of this type in the state. Rapper Megan Thee Stallion announced she had cancelled her local show scheduled for December 3 out of respect for the victims.

The legal counsel for several festivals, lawyers for earlier concert victims, and experts on concert-disaster task forces told several media outlets substantial reforms toward standing-room-only general admission tickets were not likely because assigned seating was unaffordable for small indoor venues and did not make sense for outdoor festivals, and that Astroworld's failures were not a sweeping referendum on festival culture. Organizers, taking more responsibility for more frequently stopping shows and not equating that with a cancellation was seen as more plausible. The biggest obstacle to that reform was specialty hiring during a global labor shortage as a result of COVID-19, and the biggest opportunities included emerging technology such as crowd-tension monitoring through heat maps of crowds overlaid on CCTV.

On November 19, rapper Chuck D of the hip-hop group Public Enemy wrote an open letter to concert promoters defending Travis Scott; according to D, Scott, a young black man, was being blamed for a crime while the "old white men running the corps" that Scott and his fans trusted with their lives "stay quiet in the shadows". D also said Scott is a performer who did not run logistics and questioned the perception in the public and press of Scott's past and present irresponsibility, saying if Live Nation was truly concerned, it would not have promoted and partnered with him, and let him headline his own show. On November 22, policy for the San Bernardino, California, edition of hip-hop festival Rolling Loud was amended to exclude patrons younger than 18, referring in a statement to the Astroworld Festival incident. Press and concertgoers asked why the policy was not permanently implemented for all future Rolling Loud concerts.

The Governor's Task Force on Concert Safety that was formed after the incident issued its final report on April 19, 2022; it recommended a solution to permit loopholes as a result of discrepancies between Harris County and the City of Houston; a standardized event-permitting process for the state of Texas that had earlier led to "forum shopping" across event promoters; a universal permitting template with a standardized checklist for counties to consult before issuing them; unique contingency plans for events fans could easily breach, stampede, or overcrowd; clearly outlined triggers for pausing or canceling shows; integration of local first responders in the unified on-site command and control; and greater prioritization of resources, application and training in risk management for staff and promoters in future events. The report said there was not likely occupancy overloading issues that night but problems in crowd management. Mayor Turner and Precinct 2 Commissioner Adrian Garcia announced their own Special Events Task Force on February 9, 2022, for both Houston and Harris County, with 10 other industry leaders to review and make recommendations for improved communication and protocols, and permitting requirements for future events. The Special Events Task Force was not analyzing the events at Astroworld Festival because this would interfere with ongoing investigations.

In August 2023, Travis Scott announced his Circus Maximus Tour, which included a planned show at Houston's Toyota Center that was later withdrawn after the Houston Police Officer's Union stated letting Travis Scott perform in Houston again was irresponsible.

== Investigation ==
Immediately after the incident, local homicide and narcotics investigators, representatives for the insurance companies of the defendants, OSHA, and lawyers for the concertgoers attended the venue. On November 8, a judge issued a limited freeze order to pause cleanup of the site, allowing victims' lawyers to investigate and take photographs, and requiring organizers to preserve remaining evidence after an agreement was reached with defendants, clarifying it did not entirely waive their legal defenses. Live Nation and ScoreMore said they were working with local authorities, investigators were inspecting the grounds, and CCTV video had been handed over. Also on November 8, Director of the FBI Christopher A. Wray told ABC News his agency would be providing technical assistance to local investigators, and FBI Houston branch spokesperson Brittany Davis said they were ready to assist, but city officials initially declined to publicly divulge whether the department had asked for the FBI's aid or had accepted it. On November 10, Chief Finner called the FBI a partner in the investigation but said his department was taking the lead.

Police initially stated a security officer had become unconscious after feeling a prick to his neck and that he had a puncture wound consistent with an injection. The Wall Street Journal reported part of the investigation into the deaths was to determine if concertgoers had taken drugs laced with fentanyl and potentially contributed to some of the deaths. On November 8, HPD said drugging theory was unconfirmed, and toxicology experts and concert attendees cast doubt on its validity. On November 9, Chief Finner said evidence of drugs on the festival grounds existed but the drugs' identities were not clear. On November 10, Finner said the security guard who made the allegations had been located and that his story was not consistent with the reporting of injected drugs; according to Finner, the guard was actually struck in the head and fell unconscious.

On December 16, the Harris County Institute of Forensic Science's medical examiner concluded the cause of death for all 10 deceased victims was accidental compressive asphyxiation, and one victim had a contributing cause from the combined toxic effects of cocaine, ethanol and methamphetamine.

On December 22, the United States House of Representatives' Committee on Oversight and Reform announced the launch of a bipartisan investigation into Live Nation's role in the incident, requesting documents including the company's withholding of pay for employees until they signed revised contracts that released them from liability, the delay in stopping the concert in the 40 minutes after a mass-casualty incident was declared, and improper training for the medical staff on-duty, from its CEO Michael Rapino by January 7, 2022. The committee also requested Rapino to attend its January 12, 2022, briefing on the matter. On January 7, Variety reported Live Nation had begun providing relevant information in response to the committee's requests, that the company had been granted an extension to provide the documents, and that the briefing would likely take place in early February. On January 14, HPD announced on Twitter the establishment of a public-facing FBI website where attendees could upload images and video from the main venue area that night between 8 and 11 p.m. to aid the investigation. A law enforcement expert working with one of the plaintiffs complained to Rolling Stone of the time it took for the department to launch the website while another lawyer countered concerns about the loss of valuable data, saying plaintiffs likely already had it stored.

=== Jurisdiction discussions ===
Lawyers for the victims and local officials, including Harris County judge Lina Hidalgo, proposed an independent investigation to avoid conflicts of interest, and Finner said on November 10 he would be open to it if the HPD's investigation revealed there was a need. Subsequent reporting said the county's ability to take action had been complicated by Finner's announcement of his own investigation, and by Scott's ties to local officials and investment in the city. Several media outlets asked Scott whether it factored into Scott being granted less scrutiny and more leeway regarding usual concert rules that night. Amid a conflict over jurisdiction between the city and the county on instituting additional permitting at NRG Park post-incident, Houston's mayor Sylvester Turner said he would not wait for the county commissioners to institute changes before taking action on his own.

The following week, crowd management expert and head of L.A.-based firm Crowd Management Strategies Paul Wertheimer, who served on a task force following The Who concert disaster (1979), told The Washington Post only an independent commission would provide a satisfactory analysis; he also told Texas Monthly until festival organizers were found criminally liable for their role in fatal disasters, which he said rarely happens, no progress would be made toward preventing a future disaster. On November 15, Judge Lina Hidalgo said she did not wish to interfere with the HPD investigation but Harris County Commissioners Board voted against her proposal and voted to have a county auditor pick a firm to make an assessment, and give recommendations and best practices. Hidalgo and her colleagues unanimously voted for an internal review of safety practices at scheduled outdoor events at NRG Park, HCSCC and the Harris County Houston Sports Authority by Harris County Administrator David Berry with Turner's office and relevant departments. The commissioners' reasoning was initially unclear because executive sessions were not public. Before the session, Commissioner Adrian Garcia, a former HPD officer, voiced his concern about the county being exposed to liability from new revelations. Hidalgo later expressed her concerns on whether Berry would come back with actionable lessons that were not forgettable and vague. Local political observers noted Garcia's foresight about likely damage to his career had he granted an independent investigation.

=== Culpability discussions ===
==== Responsibility for stopping the show ====
In response to inquiries about the 40-minute delay after a mass casualty declaration, Finner later cited his deference to festival authorities on the decision and concerns about possible rioting, saying: "you cannot just close when you have over 50,000 individuals". Finner also deferred to Live Nation on culpability. Media and live-entertainment experts disputed both explanations, citing clauses in Houston's charter for what qualified as an emergency and actions that could have been taken such as a longer show pause, partial evacuation, or emergency messaging on the speakers or video boards, none of which were used.

Peña told The New York Times on November 7 he felt Scott and the organizers were responsible for stopping the show, saying the performer can call for and get a tactical pause when something goes wrong, and that it would have been helpful if Scott had asked for a pause. Following a press conference on November 10, Finner said on Twitter HPD had told organizers to shut down the performance while at least one person was receiving CPR but did not say when the show stopped after police had asked.

Scott's spokesperson Stephanie Rawlings-Blake called Peña's claim ludicrous, citing the festival operations' chain of command for Scott's lack of authority to stop the show and a communications breakdown in an interview on CBS News, a statement Variety called implausible in an opinion piece. Scott's lawyer Ed McPherson called Finner's and Peña's claims blame-shifting and inconsistent, citing Finner's implied retraction of an initial claim concerns about rioting explained the delay in their response, prior precedent of HPD shutting off power and sound at the 2019 iteration of the festival when it ran five minutes over, and video of Houston police taking photographs and video approximately 15 to 25 minutes after a mass-casualty event was declared. He also supported the initial reporting of Scott's lack of knowledge of the events that transpired until the following day and defended Scott's calls to rage as simply a form of audience engagement, pointing to Scott's attempts to help fans, and distractions from the lights and his earpiece.

USA Today's editorial board called the use of Finner's initial claim of concern about rioting to explain the delay in stopping the show inexplicable, noting the event was not a "sovereign entity, where emissaries negotiate a conclusion", and called for city or county officials who relinquished their authority to be properly investigated. Videos of other concerts being paused by artists such as Kurt Cobain, Adele, Kendrick Lamar, Rihanna, Dave Grohl, ASAP Rocky, Chris Martin, Mike Shinoda, and Lil Pump to address safety concerns and medical emergencies soon went viral in response to the Astroworld Festival crowd crush. Less than a week later, artist SZA, who finished her set at Astroworld at about 8:30 p.m. prior to Scott's countdown, stopped her concert in Salt Lake City due to someone fainting in the audience, insisting her team bring them water, and arguing during the break for a culture shift for future shows.

==== Contractor and patron issues ====
In Facebook posts made during and immediately after the event, Houston security director for CSC Jason Huckabay blamed festival attendees, whom he called "idiots ... from 15–22 in age", while attributing deaths to a generation that "has no value in other peoples lives" and "waves of dumbasses breaking down fences trying to rush in" while his guards tried to halt them.

Describing the events as an impossible feat about which he would have nightmares the rest of his life, ParaDocs CEO Pollak defended his more-than-70 event staff to reporters on November 15, saying his firm did not have the ability to stop the concert, which he felt should have been done earlier, but understood early concerns about possible rioting. He later told Houston Chronicle he had told his staff in a post-event meeting they had helped resuscitate three patients, and that they had enough medical equipment for the show, comparing it to a festival for 270,000 that had worked smoothly a weekend later.

HFD Deputy Chief Isaac Garcia, who had lobbied for years with his union to mandate a greater presence of firefighters at large events, told USA Today a lack of radio communication and planning left them to assume ParaDocs was being overrun, at which point their recovery efforts would come too late and would likely have been pointless.

=== Grand jury ruling ===
On June 29, 2023, the grand jury of the 228th District Court of Harris County declined to indict Scott, or anyone else on criminal charges.

== Lawsuits ==
Attorneys representing the deceased, injured, and traumatized fans stated in court documents that organizers were motivated by profit at concertgoers' expense and should have foreseen the potential for a disastrous outcome. The attorneys of the injured and traumatized security guards stated in court documents that their hiring companies lied about their compensation and failed to provide a safe workplace or basic training.

Over 50 defendants were involved, including Travis Scott and Drake (as Drake joined Scott in his headline set), Scott's company Jack Enterprises (as well as personal foundation and label Cactus Jack), the concert's streamer Apple Music, concert promoters (including Live Nation Entertainment, The Bowery Presents LLC and ScoreMore Holdings LLC), venues and security firms (including ASM Global, XX Global Inc., AJ Melino & Associates, Contemporary Services Corporation, ParaDocs Worldwide, Strike Force Protective Services, NRG Energy, NRG Park, Valle Security Services, Tri Star Sports & Entertainment Group and the Harris County Sports & Convention Corporation), other record labels behind production (Epic Records and Grand Hustle Records), and various other producers, promoters, subcontractors, and public relations officials. Neither Houston nor Harris County were sued, which plaintiff-side lawyer Tony Buzbee explained to Texas Monthly was common practice for lawyers in the state given the historical difficulty of successful cases against those entities as a result of the Texas Tort Claims Act. The most prominent counsel retained by high-profile defendants included Susman Godfrey representing Live Nation, Norton Rose Fulbright representing ASM Global, and Daniel Petrocelli representing Travis Scott.

According to the ACORD certificate of liability insurance for NRG Park that was filed with the city of Houston and subsequently obtained by TMZ, NRG Park had $1 million in primary coverage, with umbrella coverage of $25 million. The news outlet reported that as of November 9 there was not any evidence of other coverage, and it speculated regarding which parties would be held responsible and possibly have to file for bankruptcy if insurance coverage turns out to be inadequate to pay out all the claims. While some involved lawyers that spoke to the Houston Chronicle on November 26 were eager to learn how much the named defendants had in insurance coverage, others agreed with prior concerns raised regarding the likelihood of bankruptcy filings resulting from the large damage amounts sought from defendants ultimately leading to less compensation for victims. Plaintiff-side lawyer Chad Pinkerton, who had previously fought in court against Live Nation in the 2017 Las Vegas shooting, said that based on the defendant's choice of legal counsel, they were preparing for high-stakes, "bet-the-company" litigation, estimating they likely had about $200 million in general insurance coverage with another $100 million in premises liability insurance, the security firms had about $20 million in insurance, and it was unclear how much insurance coverage Scott had, if any.

In the weeks following the incident, Houston NBC affiliate KPRC-TV reported a sharp increase in digital and television ads for personal injury lawyers seeking Astroworld victims who still had not filed, and, inferring that not all of these were created with the victims' best interests in mind, warned prospective clients of fraud, providing tips on protecting private information.

=== Active litigation ===
==== Pre-trial pre-gag order ====
As of December 3, 2021, more than 275 civil wrongful death, personal injury, and premises liability lawsuits had been filed from more than 12 law firms, including attorneys Benjamin Crump and Tony Buzbee, representing more than 1,250 people seeking billions in damages. Buzbee told Rolling Stone neither the authorities nor organizers were incentivized to stop the show because of the money at stake, stating if the performance had been interfered with, their reactions would have been different. On December 6, attorney Brent Coon and crowd-surge expert G. Keith Still announced a lawsuit on behalf of another 1,547 concertgoers seeking a further $10 billion in damages, calling for legislation to mandate both certification of events from crowd-control specialists, training for workers, and stricter criminal liability for errors in live entertainment.

TMZ obtained legal documents that showed Travis Scott's first general denial to a civil suit from one concertgoer; Scott asked for dismissal of the lawsuits because they pertained to himself, his foundation, and his company. Shortly after, a representative for Scott confirmed a similar request for dismissal of 11 lawsuits and potentially all future ones. Live Nation, ScoreMore, and HCSCC all denied the allegations against them in legal filings. Coon described Scott's denial and request for dismissal as standard for this kind of case while attorney James Lassiter, representing the family of the 22-year-old victim who died, called Scott's motion shameful.

After filings from Brent Coon & Associates raising concerns on discussions to consolidate the cases were withdrawn on January 26, 2022, the Texas Judicial Panel On Multidistrict Litigation (MDL) granted a joint motion from victims and organizers to consolidate the then-387 lawsuits representing nearly 2,800 alleged victims, which had previously been placed before more than 12 Harris County judges, and any subsequent cases, into a single case before one judge. Both parties requested Judge Lauren Reeder of the 234th District Court of Harris County to oversee the MDL, and the order did not disclose which state judge would be handling the case.

==== Pre-trial post-gag order ====
On February 15, 2022, 11th District Court Judge Kristen Hawkins, who the judicial board had assigned to handle all civil pretrial matters to avoid scheduling issues, conflicting rulings or duplicated findings and evidence, issued a gag order for all involved parties that restricted public comment on the character of anyone involved in the trial that would be inadmissible in a court of law. No party had requested the motion but Hawkings cited the "volume of pre-trial and in-trial publicity" and the "right to a fair trial by an impartial jury". The motion did not affect the then-ongoing criminal investigation, under which no charges had yet been filed, but several local legal observers predicted a chilling effect. On the first pretrial hearing on March 1, 2022, plaintiffs were placed into four main categories: those who were killed, those who suffered traumatic brain injury, those with bodily injury, and those with post-traumatic stress disorder (PTSD).

On March 9, 2022, representatives of the 9-year-old victim filed an emergency motion with the court to either cover Travis Scott under the gag order or rescind it entirely to ensure fairness among the parties. The day before, Scott had announced a new initiative called Project HEAL with a $5 million commitment to his Cactus Jack foundation towards his HBCU scholarship fund, an expansion of Houston's CACT.US Youth Design Center, mental health coverage for low-income and minority youth, and the funding of the U.S. Conference of Mayors Task Force of Event Safety. A relative of the victim told Rolling Stone Scott's announcement was a public-relations effort to sway potential jurors, and Scott's spokesperson called the plaintiff's filing a shameful, cynical publicity stunt. On March 10, in a filing, Scott's lawyers argued for Scott's First Amendment right to publicly speak about his philanthropic work.

The next day, the victim's lawyer replied in a filing their concerns were with Scott's marketing campaign of reputation repair rather than the donations. No motions were ruled upon at a March 28 emergency motion hearing. Lawyers for Live Nation said in an April 8 filing the documentary Concert Crush: The Travis Scott Festival Tragedy could taint the jury pool if released as planned in several Texas cities. A lawyer for another plaintiff criticized the letter, calling it an attempted diversion with no stated request for relief from the court.

On May 9, 2022, a legal filing detailed 732 claims tied to injuries that required extensive medical treatment, 1,649 tied to less-extensive treatment, and 2,540 claims for injuries where the severity was still under review. A suit that was filed in December 2021 but not reported until May 2022 claimed the plaintiff had lost her unborn child as a result of being trampled at the concert.

=== Settled litigation ===
On October 20, 2022, Tony Buzbee's law firm announced settlements with several defendants in two lawsuits brought by the families of two attendees who died at the concert. The terms and damages were not disclosed.

== See also ==
- List of human stampedes and crushes
- City College stampede
- Love parade disaster
- Trainwreck: The Astroworld Tragedy
