= Ana Duncan =

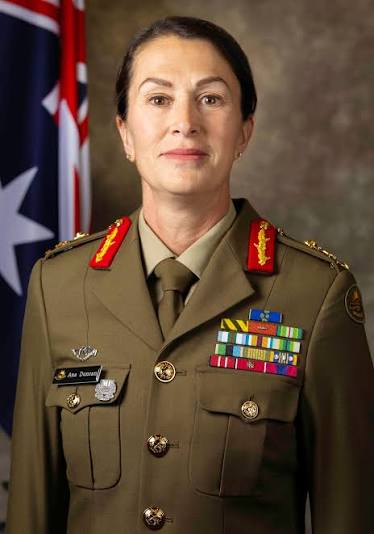
- Major General Ana Duncan
- Spouse: Gavin Duncan
- Children: 2
- Military career
- Allegiance: Australia
- Branch: Australian Army
- Service years: 1990-present
- Rank: Major General
- Commands: Commander Forces Command Commander, Australian Cyber Command; Commandant, Royal Military College – Australia 1st Signal Regiment
- Conflicts: Military intervention against ISIL
- Awards: Member of the Order of Australia (AM); Conspicuous Service Cross (CSC)

Major General Ana Duncan, AM CSC, is a senior officer in the Australian Army who has served as Commander of Forces Command (Australia) since January 2025. She previously served as the inaugural Commander of Australian Cyber Command and as Commandant of the Royal Military College - Australia. She is one of the most senior female officers in the Australian Defence Force.

== Military career ==
Duncan was commissioned into the Australian Army as a Signals officer. During her career she served in units of the 1st, 3rd and 17th Brigades, the 1st Division, and on a number of regional and Middle East operational deployments.

She later commanded the 1st Signal Regiment, including Force Communication Unit X in the Middle East. Her operational experience included communications, command-and-control, and strategic planning roles supporting Australian and coalition military operations.

== Senior leadership appointments ==
Duncan held senior appointments within the Department of the Prime Minister and Cabinet, the Office of the Chief of Army, Strategic Policy Division, Deployable Join Force Headquarters, and Career Management - Army.

As a brigadier, she served as the Director Future Plans and Strategy (CJ5) for the International coalition against the Islamic State in Iraq and Syria (ISIS). In this role she was also Australia's Senior National Representative of deployed Australian personnel in Iraq.

In 2019 she became Director-General Army Leadership and later served as Commandant of the Royal Military College - Australia, overseeing leadership and officer training within the Australian Army.

Duncan subsequently became the inaugural Commander of the Australian Cyber Command, responsible for the Australian Defence Force's cyber warfare and cyber operations capability.Duncan subsequently became the inaugural Commander of Australian Cyber Command.

== Commander Forces Command ==
In January 2025, Duncan was appointed Commander Forces Command, one of the Australian Army's most senior appointments.

Forces Command is responsible for the majority of the Australian Army's personnel, training establishments, combat support units, and enabling formations, accounting for approximately 85% of Army Personnel.

As Commander Forces Command, Duncan oversees Army preparedness, training, force generation, and professional development across Australia.

== Education ==
Duncan is a graduate of:

- Royal Military College, Duntroon
- Australian Command and Staff College
- Centre for Defence and Strategic Studies
- Commander Joint Task Force Course
- United States Army Land Component Commander Course
- Australian Institute of Company Directors

She holds a Bachelor of Arts, a Master of Arts in Strategy and Management, and a Master of Science in Telecommunications.

== Personal life ==
Duncan is married to Gavin Duncan and has two children. She also serves as a trustee of Defence Community Dogs, a charity supporting veterans and serving personnel.

== Awards and Honours ==
- Member of the Order of Australia (AM)
- Conspicuous Service Cross (CSC)

== See also ==
- Australian Army
- Forces Command (Australia)
- Australian Defence Force
- Royal Military College, Duntroon
