= Construction Skills Certification Scheme =

British company

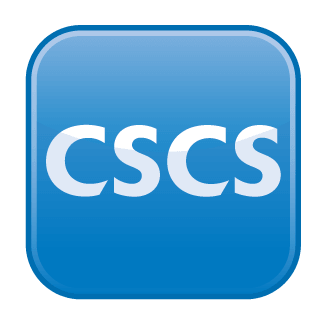
Construction Skills Certification Scheme logo

The Construction Skills Certification Scheme (CSCS) is a British company that runs a qualification verification scheme of the same name for the British construction industry. CSCS is the leading skills certification scheme within the UK construction industry and CSCS cards provide proof that individuals working on construction sites have the appropriate training and qualifications for the job they do on site. By ensuring the workforce are appropriately qualified the card plays its part in improving standards and safety on UK construction sites. Holding a CSCS card is not a legislative requirement. It is entirely up to the principal contractor or client whether workers are required to hold a card before they are allowed on site. However, most principal contractors and major house builders require construction workers on their sites to hold a valid card.

== History ==
The Construction Skills Certification Scheme was founded as a limited company on 21 February 1995. It issues photographic smart cards to construction workers as proof of training and qualification. The original aim of the scheme was to ensure that all construction workers in the UK receive training and achieve qualifications suitable to their role and have a means of proving this. From 1997 the scheme has been administered by the Construction Industry Training Board (CITB). However in December 2017 the CITB notified CSCS that it no longer wanted the contract and CSCS would need an alternative supplier at the end of the 42 month notification period.

In the mid 2000s a spate of deaths in the construction industry led to the threat of government action on major contractors. As a result many of them decided to move to a so-called "100% carded" policy whereby every worker or visitor to site was required to hold a CSCS card as proof of a level of health and safety competence. This was initially welcomed by CSCS as it led to a rapid growth in the number of cards issued. The majority of the new cards were for the "construction site operative" and the "construction related occupation" categories – requiring no qualifications but passing a simple touchscreen health and safety test. New cards were also introduced for workers not covered by existing categories, going so far as to include a specific card for vending machine installers. By 2012 half of all cards issued were in the operative category and 25% were for construction related operations. As these were non-qualified roles the scheme had drifted away from one of its key original objectives – providing recognition for construction qualifications – and was seen merely as a "hoop that had to be jumped through to get workers onto site". In addition to the workers cards many contractors required visitors to have a CSCS card also, this led to the introduction of a visitors category – for which 120,000 cards were issued, far more than had ever been intended.

The CSCS scheme is supported by the Construction Leadership Council who specified in 2015 that the industry should not accept any skills cards that were not affiliated with the scheme – its so called "One Industry Logo" initiative. Affiliated schemes include the Construction Plant Competence Scheme and the Construction Industry Scaffolders Record Scheme. The CSCS schemes handle 400,000 applications and one million enquiries each year. As of December 2017 there were more than 1.6 million card holders. The CSCS company board has representatives from client and contractor trade bodies as well as employee trade unions.

In 2012, Graham Wren joined CSCS as chief executive and decided to move the scheme back towards a focus on qualifications. One of the first steps was taken in 2014 with the discontinuation of the operatives card and its replacement by a labourers card which required a level 1 qualification (all existing cards will expire by 2019). The "related occupations" card, of which 350,000 were in circulation, was discontinued in March 2017 with all cards set to expire by 2022. The visitors card, the last remaining non-qualified category, will be withdrawn on 28 February 2020 with all cards issued before then set to expire by August 2020.

In the view of CSCS many of the unqualified card holders should never have needed cards anyway as they do not work in construction-related occupations. CSCS is seeking to move towards a minimum of a level 2 National Vocational Qualification to qualify for a skilled occupations card and is working with the Construction Industry Training Board to ensure a relevant qualification exists for each category of card. The company hopes that restricting the issuance of cards will lead to a move away from 100% card access construction sites and lead to contractors focussing on providing suitable inductions to non-qualified persons and providing them with adequate supervision.

Graham Wren retired as CSCS Chief Executive Officer in July 2022 after 10 years of service. He was replaced by the current CEO Sean Kearns.

In November 2022, the CSCS Alliance was launched. The CSCS Alliance is made up of the 35 different schemes that carry the CSCS logo on their cards, representing not just the traditional construction trades but the many specialist occupations across the built environment. Since 2020, the 35 card schemes have come together under the banner of the CSCS Alliance to deliver to a common standard under a CSCS licence.
