= Conspicuous Service Cross =

Conspicuous Service Cross can refer to:

- Conspicuous Service Cross (Australia)
- Conspicuous Service Cross (New York)
- Conspicuous Service Cross (United Kingdom)
