= Contemporary Services Corporation =

Private crowd management and security company

Contemporary Services Corporation (CSC)
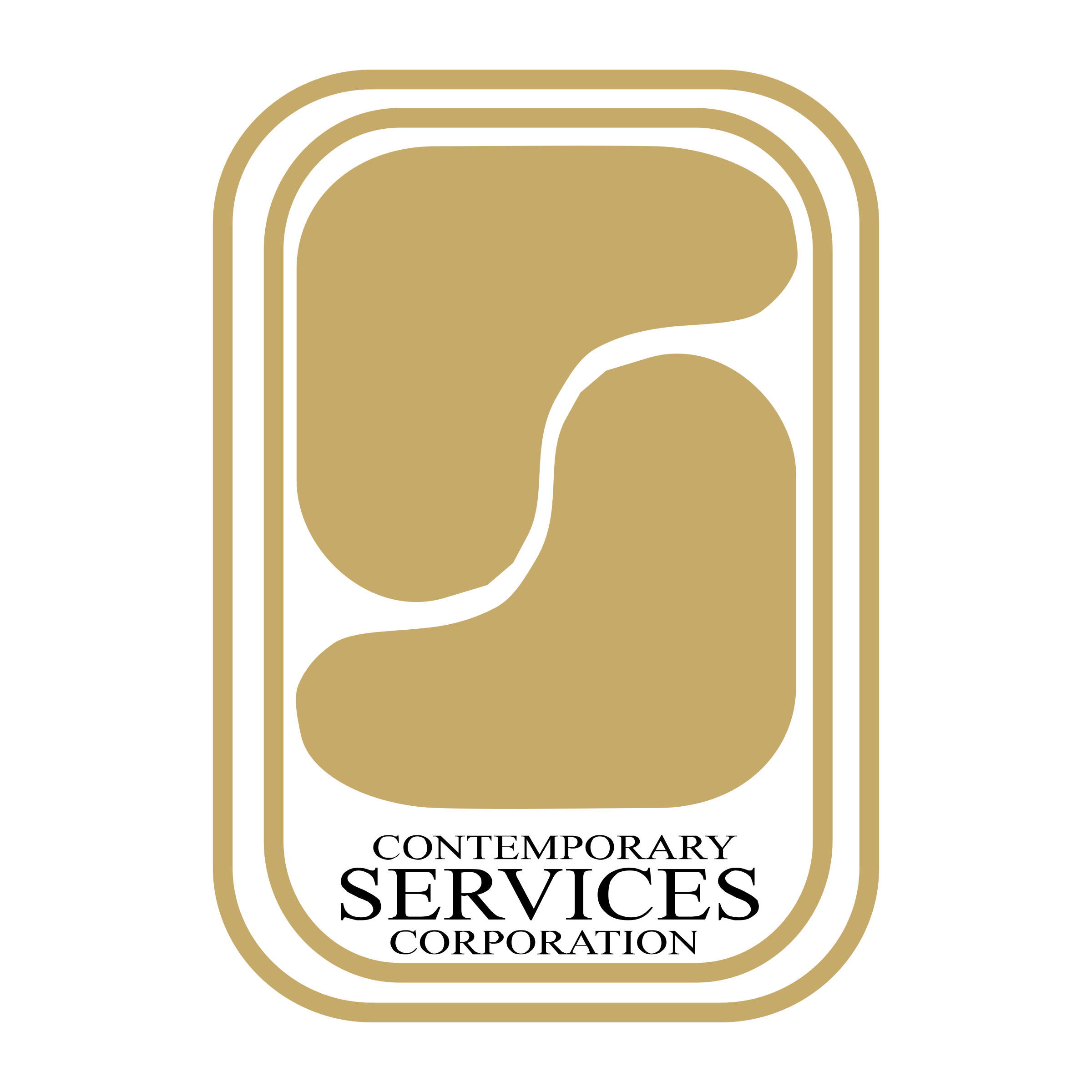
- Industry: Security and event services
- Founded: 1967
- Headquarters: Los Angeles, California
- Key people: Damon Zumwalt
- Services: Security services (security guard), crowd control
- Website: csc-usa.com

Contemporary Services Corporation (CSC) is a crowd management and security company.

== History ==
CSC was founded in Los Angeles in 1967.

As of 2024, the company provided services to more than 150 stadiums and arenas as well as 100 universities and colleges and 30 convention centers.

== Current operations ==
CSC is the largest event staff, and one of the largest security companies in North America. They are present in almost every major city in the US and Canada and are easily recognizable by their yellow and black shirts. CSC has also provided extra security for numerous presidential inaugurations since 1980. CSC provides services for major convention shows across the US and Canada and are well known at most convention centers.

They are the main line of security for several NFL teams, such as the Los Angeles Rams and Los Angeles Chargers at SoFi Stadium.

CSC also provides security for the Washington Nationals, Miami Marlins, Cleveland Indians, Tampa Bay Rays, and Los Angeles Angels of Anaheim MLB teams.

They provide services at the Coachella Music Festival in Indio, California and at the Firefly Festival in Dover, Delaware.
